= New Bandon Parish =

New Bandon
- Parish
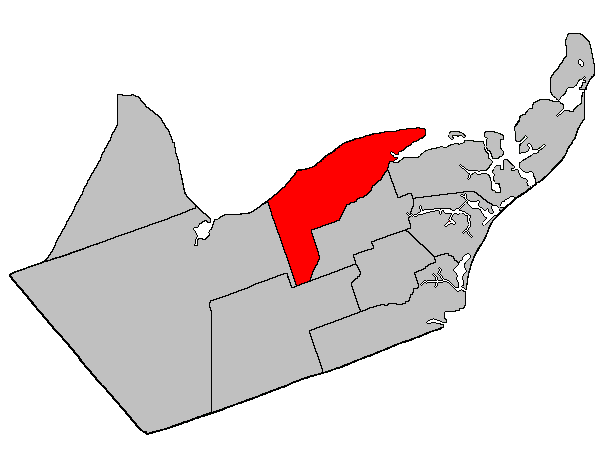
- Location within Gloucester County, New Brunswick
- Coordinates: 47.75°N 65.315°W
- Country: Canada
- Province: New Brunswick
- County: Gloucester
- Erected: 1831

Area
  - Land: 359.28 km^{2} (138.72 sq mi)

Population (2021)
  - Total: 1,200
  - Density: 3.3/km^{2} (8.5/sq mi)
  - Change 2016-2021: ▼1.2%
  - Dwellings: 714
- Time zone: UTC-4 (AST)
  - Summer (DST): UTC-3 (ADT)
- Figures do not include portions within the villages of Bertrand, Grande-Anse, Maisonnette, and Saint-Léolin

New Bandon is a geographic parish in Gloucester County, New Brunswick, Canada. (Note: The Territorial Division Act divides the province into 152 parishes, the cities of Saint John and Fredericton, and one town of Grand Falls. The Interpretation Act clarifies that parishes include any local government within their borders.)

For governance purposes, the heavily francophone east comprises the towns of Hautes-Terres and Rivière-du-Nord, while the heavily anglophone west is part of the Chaleur rural district. The towns are members of the Acadian Peninsula Regional Service Commission,

== Origin of name ==
The parish was named for Bandon, County Cork in Ireland, from which many of New Bandon's settlers originated.

== History ==
New Bandon was erected in 1831 from Saumarez Parish.

In 1941, the boundary with Paquetville Parish and Saint-Isidore Parish was adjusted.

In 1947, part of New Bandon was included in the newly erected Allardville Parish.

== Boundaries ==
New Bandon Parish (Note: The 1973 Territorial Division Act misspells the name New Brandon Parish; the name is spelt correctly in other modern government sources and in earlier versions of the Act.) is bounded:

- on the north by Chaleur Bay;
- on the east by Chaleur Bay and Caraquet Bay
- on the southeast and south by a line running up Caraquet River from its mouth to the mouth of Innishannon Brook, then southwesterly to a point west of the prolongation of Théophile Road on the north line of Range 3 in the Paquetville North Settlement, which runs along the north side of Route 340 and Notre-Dame-des-Érables Road, then southwesterly along Range 6 and its prolongation to the eastern line of Block 5 in Range 3 of timberland, then southeasterly to the southern line of Block 5 in Range 4, then southwesterly in a direct line to a point south of Dunn Pond on the northern line of Tier 1 in the Allardville East Settlement, which runs along the north side of Route 160, then westerly along Tier 1 to the Bathurst Parish line;
- on the west by the prolongation of the eastern line of a shoreline grant near Janeville, which crosses the junction of Route 11 and Route 340, from Tier 1 in Allardville East northerly to Chaleur Bay.

== Former governance ==
Prior to the 2023 governance reform, there were four villages and six LSDs at least partly in the parish. For convenience, this list runs from east to west, with the former LSD at the end. All LSDs in the Acadian Peninsula RSC provide basic LSD services plus street lighting and community & recreation services; New Bandon-Salmon Beach and the parish of New Bandon do not provide street lighting.

Maisonnette was on the tip of the peninsula between Caraquet Bay and Chaleur Bay. It was an LSD from 1967 until it became a village in 1986.

Poirier (LSD) ran along Route 303, fronting on Caraquet Bay. The single community is Village-des-Poirier. Established in 1987.

Anse-Bleue (LSD, French Anse Bleue) ran along Route 320, between Maisonnette and Grande-Anse, with an inland extension along Route 303. Established in 1968 to add street lighting.

Bertrand included the Village Historique Acadien Provincial Park and grants along the northern bank of the Caraquet River upriver to opposite the end of Émery Lane.

Dugas (LSD) ran along Dugas Road on the northern border of the Village Historique Acadien. Established in 1979 to add street lighting.

Grande-Anse ran primarily along the Chaleur Bay coast, with an inland area along Route 330 that includes the community of Saint-Paul.

Saint-Léolin was inland, bordering Grande-Anse and running along Route 330 and the western end of Chemin des Boudreau. The Saint-Joseph Settlement grants form the core of the village. It was an LSD from 1969 until it became a village in 1978.

The Paroisse Notre-Dame-des-Érables (LSD) extended into the parish along Route 340, taking in the northern part of the community of Rocheville. Established in 1986. An area west of grants along Route 340 is disputed with New Bandon-Salmon Beach, with maps issued by the two RSCs reflecting the dispute.

New Bandon-Salmon Beach (LSD) included coastal grants west from the community of New Bandon, extending into Bathurst Parish to the eastern border of Bathurst. Inland, the eastern boundary of the LSD followed grant lines along and near the Hornibrook Road until it reached the edge of Rocheville, then skirted around Rocheville before following the parish line. Clifton, Stonehaven, and Janeville are along the coast; Canobie, Canobie South and Springfield Settlement in the interior. Established in 1976.

The parish of New Bandon (LSD) comprised the remainder of the parish, surrounded by Grande-Anse, Saint-Léolin, and Bertrand on the east, New Bandon-Salmon Beach and The Paroisse Notre-Dame-des-Érables on the west. Route 135 connected the coast to the parish line at the Caraquet River opposite Burnsville. Pokeshaw and Black Rock were the two communities. Established in 1969 to provide fire protection; the associated taxing authority is called New Bandon Outside.

St. Paul (St-Paul) was an LSD along the northern edge of Saint-Léolin. It was established in 1977; a subdivision along Route 330 was annexed by Saint-Léolin in 1986; most of the LSD was annexed by Grande-Anse in 1989, with the remainder returned to the LSD of the parish of New Bandon.

== Communities ==
Communities at least partly within the parish. bold indicates an incorporated municipality; italics indicate a name no longer in official use

- Anse-Bleue
- **Bertrand**
- Black Rock
- Canobie
- Canobie South
- Clifton
- Dugas
- **Grande-Anse**
  - Village-Saint-Paul
- Janeville
- Johnson
- **Maisonnette**
- New Bandon
- Pokeshaw
- Rocheville
- **Saint-Léolin**
- Springfield Settlement
- Stonehaven
- Village-des-Poirier

== Bodies of water ==
Bodies of water (Note: Not including brooks, ponds or coves.) at least partly within the parish. italics indicate a name no longer in official use

- Big Tracadie River
- Caraquet River (Southwest Caraquet River)
- Rivière du Nord (Northwest Caraquet River)
- Little Pokeshaw River
- Pokeshaw River
- Caraquet Bay
- Chaleur Bay
- Nepisiguit Bay
- Goose Lake
- Teagues Lake

== Conservation areas ==
Parks, historic sites, and related entities at least partly within the parish.

- Acadian Village Wildlife Management Area
- Goose Lake Protected Natural Area
- Pokeshaw Protected Natural Area
- Tracadie River Wildlife Management Area
- Village Historique Acadien Provincial Park

== Demographics ==
Parish population total does not include incorporated municipalities

=== Population ===
**Population trend**

Census	Population	Change (%)
2016	1,214	▲1.6%
2011	1,195	▼16.0%
2006	1,422	▼3.8%
2001	1,478	▼8.8%
1996	1,621	▼7.1%
1991	1,744	N/A

=== Language ===
**Mother tongue (2016)**

Language	Population	Pct (%)
French only	685	56.4%
English only	515	42.4%
Both English and French	5	0.4%
Other languages	10	0.8%

== See also ==
- List of parishes in New Brunswick
