= Paquetville Parish =

Paquetville
- Parish
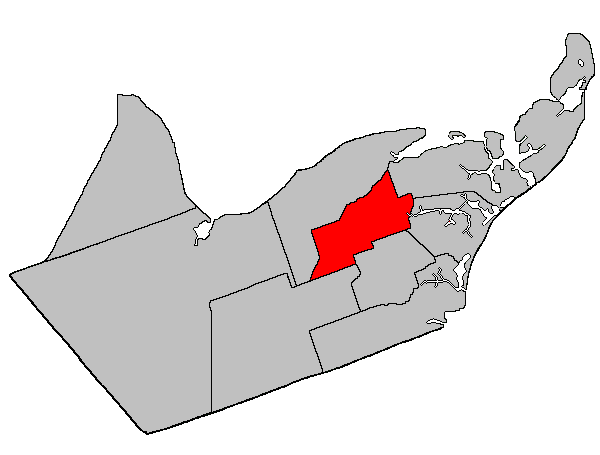
- Location within Gloucester County, New Brunswick
- Coordinates: 47.625°N 65.215°W
- Country: Canada
- Province: New Brunswick
- County: Gloucester
- Erected: 1897

Area
  - Land: 220.42 km^{2} (85.10 sq mi)

Population (2021)
  - Total: 2,250
  - Density: 10.2/km^{2} (26/sq mi)
  - Change 2016-2021: ▼3.4%
  - Dwellings: 1,145
- Time zone: UTC-4 (AST)
  - Summer (DST): UTC-3 (ADT)
- Figures do not include portions within the village of Paquetville and the regional municipality of Tracadie

Paquetville is a geographic parish in Gloucester County, New Brunswick, Canada. (Note: The Territorial Division Act divides the province into 152 parishes, the cities of Saint John and Fredericton, and one town of Grand Falls. The Interpretation Act clarifies that parishes include any local government within their borders.)

For governance purposes, is its divided between the towns of Hautes-Terres and Rivière-du-Nord, the regional municipality of Tracadie, and the Chaleur rural district. The municipalities are members of the Acadian Peninsula Regional Service Commission, while the rural district is a member of the Chaleur RSC.

== Origin of name ==
The parish may have been named in honour of Joseph-Marie Paquet, a priest influential in New Brunswick church politics and parish priest at Caraquet for two decades before his death in 1869.

== History ==
Paquetville was erected in 1897 from Caraquet Parish.

In 1903 the spelling was changed to Pacquetville then changed back in 1941.

== Boundaries ==
Paquetville Parish is bounded:

- on the west and north by a line beginning south of Dunn Pond on the rear line of grants in Tier 1 North of the Allardville East Settlement, which runs along Route 160, and running northeasterly until it reaches the line between two timber blocks southwest of the end of the Val-Doucet Road, then northerly to the westernmost corner of Range 3 of the Paquetville North Settlement, which runs along the north side of Notre-Dame-des-Érables Road and Route 340, then along the rear line of grants to a point west of the prolongation of Théophile Road, then northeast to the mouth of Innishannon Brook on the Caraquet River, then downstream to the eastern line of a grant on grant on the south side of the Caraquet River at a sharp bend, in Bertrand;
- on the east by a line running along the western line of a tier of grants along Rue Pinet and its prolongation from the Caraquet River to the northern line of grants along Principal Road, then easterly along the tier to the corner of a grant on the south side of Duval Road, then briefly southerly to the rear line of grants along the west side of Lavigne Road, then slightly more southerly along the tier to just short of Paquetville Road, then turning southwesterly and across Route 350 to the Pokemouche River, then across the river to the eastern line of Range Six of the Paquetville South Settlement, which straddles the Pokemouche, and southeasterly to the easternmost corner of the tier;
- on the south by the southern line of the Range Six grants to the northernmost corner of Range A, then southeasterly along the eastern line of Range A to its easternmost corner, then southwesterly to the southernmost corner of the tier, then southeasterly to the prolongation of the northern line of Tier 1 North in Allardville East Settlement, then southwesterly to the starting point.

== Former Governance ==
Prior to the 2023 governance reform, there were two villages – Bertrand and Paquetville – and three local service districts at least party within the parish, the LSDs of the Paroisse Notre-Dame-des-Érables, the parish of Paquetville, and the parish of Saint-Isidore.

The three local service districts provided basic LSD services along with street lighting and community & recreation services.

The Regional Municipality of Tracadie includes the southeastern corner of the parish along the Pokemouche River, an area about 2.1 kilometres long. Route 355 runs briefly along the parish line but otherwise there's no provincial highway access to the area.

The village of Bertrand occupied the northeastern corner of the parish, including the community of Haut-Bertrand; it is now part of Rivière-du-Nord.

The village of Paquetville contained a nearly square area along Route 135 where it's met by Rue des Fondateurs and Route 340; it is now part of Hautes-Terres.

The Paroisse Notre-Dame-des-Érables was an LSD in the northwestern corner of the parish, based on four tiers of grants along Route 340 and the Val-Doucet Road. The eastern boundary along the Route 340 tiers was about 1 kilometres west of Chemin du Portage, and along the Val-Doucet tiers about 700 metres east of the main part of Ruisseau de la Truite Road. The main community was Notre-Dame-des-Érables, with the LSD extending north along Route 340 into Bathurst Parish to include the community of Rocheville. It was established in 1986. Most is now part of Hautes-Terres, with a small part in the Chaleur rural district.

The local service district of the parish of Saint-Isidore included an area along the southern bank of Trout Brook and the Pokemouche River, running from the Tracadie boundary to a point about 2 kilometres west of Route 135. This area was part of the Bois-Blanc - Hacheyville - Duguayville service area. This LSD was extended into Paquetville Parish in 1994. Now part of Hautes-Terres.

The local service district of the parish of Paquetville included the remainder of the parish, two areas separated by the Paroisse Notre-Dame-des-Érables. The isolated southwestern corner of the parish had no provincial highway access; the main portion contained the communities of Burnsville, Haut-Paquetville, Petit-Paquetville, Saint-Amateur, Trudel, and Val-Doucet; Rang-Saint-Georges was on the southern edge of the village of Paquetville. It was established in 1969 to provide fire protection. Most is now part of Hautes-Terres, with two small areas belonging to the rural district.

Sainte-Rose was an LSD in the southeasern corner of the parish. Sainte-Rose was established in 1988 and in 2014 was annexed to help form the regional municipality of Grand Tracadie-Sheila.

== Communities ==
Communities at least partly within the parish. bold indicates an incorporated municipality

- **Bertrand**
  - Haut-Bertrand
- Burnsville
- Haut-Paquetville
- Notre-Dame-des-Érables
- **Paquetville**
- Petit-Paquetville
- Rang-Saint-Georges
- Saint-Amateur
- Tracadie
- Trudel
- Val-Doucet

== Bodies of water ==
Bodies of water (Note: Not including brooks, ponds or coves.) at least partly within the parish. italics indicate a name no longer in official use

- Big Tracadie River
- Caraquet River (Southwest Caraquet River)
- Pokemouche River

== Conservation areas ==
Parks, historic sites, and related entities at least partly within the parish.

- Butte à Morrison Protected Natural Area
- Red Pine Brook Protected Natural Area
- Tracadie River Wildlife Management Area

== Demographics ==
Parish population total does not include incorporated municipalities and regional municipality

=== Population ===
Canada census – Paquetville community profile

	2021	2016	2011
Population	2,250 (-3.4% from 2016)	2,329 (-7.0% from 2011)	2,700 (+9.9% from 2006)
Land area	220.42 km^{2} (85.10 sq mi)	220.51 km^{2} (85.14 sq mi)	220.30 km^{2} (85.06 sq mi)
Population density	10.2/km^{2} (26/sq mi)	10.6/km^{2} (27/sq mi)	12.3/km^{2} (32/sq mi)
Median age	54.8 (M: 54.8, F: 54.8)	51.3 (M: 51.5, F: 51.0)	47.7 (M: 47.6, F: 47.8)
Private dwellings	1,045 (total)	1,159 (total)	1,142 (total)
Median household income		$41,440	$.N/A

Notes: 2011 income data for this area has been suppressed for data quality or confidentiality reasons.
References: 2021 2016 2011

Historical Census Data - Paquetville Parish, New Brunswick

Year	Pop.	±%
1991	2,801	—
1996	2,838	+1.3%
2001	2,649	−6.7%

Year	Pop.	±%
2006	2,457	−7.2%
2011	2,700	+9.9%
2011E	2,504	−7.3%

Year	Pop.	±%
2016	2,329	−7.0%

**(E) corrections and updates: Population and dwelling count amendments 2011**

=== Language ===
Canada Census Mother Tongue - Paquetville Parish, New Brunswick
Census	Total	French			English			French & English			Other		
Year	Responses	Count	Trend	Pop %	Count	Trend	Pop %	Count	Trend	Pop %	Count	Trend	Pop %
2011	2,680	2,590	▲9.5%	96.64%	65	▲18.2%	2.43%	25	▲ n/a%	0.93%	0	▼100.0%	0.00%
2006	2,430	2,365	▼5.4%	97.33%	55	▼42.1%	2.26%	0	0.0%	0.00%	10	▲ n/a%	0.41%
2001	2,595	2,500	▼9.1%	96.34%	95	▲26.7%	3.66%	0	▼100.0%	0.00%	0	0.0%	0.00%
1996	2,865	2,750	n/a	95.99%	75	n/a	2.62%	40	n/a	1.40%	0	n/a	0.00%

== See also ==
- List of parishes in New Brunswick
