= Caraquet Parish =

Caraquet
- Parish
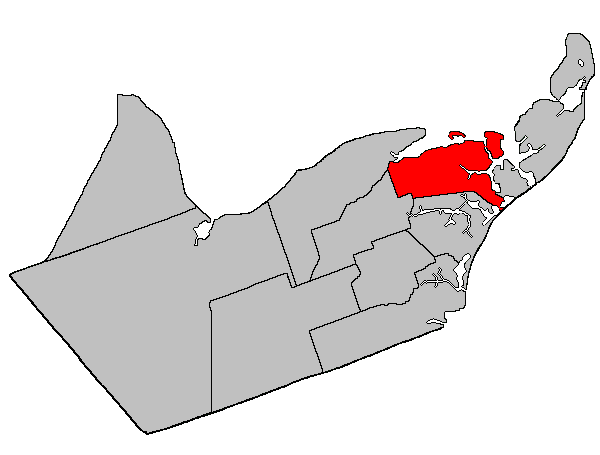
- Location within Gloucester County, New Brunswick
- Coordinates: 47.7275°N 64.875°W
- Country: Canada
- Province: New Brunswick
- County: Gloucester
- Erected: 1831

Area
  - Land: 109.32 km^{2} (42.21 sq mi)

Population (2021)
  - Total: 1,261
  - Density: 11.5/km^{2} (30/sq mi)
  - Change 2016-2021: ▼5.7%
  - Dwellings: 659
- Time zone: UTC-4 (AST)
  - Summer (DST): UTC-3 (ADT)
- Figures do not include portions within the town of Caraquet and the villages of Bas-Caraquet and Bertrand

Caraquet is a geographic parish in Gloucester County, New Brunswick, Canada. (Note: The Territorial Division Act divides the province into 152 parishes, the cities of Saint John and Fredericton, and one town of Grand Falls. The Interpretation Act clarifies that parishes include any local government within their borders.)

For governance purposes, the parish is divided between the towns of Caraquet, Hautes-Terres, Rivière-du-Nord, and Shippagan. All municipalities are members of the Acadian Peninsula Regional Service Commission (APRSC).

== Origin of name ==
Historian William F. Ganong described the origin of the name as uncertain, the Mi'kmaq Caluget possibly being their pronunciation of a French name for the area.

== History ==
Caraquet was erected in 1831 from Saumarez Parish; it originally included Shippegan Parish and Paquetville Parish.

In 1851, Shippegan was erected as its own parish.

In 1897, Paquetville was erected as its own parish.

== Boundaries ==
Caraquet Parish is bounded:

- on the north by the Caraquet River, Caraquet Bay, and Chaleur Bay;
- on the east by Baie de Shippagan, Baie Brûlé, Saint-Simon Inlet, Baie Saint-Simon-Sud (the line passing west of Île à William), a line from Baie-Saint-Simon-Sud to Baie de Petit-Pokemouche across the isthmus connecting Taylor Island to the mainland, and the Gulf of Saint Lawrence.
- on the south by the mouth of the Pokemouche River, Grande Anse, the rear line of a tier of grants along the Pokemouche River and Route 345 and its prolongation to a point 300 chains (6.035 km) inland, then in a direct line to the northwestern corner of 255 on the western side of Lavigne Road, a bit south of the end of Chemin Gauvin est.
- on the west by the rear line of grants on the west side of Lavigne Road northwesterly three grants, then slightly more westerly to the rear line of grants on the southern side of Duval Road, then southwesterly to the southernmost corner of the tier of grants, then northwesterly along the western line of the Duval Road tier and its prolongation to the Caraquet River.
- Caraquet Island, Pokesudie, L'Îlette de Pokesudie, and Munro Island are all in Caraquet Parish.

== Former Governance ==
The northern mainland of the parish was divided (before 2023) into three municipalities; from east to west, these are the village of Bas-Caraquet, the town of Caraquet, and the eastern part of the village of Bertrand. The remainder of the parish comprised four LSDs and part of a fifth. These LSDs were:

- Blanchard Settlement (August 4, 1987) assessed for the additional services of street lighting and community services, both added in 1988. Consisted of the community of Village-Blanchard (formerly Blanchard Settlement) and grants along the Waugh and Godin Roads.
- Inkerman Centre (extended into parish on April 21, 1987) assessed for the additional service of street lighting. The portion in this parish consisted of the grants south of the wetlands along Ruisseau à Jules and all of the parish south of those grants.
- Pokesudie (March 22, 1988) assessed for the additional services of street lighting (added 1988) and community services. Consisted of Pokesudie Island and Little Pokesudie Island. The community of Pokesudie is on the main island.
- St. Simon (September 22, 1971) assessed for the additional services of street lighting and recreational facilities. Consists of grants east of the former CNR line and north of the wetlands along Ruisseau à Isaac. Included the communities of Centre-Saint-Simon and Haut-Saint-Simon; the corresponding taxing authority was Saint-Simon.
- The parish of Caraquet (established 1968). Originally including all the unincorporated parts of the parish, it was eventually reduced to four mainland areas and two islands. The taxing authority was Par. de Caraquet.
1. Grants in the southwestern corner of the parish, along Thériault, Lavigne, and Haché Roads, containing more than five thousand acres.
2. Wetlands along Ruisseau à Isaac and Ruisseau à Jules.
3. Ten grants between the mouth of the Saint-Simon River and the southwestern corner of Bas-Caraquet, containing about nine hundred acres.
4. A small area on the southern bank of the Saint-Simon River where the Caraquet boundary cuts through a peninsula, containing less than five acres.
5. Munro Island
6. Caraquet Island

== Communities ==
Communities at least partly within the parish. bold indicates an incorporated municipality

- **Bas-Caraquet**
  - Middle Caraquet
  - Morais
- **Bertrand**
  - Thériault
- **Caraquet**
  - Haut-Caraquet
  - Le Bouthillier
  - Pointe-Rocheuse
  - Sainte-Anne-du-Bocage
- Centre-Saint-Simon
- Haut-Saint-Simon
- Pokesudie
- Village-Blanchard

== Bodies of water ==
Bodies of water (Note: Not including brooks, ponds or coves.) at least partly within the parish.

- Rivière à Brideau
- Petite rivière Caraquet
- Saint-Simon River
- Waugh River
- Caraquet Bay
- Caraquet Harbour
- Chaleur Bay
- Baie de Petit-Pokemouche
- Petit-Pokemouche Gully
- Pokemouche Gully
- Saint-Simon Inlet
- Baie Saint-Simon-Nord
- Baie Saint-Simon-Sud
- Shippegan Bay
- more than a half-dozen named lakes

== Islands ==
Islands at least partly within the parish.

- Caraquet Island
- Little Pokesudie Island (French L'Îlette de Pokesudie)
- Munro Island
- Pokesudie Island

== Other notable places ==
Parks, historic sites, and other noteworthy places at least partly within the parish.

- Pokemouche Airport

== Demographics ==
Parish population total does not include incorporated municipalities as they existed in 2021. Revised census figures based on the 2023 local governance reforms have not been released.

=== Population ===
Canada census – Caraquet community profile

	2021	2016	2011
Population	4,285 (+0.9% from 2016)	1,337 (-3.3% from 2011)	1,382 (-8.5% from 2006)
Land area	68.13 km^{2} (26.31 sq mi)	109.97 km^{2} (42.46 sq mi)	109.20 km^{2} (42.16 sq mi)
Population density	62.9/km^{2} (163/sq mi)	12.2/km^{2} (32/sq mi)	12.7/km^{2} (33/sq mi)
Median age	54.4 (M: 53.6, F: 55.6)	51.8 (M: 52.3, F: 51.1)	48.3 (M: 48.6, F: 48.1)
Private dwellings	2,150 (total) 1,988 (occupied)	668 (total)	618 (total)
Median household income	$65,500	$52,224	$.N/A

Notes: 2011 income data for this area has been suppressed for data quality or confidentiality reasons.
References: 2021 2016 2011

Historical Census Data - Caraquet Parish, New Brunswick

Year	Pop.	±%
1991	1,696	—
1996	1,706	+0.6%

Year	Pop.	±%
2001	1,589	−6.9%
2006	1,511	−4.9%

Year	Pop.	±%
2011	1,382	−8.5%
2016	1,337	−3.3%

=== Language ===
Canada Census Mother Tongue - Caraquet Parish, New Brunswick
Census	Total	French			English			French & English			Other		
Year	Responses	Count	Trend	Pop %	Count	Trend	Pop %	Count	Trend	Pop %	Count	Trend	Pop %
2011	1,365	1,340	▼7.6%	98.17%	25	▼37.5%	1.83%	0	0.0%	0.00%	0	▼100.0%	0.00%
2006	1,500	1,450	▼7.3%	96.67%	40	▲300.0%	2.67%	0	0.0%	0.00%	10	▲ n/a%	0.66%
2001	1,575	1,565	▼6.6%	99.36%	10	▼71.4%	0.64%	0	▼100.0%	0.00%	0	0.0%	0.00%
1996	1,720	1,675	n/a	97.38%	35	n/a	2.04%	10	n/a	0.58%	0	n/a	0.00%

== See also ==
- List of parishes in New Brunswick
