= Haut-Caraquet =

Neighbourhood in Bertrand and Caraquet, New Brunswick, Canada

- Neighbourhood
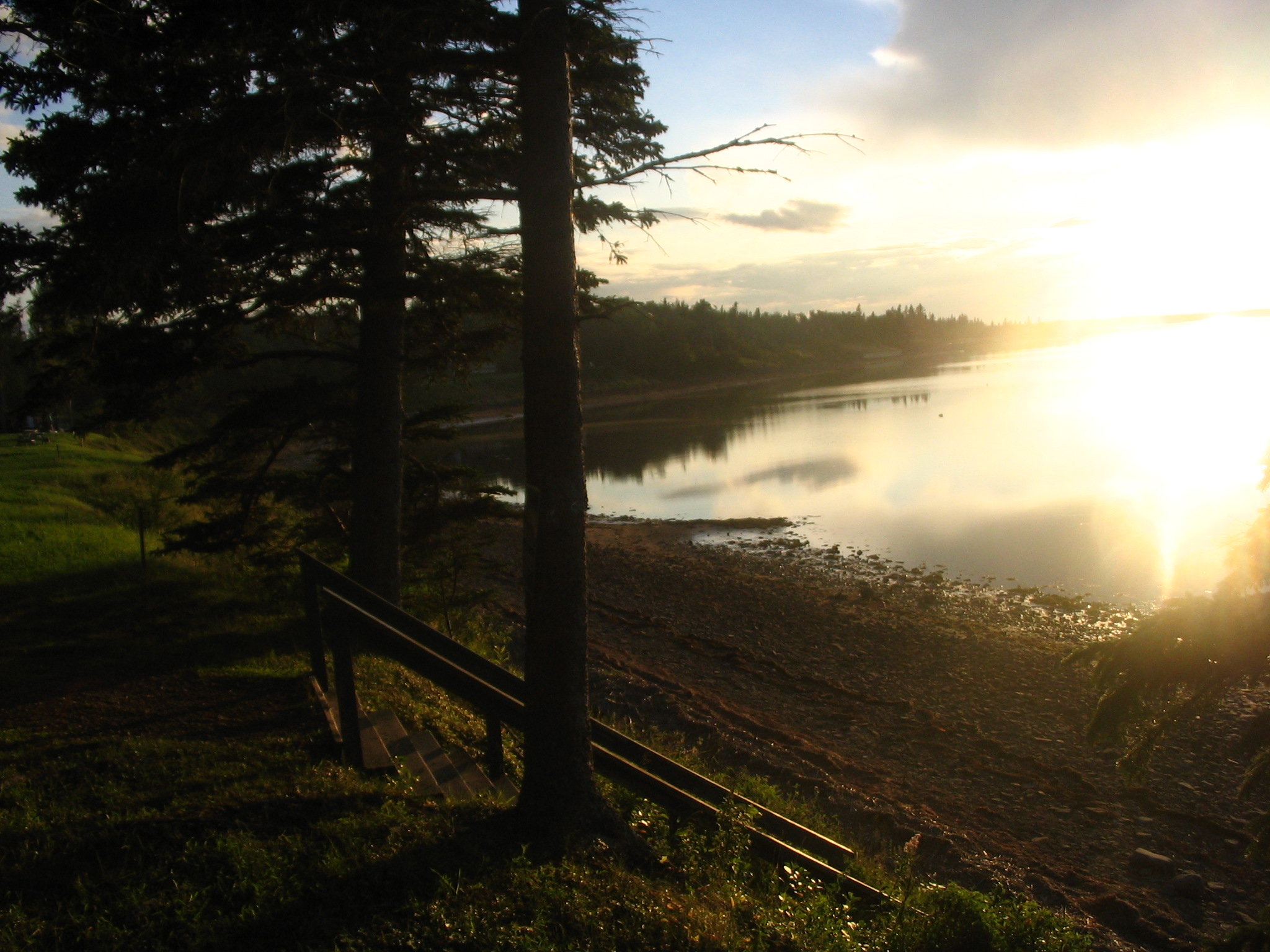
- Sunset in Haut-Caraquet

- Location within New Brunswick
- Coordinates: 47.766529°N 65.042562°W
- Country: Canada
- Province: New Brunswick
- Municipality: Caraquet
- Founded: 1757
- Founded by: Alexis Landry
- Language spoken: French

Haut-Caraquet is a neighbourhood on the Acadian Peninsula in northeastern New Brunswick, Canada, spanning parts of both the village of Bertrand and the town of Caraquet.

== Geography ==
Haut-Caraquet is bordered to the north by the Caraquet River, which converges at this point with the Rivière du Nord to form Caraquet Bay. The Little Caraquet River originates approximately 1.4 km (0.87 mi) to the south and flows eastward, eventually emptying into Caraquet Bay further downstream. The neighbourhood is situated on the northern slope of a hill that rises to over 30 m (98 ft) in elevation. A forest extends southward to Pokemouche. The shores are predominantly marshes, with two beaches present.

Haut-Caraquet is primarily aligned along Route 11, known as Boulevard des Acadiens in Bertrand and Boulevard Saint-Pierre in Caraquet. The neighbourhood begins at the Route 11 bridge over the Caraquet River in the village of Bertrand. About 2.5 km (1.6 mi) from the bridge, the town of Caraquet starts. Haut-Caraquet then extends for nearly 2 km (1.2 mi) to the vicinity of Rue de la Forge.

Haut-Caraquet adjoins the centre of Bertrand to the west and Sainte-Anne-du-Bocage to the east, with which it is sometimes conflated.

== History ==
Haut-Caraquet's history is closely tied to the broader Acadian settlement in the Caraquet region, beginning with the arrival of refugees from the Great Expulsion of the Acadians in the mid-18th century. The area was first settled around 1757 by Acadian families led by Alexis Landry, who arrived in the spring of that year with three other families after enduring British raids and a harsh winter at Miramichi. Landry, born in Grand-Pré in 1721, had married Marie Terriot and sought refuge in various locations before establishing a presence near the confluence of the Caraquet River and Rivière du Nord, in what is now the Sainte-Anne-du-Bocage area adjacent to Haut-Caraquet.

A 1761 census confirmed their settlement, but an October raid by Captain Roderick MacKenzie forced Landry and his group to temporarily relocate to Miscou Island for safety. They returned in the spring of 1768, and on March 13, 1769, Landry received official permission from George Walker to occupy the land he had claimed in 1761. Further land grants followed, including additional meadows and tidal flats along the Rivière du Nord in 1787 from Governor Thomas Carleton.

The community grew through fishing, trade, and shipbuilding, with Landry himself engaging in importing goods for cod and becoming a shipbuilder by 1775. In 1791, Landry facilitated the construction of a chapel, marking early community development. Landry died on March 6, 1798, and was buried near the sanctuary of Sainte-Anne-du-Bocage, where a monument now marks his grave since 1961.

In the 19th century, the region experienced Acadian economic and cultural expansion, particularly in maritime industries such as boat building and fish processing, influenced by Jersey merchants like the Robin family who established operations in 1837. Adjacent Bertrand, located 2.23 km southwest of Haut-Caraquet, emerged as a farming community; by 1898, it had a population of 150 and a post office from 1892, while the nearby settlement of Thériault focused on farming and lumbering with a population of 75 in 1904. The arrival of the railroad in 1887 connected the area to broader markets, boosting growth.

The 20th century brought further development, including struggles for Acadian rights, such as land ownership and French-language education, culminating in events like the 1875 Caraquet Riot. Caraquet hosted significant Acadian gatherings, including the 1905 National Convention of Acadians, and became a town in 1961. Today, the area's heritage is preserved through sites like the Caraquet Heritage Route, established in 2009.

== Economy ==
Haut-Caraquet functions as a vacation destination and residential area. It boasts dozens of cottages, bed and breakfasts, a campground, and a tourist complex encompassing a campground, water park, and motel. However, it also hosts a few light industries, including a construction firm and an aquaculture operation. Additionally, there are several farms and various commercial businesses.

== Culture ==
Haut-Caraquet, as part of the larger town of Caraquet, shares in the rich Acadian cultural heritage that has earned Caraquet the title of Cultural Capital of Canada in 2003 and 2009. The neighbourhood reflects a blend of traditional Acadian customs with contemporary artistic expressions, emphasizing community, music, and storytelling.

=== Architecture and monuments ===
Haut-Caraquet preserves examples of traditional Acadian architecture, such as the Dugas House built in 1923, which serves as the Oyster Ecomuseum and represents early 20th-century commercial and residential design in the region. The neighbourhood's architectural heritage is further highlighted at the nearby Village Historique Acadien, which features relocated structures from Haut-Caraquet, including the Chas. J. L. Godin General Store from 1889, showcasing Acadian building techniques and daily life from the 18th to 20th centuries. Monuments in the adjacent Sainte-Anne-du-Bocage area, such as the one marking Alexis Landry's grave since 1961, commemorate the founding of the Acadian community.

=== Museum ===
The neighbourhood features the Oyster Ecomuseum, located in the historic Dugas House at 675 Boulevard Saint-Pierre Ouest, built in 1923 by Théophile A. Dugas with an adjoining residence added in 1934. Originally a general store operated by the Dugas family for three generations, it specialized in the local "La Caraquette" oyster variety before being transformed into an oyster-themed museum and gift shop in the late 1900s. Designated a Local Historic Place for its architectural and historical significance, the museum offers Acadian-style oyster tastings, demonstrations on opening and preparing oysters, and exhibits including one on Acadian privateers added during the 2009 World Acadian Congress.

=== Festivals and events ===
Haut-Caraquet participates in Caraquet's vibrant festival scene, which celebrates Acadian identity and attracts visitors from across the region. The Festival Acadien de Caraquet, held annually in August, is the largest Acadian celebration, featuring artists, shows, community activities, and the iconic Tintamarre parade on National Acadian Day, August 15, where participants make noise to affirm their cultural presence. Other notable festivals include the Festival Acadien de Poésie, promoting French-language poetry; the Festival de Théâtre Jeunesse en Acadie, focusing on youth theater; and the Festival des Arts Visuels en Atlantique, showcasing visual arts. Seasonal events like Le Congé de Mars offer winter activities, blending traditional and modern cultural expressions.

=== Arts and language ===
The arts thrive in Haut-Caraquet through Caraquet's approximately thirty cultural organizations, with venues like the Centre Culturel hosting the Galerie Bernard-Jean for visual art exhibitions and artistic residencies. The Carrefour de la Mer provides indoor and outdoor performance spaces, while the Quai des Artistes features summer exhibitions in colorful shacks on stilts. Performances often highlight Acadian themes, including folk music, rock, theater, and circus acts. The predominant language is French, specifically Acadian French, which includes distinct accents, traditional words, and regional dialects that preserve the community's linguistic heritage.

== Neighbouring communities ==
Northwest	North	Northeast
Caraquet River	Village-des-Poirier; Caraquet Bay	Caraquet Bay
West		East
Centre de Bertrand	Haut-Caraquet	Sainte-Anne-du-Bocage
Southwest	South	Southeast
Thériault	Petite Rivière Caraquet	Petite Rivière Caraquet

== See also ==
- Geography of New Brunswick
- Architectural heritage and monuments of Caraquet
- Acadian Peninsula
- Acadians
- Acadian diaspora
- Caraquet Bay
- Village Historique Acadien
