= Rivière-du-Nord, New Brunswick =

Rivière-du-Nord
- Town
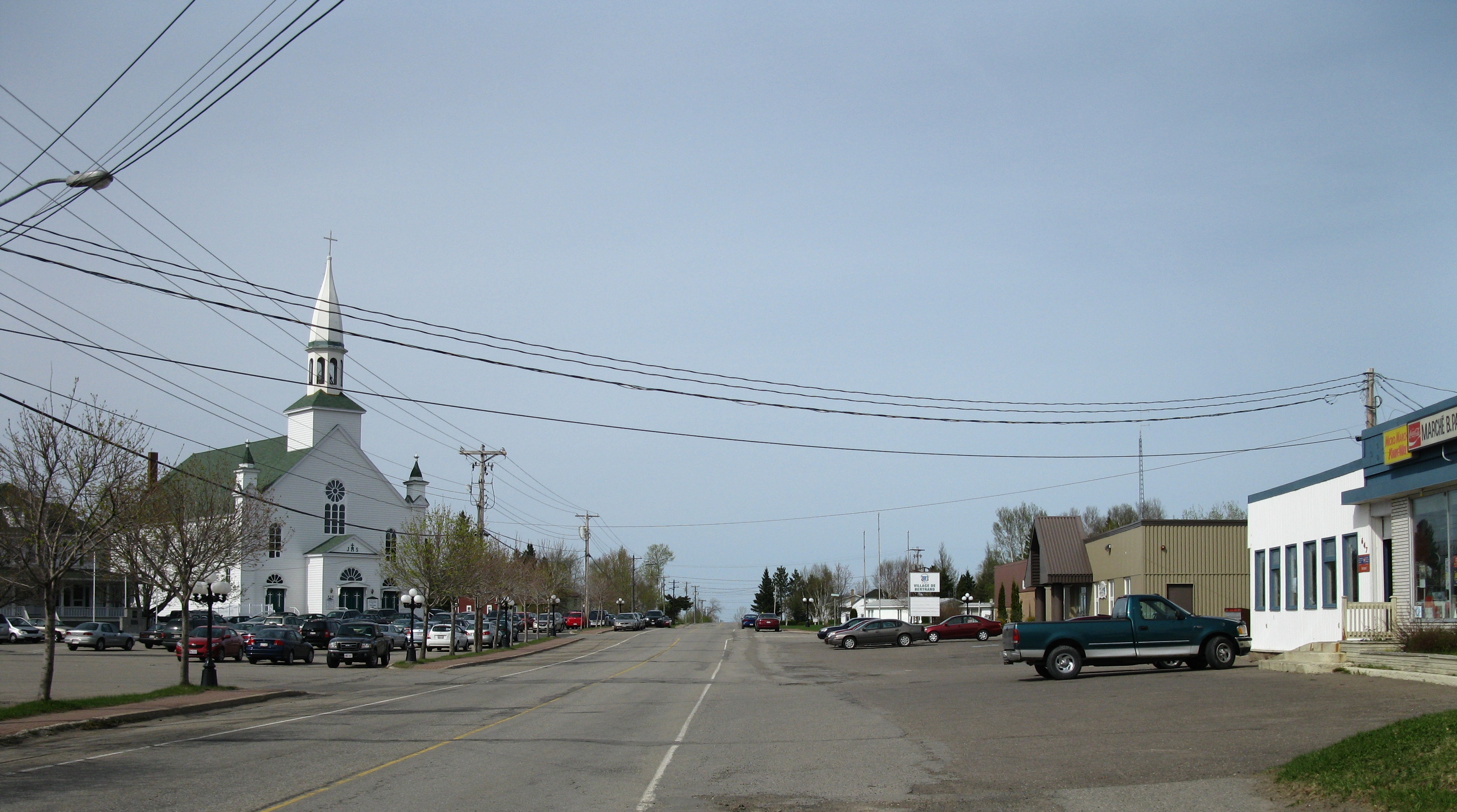

- Location within New Brunswick
- Coordinates: 47°45′N 65°04′W
- Country: Canada
- Province: New Brunswick
- County: Gloucester
- Regional service commission: Acadian Peninsula
- Incorporated: January 1, 2023
- Electoral Districts Federal: Acadie—Bathurst
- Provincial: Caraquet

Government
  - Mayor: Guy Thériault
  - MP: Serge Cormier (Liberal)
  - MLA: Isabelle Thériault (Lib.)
- Time zone: UTC-4 (AST)
  - Summer (DST): UTC-3 (ADT)
- Postal code(s): E1W
- Area code: 506
- Highways Route 11: Route 325

Rivière-du-Nord (French pronunciation: [ʁivjɛʁ dy nɔʁ]) is a town in the Canadian province of New Brunswick. It was formed through the 2023 New Brunswick local governance reforms.

== History ==
Rivière-du-Nord was incorporated on January 1, 2023, via the amalgamation of the former villages of Bertrand, Maisonnette, Grande-Anse, and Saint-Léolin as well as the concurrent annexation of adjacent unincorporated areas.

== Geography ==
The town is located on the Acadian Peninsula at the mouth of the Caraquet River where it empties into Caraquet Bay, roughly 10 km west of Caraquet. The town centres around the intersection of Route 11, Route 145 and Route 325.

== See also ==
- List of communities in New Brunswick
- List of municipalities in New Brunswick
