= Caraquet and Gulf Shore Railway =

Short line railway in New Brunswick, Canada

The Caraquet and Gulf Shore Railway was a short line railway on the south shore of Chaleur Bay in New Brunswick that ran for 75 miles between Bathurst and Tracadie with a spur line to Shippagan. Completed in 1890, it became part of the Canadian National Railway in 1923 as the Caraquet Subdivision, remaining in operation until 1986.

== History ==
In the early 1870s, the forest on the shores of Chaleur Bay were seen to be receding. A group of Bathurst townspeople involved in the lumber trade imagined that the area around Tracadie could serve to feed their industry if only a suitable form of transport could be arranged. Thus was born the Caraquet Railway Company on 18 April 1874. The first contracts were not let until a decade later.

On 7 August 1884, the sod-turning for the Caraquet Railway occurred, with luminaries like Kennedy Francis Burns in attendance. On 30 June 1885 the first section from Bathurst to Stonehaven was completed. Two years later approximately 30 km of rail had been laid. It was completed by 1890, but not before controversy exploded into public view. In 1889 there was a major scandal when the shareholders accused Burns of fraudulent schemes and false representation in regard to the construction and the issuing of shares. He was exposed in Parliament by Edward Blake. Throughout his career as a businessman, Burns mainly employed Acadian workers, paid with due-bills, which could be exchanged only at the company store. He was supported in this artifice by catholic Bishop James Rogers. Burns was the beneficiary of governmental largesse in the form of railroad subsidies and cutting licences for timber on New Brunswick crown lands.

The railway ran from Gloucester Junction on the Intercolonial Railway main line just outside of Bathurst. A three-stall roundhouse near the Bathurst Station served as the terminal for the railway’s small fleet of rolling stock. In 1908, the line’s timetable listed 23 stops, such as Stonehaven, Grande-Anse, Burnsville and Caraquet along the line from Bathurst to Shippagan.

On 13 April 1911, the Caraquet Railway Company merged with the Gulf Shore Company, which had opened for business in July 1897 and connected Pokemouche Junction with Sheila. With the merger came a new name, and the Caraquet and Gulf Shore Railway was born.

In May 1918, the Dominion government offered $200,000 to purchase the railway, but the owners were somewhat reluctant because the capital invested to date was on the order of ten times that sum. But the C&GS had been built by government programmes, so the Minister of Public Works could be firm:

"We offered the owners $200,000.00 for the railway; they cannot make 200,000 cents out of it in the next ten years. We won't arbitrate, we won't pay more, we think they will take it."

The C&GS was absorbed by the Canadian Government Railways system on 1 June 1920 for the original offer. It became the Caraquet Subdivision of the newly created Canadian National Railway crown corporation in 1923.

A brakeman who joined the company in 1919 remembered the C&GS as a slow-moving mixed train of people, livestock and freight that stopped anywhere and everywhere. McCarthy (1997) relates a tale of how, during the great blizzard of 1935, men were employed at a rate of $2 a day to clear a path in the snow down to the rails.

Passenger service was switched to buses in the mid 1950s. Freight service declined to three trains a week in later years. Canadian National ran its last trains on the line in 1986 and abandonment was approved in 1988. A short 4-mile section from Gloucester Junction to East Bathurst remained in operation as the Caraquet Spur serving several industrial customers until 2005 when all remaining tracks were lifted. The line became a Rails to Trails recreational pathway with a portion in East Bathurst forming the start of the Nepisiguit Mi'gmaq Trail.
