= Paquetville =

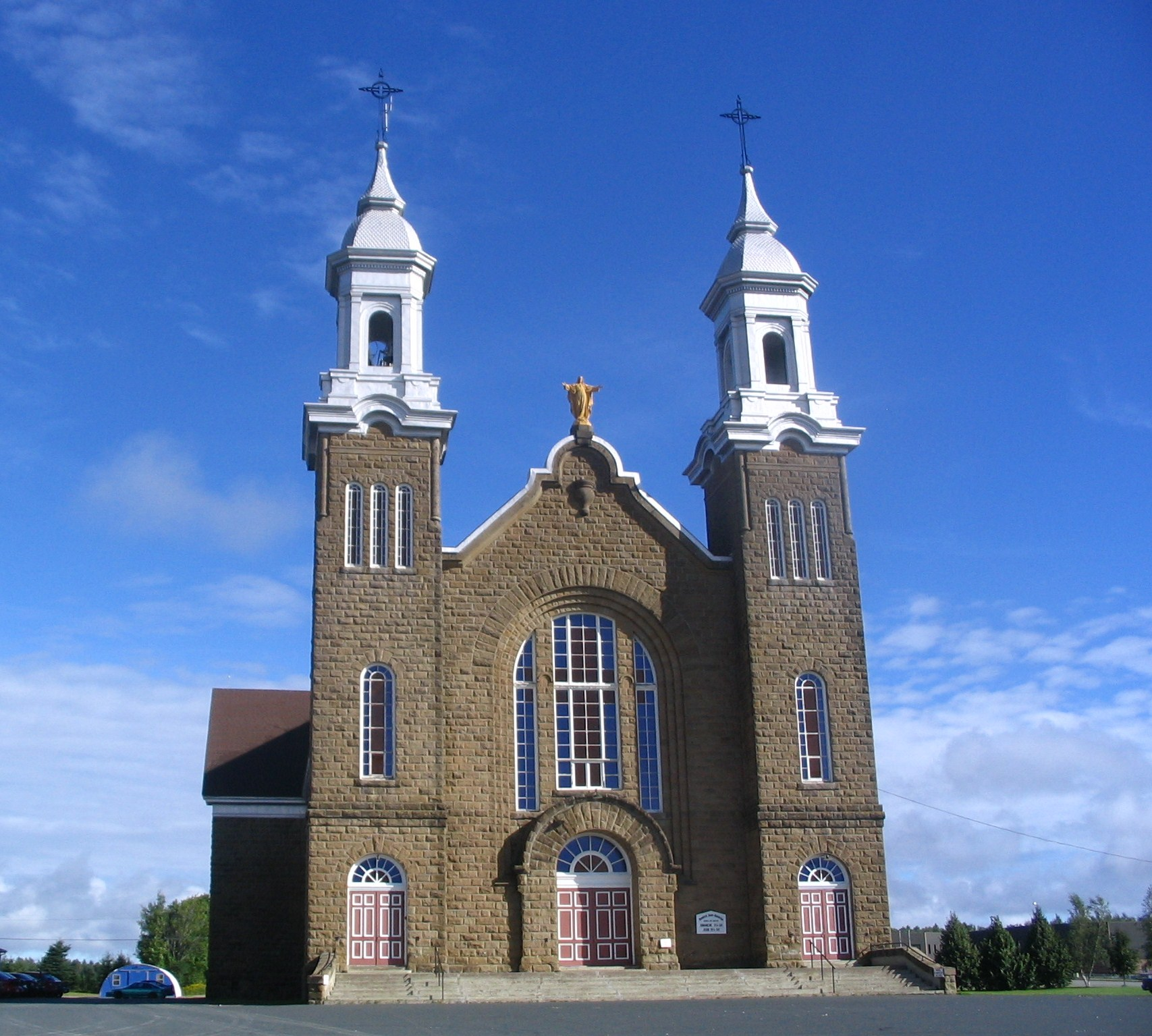

- Location within New Brunswick.
- Coordinates: 47.668889°N 65.099167°W
- Country: Canada
- Province: New Brunswick
- County: Gloucester
- Parish: Paquetville
- Town: Hautes-Terres
- Established: 1866
- Village Status: 1966
- Electoral Districts Federal: Acadie—Bathurst
- Provincial: Centre-Péninsule-Saint-Sauveur

Area
  - Land: 9.26 km^{2} (3.58 sq mi)

Population (2021)
  - Total: 718
  - Density: 77.5/km^{2} (201/sq mi)
  - Change (2016–21): ▼0.3%
  - Dwellings: 359
- Time zone: UTC-4 (AST)
  - Summer (DST): UTC-3 (ADT)
- Postal code(s): E8R
- Area code: 506
- Highways Route 135: Route 340; Route 350

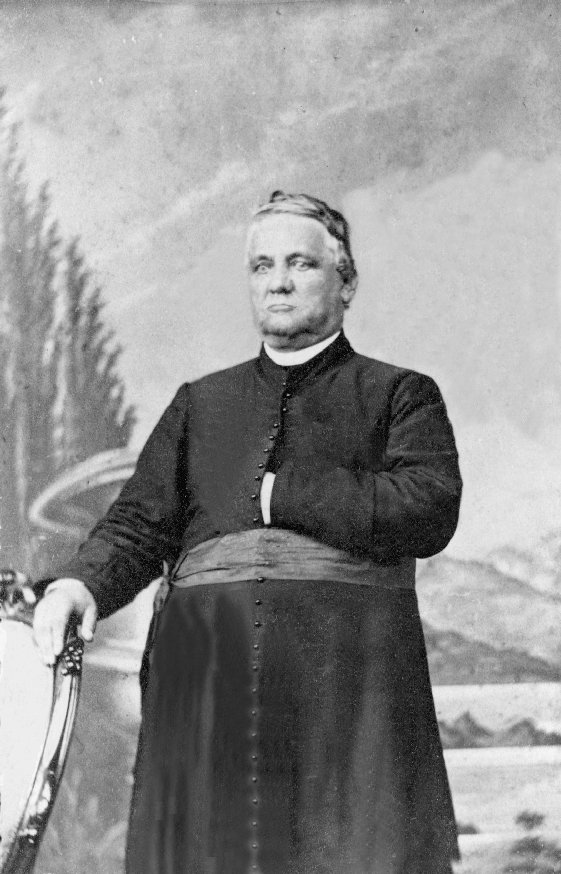
Monseigneur Paquet, founder of Paquetville

Paquetville is a former village in Gloucester County, New Brunswick, Canada. It held village status prior to 2023 and is now part of the town of Hautes-Terres. It is on the Acadian Peninsula at the intersection of Route 340, Route 135 and Route 350.

== History ==
Paquetville was founded by Monseigneur Paquet in 1873, who brought several parishioners with him from Shippagan.

On 1 January 2023, Paquetville amalgamated with the village of Saint-Isidore and all or part of six local service districts to form the new town of Hautes-Terres. The community's name remains in official use.

== Demographics ==
Historical Census Data - Paquetville
Year	Pop.	±%
1991	688	—
1996	731	+6.2%
2001	667	−8.8%
2006	642	−3.7%
2011	706	+10.0%
2016	720	+2.0%
2021	718	−0.3%

In the 2021 Census of Population conducted by Statistics Canada, Paquetville had a population of 718 living in 324 of its 359 total private dwellings, a change of −0.3% from its 2016 population of 720. With a land area of 9.26 km^{2} (3.58 sq mi), it had a population density of 77.5/km^{2} (200.8/sq mi) in 2021.

Canada census – Paquetville community profile

	2021	2016	2011
Population	718 (-0.3% from 2016)	720 (+2.0% from 2011)	706 (+10.0% from 2006)
Land area	9.26 km^{2} (3.58 sq mi)	9.26 km^{2} (3.58 sq mi)	9.40 km^{2} (3.63 sq mi)
Population density	77.5/km^{2} (201/sq mi)	77.8/km^{2} (202/sq mi)	75.1/km^{2} (195/sq mi)
Median age	53.2 (M: 51.2, F: 54.8)	48.9 (M: 45.8, F: 51.5)	46.9 (M: 45.6, F: 48.3)
Private dwellings	325 (total)	346 (total)	309 (total)
Median household income		$48,896	$52,040

References: 2021 2016 2011

=== Language ===
Canada Census Mother Tongue - Municipality, Quebec
Census	Total	French			English			French & English			Other		
Year	Responses	Count	Trend	Pop %	Count	Trend	Pop %	Count	Trend	Pop %	Count	Trend	Pop %
2021	680	675	▲0.7%	99.26%	5	▼66.7%	0.74%	0	0.0%	0.00%	0	▼100.0%	0.00%
2016	690	670	▲3.1%	97.10%	15	0.0%	2.17%	0	▼100.0%	0.00%	5	0.0%	0.72%
2011	680	650	▲13.0%	95.59%	15	▲50.0%	2.21%	10	▼33.3%	1.47%	5	▲ n/a%	0.73%
2006	600	575	▼10.8%	95.83%	10	0.0%	1.67%	15	▲ n/a%	2.50%	0	0.0%	0.00%
2001	655	645	0.0%	98.47%	10	▼50.0%	1.53%	0	0.0%	0.00%	0	0.0%	0.00%
1996	665	645	n/a	96.99%	20	n/a	3.01%	0	n/a	0.00%	0	n/a	0.00%

== Notable people ==
The village is the home of Édith Butler, who sings the song Paquetville.

== See also ==
- List of communities in New Brunswick
