= Stonehaven, New Brunswick =

Stonehaven
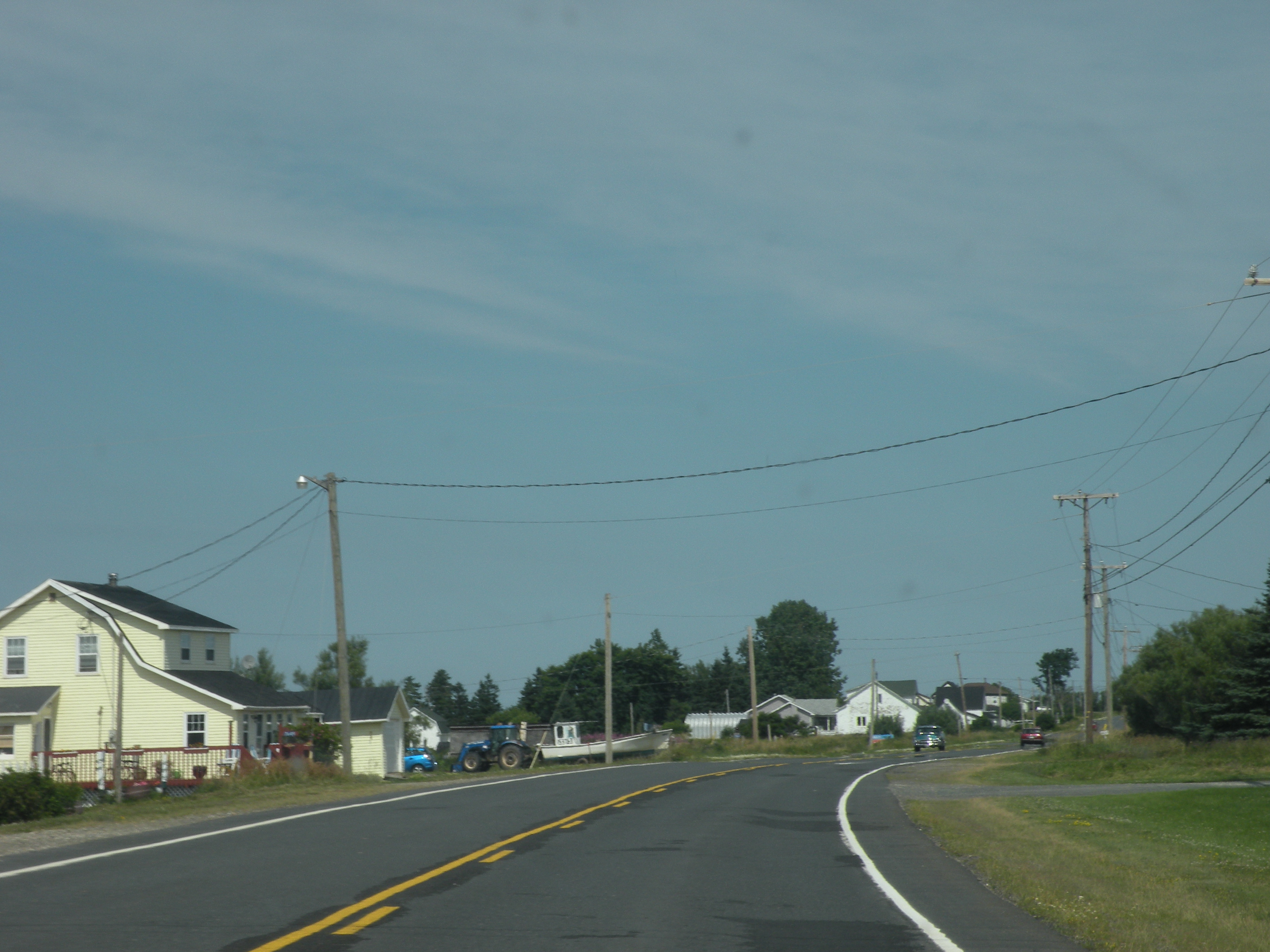
- Vue Stonehaven
- Interactive map of Stonehaven
- Coordinates: 47.75°N 65.36°W
- Country: Canada
- Province: New Brunswick
- County: Gloucester
- Parish: New Bandon
- Time zone: UTC-4 (AST)
  - Summer (DST): UTC-3 (ADT)
- Postal code(s): E2A
- Area codes: 506: Area exchanges: 226, 350, 480, 543, 544, 545, 546, 547, 548, 549
- NTS Map: 021P12
- GNBC Code: DAFQX
- Stonehaven Lighthouse
- Constructed: 1885 (first); 1922 (second)
- Foundation: concrete base
- Construction: metal skeletal tower
- Height: 8 m (26 ft)
- Shape: square prism skeletal tower with light
- Deactivated: 1922 (first) n/a (second)
- Focal height: 21 m (69 ft)
- Range: 10 nmi (19 km; 12 mi)
- Characteristic: Fl W 4s

Stonehaven is a Canadian rural community in Gloucester County, New Brunswick, in the parish of New Bandon. Situated about 30 kilometres (19 mi) east of Bathurst on Route 11, Stonehaven is on the southern shore of the Baie des Chaleurs (English: Chaleur Bay).

Stonehaven is the site of a harbour.

Full medical services are provided by Chaleur Regional Hospital, part of the la Régie de la santé Acadie-Bathurst Health Authority located in Bathurst.

Fire protection is provided by the New Bandon - Salmon Beach volunteer fire department located in Janeville.

Air transport is available at Bathurst Airport (ZBF/CZBF).

== History ==
The area was settled in the early nineteenth century by Irish, Scottish and English immigrants. To the east of Stonehaven are Grande Anse and Caraquet, which were settled by Acadians.

Industry in Stonehaven in the late nineteenth and early twentieth centuries included quarrying of sandstone for grindstones by the Read Stone Company, family farming, inshore fishing, and lobster canning. With the depletion of cod stocks, fishing is largely confined to lobster.

== See also ==
- List of lighthouses in New Brunswick
- List of communities in New Brunswick
