= New Bandon =

New Bandon is the name of the following places in the Canadian province of New Brunswick:

- New Bandon-Salmon Beach
- New Bandon Parish
- New Bandon, Gloucester County, New Brunswick, a rural community
- New Bandon, Northumberland County, New Brunswick
