= Norman =

Norman or Normans may refer to:

== Ethnic and cultural identity ==
- The Normans, a people partly descended from Norse Vikings who settled in the territory of Normandy in France in the 9th and 10th centuries
  - People or things connected with the Norman conquest of southern Italy in the 11th and 12th centuries
  - People of things connected with Norman England, following the conquest in the 11th century
  - Normanist theory (also known as Normanism) and anti-Normanism, historical disagreement regarding the origin of Russia, Ukraine, Belarus and their historic predecessor, Kievan Rus'
  - Norman dynasty, a series of monarchs in England and Normandy
  - Norman architecture, romanesque architecture in England and elsewhere
  - Norman language, spoken in Normandy
  - People or things connected with the French region of Normandy

== Arts and entertainment ==
- Norman (2010 film), a 2010 drama film
- Norman (2016 film), a 2016 drama film
- Norman (TV series), a 1970 British sitcom starring Norman Wisdom
- The Normans (TV series), a documentary
- "Norman" (song), a 1962 song written by John D. Loudermilk and recorded by Sue Thompson
- "Norman (He's a Rebel)", a song by Mo-dettes from The Story So Far, 1980

== Businesses ==
- Norman ASA, producers of antivirus and other security software
- Norman Cycles, a British bicycle, autocycle, moped, and motorcycle manufacturer
- Norman Guitars, a guitar brand from Canada

== People ==
- Norman (name), including list of persons and fictional characters with the name
- Montagu Norman, 1st Baron Norman (1871–1950), English banker, Governor of the Bank of England from 1920 to 1944
- Norman baronets, a title in the Baronetage of the United Kingdom

== Places ==
=== United States ===
- Norman, Arkansas, a town
- Norman, Indiana, an unincorporated community
- Norman, Missouri, an unincorporated community
- Norman, Nebraska, a village
- Norman, North Carolina, a town
- Lake Norman, North Carolina, a man-made lake
- Norman, Oklahoma, a city
- Norman, Wisconsin, an unincorporated community
- Norman Township (disambiguation)

=== Elsewhere ===
- Norman, Ontario, former name of two places in Ontario
- Norman Island, British Virgin Islands
- Cape Norman, Newfoundland, Canada
- Norman (crater), on the Moon

== Ships and boats ==
- HMAS Norman, several ships of the Royal Australian Navy
- SS Norman, an American bulk freighter which sank in 1895
- Norman boat, a cabin cruiser built by Norman Cruisers limited

== Other uses ==
- List of storms named Norman, storms with the name Norman
- Norman High School, Norman, Oklahoma, United States
- Norman (horse), a Thoroughbred racehorse
- Norman four notrump, a slam bidding convention in the card game contract bridge
- Terry-Norman rifle, early bolt-action rifle adopted by the Russian armed forces

== See also ==
- Norman House, on Steep Hill, Lincoln, England, an historic building
- The Norman House (York), a grade I listed building and scheduled monument in York, England
- Normand, a surname
