= New Brunswick Route 325 =

Highway in New Brunswick, Canada

Route 325

Route information
- Maintained by New Brunswick Department of Transportation
- Length: 8.97 km (5.57 mi)
- Existed: 2001–present

Major junctions
- North end: Route 11 / Route 145 in Caraquet
- South end: Route 135 in Trudel

Location
- Country: Canada
- Province: New Brunswick
- Major cities: Bertrand, Caraquet

Highway system
- Provincial highways in New Brunswick; Former routes
← Route 322	→ Route 330

Route 325 is a 9-kilometre (5.6 mi) long north–south secondary highway in the southwest portion of New Brunswick, Canada.

The route's eastern terminus is in the community of Bertrand. The road travels south-west to the community of Haut-Bertrand. From there, the road continues to Trudel as Chemin Saint-Amateur at the intersection with Route 135. Route 325 is a connector from the Centre-Peninsule area around Hautes-Terres to the Caraquet region. Except for one small section at the western end of the route, its entire length is within Bertrand village limits and does not cross any major rivers.

== History ==
October 2016 the route was extended continuing where the former Route 11 used to be.

== Intersecting routes ==
- New Brunswick Route 135
- New Brunswick Route 145
