= Bathurst Parish =

Bathurst
- Parish
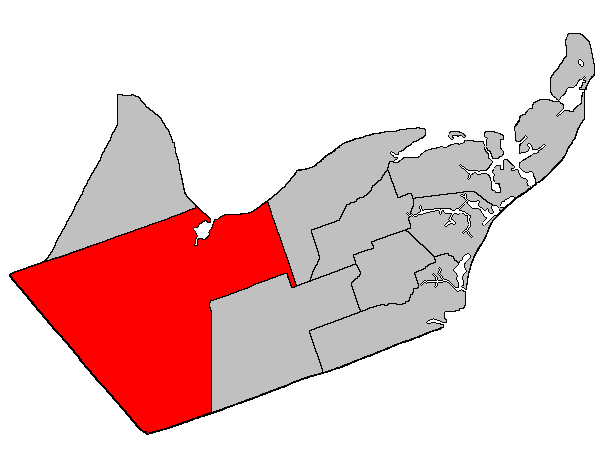
- Location within Gloucester County, New Brunswick
- Coordinates: 47.46°N 65.86°W
- Country: Canada
- Province: New Brunswick
- County: Gloucester
- Erected: 1827

Area
  - Land: 1,502.74 km^{2} (580.21 sq mi)

Population (2021)
  - Total: 4,761
  - Density: 3.2/km^{2} (8.3/sq mi)
  - Change 2016-2021: ▼0.8%
  - Dwellings: 2,293
- Time zone: UTC-4 (AST)
  - Summer (DST): UTC-3 (ADT)
- Figures do not include portions within the city of Bathurst, the town of Beresford, and the Pabineau 11 Indian reserve

Bathurst is a geographic parish in Gloucester County, New Brunswick, Canada. (Note: The Territorial Division Act divides the province into 152 parishes, the cities of Saint John and Fredericton, and one town of Grand Falls. The Interpretation Act clarifies that parishes include any local government within their borders.)

For governance purposes, the parish is divided between the city of Bathurst, the town of Belle-Baie, and the Chaleur rural district, as well as the Pabineau 11 Indian reserve; the city, town, and village are all part of the Chaleur Regional Service Commission.

Prior to the 2023 governance reform, the parish was divided between Bathurst, the town of Beresford, the Indian reserve, and six local service districts: Allardville, Big River, Dunlop, New Bandon-Salmon Beach, North Tetagouche, and the parish of Bathurst; In the 2023 reform, (Note: The original white paper maps showed the existing and proposed governance boundaries; these maps are still visible as thumbnails on the provincial government map page.) Bathurst annexed most of North Tetagouche, the northern part of Big River, a part of New Bandon-Salmon Beach along Currie Street, and parts of the LSD of the parish of Bathurst including the communities of Chamberlain Settlement, Gloucester Junction, and Sainte-Anne; Beresford became part of Belle-Baie, annexing Dunlop and small parts of the parish LSD; Allardville and the remaining parts of Big River, New Bandon-Salmon Beach, and the parish LSD became part of the rural district.

== Origin of name ==
The parish was named in honour of Earl Bathurst, British Secretary of State for War and the Colonies at the time of its erection.

== History ==
Bathurst was erected in 1827 from the western part of Saumarez Parish. Its eastern boundary followed Teagues Brook to its head and ran south "to the county line", which it doesn't actually reach.

In 1850, the eastern boundary was altered to match the northern end of the modern parish line then along its prolongation to the county line, trading areas with New Bandon Parish.

In 1947, a large area in the southeastern part of the parish was included in the newly erected Allardville Parish.

== Boundaries ==
Bathurst Parish is bounded:

- on the north by Nepisiguit Bay;
- on the east by a grant line that crosses the junction of Route 11 and Route 340 near Janeville, then southerly by the line and its prolongation to Tier 1 of the Allardville East Settlement, which runs along the northern side of Route 160, then briefly westerly along Tier 1 to the prolongation of the boundary of the Tracadie River Game Management area, at a right angle and northerly along the boundary of the GMA, then at a right angle and westerly along the prolongation of the southern line of two grants south of Goodwin Mills Road to the Canadian National Railway line, then southerly along the railway to the Northumberland County line;
- on the south by the county line;
- on the northwest by the prolongation of the northern lines of two grants on the north side of Kent Lodge Road in Beresford from Nepisiguit Bay to the county line;
- the parish also includes any islands in front of it.

== Former governance ==
The LSDs all assessed for community & recreation services; all except New Bandon-Salmon Beach also had street lighting.

- Bathurst is located around Bathurst Harbour and contains most of the population. Population in 2016 was 11,897.
- Beresford extended into the parish on the northwestern corner of Bathurst, between the railway and the coast. No separate population figure for Bathurst Parish portion.
- Pabineau 11 Indian reserve straddles the Nepisiguit River at the mouth of the Pabineau River. Population in 2016 was 134.
- Big River extended inland from the southern edge of Bathurst, along Route 340 past the Pabineau reserve, and along the Little River Road. It was established in 1989 to add street lighting. Population in 2016 was 721.
- North Tetagouche sat between the Beresford Parish line and the Tetagouche River from Bathurst to the end of North Tetagouche Road, excluding a small area that was included in Dunlop. It was established in 1987 to provide community services. Population in 2016 was 945.
- Allardville, mainly in Allardville Parish, included about 200 hectares along Route 134, south of Goodwin Mill Road. 2016 population not profiled for this portion.
- Dunlop, mainly in Beresford Parish, extended into the parish about a half kilometre along Route 315. 2016 population not profiled for this portion.
- New Bandon-Salmon Beach, partly in New Bandon Parish, included all of the parish east of Bathurst and the rear line of the tier of grants along Route 134. Population of the Bathurst Parish portion in 2016 was 354.
- The local service district of the parish of Bathurst comprised the remainder of the parish. It was established in 1969 and originally included all of the parish outside Bathurst and Beresford. Several service areas were formerly defined to provide street lighting but were deleted in 2008 after residents of the remainder of the LSD voted to add street lighting; These were sometimes erroneously called LSDs.
  - Poirier Subdivision, established 1985. A subdivision off Route 134 near the southern border of Bathurst.
  - Lone Pine and Napier Heights, established 1987. A subdivision area on the south bank of the Tetagouche River, near the western boundary of Bathurst.
  - Sainte-Anne, established 1990. On the western border of Bathurst, from the Tetagouche River to Sainte-Anne Road south of Power Drive.
  - Tetagouche Falls Estates, established 1990. Subdivision off Route 180, including Apple Street and Birch Drive.
  - Rough Waters-Gloucester Junction-Chamberlain Settlement, established 1990. On southern border of Bathurst, along Chamberlain Settlement Road and Gloucester Junction Road.
  - Middle River-Rio Grande, established 1995. On the southwestern border of Bathurst and extending along Thériault Road and Rio Grande Road.

== Communities ==
Communities at least partly within the parish; (brackets) indicate the LSD; italics indicate a name not used on modern provincial government maps

- Allardville (A) straddles the parish line along Route 134
- Bathurst
  - Bass River, Carron Point, Cross Roads, East Bathurst, Rough Waters, Roy Settlement, St. Mary, Sand Hill, South Bathurst, Vallée-Lourdes, West Bathurst, Youghall
- Bathurst Mines (B) is about 20 km (12 mi) south-southwest of Bathurst, on the Nepisiguit River
- Beresford straddles the parish line on the northwestern corner of Bathurst
- Big River (BR) is along Route 430 on the southern border of Bathurst
- Blue Mountain Settlement (BR) is along Route 430, north of the Pabineau 11 reserve
- Brunswick Mines (B) is about 15 km (9.3 mi) southwest of Bathurst, on the South Branch Little River
- Chamberlain Settlement (B) is south of Bathurst, east of the Nepisiguit River
- Glen Anglin (NBSB) is now part of Janeville
- Gloucester Junction (B) is along the Gloucester Junction Road, south of Chamberlain Settlement
- Goodwin Mill (B) is along Goodwin Mill Road, north of Allardville
- Janeville (NBSB) is on Chaleur Bay, straddling the eastern parish line
- Middle Landing (B) is inland where Route 360 crosses the Nepisiguit River
- Miller Brook is now part of Salmon Beach
- Nepisiguit Junction (BR) is at the junction of Route 430 and the CN railway
- North Tetagouche (NT)
- Pabineau 11
- Pabineau Falls (BR) is north of the Indian reserve (Note: The provincial 911 system lists it separately from the reserve.)
- Rio Grande (B) is west of Bathurst
- Rosehill is now part of South Tetagouche
- Sainte-Anne (B) is on the western border of Bathurst
- Salmon Beach (NBSB) in on Chaleur Bay, on eastern border of Bathurst
- South Tetagouche (B)
- Upper Rosehill was along Daigle Road, now part of South Tetagouche
- railway points along the eastern edge of the parish: Bartibog Station, Bruce Siding, Red Pine, Russell

== Bodies of water ==
Bodies of water (Note: Not including brooks, ponds or coves.) at least partly within the parish.

- Bass River
- Big Tracadie River
- Little River
- Little Bass River
- Middle River
- Nepisiguit River
- Pabineau River
- Peters River
- Portage River
- Tetagouche River
- Bathurst Basin
- Bathurst Harbour
- Nepisiguit Bay
- at least 8 officially named lakes

== Islands ==
Islands at least partly within the parish.

- Indian Island (in Bathurst Harbour)
- Pabineau Island
- Sipisgoatagantjitjg (group of islets in Bathurst Harbour)
- at least 7 other named river islands

== Other notable places ==
Parks, historic sites, and other noteworthy places at least partly within the parish.

- Allardville Protected Natural Area
- Bass Brook Protected Natural Area
- Bathurst Mines
- Bathurst Regional Airport
- Brunswick Mines
- East Branch Portage River Protected Natural Area
- Gordon Meadow Brook Protected Natural Area
- Key Anacon Mine
- Tracadie River Wildlife Management Area

== Demographics ==
=== Population ===
Parish population total does not include former municipalities or Indian reserve. Revised census figures based on the 2023 local governance reforms have not been released.

Canada census – Bathurst community profile

	2021	2016	2011
Population	4,761 (-0.8% from 2016)	4,797 (-3.7% from 2011)	4,979 (-3.2% from 2006)
Land area	1,502.74 km^{2} (580.21 sq mi)	1,504.87 km^{2} (581.03 sq mi)	1,504.80 km^{2} (581.01 sq mi)
Population density	3.2/km^{2} (8.3/sq mi)	3.2/km^{2} (8.3/sq mi)	3.3/km^{2} (8.5/sq mi)
Median age	52.4 (M: 52.8, F: 52.0)	50.1 (M: 50.1, F: 50.1)	47.1 (M: 47.7, F: 46.7)
Private dwellings	2,293 (total) 2,103 (occupied)	2,292 (total)	2,223 (total)
Median household income	$72,500	$64,597	$54,540

References: 2021 2016 2011

Historical Census Data - Bathurst Parish, New Brunswick

Year	Pop.	±%
1991	5,929	—
1996	5,785	−2.4%

Year	Pop.	±%
2001	5,494	−5.0%
2006	5,144	−6.4%

Year	Pop.	±%
2011	4,979	−3.2%
2016	4,797	−3.7%

=== Language ===
Canada Census Mother Tongue – Bathurst Parish, New Brunswick
Census	Total	French			English			French & English			Other		
Year	Responses	Count	Trend	Pop %	Count	Trend	Pop %	Count	Trend	Pop %	Count	Trend	Pop %
2021	4,750	2,225	▼5.52%	46.84%	2,315	▲1.09%	48.73%	170	▲61.90%	3.58%	45	▲28.57%	0.95%
2016	4,780	2,355	▼1.23%	49.27%	2,290	▼1.04%	47.91%	105	0.0%	2.20%	35	▲16.67%	0.73%
2011	4,965	2,435	▲4.7%	49.04%	2,395	▼10.0%	48.24%	105	▲40.0%	2.11%	30	▼57.1%	0.60%
2006	5,130	2,325	▼14.2%	45.32%	2,660	▲1.1%	51.85%	75	▼34.8%	1.46%	70	▲133.3%	1.36%
2001	5,485	2,710	▼10.7%	49.41%	2,630	▲1.2%	47.95%	115	▼11.5%	2.10%	30	▲200.0%	0.55%
1996	5,775	3,035	n/a	52.55%	2,600	n/a	45.02%	130	n/a	2.25%	10	n/a	0.17%

== See also ==
- List of parishes in New Brunswick
