= HMCS Caraquet =

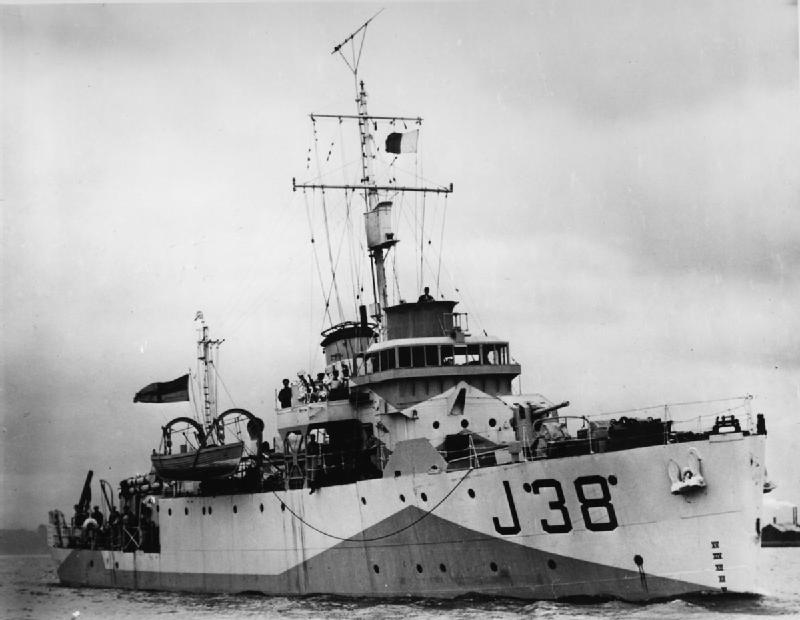
- Caraquet underway

History

United Kingdom
- Name: Caraquet
- Builder: North Vancouver Ship Repairs, North Vancouver
- Laid down: 31 January 1941
- Launched: 2 June 1941
- Identification: pennant J38
- Fate: Loaned to Royal Canadian Navy 1942, sold to Portuguese Navy 1946

Canada
- Name: Caraquet
- Namesake: Caraquet Bay, New Brunswick
- Commissioned: 2 April 1942
- Decommissioned: 26 September 1945
- Fate: returned to Royal Navy 1945

Portugal
- Name: Almirante Lacerda
- Acquired: 29 June 1946
- Identification: A 525
- Fate: Discarded 1975

General characteristics
- Class & type: Bangor-class minesweeper
- Displacement: 672 long tons (683 t)
- Length: 180 ft (54.9 m) oa
- Beam: 28 ft 6 in (8.7 m)
- Draught: 9 ft 9 in (3.0 m)
- Propulsion: 2 Admiralty 3-drum water tube boilers, 2 shafts, vertical triple-expansion reciprocating engines, 2,400 ihp (1,790 kW)
- Speed: 16.5 knots (31 km/h)
- Complement: 83
- Armament: 1 × 12-pounder (3 in (76 mm)) 12 cwt HA gun; 2 × QF 20 mm Oerlikon guns; 40 depth charges as escort

HMCS Caraquet (pennant J38) was a Bangor-class minesweeper initially constructed for the Royal Navy during the Second World War. Transferred to the Royal Canadian Navy in 1942, the vessel served on both coasts of Canada and took part in the Battle of the Atlantic as a convoy escort and the invasion of Normandy. Following the war, the minesweeper was returned to the United Kingdom who then sold the ship to the Portuguese Navy in 1946. Renamed Almirante Lacerda, the vessel was used as a survey ship until 1975 when it was discarded.

== Design and description ==
A British design, the Bangor-class minesweepers were smaller than the preceding Halcyon-class minesweepers in British service, but larger than the Fundy class in Canadian service. They came in two versions powered by different engines; those with a diesel engines and those with vertical triple-expansion steam engines. Caraquet was of the latter design and was larger than her diesel-engined cousins. Caraquet was 180 feet (54.9 m) long overall, had a beam of 28 feet 6 inches (8.7 m) and a draught of 9 feet 9 inches (3.0 m). The minesweeper had a displacement of 672 long tons (683 t). She had a complement of 6 officers and 77 enlisted.

Caraquet had two vertical triple-expansion steam engines, each driving one shaft, using steam provided by two Admiralty three-drum boilers. The engines produced a total of 2,400 indicated horsepower (1,800 kW) and gave a maximum speed of 16.5 knots (30.6 km/h; 19.0 mph). The minesweeper could carry a maximum of 150 long tons (152 t) of fuel oil.

British Bangor-class minesweepers were armed with a single 12-pounder (3 in (76 mm)) 12 cwt HA gun mounted forward. (Note: "Cwt" is the abbreviation for hundredweight, 20 cwt referring to the weight of the gun.) For anti-aircraft purposes, the minesweepers were equipped with one QF 2-pounder Mark VIII and two single-mounted QF 20 mm Oerlikon guns. The 2-pounder gun was later replaced with a twin 20 mm Oerlikon mount. As a convoy escort, Caraquet was deployed with 40 depth charges launched from two depth charge throwers and four chutes.

== Operational history ==
The minesweeper was ordered as part of the British 1940 construction programme. The ship's keel was laid down on 31 January 1941 by North Vancouver Ship Repairs at their yard in North Vancouver, British Columbia. Named for a bay in New Brunswick, Caraquet was launched on 2 June 1941. Transferred to the Royal Canadian Navy, the ship was commissioned on 2 April 1942 at Vancouver.

Following work ups, the minesweeper joined Esquimalt Force in May 1942, the local patrol and convoy escort force operating out of Esquimalt, British Columbia. Caraquet was one of the warships added to the west coast patrol force after the Japanese attack on Pearl Harbor. The main duty of Bangor-class minesweepers after commissioning on the West Coast was to perform the Western Patrol. This consisted of patrolling the west coast of Vancouver Island, inspecting inlets and sounds and past the Scott Islands to Gordon Channel at the entrance to the Queen Charlotte Strait and back. In September, the minesweeper was transferred to Prince Rupert Force, the patrol and escort unit operating out of Prince Rupert, British Columbia and remained with the group until March 1943, when Caraquet was ordered to the Atlantic Coast of Canada.

The minesweeper arrived at Halifax, Nova Scotia on 2 May 1943 and was assigned to the Western Local Escort Force as a convoy escort. Caraquet switched to Halifax Force, the local patrol and escort unit operating from Halifax in June. Beginning in July, the minesweeper began a six-week refit at Baltimore, Maryland in the United States. In December, the vessel transferred again, this time to Newfoundland Force, the escort group operating from St. John's, Newfoundland.

Caraquet worked with Newfoundland Force until February 1944, when the minesweeper was ordered to Europe as part of Canada's contribution to the invasion of Normandy. After arriving at Plymouth on 13 March, the minesweeper was assigned to the all-Canadian 31st Minesweeping Flotilla as Senior Officer's Ship. During the invasion, Caraquet and her fellow minesweepers swept and marked channels through the German minefields leading into the invasion beaches in the American sector. The 31st Minesweeping Flotilla swept channel 3 on 6 June, completing the task unmolested by the Germans. The minesweeper remained in European waters until returning to Canada in September to undergo a refit at Lunenburg, Nova Scotia.

The minesweeper returned to Plymouth in March 1945 and rejoined the 31st Minesweeping Flotilla. Caraquet took part in the last large-scale combined operation in the European theatre in an attack on German naval bases in France that had been left untouched by Allied war effort to that point. Departing Plymouth on 12 April 1945, the 31st Minesweeping Flotilla began operations in the mouth of the Gironde estuary on 14 April. They completed their duties on 16 April, unmolested by the Germans. While returning to Plymouth, the flotilla encountered a German trawler and captured it. Canso and the 31st Minesweeping Flotilla spent the next five months sweeping the English Channel.

Caraquet was paid off and returned to the Royal Navy on 26 September 1945 at Sheerness. Never entering service with the Royal Navy, the vessel was sold to the Portuguese Navy on 29 June 1946 and renamed Almirante Lacerda. Used primarily as a survey vessel, Almirante Lacerda remained in service until 1975. The fate of the vessel is disputed among the sources. Colledge states the vessel was transferred to Mozambique in 1975 and the ship's registry deleted in 1984. The Miramar Ship Index claims the vessel was broken up in 1975.
