= Étienne Jeanneau =

Canadian merchant and court officer

Étienne Jeanneau (also Janot or Geanneau; c. 1668 – 8 May 1743) was a Canadian merchant, court officer and notary, and militia officer.

On 14 June 1709 Jeanneau was granted a commission as a court officer and notary for the large territory encompassing Grande-Anse, Rivière-Ouelle, Kamouraska, Rivière-du-Loup, and Port-Joli. He was the first notary to serve this territory. He served in this role for over thirty years.
