= New Brunswick Route 145 =

Highway in New Brunswick, Canada

Route 145

Route information
- Maintained by New Brunswick Department of Transportation
- Length: 15.93 km (9.90 mi)
- Existed: 1984–present

Major junctions
- East end: Ch. Mysterieux in Pokesudie
- Route 335 in Le Bouthillier
- West end: Route 11 / Route 325 in Bertrand

Location
- Country: Canada
- Province: New Brunswick
- Major cities: Caraquet, Bas-Caraquet

Highway system
- Provincial highways in New Brunswick; Former routes
← Route 144	→ Route 148

Route 145 is a 26.7 km (16.6 mi)-long north–south secondary highway in northeast New Brunswick, Canada.

The routes western terminus is at Route 325 in Bertrand. From there, it runs east along Caraquet Bay and Chaleur Bay through the town of Caraquet following the previous alignment of Route 11 before crossing onto Pokesudie Island.

== History ==
Route 145 was commissioned in 1984 as a renumbering of the former Route 330, which had existed since 1965. October 2016 the route was extended continuing where the former Route 11 used to be.

== Communities ==
- Pointe a Marcelle
- Bertrand
- Caraquet
- Bas-Caraquet
- Pokesudie

== See also ==
- List of New Brunswick provincial highways
