= Janeville =

- Location within New Brunswick
- Coordinates: 47°41′28.3″N 65°26′50.8″W
- Country: Canada
- Province: New Brunswick
- County: Gloucester

Janeville is a community in Gloucester County, New Brunswick on the Chaleur Bay. The Community is located at the Intersection of Route 11 and Route 340. It straddles the boundary between Bathurst and New Bandon Parishes and is part of the local service district of New Bandon-Salmon Beach.

== History ==
The community was named after Jane Dawson, one of the first arrivals to the area. The community primarily depended on agriculture and fishing, and was at one point served by the Caraquet and Gulf Shore Railway.

== See also ==
- List of communities in New Brunswick
