= New Brunswick Route 330 =

Highway in New Brunswick, Canada

Route 330

Route information
- Maintained by New Brunswick Department of Transportation
- Length: 9.76 km (6.06 mi)

Major junctions
- North end: Route 11 in Grande-Anse
- South end: Route 135 in Black Rock

Location
- Country: Canada
- Province: New Brunswick
- Major cities: Saint-Leolin

Highway system
- Provincial highways in New Brunswick; Former routes
← Route 325	→ Route 335

Route 330 is a 10-kilometre (6.2 mi) long, north–south secondary highway in the southwest portion of New Brunswick, Canada.

The route's west terminus is in the community of Black Rock. The road travels north-east to the community of Saint-Leolin, where it is known as Boulevard Saint-Joseph. From there, the road continues north to Village-Saint Paul. It ends in Grande-Anse as Avenue du Portage. It neither intersects with other routes nor crosses any major rivers.

== See also ==
- List of New Brunswick provincial highways
