= Normunds =

Male given name

- Gender: Male
- Name day: 2 August

Origin
- Region of origin: Latvia

Other names
- Related names: Norman

Normunds is a Latvian masculine given name. Notable people with the given name include:

- Normunds Aplociņš (born 1969), Latvian skier
- Normunds Lasis (born 1985), Latvian cyclist
- Normunds Miezis (born 1971), Latvian chess Grandmaster
- Normunds Pūpols (born 1984), Latvian high jumper
- Normunds Sējējs (born 1968), Latvian ice hockey player and coach
- Normunds Sietiņš (born 1967), Latvian high jumper

== See also ==
- Normand
