= Maisonnette, New Brunswick =

Maisonnette
- Location within New Brunswick
- Coordinates: 47°49′33.5″N 65°1′11.9″W
- Country: Canada
- Province: New Brunswick
- Village: Gloucester County
- Town: Rivière-du-Nord
- Incorporation: May 12, 1986

Area
  - Land: 12.91 km^{2} (4.98 sq mi)

Population (2021)
  - Total: 535
  - Density: 41.4/km^{2} (107/sq mi)
  - Change (2016–21): ▲8.1%
- Time zone: Atlantic (AST)
  - Summer (DST): Atlantic (ADT)
- Area code: 506

Maisonnette is a former village in Gloucester County, New Brunswick, Canada. It held village status prior to 2023 but is now part of the town of Rivière-du-Nord.

The fishing village is located on the north shore of Caraquet Harbour near Pointe de Maisonnette, opposite the town of Caraquet on the Acadian Peninsula.

== History ==
The village was first settled in 1832 as a temporary fishing port for people from Caraquet and Bertrand. Their small cabins (maisonnettes in French) was the inspiration for the name of the village.

Maisonnette is French for "little house". Formerly Ste. Jeanne D'Arc, the name was changed on October 1, 1936.

On 1 January 2023, Maisonnette amalgamated with three other villages and all or part of four local service districts to form the new town of Rivière-du-Nord. The community's name remains in official use.

== Demographics ==
In the 2021 Census of Population conducted by Statistics Canada, Maisonnette had a population of 535 living in 294 of its 401 total private dwellings, a change of 8.1% from its 2016 population of 495. With a land area of 12.91 km^{2} (4.98 sq mi), it had a population density of 41.4/km^{2} (107.3/sq mi) in 2021.

== See also ==
- List of communities in New Brunswick
