= New Brunswick Route 135 =

Highway in New Brunswick, Canada

Route 135

Route information
- Maintained by New Brunswick Department of Transportation
- Length: 32.0 km (19.9 mi)
- Existed: 1965–present

Major junctions
- South end: Route 160 in Hautes-Terres
- Route 363 in Hacheyville; Route 355 in Bois-Blanc; Route 350 in Rang-Saint-Georges; Route 340 in Paquetville; Route 325 in Trudel; Route 330 in Black Rock
- North end: Route 11 in Pokeshaw

Location
- Country: Canada
- Province: New Brunswick
- Counties: Gloucester
- Major cities: Hautes-Terres

Highway system
- Provincial highways in New Brunswick; Former routes
← Route 134	→ Route 140

Route 135 is a New Brunswick provincial collector road that runs 32 kilometres (20 mi) between Hautes-Terres and Pokeshaw.

== Communities ==
- Hautes-Terres
- Hacheyville
- Duguayville
- Bois-Blanc
- Trudel
- Burnsville
- Black Rock
- Pokeshaw

== See also ==
- List of New Brunswick provincial highways
