= North Tetagouche, New Brunswick =

North Tetagouche Tétagouche-Nord (French)
- Location within New Brunswick
- Coordinates: 47.6383°N 65.7511°W
- Country: Canada
- Province: New Brunswick
- County: Gloucester
- Local government: Local service district

Government
  - MLA: Ryan Riordon

Area
  - Total: 22.49 km^{2} (8.68 sq mi)

Population (2006)
  - Total: 955
  - Density: 42.5/km^{2} (110/sq mi)
- Time zone: UTC-4 (AST)
  - Summer (DST): UTC-3 (ADT)

North Tetagouche (Tétagouche-Nord in French) is a local service district in New Brunswick, Canada. It is situated 7 km Western the centre of Bathurst. It is located to the North of Tetagouche river, it is nearly rectangular and borders Dunlop on the Northwest. The most part of its territory is a forest and a residential neighbourhood by the river which links to Route 322.

== Demographics ==
In the 2021 Census of Population conducted by Statistics Canada, North Tetagouche had a population of 908 living in 362 of its 367 total private dwellings, a change of −3.9% from its 2016 population of 945. With a land area of 22.42 km^{2} (8.66 sq mi), it had a population density of 40.5/km^{2} (104.9/sq mi) in 2021.

== Government ==
Within the Local service district, North Tetagouche is administered by the Department of Local Government (New Brunswick), assisted by and advisory committee of five members with a president.

The Nepisiguit electoral district is represented at the Legislative Assembly of New Brunswick by Cheryl Lavoie, a member of New Brunswick Liberal Association.

== See also ==
- List of communities in New Brunswick
