= Pokeshaw, New Brunswick =

Coordinates: 47°47′10″N 65°15′31″W

- Interactive map of Pokeshaw, New Brunswick

Pokeshaw Island rock formation

Pokeshaw is an unincorporated village in Gloucester County (New Bandon Parish), New Brunswick, Canada. It houses a former provincial, now communal park that includes a beach, and a large rock stack, Pokeshaw Island, also known as Pokeshaw Rock, which serves as a nesting ground for hundreds of seabirds who can be seen on the top.

There are three main industries in Pokeshaw: fishing, farming, and maple products. There are several farms in the area: Riordon's dairy farm, the Canwick cranberry farm, and maple sugar camps. The area hosts an annual festival dedicated to cranberry farming. The number of tourists visiting the area has significantly increased since a boardwalk was installed giving views over the cliffs in 2019.

Pokeshaw and its surrounding areas are fertile with moose, bear, deer and rabbit as well as abundant fish stocks. Fresh water springs and dense forests make for attractive outdoors activities such as hiking, fishing and hunting. The nearest village is Grande Anse and the larger towns are Bathurst and Caraquet.

== History ==
The name "Pokeshaw" is reportedly of indigenous origin, with meanings claimed including "narrows" and "meeting place". It was permanently settled by Irish immigrants from 1820 onwards.

Pokeshaw was settled by Irish families in the early 1800s and remained until the 1960s. Today some common names in the community include Riordon, Coombs, Whelton, and more.

== See also ==
- List of communities in New Brunswick
