= Big River, New Brunswick =

Coordinates: 47.578379°N 65.665369°W

Location of Big River in New Brunswick

Big River is a Canadian rural community in Gloucester County, New Brunswick. It is the northernmost community in the local service district of Big River, which had a population of 721 inhabitants in 2016.

== Demographics ==
In the 2021 Census of Population conducted by Statistics Canada, Big River had a population of 791 living in 349 of its 372 total private dwellings, a change of 9.7% from its 2016 population of 721. With a land area of 21.72 km^{2} (8.39 sq mi), it had a population density of 36.4/km^{2} (94.3/sq mi) in 2021.

== See also ==
- List of communities in New Brunswick
