= Norman, Missouri =

Extinct hamlet in Missouri, U.S.

Coordinates: 37°50′37″N 91°35′28″W

Norman is an extinct town in southeastern Phelps County, in the U.S. state of Missouri.

A post office called Norman was established in 1888, and remained in operation until 1926. The community has the name of a local family.
