= Dugas, New Brunswick =

Coordinates: 47.804778°N 65.113278°W

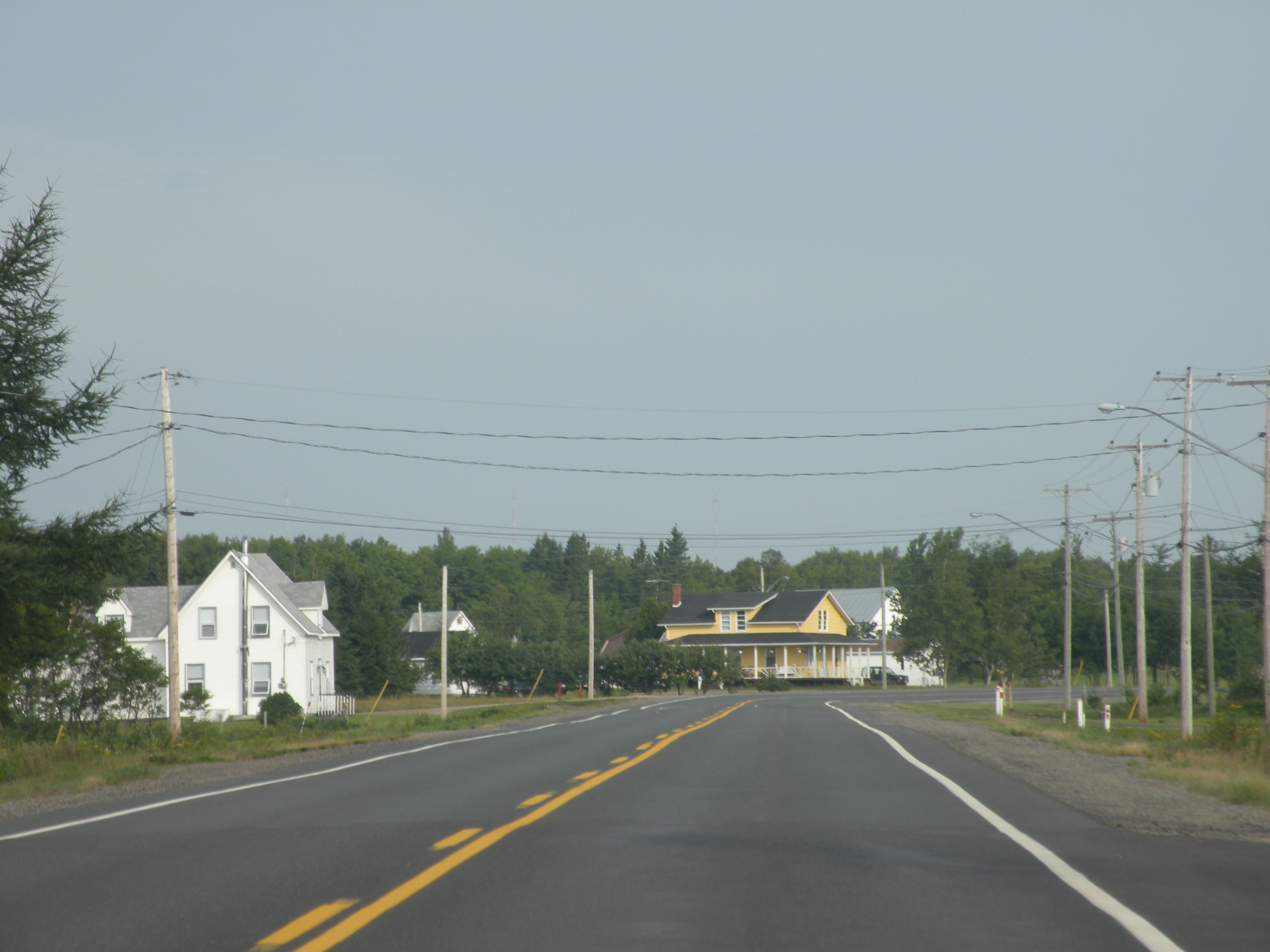
View of Dugas on Route 11

Location of Dugas in New Brunswick

Dugas is a Canadian community and former local service district in Gloucester County, New Brunswick. Marcel Dugas was the first postmaster here and the community was likely named after him. A post office was here from 1907 to 1953.

== Demographics ==
In the 2021 Census of Population conducted by Statistics Canada, Dugas had a population of 67 living in 36 of its 38 total private dwellings, a change of 0% from its 2016 population of 67. With a land area of 4.57 km^{2} (1.76 sq mi), it had a population density of 14.7/km^{2} (38.0/sq mi) in 2021.

== See also ==
- List of communities in New Brunswick
