= Middle Landing, New Brunswick =

Community in New Brunswick, Canada

Coordinates: 47.441731°N 65.708199°W

Location of Middle Landing in New Brunswick

Middle Landing is a rural community in the Canadian province of New Brunswick, located in Gloucester County. The community is Located mainly on Route 360 on the Nepisiguit River.

== See also ==
- List of communities in New Brunswick
