= Dunlop, New Brunswick =

Coordinates: 47.681194°N 65.731194°W

Location of Dunlop in New Brunswick

Dunlop is a Canadian rural community and former local service district (LSD) in Gloucester County, New Brunswick. Most of the LSD was in Beresford Parish, with the southern extremity in Bathurst Parish.

== History ==
Initially settled around 1841, in 1898 the settlement had a population of around 200.

== Demographics ==
In the 2021 Census of Population conducted by Statistics Canada, Dunlop had a population of 930 living in 394 of its 407 total private dwellings, a change of -2.1% from its 2016 population of 950. With a land area of 18.29 km^{2} (7.06 sq mi), it had a population density of 50.8/km^{2} (131.7/sq mi) in 2021.

== See also ==
- List of communities in New Brunswick
