= Normand =

Normand is the French name for the Norman language and people from Normandy.

It is also a surname and masculine given name. "Normand" = The French surname describes those families in and originating from Normandy. The "d" was retained by immigrates that settled in North America.

"Norman" = of French origin but refers to the linage that conquered England in the year 1066. After the Battle of Hastings. Refer to: William the Conquer Both versions of this surname occur throughout Canada & the United States of America. It may refer to:

== Given name ==
- Normand Aubin (born 1960), Canadian hockey player
- Normand Baker (1908–1955), Australian artist
- Normand Baron (born 1957), Canadian hockey player
- Normand Brathwaite (born 1958), Canadian comedian, actor, radio and television host, and musician
- Normand Corbeil (1956–2013), Canadian film, television, and video game composer
- Normand D'Amour (born 1962), Canadian actor
- Normand Duguay (born 1941), Canadian politician
- Norm Dupont (born 1957), Canadian hockey player
- Normand Jutras (born 1948), Canadian lawyer and politician
- Normand Lacombe (born 1964), Canadian hockey player
- Norm LaPointe (born 1955), Canadian hockey goaltender
- Normand Lapointe (born 1939), Canadian politician
- Normand Laprise (born 1961), Canadian chef and author
- Normand Lester (born 1945), Canadian investigative journalist
- Normand Léveillé (born 1963), Canadian hockey player
- Normand Lockwood (1906–2002), American composer
- Normand MacLaurin (1835–1914), Scottish-born physician, company director, Australian politician, and university administrator
- Normand Smith Patton (1852–1915), American architect
- Normand Poirier (1928–1981), American journalist, essayist, and newspaper editor
- Normand Rochefort (born 1961), Canadian hockey player
- Normand Roger (born 1949), Canadian composer, sound editor, and sound designer
- Normand Shay (1899–1968), Canadian hockey player
- Normand Toupin (born 1933), Canadian politician

== Surname ==
- Charles Normand (1889–1982), Scottish meteorologist
- Ernest Normand (1859–1923), English painter
- Gilbert Normand (1943–2025), Canadian physician and politician
- Jacques Normand (1848–1931), French poet, playwright, and writer
- Jean Normand (1927–2020), British paediatrician, known professionally as Jean Smellie
- Kirstin Normand (born 1974), Canadian synchronized swimmer
- Louis-Philippe Normand (1863–1928), Canadian physician and politician
- Mabel Normand (1892–1930), American silent film actor, screenwriter, director, and producer
- Mark Normand (born 1983), American stand-up comedian and actor
- Sharon-Lise Normand, Canadian biostatistician
- Signe Normand (born 1979), Danish biologist and educator
- Télesphore-Eusèbe Normand (1832–1918), Canadian politician
- Wilfrid Normand, Baron Normand (1884–1962), Scottish politician and judge

== See also ==
- Le Normand-class frigate, a French Navy class from the 1950s on
- Franck Le Normand (1931–2025), French cyclist in the 1952 Olympics
- Norman (disambiguation)
- Normunds, given name
