= Grande-Anse, New Brunswick =

Grande-Anse
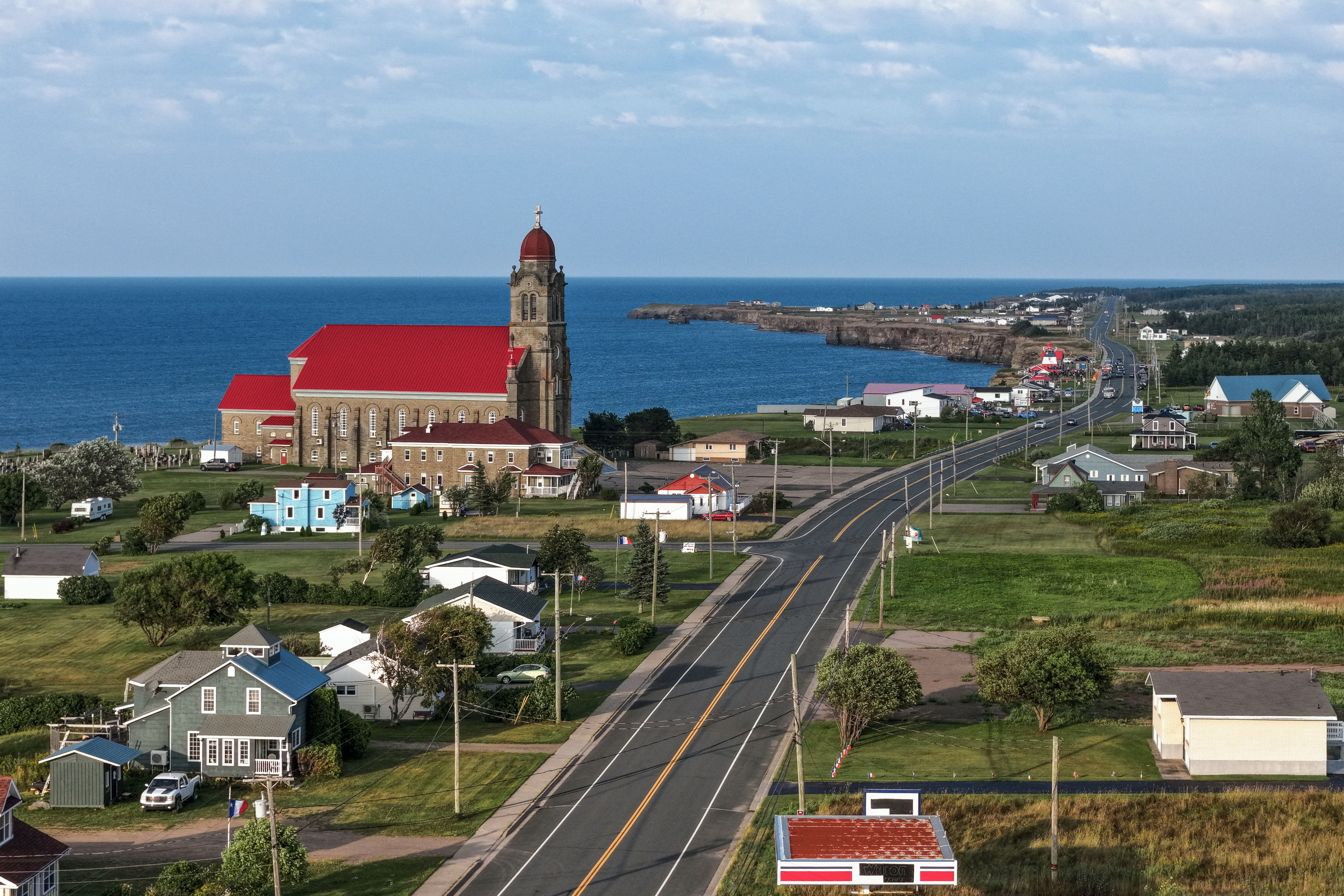
- The village of Grande-Anse, on Chaleur Bay.

- Location within New Brunswick
- Coordinates: 47°48′44″N 65°11′07″W
- Country: Canada
- Province: New Brunswick
- County: Gloucester
- Town: Rivière-du-Nord
- Founded: 1808
- Incorporated: 1968
- Electoral Districts Federal: Acadie—Bathurst
- Provincial: Caraquet

Government
  - MLA: Isabelle Thériault (Lib.)
  - MP: Serge Cormier (Liberal)

Area
  - Land: 24.27 km^{2} (9.37 sq mi)

Population (2021)
  - Total: 731
  - Density: 30.1/km^{2} (78/sq mi)
  - Change (2016–21): ▼18.7%
- Time zone: UTC-4 (EST)
  - Summer (DST): UTC-3 (EDT)
- Area code: +1-506-732
- Website: Grande-Anse

Grande-Anse (French pronunciation: [ɡʁɑ̃dɑ̃s] or French pronunciation: [ɡʁɑ̃tɑ̃s]) is a former village in Gloucester County, New Brunswick, Canada. It held village status prior to 2023 and is now part of the town of Rivière-du-Nord.

The community is near the community of Pokeshaw on the shore of Chaleur Bay in the Acadian Peninsula region, 25 km northwest of Caraquet and 45 kilometres east of Bathurst.

Grande-Anse's tourist attractions include the Grande-Anse beach, and the Founding Cultures Museum.

== History ==
The village was first settled by Acadian Simon Landry in 1808, and was incorporated in 1968.

On 1 January 2023, Grande-Anse amalgamated with Bertrand, Maisonnette, Saint-Léolin, and all or part of four local service districts to form the new town of Rivière-du-Nord. The community's name remains in official use.

== Demographics ==
In the 2021 Census of Population conducted by Statistics Canada, Grande-Anse had a population of 731 living in 361 of its 412 total private dwellings, a change of −18.7% from its 2016 population of 899. With a land area of 24.27 km^{2} (9.37 sq mi), it had a population density of 30.1/km^{2} (78.0/sq mi) in 2021.

== Geography ==
There is a small, man-made harbor with fishing boats. Grande Anse has a stone church building, called Saint Jude. The church spire has been a landmark for sailors.

== Museum ==
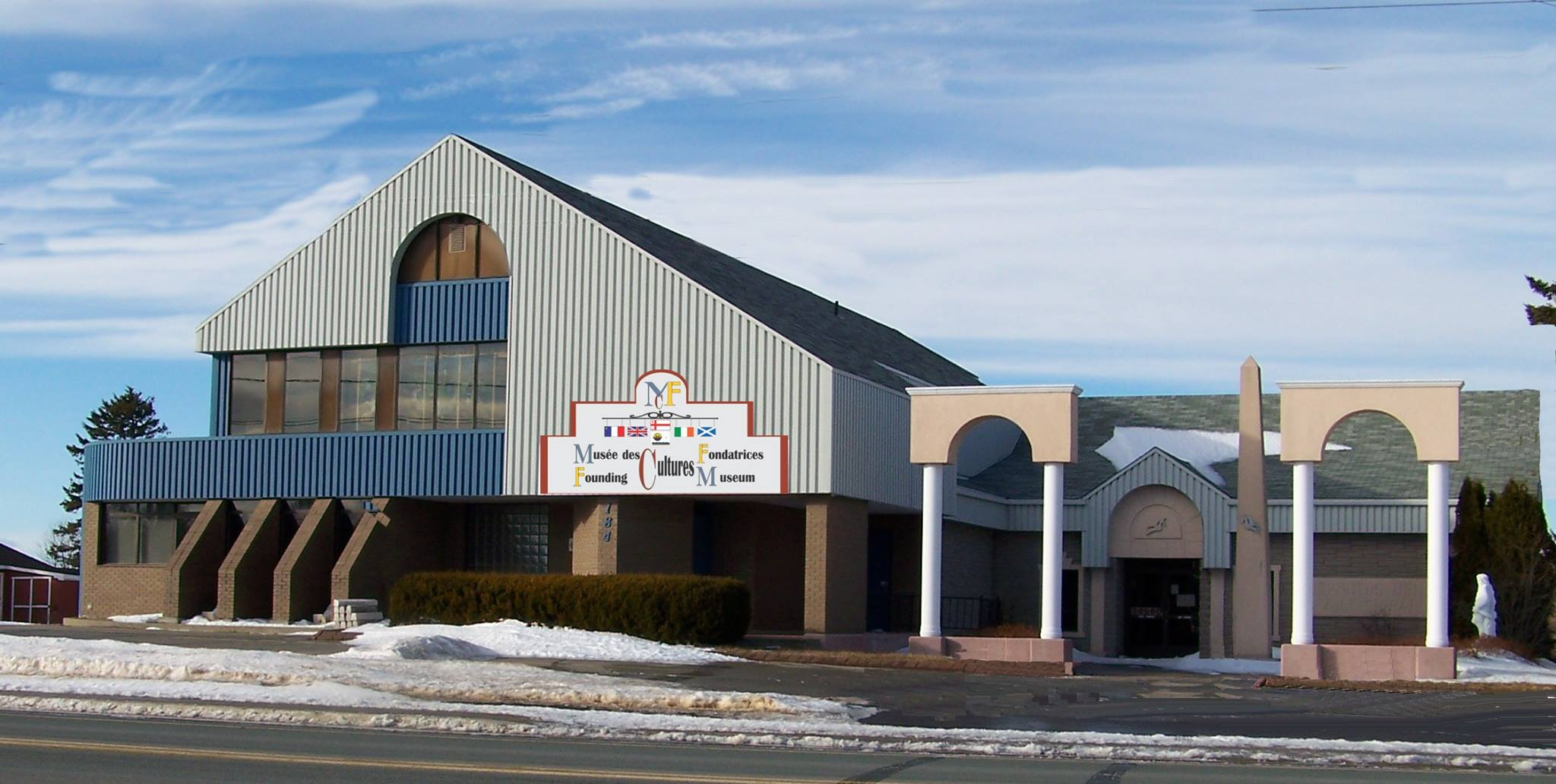
The museum in 2022

After a 1984 visit from Pope John Paul II to Moncton, New Brunswick, the Pope Museum (French: Le Musée des Papes) was created in Grande Anse. It contained portraits of all the popes, a scale model of the Vatican, and other items. With attendance falling from 30,000 visitors per year in its early days to just 500 in 2015, it was re-imagined as the Founding Cultures Museum (Musée des cultures fondatrices), a museum about the people who have lived in the Grande Anse area, including the First Nations as well as the Acadian, Irish, Scottish, and British immigrants.

== See also ==
- List of communities in New Brunswick
