= New Brunswick Route 340 =

Highway in New Brunswick, Canada

Route 340

Route information
- Maintained by New Brunswick Department of Transportation
- Length: 30 km (19 mi)

Major junctions
- East end: Route 11 in Janeville
- West end: Route 135 in Hautes-Terres

Location
- Country: Canada
- Province: New Brunswick
- Major cities: Canobie, Canobie South, Rocheville, Notre-Dame-des-Erables, Haut-Paquetville

Highway system
- Provincial highways in New Brunswick; Former routes
← Route 335	→ Route 345

Route 340 is a 30-kilometre (19 mi) long, mainly east/west secondary highway in the north-eastern portion of New Brunswick, Canada.

The route's western terminus is in the community of Janeville. The road travels south-east to the community of Canobie. Passing the community, the highway takes a 90 degree turn south passing the community of Canobie South. The highway takes a 45 degree turn and travels to the community of Rocheville before taking another turn south then another turn east going towards Notre-Dame-des-Erables, Haut-Paquetville, and eventually Hautes-Terres. There are no river crossings or intersecting routes.

== See also ==
- List of New Brunswick provincial highways
