= Saint-Léolin, New Brunswick =

Saint-Léolin
- Location of Saint-Léolin, New Brunswick
- Coordinates: 47°46′3.0″N 65°09′1.6″W
- Country: Canada
- Province: New Brunswick
- County: Gloucester County
- Parish: New Bandon Parish
- Town: Rivière-du-Nord

Area
  - Land: 19.73 km^{2} (7.62 sq mi)

Population (2021)
  - Total: 615
  - Density: 31.2/km^{2} (81/sq mi)
  - Change 2016–21: ▼4.9%
- Time zone: UTC-4 (Atlantic)
  - Summer (DST): UTC-3 (Atlantic)
- Area code: Area code 506
- Website: http://www.villagesaintleolin.ca

Saint-Léolin (French pronunciation: [sɛ̃ leɔlɛ̃]) is a former village on the Acadian Peninsula in Gloucester County, New Brunswick, Canada. It held village status prior to 2023 and is now part of the town of Rivière-du-Nord.

== History ==
The first settler in the village was Joseph Bertin in the early 19th century. The village was originally named Saint-Joseph, but changed in 1904 to avoid confusion with another Saint-Joseph near Memramcook.

The village was incorporated in 1978.

On 1 January 2023, Saint-Léolin amalgamated with the three other villages and all or part of four local service districts to form the new of Rivière-du-Nord. The community's name remains in official use.

== Demographics ==
In the 2021 Census of Population conducted by Statistics Canada, Saint-Léolin had a population of 615 living in 305 of its 330 total private dwellings, a change of −4.9% from its 2016 population of 647. With a land area of 19.73 km^{2} (7.62 sq mi), it had a population density of 31.2/km^{2} (80.7/sq mi) in 2021.

== See also ==
- List of communities in New Brunswick
