= Rivière du Nord (New Brunswick) =

River in New Brunswick, Canada

Coordinates: 47°47′0″N 65°5′0″W

The Rivière du Nord (French pronunciation: [ʁivjɛʁ dy nɔʁ]) is a river that flows into the Caraquet Bay west of Caraquet, New Brunswick, Canada.

== See also ==
- List of rivers of New Brunswick
