= Caraquet River =

River in New Brunswick, Canada

Coordinates: 47.733493°N 65.115623°W

The Caraquet River is a river in north-eastern New Brunswick, Canada which empties into the Caraquet Bay north of Caraquet.

The river's name means "meeting of two rivers" in the Mi'kmaq language.

== River Communities ==
- Bertrand
- Burnsville

== River Crossings ==
- Route 11
- Route 135
- Route 340

== See also ==
- List of rivers of New Brunswick
