= Burnsville, New Brunswick =

Coordinates: 47.7°N 65.167°W

Location of Burnsville in New Brunswick

Burnsville is a community in the Canadian province of New Brunswick. It is situated in Paquetville, a parish of Gloucester County.

== History ==
When settled in 1874, the community initially took the name of Milltown. The community's current name is derived from that of Kennedy Francis Burns, a Canadian politician and President of the Caraquet and Gulf Shore Railway, the same company that built a railroad through Burnsville.

== See also ==
- List of communities in New Brunswick
- List of people from Gloucester County, New Brunswick
