= New Bandon-Salmon Beach =

Coordinates: 47.666°N 65.536°W

Location of the Parish of New Bandon-Salmon Beach in New Brunswick

New Bandon-Salmon Beach was a local service district in New Brunswick, Canada. It was merged into the Chaleur Rural District on 1 January 2023, with a small area now part of the city of Bathurst.

New Bandon was named after the town of Bandon in Ireland. It was located 12 km (7.5 mi) east of the city of Bathurst, New Brunswick on Nepisiguit Bay.

== History ==
New Bandon-Salmon Beach was located on the historical territory of the Mi'kmaq people. The seigneurie of Nepisiguit, containing the area that would become New Bandon-Salmon Beach, was ceded to France on 19 March 1691. The community of New Bandon was founded in 1819 by 70 Protestant families from Bandon, County Cork in Ireland. New Bandon was touched by the 1825 Miramichi fire, which consumed approximately 16,000 km^{2} (6,200 mi^{2}) of forest in northeastern New Brunswick. Salmon Beach was also founded by Irish immigrants between 1820 and 1830. The parish of New Bandon was established in 1831.

== Demographics ==
In the 2021 Census of Population conducted by Statistics Canada, New Bandon-Salmon Beach had a population of 832 living in 393 of its 512 total private dwellings, a change of 2.3% from its 2016 population of 813. With a land area of 345.8 km^{2} (133.5 sq mi), it had a population density of 2.4/km^{2} (6.2/sq mi) in 2021.

Population of New Bandon-Salmon Beach
Name	Parish	Population (2021)	Population (2016)	Change	Land area (km^{2})	Population density
New Bandon-Salmon Beach part A	New Bandon	487	459	+6.1%	191.66	2.5/km^{2}
New Bandon-Salmon Beach part B	Bathurst	345	354	−2.5%	154.14	2.2/km^{2}
Total	—	832	813	+2.3%	345.8	2.4/km^{2}

== See also ==
- List of local service districts in New Brunswick
