= Hautes-Terres =

- Town
- Municipalité des Hautes-Terres
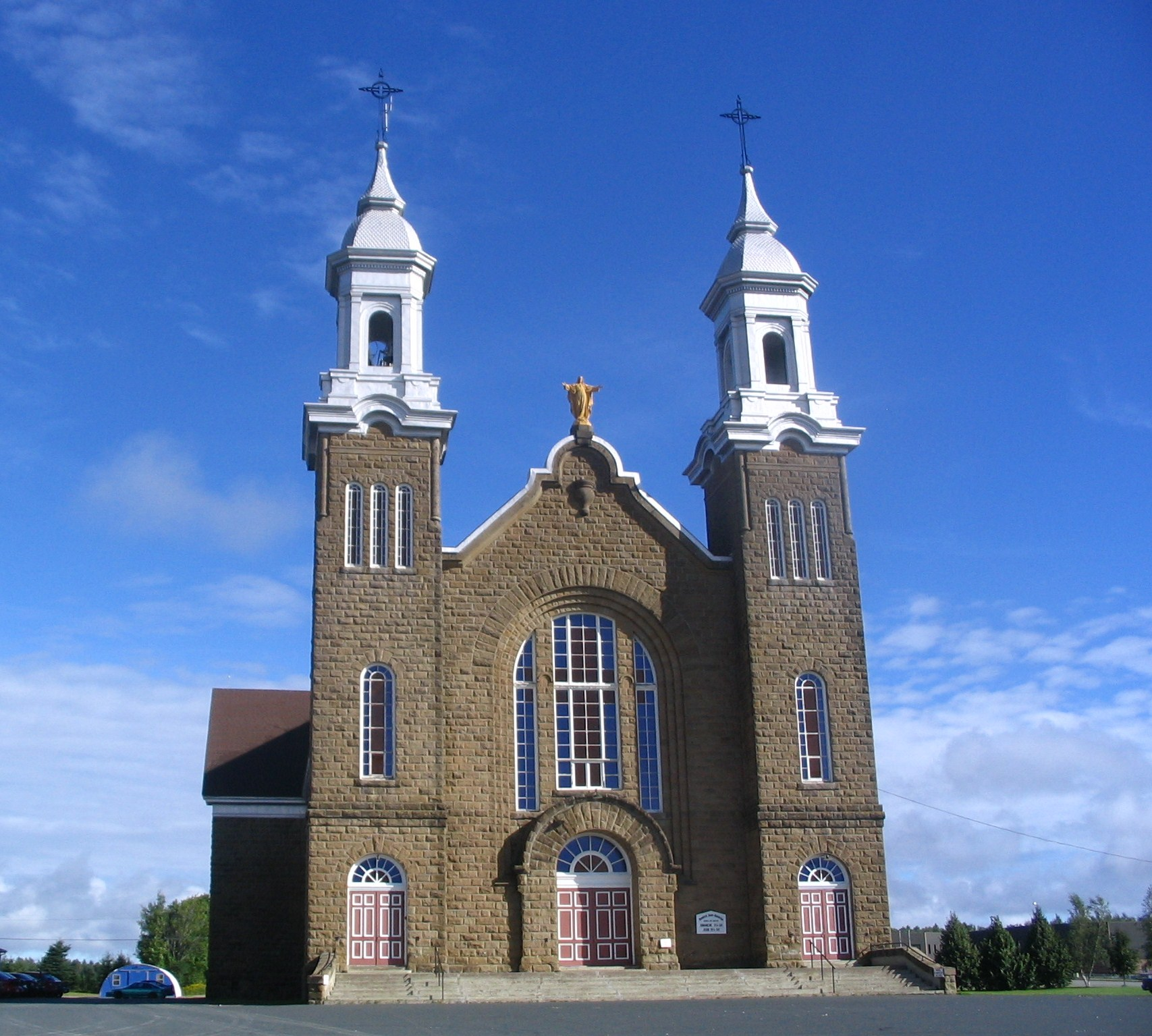

- Location within New Brunswick
- Coordinates: 47°40′08″N 65°05′57″W
- Country: Canada
- Province: New Brunswick
- County: Gloucester
- Regional service commission: Acadian Peninsula
- Incorporated: January 1, 2023
- Electoral Districts Federal: Acadie—Bathurst
- Provincial: Caraquet

Government
  - Type: Town council
  - Mayor: Cathy Paulin
- Time zone: UTC-4 (AST)
  - Summer (DST): UTC-3 (ADT)
- Postal code(s): E8M, E8R
- Area code: 506
- Highways Route 135 Route 160: Route 340; Route 350; Route 365

Hautes-Terres (French pronunciation: [ot tɛʁ], lit. 'Highlands') is a town in the Canadian province of New Brunswick. It was formed through the 2023 New Brunswick local governance reforms.

== History ==
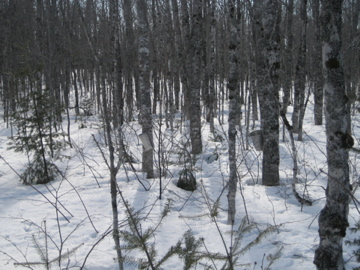
Maple Trees in Hautes-Terres during the Maple harvesting season

Hautes-Terres was incorporated on January 1, 2023, via the amalgamation of the former villages of Saint-Isidore and Paquetville as well as the concurrent annexation of adjacent unincorporated areas.

== Notable people ==
- Édith Butler, who sings the song Paquetville

== See also ==
- List of communities in New Brunswick
- List of municipalities in New Brunswick
