= Bertrand, New Brunswick =

Bertrand
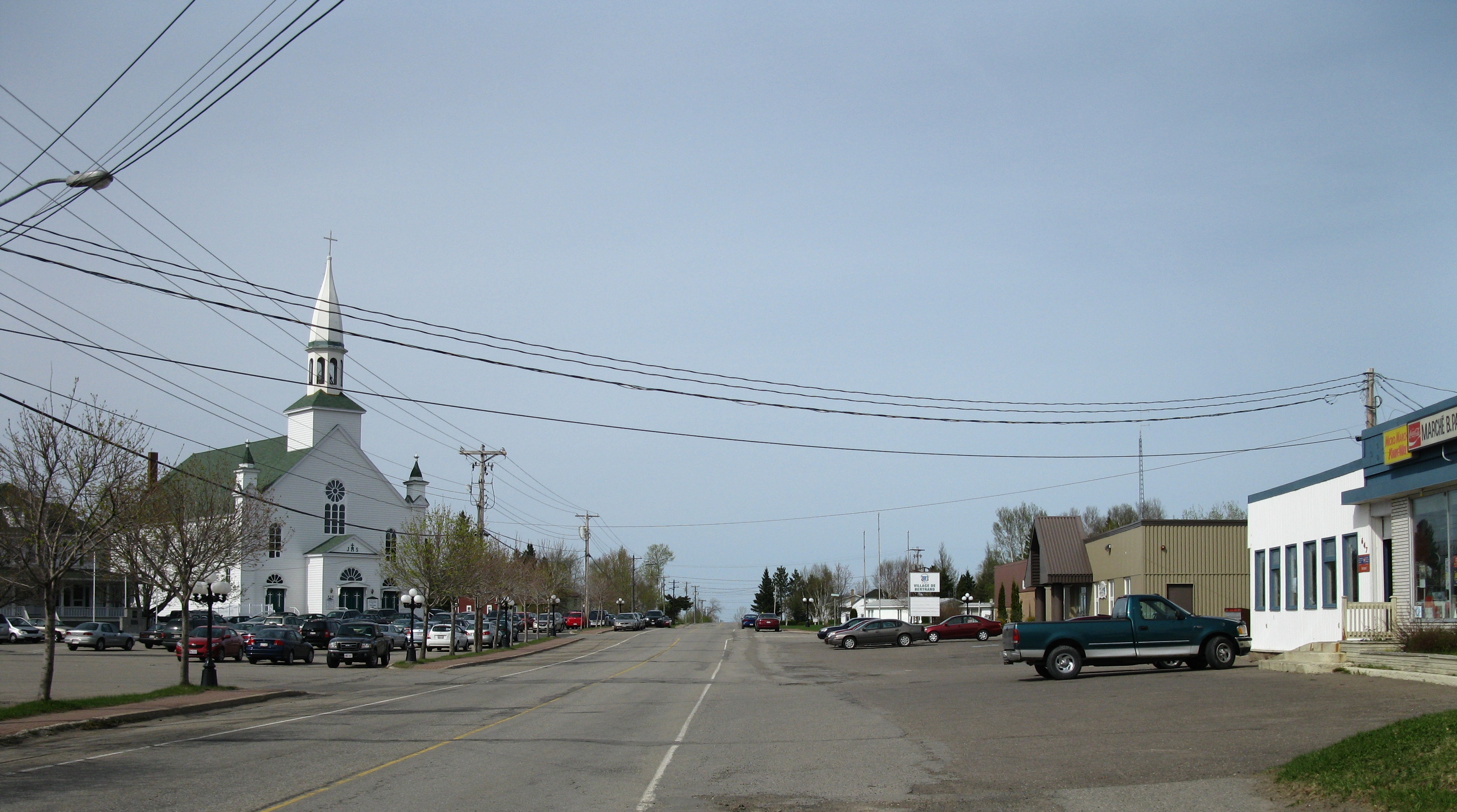

- Location within New Brunswick
- Coordinates: 47°45′N 65°04′W
- Country: Canada
- Province: New Brunswick
- County: Gloucester
- Parish: Caraquet
- Town: Rivière-du-Nord
- Founded: 1786
- Incorporated: 1968
- Amalgamated: 1 January 2023

Area
  - Total: 57.01 km^{2} (22.01 sq mi)

Population (2021)
  - Total: 1,153
  - Density: 20.2/km^{2} (52/sq mi)
  - Pop 2016-2021: ▼1.1%
  - Dwellings: 665
- Time zone: UTC-4 (AST)
  - Summer (DST): UTC-3 (ADT)
- Postal code(s): E1W
- Area code: 506
- Highways Route 11: Route 325
- Website: www.village debertrand.ca/node

Bertrand (French pronunciation: [bɛʁtʁɑ̃]) is a former village in Gloucester County, New Brunswick, Canada. It held village status prior to 2023 and is now part of the town of Rivière-du-Nord.

== History ==
On 1 January 2023, Bertrand amalgamated with three villages and all or part of four local service districts to form the new town of Rivière-du-Nord. The community's name remains in official use.

== Geography ==
The community is located on the Acadian Peninsula at the mouth of the Caraquet River where it empties into Caraquet Bay, roughly 10 km west of Caraquet. The community centres around the intersection of Route 11, Route 145 and Route 325.

== Demographics ==
In the 2021 Census of Population conducted by Statistics Canada, Bertrand had a population of 1,153 living in 581 of its 665 total private dwellings, a change of −1.1% from its 2016 population of 1,166. With a land area of 57.01 km^{2} (22.01 sq mi), it had a population density of 20.2/km^{2} (52.4/sq mi) in 2021.

== See also ==
- List of communities in New Brunswick
