= Caraquet Bay =

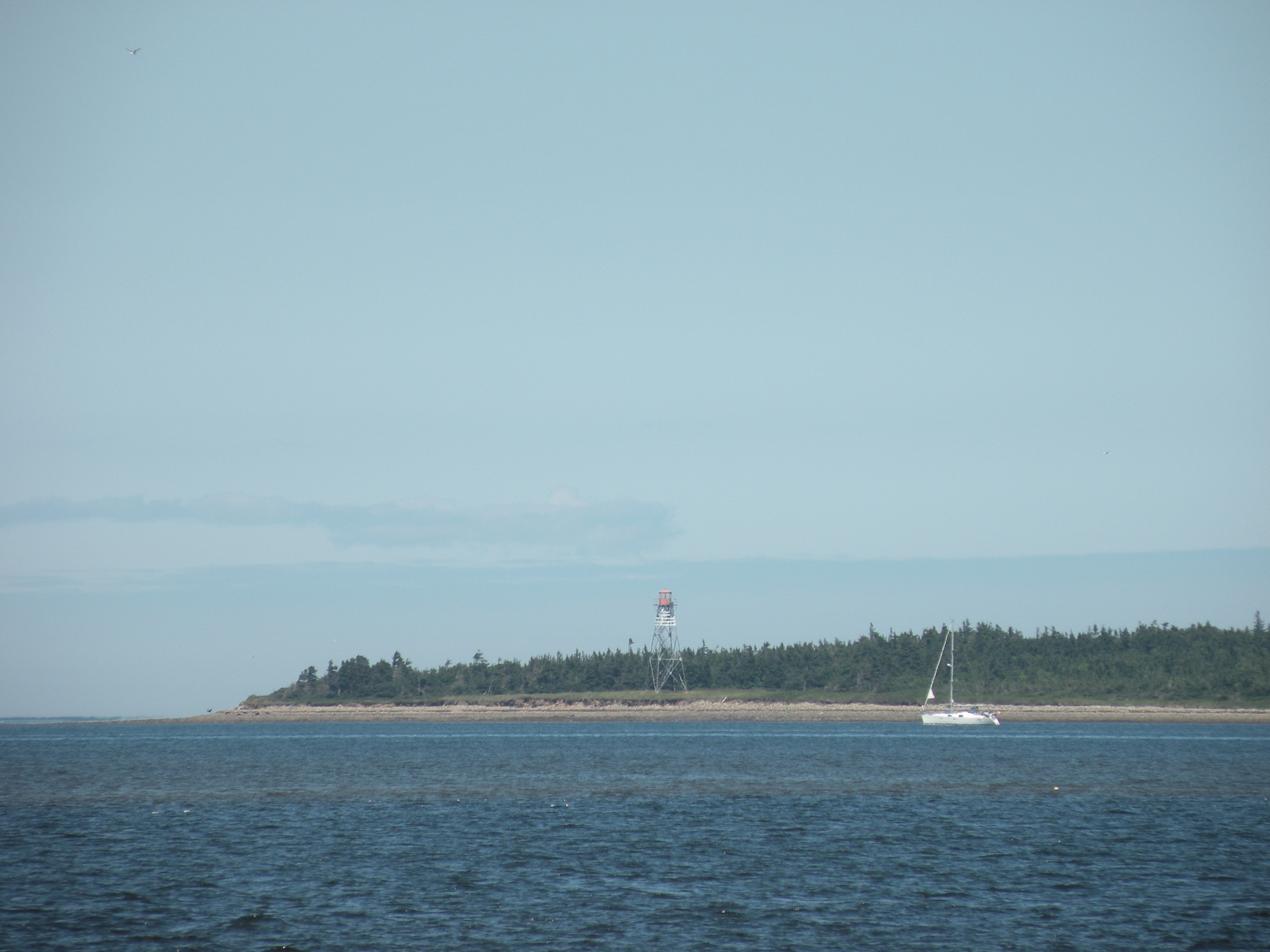
- Caraquet Island Lighthouse seen across Caraquet Bay

- Location within New Brunswick
- Coordinates: 47.7977°N 65.0004°W
- Type: Bay
- Part of: Gulf of Saint Lawrence
- Basin countries: Canada

Caraquet Bay (French: Baie de Caraquet) is situated in the northeast of the Canadian province of New Brunswick. It is bordered on the south by the town of Caraquet and the village of Bertrand, to the south by the parish of New Bandon, to the north by the village of Maisonnette and to the northwest by the Baie des Chaleurs. Caraquet Island is located between the two bays. There are a number of beaches on the bay, as well as oyster farms and the port of Caraquet. Caraquet Bay flows into the Caraquet River and the Du Nord River

There are two theories about the origin of the bay's name. Either Caraquet is a word in the Mi'kmaq language meaning "where two rivers meet", or it comes from a type of ship, the carrack. Governor Nicolas Denys was the first to mention Caraquet, in 1672.

== See also ==
- List of lighthouses in New Brunswick
