= Caraquet =

- Town
- Aerial view of Caraquet in 2026

- Coat of arms
- Motto: Cultural Capital of Acadia
- Location within New Brunswick
- Coordinates: 47.79400°N 64.93855°W
- Country: Canada
- Province: New Brunswick
- County: Gloucester County
- Parish: Caraquet
- Founded: 1731
- Incorporated: November 15, 1961

Government
  - Type: Town Council
  - Mayor: Bernard Thériault

Area
  - Land: 68.13 km^{2} (26.31 sq mi)
- Highest elevation: 31 m (102 ft)
- Lowest elevation: 0 m (0 ft)

Population (2021)
  - Total: 4,285
  - Density: 62.9/km^{2} (163/sq mi)
  - Pop 2016–21: ▲0.9%
  - Dwellings: 2,150
- Time zone: UTC-4 (AST)
  - Summer (DST): UTC-3 (ADT)
- Postal code(s): E1W
- Area code: 506
- Highways Route 11: Route 145; Route 325; Route 335
- Website: www.caraquet.ca
- Caraquet Range Front Lighthouse
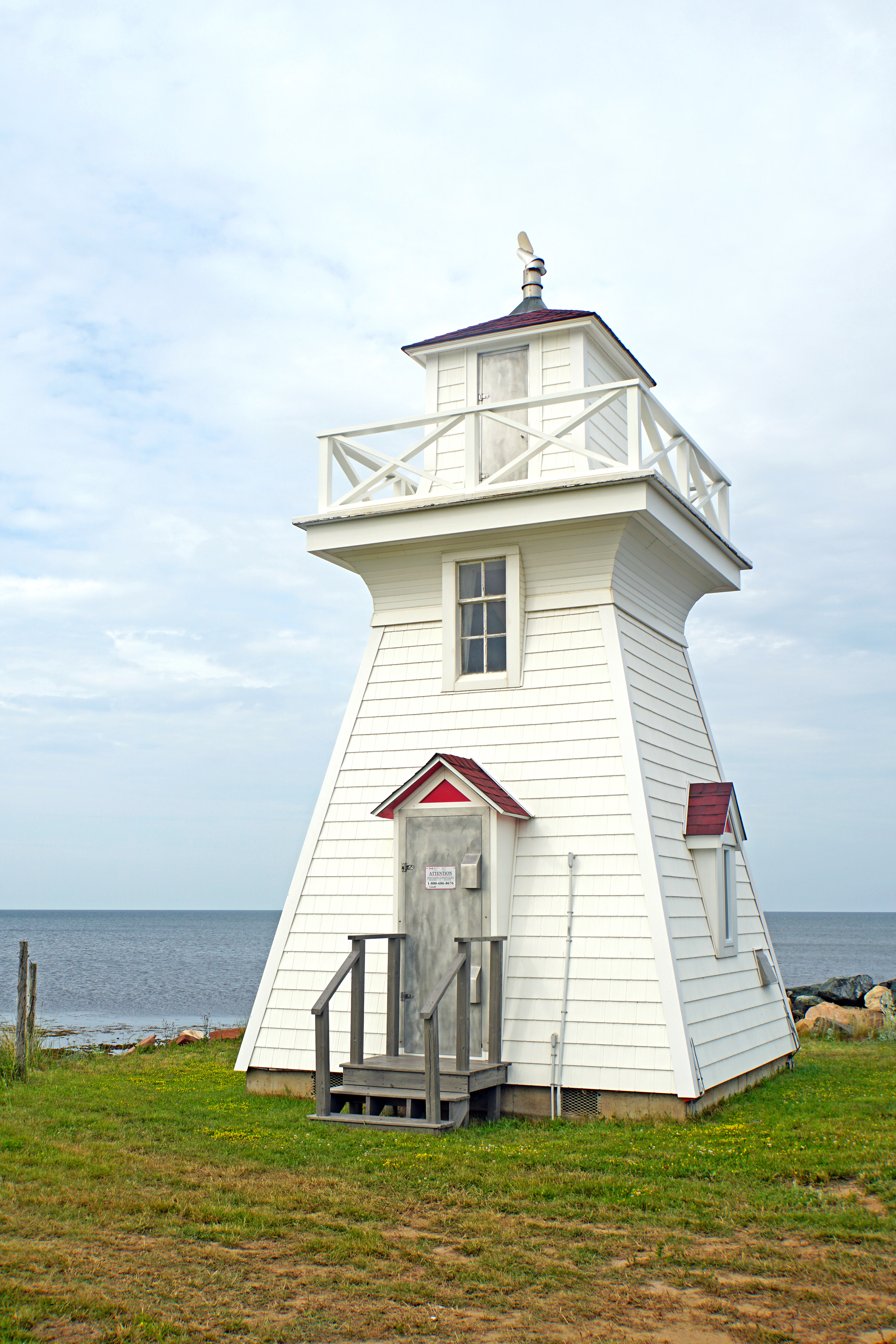
- Constructed: 1903
- Foundation: concrete base
- Construction: wooden tower
- Height: 8 m (26 ft)
- Shape: square truncated tower with balcony and lantern
- Markings: white tower, red lantern roof and vertical stripe on the range line
- Power source: solar power
- Operator: Canadian Coast Guard
- Focal height: 8 m (26 ft)
- Range: 13 nmi (24 km; 15 mi)
- Characteristic: F Y

Caraquet (English: /ˈkɑːrəkɛt/ French pronunciation: [kaʁakɛt]) is a town in Gloucester County, New Brunswick, Canada.

Situated on the shore of Chaleur Bay in the Acadian Peninsula, its name is derived from the Mi'kmaq term for meeting of two rivers. The Caraquet River and Rivière du Nord flow into the Caraquet Bay west of the town.

On 1 January 2023, the town was greatly enlarged by annexing the village of Bas-Caraquet and all or part of seven local service districts; the annexed communities' names remain in official use. Revised census figures have not been released.

== Establishment ==
Caraquet was first settled by Gabriel Giraud dit St-Jean who was a French trader and merchant. He married a Mi'kmaq woman and settled in Lower Caraquet. After the expulsion of the Acadians from southern New Brunswick and Nova Scotia in 1755, some Acadians settled in Upper Caraquet. Led by Alexis Landry in 1757, the original town site was founded at what is now called Sainte-Anne-du-Bocage. The land was officially granted for the town in 1774 through the Royal Proclamation to 34 families of Acadian, Normand and Mi'kmaq origins.

The town is called Acadia's capital by its residents. Caraquet hosts the annual Acadian Festival held each August, with the culmination being the Tintamarre on August 15. 48.2% of people aged over 15 years have a certificate, diploma or post-secondary degree, compared to 44.6% for the province.

== History ==
The Mi'kmaq were the first to have visited the region, as early as 4000 years ago. Objects have been discovered in the port but it is thought they used the place as a camp and not as a village. The Vikings had visited the region from the year one thousand. Jacques Cartier explored the surrounding area in 1534. In 1713, Great Britain obtained Acadia in the Treaty of Utrecht. Caraquet was founded around 1731 by the Breton Gabriel Giraud dit Saint-Jean. It stood on the present site of the border with Bas-Caraquet.

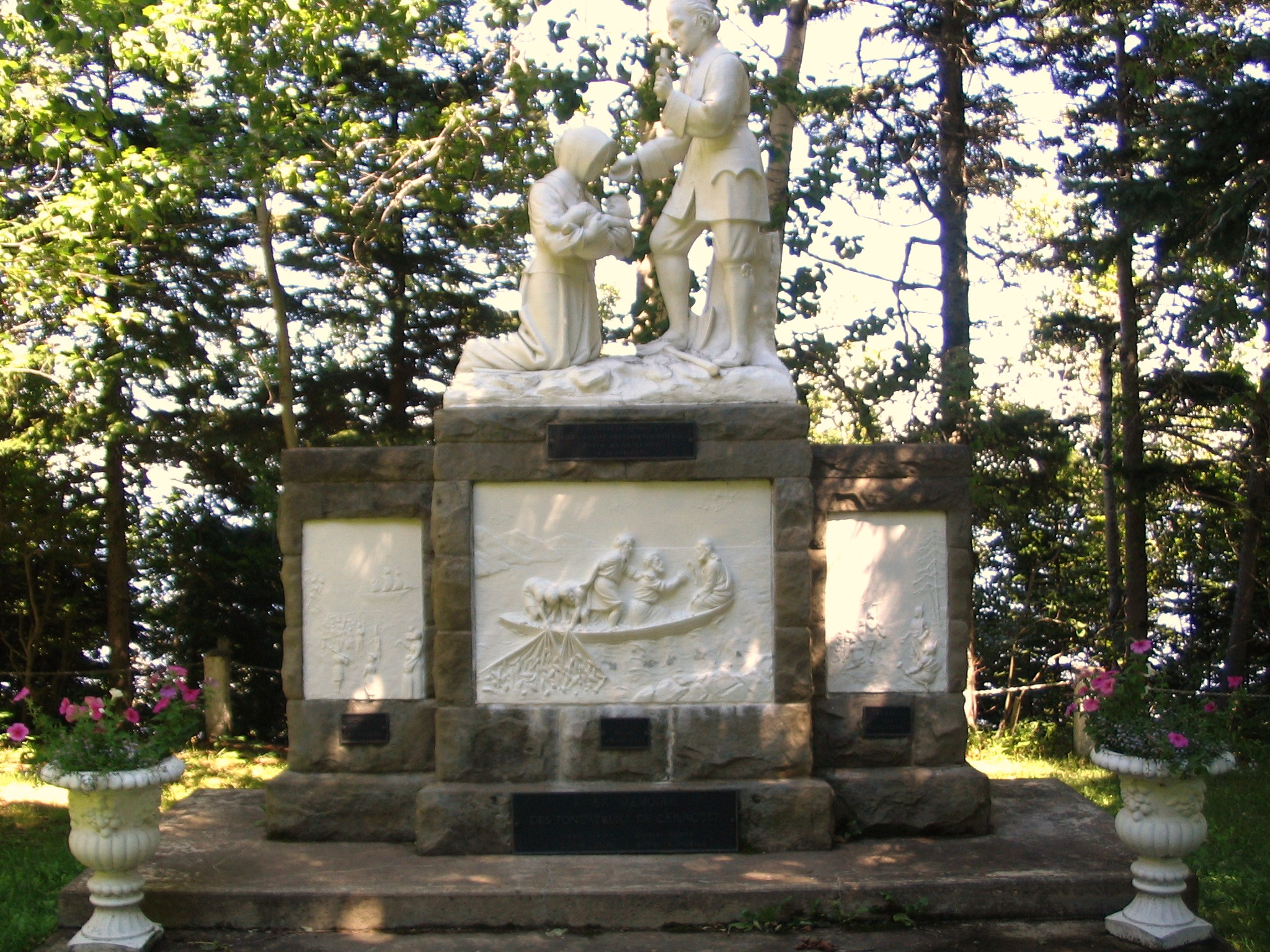
Monument to the Founding of Caraquet

In 1755, the British took Fort Beauséjour and began the deportation of the Acadians. A group of survivors led by Alexis Landry took refuge in Caraquet in 1757 at a place called Sainte-Anne-du-Bocage. Several privateers, Captain Saint-Simon and survivors of the Battle of the Restigouche took refuge in the village of Gabriel Giraud in 1760. The following year, Pierre du Calvet made a census of the Chaleur Bay, whose purpose was to determine where and how many Acadians were hiding there. In retaliation for the Battle, Roderick MacKenzie captured most of the refugees, including 20 people of the 174 then in Caraquet. The rest of the population emigrated to other places in the Bay of Chaleur, especially Miscou and Bonaventure.

In 1763, Great Britain finally dispossessed Louis XV of North America in the Treaty of Paris. George III's Royal Proclamation of 1763 and administrative changes the next year then allowed Acadians on land not occupied by the British. Most families returned to Caraquet from 1766. Bourdages Raymond founded a fishing station in 1762 but it was the target of attacks by American privateers in 1776 and by Micmac in 1779. In 1784, François Gionet walked to Halifax where the Great Grant was obtained, legalizing the occupation of Caraquet by 34 families of 57 km^{2} (22 sq mi). Families of Norman fishermen had meanwhile established themselves in town and were followed by French Canadians.

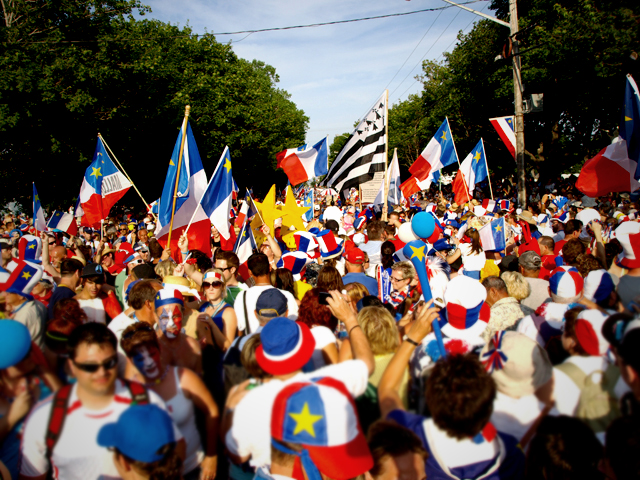
The Tintamarre on National Acadian Day in Caraquet

Merchants from England, Scotland and Jersey settled in Caraquet from the early nineteenth century. Despite their small number, they would control the economy and politics of the city for a century. Charles Robin and Company opened an important fishery in 1837, followed by that of Robert Young in 1850. The government of George King voted in the Common Schools Act in 1871 which removed any religious presence in schools and made education difficult in French. The precarious economic situation of fishermen, the discontent caused by the Common Schools Act and the attempts of the Anglophones to control the board led to Acadian protests in January 1875. Following property damage from the protests, Robert Young ordered police to the city and supplemented them with a private militia. When militiamen attempted to force entry to an Acadian household on January 27, 1875, an exchange of gunfire resulted and militiaman John Gifford and Acadian Louis Mailloux were shot and killed. Calm was restored and the population got some concessions.

Despite the Industrial Revolution, Canadian Confederation hurt the Maritime Provinces. To counter the exodus of the population and control of fishing companies, new farming villages were founded. In 1864, the engineer Sanford Fleming proposed to build the Intercolonial Railway from Montreal to Pokesudie through Caraquet. While the final route was diverted south to Halifax in 1868, the line was built to Caraquet in 1887 following a part of the originally proposed route. The opening of the railway increased economic development with the opening of shops and hotels as well as a change of habits. The College Sacre Coeur opened its doors in 1899 but was destroyed by fire in 1914; it moved to Bathurst the next year. The Fifth National Acadian Convention was held in 1905.

Topographic map of Caraquet. 1 - Éco-Musée de l'Huître - 2 - L'Acadie Nouvelle - 3 - Place Saint-Pierre - 4 - Fédération des Caisses populaires acadiennes - 5 - Villa Beauséjour - 6 - Caraquet cemetery - 7 - Town Hall, Cultural centre, park, Marguerite-Bourgeoys school, Polyvalente Louis-Mailloux - 8 - Caraquet cooperative - 9 - Place Caraquet - 10 - Hôpital de l'Enfant-Jésus - 11 - New Brunswick School of Fisheries, Musée acadien - 12 - Carrefour de la Mer, marina, fish plants - 13 - Lieu Gabriel-Giraud

== Demographics ==
In the 2021 Census of Population conducted by Statistics Canada, Caraquet had a population of 4,285 living in 1,988 of its 2,150 total private dwellings, a change of 0.9% from its 2016 population of 4,248. With a land area of 68.13 km^{2} (26.31 sq mi), it had a population density of 62.9/km^{2} (162.9/sq mi) in 2021.

Canada census – Caraquet community profile

	2021	2016	2011
Population	1,261 (-5.7% from 2016)	4,248 (+1.9% from 2011)	4,169 (+0.3% from 2006)
Land area	109.32 km^{2} (42.21 sq mi)	68.35 km^{2} (26.39 sq mi)	68.26 km^{2} (26.36 sq mi)
Population density	11.5/km^{2} (30/sq mi)	62.1/km^{2} (161/sq mi)	61.1/km^{2} (158/sq mi)
Median age	55.6 (M: 56.0, F: 54.8)	50.5 (M: 49.1, F: 52.0)	48.5 (M: 47.2, F: 49.6)
Private dwellings	659 (total) 602 (occupied)	2,075 (total)	1,943 (total)
Median household income	$63,600	$57,259	$43,057

References: 2021 2016 2011

Historical Census Data - Caraquet, New Brunswick

Year	Pop.	±%
1976	3,950	—
1981	4,315	+9.2%
1986	4,490	+4.1%

Year	Pop.	±%
1991	4,556	+1.5%
1996	4,653	+2.1%
2001	4,442	−4.5%

Year	Pop.	±%
2006	4,156	−6.4%
2011	4,169	+0.3%
2016	4,248	+1.9%

=== Language ===
Canada Census Mother Tongue - Caraquet, New Brunswick
Census	Total	French			English			French & English			Other		
Year	Responses	Count	Trend	Pop %	Count	Trend	Pop %	Count	Trend	Pop %	Count	Trend	Pop %
2011	4,030	3,930	▼2.1%	97.52%	65	▲18.2%	1.61%	15	▲ n/a%	0.37%	20	▲100.0%	0.50%
2006	4,080	4,015	▼5.6%	98.41%	55	▲22.2%	1.35%	0	▼100.0%	0.00%	10	▼77.8%	0.24%
2001	4,360	4,255	▼5.3%	97.59%	45	▼18.2%	1.03%	15	0.0%	0.34%	45	▲50.0%	1.03%
1996	4,595	4,495	n/a	97.82%	55	n/a	1.20%	15	n/a	0.33%	30	n/a	0.65%

== Economy ==
Caraquet's economy is primarily marine resource-based, with a fishing wharf and seaport. Several beaches and other tourist attractions, such as the Village Historique Acadien, are located in the area. New Brunswick's only francophone daily newspaper, L'Acadie Nouvelle, is published in Caraquet.

== Culture ==
=== Novels ===
Caraquet is featured in Phantom Ships: A Novel by Claude Le Bouthillier.

== See also ==
- List of lighthouses in New Brunswick
- List of communities in New Brunswick
- Port of Caraquet
- Louis Mailloux Affair
- Sacré-Cœur College
- Haut-Caraquet
