= Pokemouche =

Pokemouche is a Mi'kmaq word and may refer to the following in the Canadian province of New Brunswick:

- Pokemouche River, a tributary of the Gulf of Saint Lawrence
- Pokemouche 13, New Brunswick, properly known as Pokemouche Indian Reserve No. 13, an Indian reserve located along the southern bank of the river
- Pokemouche, New Brunswick, a local service district straddling the river; includes the community of Pokemouche
- Pokemouche Airport, an airport located in Village-Blanchard, north of Pokemouche
- Baie de Pokemouche, a bay near the mouth of the Pokemouche River
- Baie de Petit-Pokemouche, a bay to the northeast of the Pokemouche River
- Baie du Petit Pokemouche, an LSD in Shippegan Parish, New Brunswick
- Pokemouche Gully, a channel forming the mouth of the Pokemouche River
- Pokemouche Landing, an unincorporated community east of Saint-Sauveur
