= Île-de-Lamèque =

- Town
- Location within New Brunswick
- Coordinates: 47°47′33″N 64°39′11″W
- Country: Canada
- Province: New Brunswick
- County: Gloucester
- Regional service commission: Acadian Peninsula
- Incorporated: January 1, 2023

Government
  - Type: Town council
  - Mayor: Colette Plourde
- Time zone: UTC-4 (AST)
  - Summer (DST): UTC-3 (ADT)
- Postal code(s): E8T
- Area code: 506
- Highways Route 113: Route 305; Route 310; Route 313

Île-de-Lamèque (French pronunciation: [il də lamɛk], transl. Lamèque Island) is a town in the Canadian province of New Brunswick. It was formed through the 2023 New Brunswick local governance reforms.

== History ==
Île-de-Lamèque was incorporated on January 1, 2023 via the amalgamation of the former town of Lamèque and the former village of Sainte-Marie-Saint-Raphaël as well as the concurrent annexation of adjacent unincorporated areas.

== Economy ==
Île-de-Lamèque's economy is tied to the fishing and peat industries.

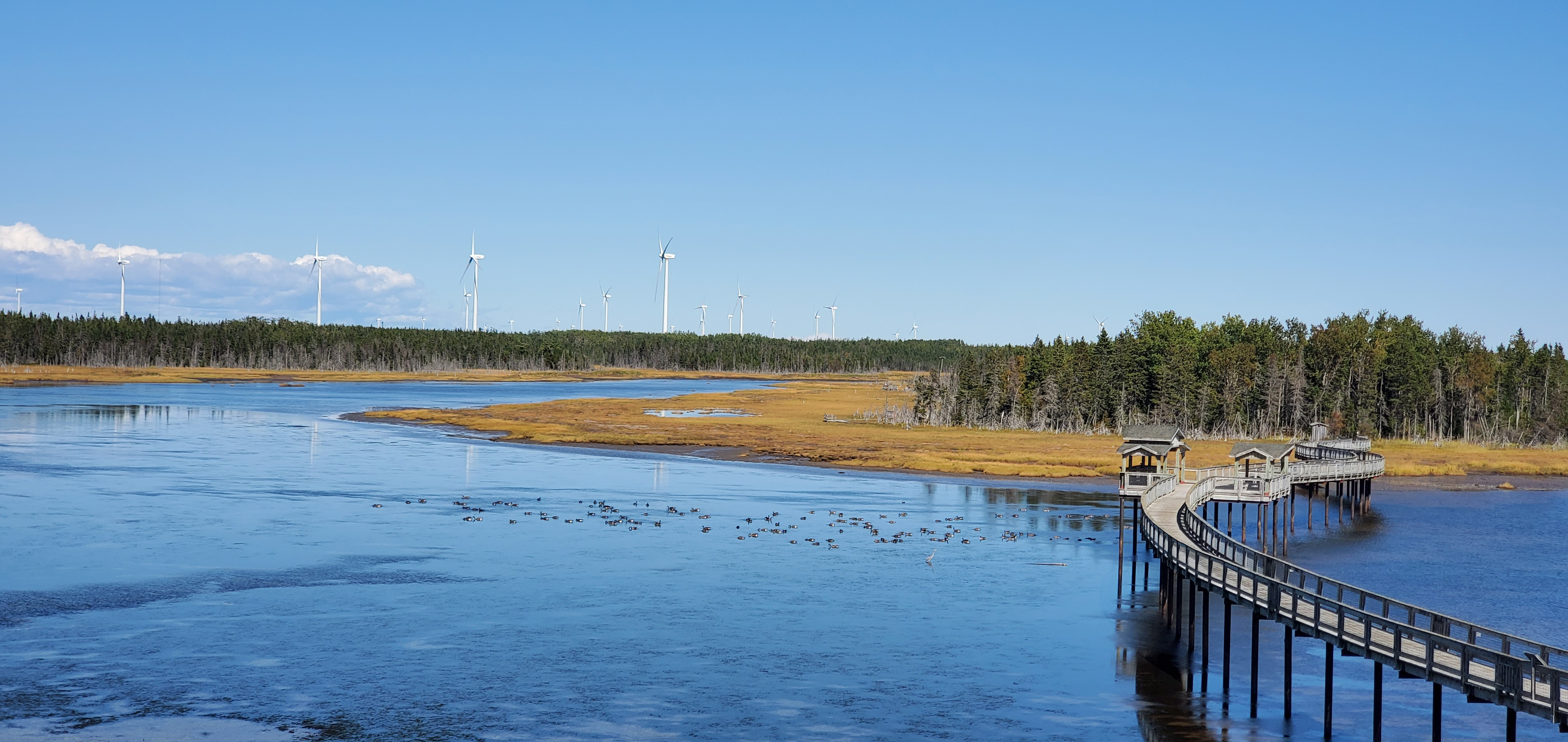
Ecological Park of the Acadian Peninsula in Île-de-Lamèque

== Attractions ==
The Lamèque Eco-Parc offers numerous flora and fauna features representative of the Acadian Peninsula.

== See also ==
- List of communities in New Brunswick
- List of municipalities in New Brunswick
