= New Brunswick Route 345 =

Highway in New Brunswick, Canada

Route 345

Route information
- Maintained by New Brunswick Department of Transportation
- Length: 7 km (4.3 mi)

Major junctions
- North end: Route 11 in Pokemouche
- South end: Route 113 in Inkerman Ferry

Location
- Country: Canada
- Province: New Brunswick
- Communities: Evangeline

Highway system
- Provincial highways in New Brunswick; Former routes
← Route 340	→ Route 350

Route 345 is a 7-kilometre (4.3 mi) long east–west secondary riverfront highway in the north-east portion of New Brunswick, Canada.

The route's eastern terminus is in the community of Upper Pokemouche. The road travels east, crossing the Pokemouche River, then Route 335, before entering the community of Evangeline. From there, the road passes Patricks Cove then continues to Inkerman Ferry ending at the intersection of Route 113.

== Intersecting routes ==
- Route 335
