= Lamèque =

- Seal

- Location within New Brunswick
- Coordinates: 47°47′33″N 64°39′11″W
- Country: Canada
- Province: New Brunswick
- County: Gloucester
- Parish: Shippagan
- Town: Île-de-Lamèque
- Founded: 1790
- Incorporated (Village): November 6, 1966
- Incorporated (Town): September 1, 1982

Area
  - Land: 12.40 km^{2} (4.79 sq mi)

Population (2021)
  - Total: 1,301
  - Density: 104.9/km^{2} (272/sq mi)
  - Change (2016–21): ▲1.2%
  - Dwellings: 606
- Time zone: UTC-4 (AST)
  - Summer (DST): UTC-3 (ADT)
- Postal code(s): E8T
- Area code: 506
- Highways Route 113: Route 310; Route 313
- Website: www.lameque.ca

Lamèque (French pronunciation: [lamɛk]) is a former town in Gloucester County, New Brunswick, Canada. It held town status prior to 2023 and is now part of the town of Île-de-Lamèque.

Of Amerindian rather than French origin, "Lamèque" comes from the Mi'kmaq Elmugwadasik, a descriptive reference to the fact that "the head of the tidal river is turned to one side". The name of the island approved by the Canadian Permanent Committee on Geographical Names in 1974, the result of a local petition replaced the earlier Shippegan.

== History ==
A Francophone community, it is situated on Lamèque Island, off the northeastern tip of the Acadian Peninsula. Lamèque has hosted an annual baroque music festival every summer since 1975.

On 1 January 2023, Lamèque amalgamated with the village of Sainte-Marie-Saint-Raphaël and annexed the local service districts making up the remainder of Lamèque Island to form the new town of Île-de-Lamèque. Lamèque's name remains in official use as a community.

== Demographics ==
In the 2021 Census of Population conducted by Statistics Canada, Lamèque had a population of 1,301 living in 577 of its 606 total private dwellings, a change of 1.2% from its 2016 population of 1,285. With a land area of 12.4 km^{2} (4.8 sq mi), it had a population density of 104.9/km^{2} (271.7/sq mi) in 2021.

Canada census – Lamèque community profile

	2021	2016	2011
Population	1,301 (+1.2% from 2016)	1,285 (-10.3% from 2011)	1,432 (+0.7% from 2006)
Land area	12.40 km^{2} (4.79 sq mi)	12.51 km^{2} (4.83 sq mi)	12.45 km^{2} (4.81 sq mi)
Population density	104.9/km^{2} (272/sq mi)	102.8/km^{2} (266/sq mi)	115.1/km^{2} (298/sq mi)
Median age	56.0 (M: 53.6, F: 57.6)	54.0 (M: 53.7, F: 54.3)	49.9 (M: 49.5, F: 50.4)
Private dwellings	606 (total) 577 (occupied)	619 (total)	615 (total)
Median household income	$61,600	$58,880	$45,362

References: 2021 2016 2011

Historical Census Data - Lamèque, New Brunswick

Year	Pop.	±%
1991	1,687	—
1996	1,671	−0.9%

Year	Pop.	±%
2001	1,580	−5.4%
2006	1,422	−10.0%

Year	Pop.	±%
2011	1,432	+0.7%
2016	1,285	−10.3%

=== Language ===
Canada Census Mother Tongue - Lamèque, New Brunswick
Census	Total	French			English			French & English			Other		
Year	Responses	Count	Trend	Pop %	Count	Trend	Pop %	Count	Trend	Pop %	Count	Trend	Pop %
2011	1,370	1,360	▲2.3%	99.27%	10	▲ n/a%	0.73%	0	0.0%	0.00%	0	0.0%	0.00%
2006	1,330	1,330	▼10.1%	100.00%	0	▼100.0%	0.00%	0	0.0%	0.00%	0	0.0%	0.00%
2001	1,495	1,480	▼5.1%	99.00%	15	▼50.0%	1.00%	0	0.0%	0.00%	0	0.0%	0.00%
1996	1,590	1,560	n/a	98.11%	30	n/a	1.89%	0	n/a	0.00%	0	n/a	0.00%

== Economy ==
Lamèque's economy is tied to the fishing and peat industries.

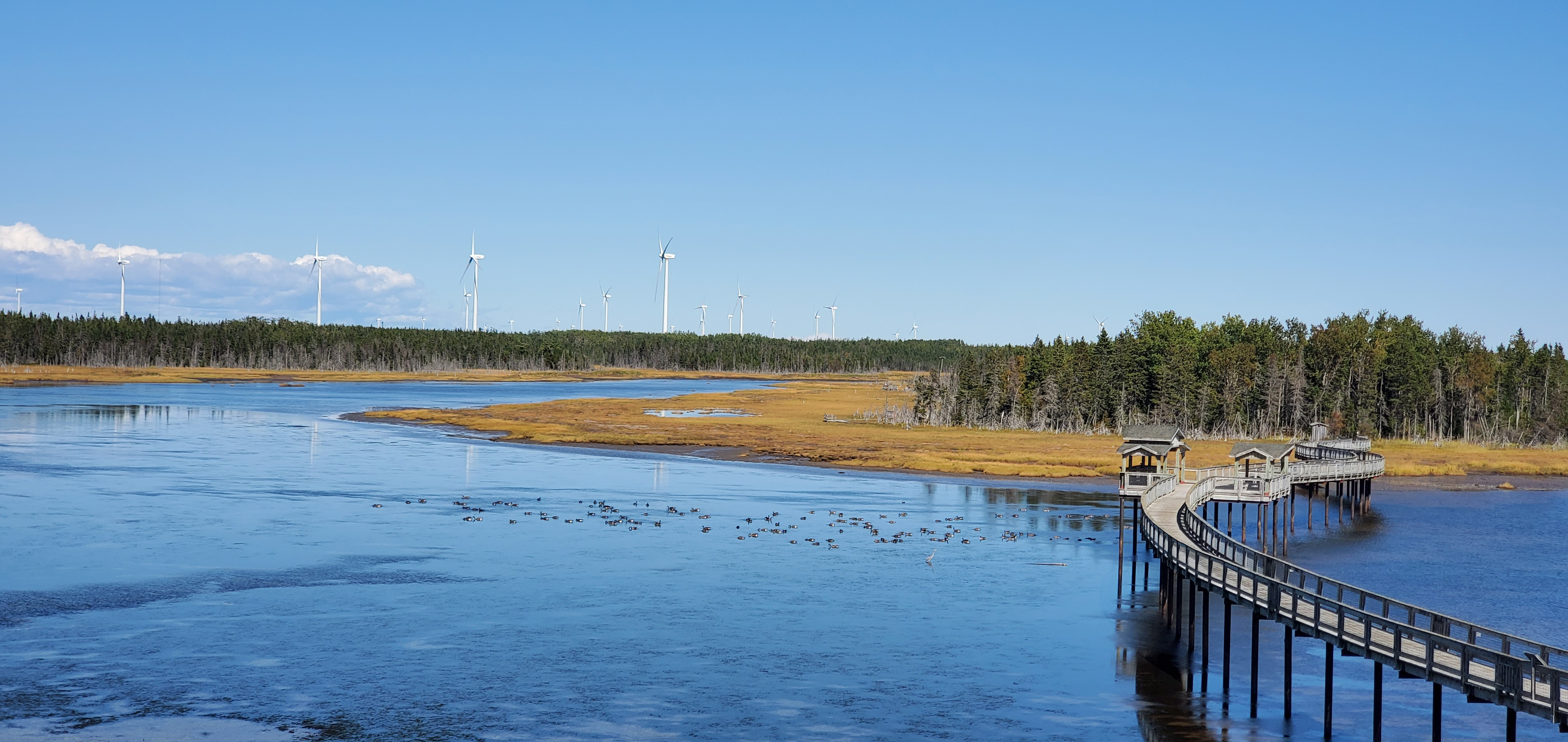
Ecological Park of the Acadian Peninsula in Lamèque

== Attractions ==
The Lamèque Eco-Parc offers numerous flora and fauna features representative of the Acadian Peninsula.

== See also ==
- List of communities in New Brunswick
