= Miscou Lighthouse =

Miscou Lighthouse can refer to:

- The Miscou Island Lighthouse, centre of Miscou Provincial Park
  - Miscou Lighthouse, a community near the lighthouse
