= James Murray (British Army officer, born 1721) =

British army officer and colonial administrator (1721–1794)

General James Murray FRS
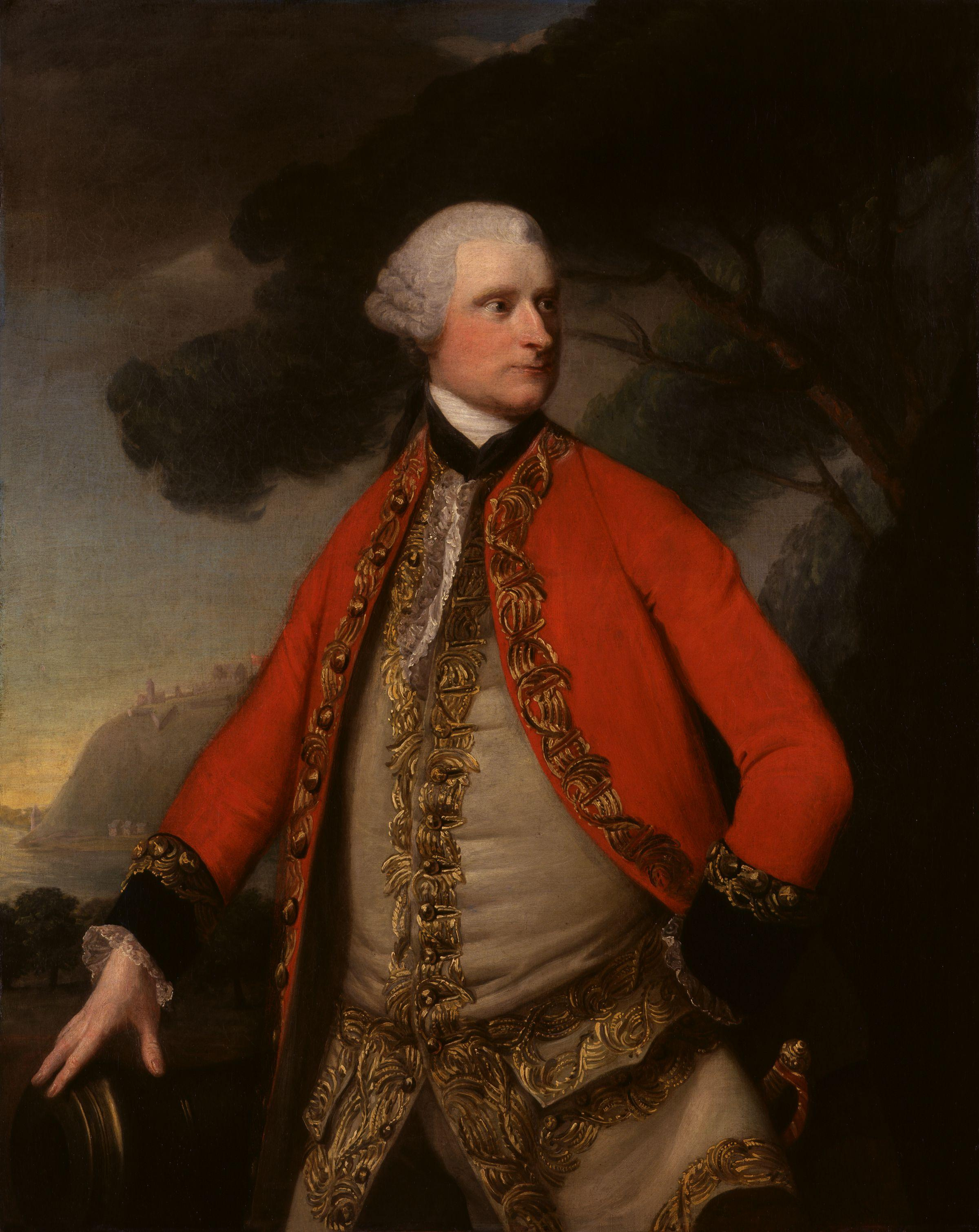
- c. 1765–1770 portrait

Governor of the Province of Quebec
- In office 1764–1768
- Monarch: George III
- Preceded by: Jeffery Amherst
- Succeeded by: Guy Carleton

Governor of Minorca
- In office 1778–1782
- Monarch: George III
- Preceded by: James Johnston
- Succeeded by: Spanish occupation

Governor of Kingston-upon-Hull
- In office 1785–1794
- Monarch: George III
- Preceded by: Philip Honywood
- Succeeded by: The Marquess Townshend

Personal details
- Born: 21 January 1721 Ballencrieff, East Lothian
- Died: 18 June 1794 (aged 73) Battle, East Sussex

Military service
- Allegiance: Dutch Republic; Great Britain
- Branch/service: Dutch States Army; British Army
- Years of service: 1736–1789
- Rank: General (British Army)
- Unit: Scots Brigade; John Wynyard's Regiment of Marines; 15th Regiment of Foot
- Battles/wars: War of Jenkins' Ear; Battle of Cartagena de Indias; War of the Austrian Succession; Siege of Ostend (1745); Raid on Lorient; Seven Years' War; Raid on Rochefort; French and Indian War; Siege of Louisbourg (1758); Gulf of St. Lawrence campaign (1758); Battle of the Plains of Abraham; Battle of Sainte-Foy; Siege of Quebec (1760); Montreal campaign; American War of Independence; Invasion of Minorca (1781) (surrendered)

General James Murray FRS (20 January 1721 – 18 June 1794) was a British army officer and colonial administrator who served as the governor of the Province of Quebec from 1764 to 1768 and governor of Minorca from 1778 to 1782. Born in Ballencrieff, East Lothian, Murray served in the War of Jenkins' Ear, War of the Austrian Succession and Seven Years' War. He came to prominence during the French and Indian War and following the conflict's end in 1763 began serving as the new governor of the newly-founded British colony of Quebec. His administration was noted for its successes, being marked by positive relationships with French Canadians, who were reassured of the traditional rights and customs. Murray died in Battle, East Sussex in 1794.

== Early life ==
Born in Ballencrieff, East Lothian, Murray was a younger son of Lord Elibank Alexander Murray, 4th Lord Elibank, and his wife, Elizabeth Stirling. His cousin was Alexander Murray who served in Nova Scotia. Educated in Haddington, East Lothian and Selkirk, Scottish Borders, he began his military career in 1736 as an officer in the Dutch States Army's Scots Brigade. In 1740 Murray left the Dutch army and was commissioned into the British Army as a second lieutenant in John Wynyard's Regiment of Marines under his brother Patrick Murray, 5th Lord Elibank, participating in the Battle of Cartagena de Indias. He was promoted to captain in 1742 and commanded the 15th Regiment of Foot's grenadier company during the War of the Austrian Succession. Murray was severely wounded during the siege of Ostend in 1745 and distinguished himself in the raid on Lorient in 1746. In December 1748, he married Cordelia Collier, who was from Hastings.

== Career in Canada ==
James Murray purchased a commission for major in the 15th Regiment of Foot in 1749, and the lieutenant-colonelcy in 1751. He commanded his regiment in the Raid on Rochefort in 1757, defending Sir John Mordaunt in his subsequent court-martial. He commanded a battalion in the 1758 Siege of Louisbourg along with his brother Alexander.

When Louisbourg was taken, Murray accompanied General Wolfe on a raiding expedition northwards in the Gulf of St. Lawrence Campaign (1758). While Wolfe destroyed French settlements along the Gaspe Peninsula, Murray harried the French fishing settlements along Miramichi Bay. Part of the destruction included the homes and church at St. Anne's, now called Burnt Church.

Murray served under General James Wolfe at the Battle of the Plains of Abraham in 1759. Murray believed Wolfe's plan to land the army at Anse au Foulon was foolish and absurd, and succeeded "only by Providence". He was the military commander of Quebec City after it fell to the British. Lévis managed to defeat Murray and the British in the Battle of Sainte-Foy in 1760. As a result, the French managed to lay siege to Quebec but this had to be abandoned due to a lack of supplies and the arrival of a British relief fleet.

A May 1760 order to execute and gibbet the aged Capt. Joseph Nadeau, caught recruiting militia for the French in nearby St. Michel, is remembered as draconian in Quebec folklore. Some versions claim Murray in peace regretted this sentence as impulsive, and that he adopted two of Nadeau's orphaned daughters - if possibly as domestic servants - whom he later took to Britain with him.

Murray's successful part in the British advance on Montreal in which he pacified many of the French Canadians, showed his true worth as a military commander and a negotiator. On 5 September 1760, Murray signed a Treaty of Peace and Friendship with the Huron Nation, then residing at Lorette, near Quebec City. In 1990, that treaty was found by the Supreme Court of Canada to still be valid and binding on the Crown.

=== Governor of Quebec ===
In October 1760 Murray was confirmed in-place as British military governor of the district of Quebec. In June 1762 he submitted an omnibus report on the state of the country in some 60 pages, inaugurating central Canada's British governance, and thereafter being confirmed the first civil governor of the new Province of Quebec on 4 October 1763.

Deploying his fluent French and care to avoid inciting rebellion, as governor he was sympathetic to the French-Canadians, favouring them over Anglo-American merchants who came in the wake of the conquest, yet remained vastly outnumbered. To the east, a previous British annexation of Acadia from France had resulted in decades of internecine sectarian conflict on the Maine frontier, until that population's traumatic deportation in the war just concluded. No evidence suggests any British interest in a larger deportation in peacetime, and neither for permanent commitment of occupation forces comparable to those historically required to impose Protestant-ascendency on a disenfranchised Catholic majority in Ireland. British and other settlers continued to prefer the warmer and wealthier American colonies, showing no foreseeable prospect subsuming French-Canadians in the eighteen century.

At Quebec under Murray the Scots-speaking arrivals, conspicuously including veterans of the Major-General's own 78th Fraser Highlanders, included many from clans of historic Jacobite loyalty, and traditions of alliance with France. Their fathers and forefathers had rebelled against the unionist Crown as recently as at Culloden a decade prior, where Murray's distant kinsman had commanded the Catholic pretender's forces against a young Wolfe. His own elder brother, Lord Elibank, was presently exiled from Britain over his foiled 1752 plot to kidnap King George II.

Murray therefore ignored mandate of a new Whig government's Royal Proclamation of 1763, and its amplifying private instructions, to establish an elected Assembly when British law excluded all Catholic populations from government. He gestured instead by seating a rare Huguenot protestant francophone on his council.. To instruction "you are to consider and report to Us, by Our Commissioners for Trade and Plantations, by what other Means the Protestant Religion may be promoted", he negotiated to substitute forbidden Papal appointment of the Bishop of Quebec by a 'superintendent' elected by local clergy, for later ratification by the Holy See. This solution successfully installed the deceased Bishop's secretary, Mgr. Jean-Olivier Briand, from 1764. Despite the Proclamation's assurance that subjects (“may confide in Our Royal Protection for the Enjoyment of the Benefit of the Laws of Our Realm of England"), he did not extend this beyond the urban anglophone arrivals, leaving the local magistrates to continue applying the popular Parisian Civil law code as before, including its independent rights of wives and equality of inheritance which limited bequests. (Anglo-American Common Law then defined a woman as property of her husband, and preferred elder-sons.) Ignoring the potential for land reform, Murray left undisturbed the 'Seigneurial' distribution of feudal farming hierarchies, excepting to discharge three Fraser officers who purchased seigneuries of their own in 1763, assimilating themselves into the old order.

Murray was promoted Major-General on 26 March 1765. Complaints of the Anglo-American merchants achieved his recall in 1766 (remaining governor in name until 1768), but his Irish deputy succeeding him, Sir Guy Carleton, was allowed to maintain Murray's successfully conciliatory approach, eventually formalized and deepened in the 1774 Quebec Act by the 1770 Tory government of Lord North. Besides confirming French Civil Law, Murray further convinced North to enact a reworded oath of allegiance avoiding any disavowal of the Papacy, and to restore direct taxation by the Catholic church, supporting its clergy but also the church-run schools and hospitals. (Both steps infuriated Protestant opinion in the southerly of the continent's 18 mainland British possessions. The Continental Congress there in the following year cited the Quebec Act among 'Intolerable Acts' justifying American independence, to include the northerly colonies by invasion of 1775.)

Murray took no steps to restrict Quebec's established urban domestic slavery. After his departure, an advertisement appeared in the 1769 'Quebec Gazette' offering a "negro woman, aged 25 years, with a mulatto male child... formerly the property of General Murray".

On his return to Great Britain he was appointed Colonel of the 13th Regiment of Foot, a post he held from 1767 to 1789.

== Minorca ==
Murray was lieutenant-governor from 1774 to 1778 and then governor of Minorca from 1778 to 1782. In 1780, he married, as his second wife, Ann Witham, daughter of the Consul-General there. During the American War of Independence, he defended Fort St. Philip, at Port Mahon, against a Franco-Spanish siege for seven months (1781–82), until forced to surrender. He was known as ‘Old Minorca’ Murray as a result.

He then returned to his home, Beauport Park, in Hollington, Sussex, where he died. Further honours came to him in his last years: he was appointed General, and Governor of Kingston-upon-Hull in 1783, and Colonel of the 21st (Royal North British) Fusiliers in 1789. His body was laid to rest in the apse of the now ruined Old St Helen's Church, Hastings.

== Family ==
His first marriage had been childless, but with his second wife Ann Witham, he had six children (two of whom died in infancy):

- James Patrick Murray, later a major general, who married Elizabeth Rushworth
- Cordelia Murray, who married Rev. Henry Hodges
- Wilhelmina Murray, married James Douglas, 4th Baron Douglas.
- George Murray (died in infancy)
- Elizabeth Mary Murray (died in infancy)
- Anne Harriet Murray

He and his wife also brought up his older brother Patrick, Lord Elibank's illegitimate daughter Maria Murray.

He encouraged his favourite nephew Patrick Ferguson to follow him in a military career. Patrick was the son of Murray's sister Anne who was married to Lord Pitfour.

He also assisted another nephew, Patrick Murray, illegitimate son of his brother, George.

== Popular culture ==
Murray appears in the 2004 film Battle of the Brave (Nouvelle-France) in his role as Governor of the new-captured Quebec. He is portrayed by Michael Maloney. He also appears in the same capacity in three episodes of the mini-series Marguerite Volant, where he is portrayed by Graham Harley.

== See also ==
- Great Britain in the Seven Years War
- List of governors general of Canada
- List of governors of Menorca

== Notes ==
Government offices
Preceded by Jeffery Amherst	Governor of the Province of Quebec; 1764–1768	Succeeded by Guy Carleton
Military offices
Preceded by Hon. Robert Monckton	Colonel of the 2nd Battalion, 60th (Royal American) Regiment of Foot; 1759–1767	Succeeded by Bigoe Armstrong
Preceded by New office	Governor of Quebec; 1760–1774	Succeeded by James Johnston
Preceded by The Duke of Gloucester	Colonel of the 13th Regiment of Foot; 1767–1789	Succeeded by George Ainslie
Preceded by James Johnston	Lieutenant-Governor of Minorca; 1774–1778	Succeeded by Sir William Draper
Preceded by John Mostyn	Governor of Minorca; 1778–1782	Ceded to Spain
Preceded by Philip Honywood	Governor of Kingston-upon-Hull; 1785–1794	Succeeded by The Marquess Townshend
Preceded by Hon. Alexander Mackay	Colonel of the 21st Regiment of Foot; 1789–1794	Succeeded by James Inglis Hamilton
