= New Brunswick Route 350 =

Highway in New Brunswick, Canada

Route 350

Route information
- Maintained by New Brunswick Department of Transportation

Major junctions
- East end: Route 135 in Hautes-Terres
- West end: Route 11 / Route 113 in Pokemouche

Location
- Country: Canada
- Province: New Brunswick
- Major cities: Rang-Saint Georges, Maltampec, Maltempec, Landry

Highway system
- Provincial highways in New Brunswick; Former routes
| ← Route 345 | → Route 355 |

Route 350 is a 12-kilometre (7.5 mi) long east–west secondary highway in the northeast portion of New Brunswick, Canada.

The route's eastern terminus is in the community of Hautes-Terres. The road travels east to the community of Rang-Saint Georges. The route then follows the Pokemouche River to the community of Maltampec before crossing the Pokemouche River. The route then continues to follow the Main Branch of the Pokemouche River to the community of Maltempec before entering the north shore of the community of Landry. From there, the road crosses another branch of the Pokemouche River before ending on the north side of Pokemouche at the intersection of Route 11 and Route 113.

== Intersecting routes ==
- no major ones
