= Sainte-Marie, New Brunswick =

Sainte-Marie may refer to two places in New Brunswick, Canada:

- Sainte-Marie-de-Kent, New Brunswick
- Ste-Marie-St-Raphaël
