= Inkerman Parish, New Brunswick =

Inkerman
- Parish
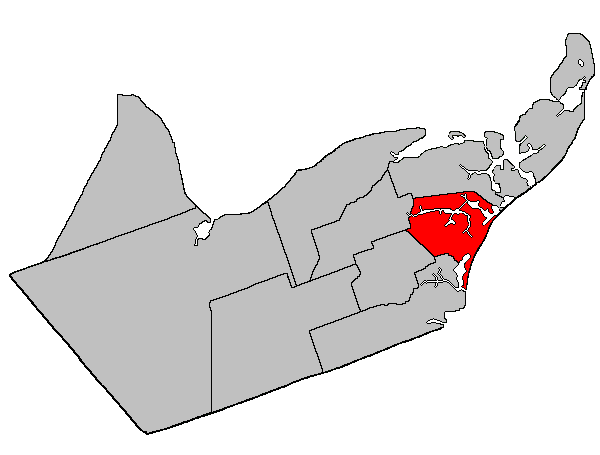
- Location within Gloucester County, New Brunswick map erroneously shows pre-1896 boundaries
- Coordinates: 47.667°N 64.8275°W
- Country: Canada
- Province: New Brunswick
- County: Gloucester
- Erected: 1855

Area
  - Land: 107.63 km^{2} (41.56 sq mi)

Population (2021)
  - Total: 2,373
  - Density: 22/km^{2} (57/sq mi)
  - Change 2016-2021: ▲0.3%
  - Dwellings: 1,162
- Time zone: UTC-4 (AST)
  - Summer (DST): UTC-3 (ADT)
- Figures do not include portion within the regional municipality of Tracadie

Inkerman is a geographic parish in Gloucester County, New Brunswick, Canada. (Note: The Territorial Division Act divides the province into 152 parishes, the cities of Saint John and Fredericton, and one town of Grand Falls. The Interpretation Act clarifies that parishes include any local government within their borders.)

For governance purposes it is divided between the towns of Caraquet, Hautes-Terres, and Shippagan, the Pokemouche 13 Indian reserve, the regional municipality of Tracadie; all are members of the Acadian Peninsula Regional Service Commission.

Prior to the 2023 governance reform, the parish was divided between Tracadie and the local service districts of Evangéline, Inkerman Centre, Landry Office, Maltempec, (Note: The community within the former LSD is spelt Maltampec.) and Pokemouche.

The local service district of the same name, which included only part of the parish, was amalgamated into the Regional Municipality of Grand Tracadie–Sheila on July 1, 2014, causing some misunderstanding of its status.

== Origin of name ==
The parish is named after the Battle of Inkerman in the Crimean War, fought in 1854.

== History ==
Inkerman was erected in 1855 from Saumarez Parish.

In 1870, the boundary with Saumarez Parish was adjusted.

In 1881, the western part of Inkerman was included in the newly erected Saint-Isidore.

== Boundaries ==
Inkerman Parish is bounded:

- on the north by a line beginning at the northwestern corner of grant 255 on the western side of Lavigne Road, a bit south of the end of Chemin Gauvin est, easterly to a point on the prolongation of the rear line of the tier of grants on the eastern bank of the Pokemouche River, 300 chains (6.035 km) inland, then southeasterly along the grants to Grande Anse, then southeasterly and southwesterly along the shore to the mouth of the Pokemouche River;
- on the east by the Gulf of Saint Lawrence
- on the south by a line beginning at the Old Tracadie Gully, across Tracadie Bay, up LeBouthillier Brook to Route 11, then southwesterly along grant lines to the north line of grant 145 on the north side of Route 160 and along the grant to where it strikes the Saint-Isidore Parish line;
- on the west by a line running northwesterly from Saint-Raymond Road, at the southeastern corner of grant 144 on the south side of Route 160, to the southern line of Range 6 in the Paquetville South Settlement, which runs along the south side of Val-Doucet Road farther west, then northeastern and northwesterly along Range 6 to the Pokemouche River; then northeasterly in a direct line to the southernmost corner of the tier of grants west of Lavigne Road, then northwest along the rear of four grants in the tier to the northern line of Inkerman.

== Governance ==
The Regional Municipality of Tracadie includes the southern part of the parish, the boundary running generally along the rear lines of grants along the Pokemouche River, Cowans Creek, and the South Branch Pokemouche River below McConnell Brook; the barrier islands along the outer edge of Tracadie Bay are also part of the regional municipality. From east to west, the communities of Four Roads, Six Roads, Boudreau Road, Sainte-Rose-Gloucester, Gaspereau, and Haut-Sainte-Rose are within the regional municipality, as is the part of Pont-Landry within this parish.

In addition to basic LSD services, all LSDs assessed for the voluntary services of street lighting and community & recreation services. Running east to west, the local service districts and Indian reserve were:

Inkerman Centre contained the peninsula east of the South Branch Pokemouche River, all of Inkerman Parish east from the junction of Nardini Road and Route 345, and all of Caraquet Parish south of the wetlands along Jules Brook. The community of Inkerman comprises the peninsula, Inkerman Ferry the area east of the Pokemouche River; the former community of Pokemouche Junction, centred around Nardini Road and Allée Connolly, has been absorbed by Inkerman Ferry. Established in 1970 to provide street lighting. Originally it included Four Roads as far west as Green Point Road but was otherwise much smaller than today; it expanded in 1987 on all sides, lost Évangéline in 1988, and lost Four Roads to Tracadie in 2015. Now part of Shippagan.

Evangéline (French Évangéline) included grants along Route 345 from the junction with Nardini Road west to the junction with Route 11, as well as a short stretch of Route 335. Established in 1988 from parts of Inkerman Centre and Pokemouche; the corresponding taxing authority was Évangeline. The name Waugh appears on the area cadastral map; the Waugh post office was renamed Evangeline in 1949. Now mostly part of Caraquet, with a small area in the southeastern border part of Shippagan.

Pokemouche straddled the Pokemouche River along Route 11; the southern portion comprised grants along the western side of the South Branch Pokemouche River north of McConnell Brook, along the Pokemouche between South Branch Portage River and Cowans Creek, and along Pokemouche Cross Road; the northern portion included Pokemouche River grants west to the mouth of Whalens Brook and a strip of interior grants between the end of Basile Road and Route 350. The communities of Pokemouche and South River were in the southern portion, Upper Pokemouche in the northern; Walsh's Island was between the two. Established in 1987, when it included all of Evangéline west of Route 335. Now part of Shippagan.

Landry Office straddled the Pokemouche, with Landry Centre Road bridging the river. The southern portion included all Pokemouche River grants from the mouth of Cowans Creek to the Indian reserve, grants along the western, northern, and southern sides of Cowans Creek, and a half-dozen interior grants in its southeastern corner. The northern portion contained Pokemouche River grants from Whalens Brook to the end of Landry Road and interior grants along Landry, Godin, and Haché Roads and the west side of Basile Road. A small area west of the Indian reserve was isolated from the rest of the LSD and lacked highway access. The communities of Cowans Creek and Landry were in the southern portion, Haché Road in the northern portion. Established in 1988, it originally ended near Gliddens Brook; Cowans Creek and the southeastern corner were added in 1989. Now mostly part of Caraquet, with the westernmost two grants now part of Tracadie.

Maltempec comprised all grants north of the Pokemouche River and west of the end of Landry Road. Its single community was originally spelt Maltampec. Established in 1987. Now part of Hautes-Terres.

The Pokemouche 13 Indian reserve is on the southern bank of the Pokemouche River, west of the end of Cowans Creek. The reserve belongs to the Esgenoopetitj First Nation and was originally much larger, stretching east to Nowlans Brook; there is no highway access.

The following former LSDs were all annexed by Tracadie in 2014.

The LSD of the parish of Inkerman was established in 1968, when it included the entire parish. By 1989 it was reduced to the community of Six Roads and western Four Roads.

Sainte-Rose was established in 1988, it was formed around the Ste. Rose Settlement, including the communities of Boudreau Road, Gaspereau, Haut-Sainte-Rose, and Sainte-Rose.

Pont Landry was established in 1986 and included the parish south of the Ste. Rose Settlement and grants along Route 355, and west of Carroll Road.

== Communities ==
Communities at least partly within the parish; bold indicates an incorporated entity or Indian reserve; italics indicate a name no longer in official use

- Cowans Creek
- Évangéline
- Haché Road
- Inkerman
- Inkerman Ferry
  - Pokemouche Junction
- Landry
- Maltampec
- Pokemouche
- **Pokemouche 13**
- South River
- Upper Pokemouche
- **Tracadie**
  - Boudreau Road
  - Four Roads
  - Gaspereau
  - Haut-Sainte-Rose
  - Sainte-Rose-Gloucester
  - Six Roads

== Bodies of water ==
Bodies of water (Note: Not including brooks, ponds or coves.) at least partly in the parish:

- Cowans Creek
- Pokemouche River
- Waugh River
- Boudreau Channel
- Pokemouche Bay
- Pokemouche Gully
- Lac à Finn
- Inkerman Lake

== Islands ==
Islands in the parish:

- Polly Island
- Walshs Island

== Demographics ==
Parish population total does not include Regional Municipality of Tracadie or Pokemouche Indian reserve

=== Population ===
Canada census – Inkerman community profile

	2021	2016	2011
Population	2,373 (+0.3% from 2016)	2,366 (-44.3% from 2011)	4,247 (-0.5% from 2006)
Land area	107.63 km^{2} (41.56 sq mi)	107.56 km^{2} (41.53 sq mi)	191.05 km^{2} (73.76 sq mi)
Population density	22/km^{2} (57/sq mi)	22.0/km^{2} (57/sq mi)	22.2/km^{2} (57/sq mi)
Median age	55.2 (M: 55.2, F: 54.8)	52.4 (M: 52.1, F: 52.8)	48.8 (M: 48.4, F: 49.3)
Private dwellings	1,162 (total) 1,035 (occupied)	1,084 (total)	1,844 (total)
Median household income	$63,200	$56,320	$39,146

References: 2021 2016 2011

Historical Census Data - Inkerman Parish, New Brunswick

Year	Pop.	±%
1991	4,614	—
1996	4,636	+0.5%

Year	Pop.	±%
2001	4,367	−5.8%
2006	4,268	−2.3%

Year	Pop.	±%
2011	4,247	−0.5%
2016	2,366	−44.3%

=== Language ===
Canada Census Mother Tongue - Inkerman Parish, New Brunswick
Census	Total	French			English			French & English			Other		
Year	Responses	Count	Trend	Pop %	Count	Trend	Pop %	Count	Trend	Pop %	Count	Trend	Pop %
2011	4,100	3,945	▲0.9%	96.22%	120	▼20.0%	2.93%	35	▲16.7%	0.85%	0	▼100.0%	0.00%
2006	4,135	3,910	▼4.2%	94.56%	150	0.0%	3.63%	30	0.0%	0.72%	45	▲ n/a%	1.09%
2001	4,260	4,080	▼5.5%	95.77%	150	▼23.1%	3.52%	30	▲200.0%	0.70%	0	0.0%	0.00%
1996	4,525	4,320	n/a	95.47%	195	n/a	4.31%	10	n/a	0.22%	0	n/a	0.00%

== See also ==
- List of parishes in New Brunswick
