= USCGC William Tate =

Keeper-class coastal buoy tender of the United States Coast Guard

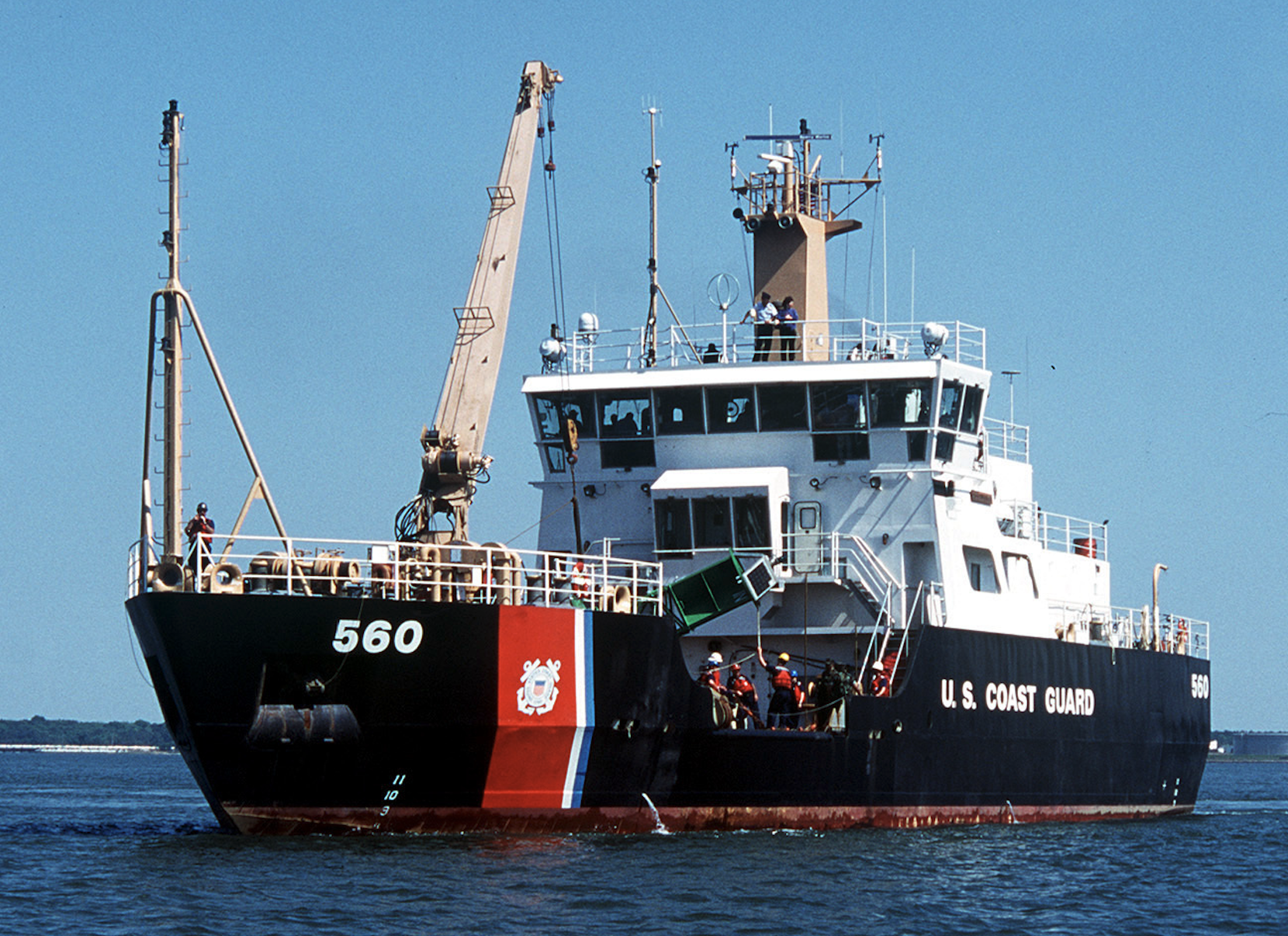
- USCGC William Tate

History

United States
- Name: William Tate
- Operator: US Coast Guard
- Builder: Marinette Marine Corporation
- Launched: 8 May 1999
- Commissioned: 3 June 2000
- Home port: Philadelphia, Pennsylvania
- Identification: IMO number: 9177284; Call sign: NNIA; MMSI number: 338954000
- Status: Active

General characteristics
- Type: Keeper-class buoy tender
- Displacement: 850 long tons (864 t) full load
- Length: 175 ft (53.3 m)
- Beam: 36 ft (11.0 m)
- Draft: 8 ft (2.4 m)
- Installed power: 2,000 hp (1,500 kW) sustained
- Propulsion: 2 × Caterpillar 3508 DITA Diesel engines; bow thruster, 500 hp (373 kW)
- Speed: 12 knots (22 km/h; 14 mph)
- Range: 2000 nautical miles at 10 kn
- Crew: 24 (2 Officers, 22 Enlisted)

USCGC William Tate (WLM-560) is a Keeper-class coastal buoy tender of the United States Coast Guard. Launched in 1999, she is home-ported in Philadelphia, Pennsylvania. Her primary mission is maintaining over 260 aids to navigation on the Delaware River, in Delaware Bay and in nearby waterways. Secondary missions include marine environmental protection, search and rescue, and security. She is assigned to the Fifth Coast Guard District.

== Construction and characteristics ==
On 22 June 1993 the Coast Guard awarded the contract for the Keeper-class vessels to Marinette Marine Corporation in the form of a firm contract for the lead ship and options for thirteen more. The Coast Guard exercised options for the fifth through tenth ships, including William Tate, in February 1997. The ship was launched on 8 May 1999 into the Menominee River. William Tate is the tenth of the fourteen Keeper-class ships built.

Her hull was built of welded steel plates. She is 175 feet (53 m) long, with a beam of 36 feet (11 m), and a full-load draft of 8 feet (2.4 m). William Tate displaces 850 long tons fully loaded. Her gross register tonnage is 904, and her net register tonnage is 271. The top of the mast is 58.75 feet (17.91 m) above the waterline.

Rather than building the ship from the keel up as a single unit, Marinette Marine used a modular fabrication approach. Eight large modules, or "hull blocks" were built separately and then welded together.

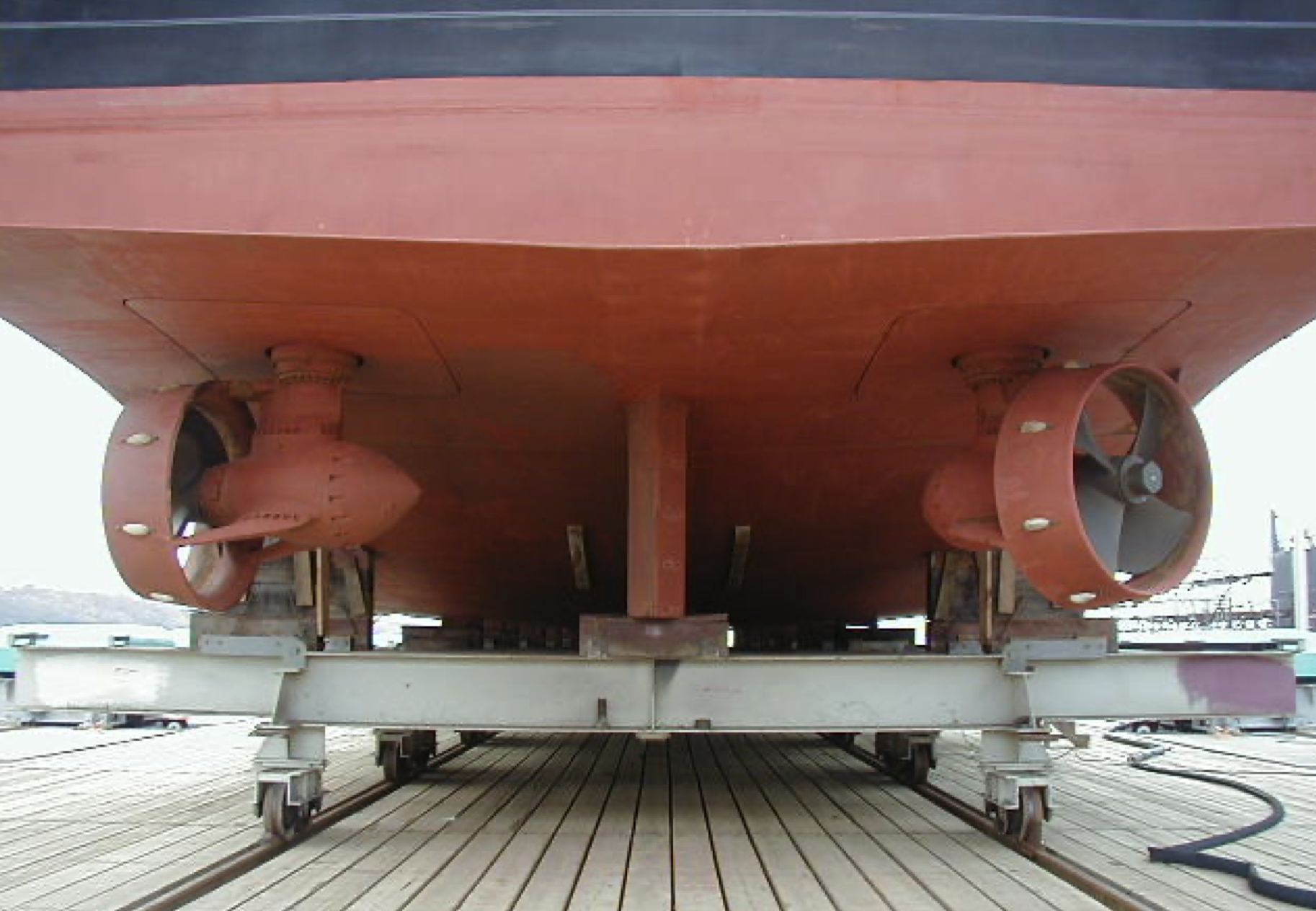
Z-drives on a Keeper-class ship

The ship has two Caterpillar 3508 DITA (direct-injection, turbocharged, aftercooled) 8-cylinder Diesel engines which produce 1000 horsepower each. These drive two Ulstein Z-drives. Keeper-class ships were the first Coast Guard cutters equipped with Z-drives, which markedly improved their maneuverability. The Z-drives have four-bladed propellers which are 57.1 inches (145 cm) in diameter and are equipped with Kort nozzles. They can be operated in "tiller mode" where the Z-drives turn in the same direction to steer the ship, or in "Z-conn mode" where the two Z-drives can turn in different directions to achieve specific maneuvering objectives. An implication of the Z-drives is that there is no reverse gear or rudder aboard William Tate. In order to back the ship, the Z-drives are turned 180 degrees which drives the ship stern-first even though the propellers are spinning in the same direction as they do when the ship is moving forward. Her maximum speed is 12 knots. Her tanks can hold 16,385 gallons of diesel fuel which gives her an unrefueled range of 2,000 nautical miles at 10 knots.

She has a 500 horsepower bow thruster. The Z-drives and bow thruster can be linked in a Dynamic Positioning System. This gives William Tate the ability to hold position in the water even in heavy currents, winds, and swells. This advanced capability is useful in bringing buoys aboard that can weigh more than 16,000 lbs.

Electrical power aboard is provided by three Caterpillar 3406 DITA generators which produce 285 Kw each. She also has a 210 Kw emergency generator, which is a Caterpillar 3406 DIT.

The buoy deck has 1,335 square feet (124.0 m^{2}) of working area. A crane with a boom 42 feet (13 m) long lifts buoys and their mooring anchors onto the deck. The crane can lift up to 20,000 pounds (9,100 kg).

The ships' fresh water tanks can hold 7,339 gallons. She has three ballast tanks that can be filled to maintain their trim, and tanks for oily waste water, sewage, gray water, new lubrication oil, and waste oil.

Accommodations were designed for mixed gender crews from the start. Crew size and composition has varied over the years. When she was launched, her complement was 18, commanded by a chief warrant officer. She currently has a crew of 24.

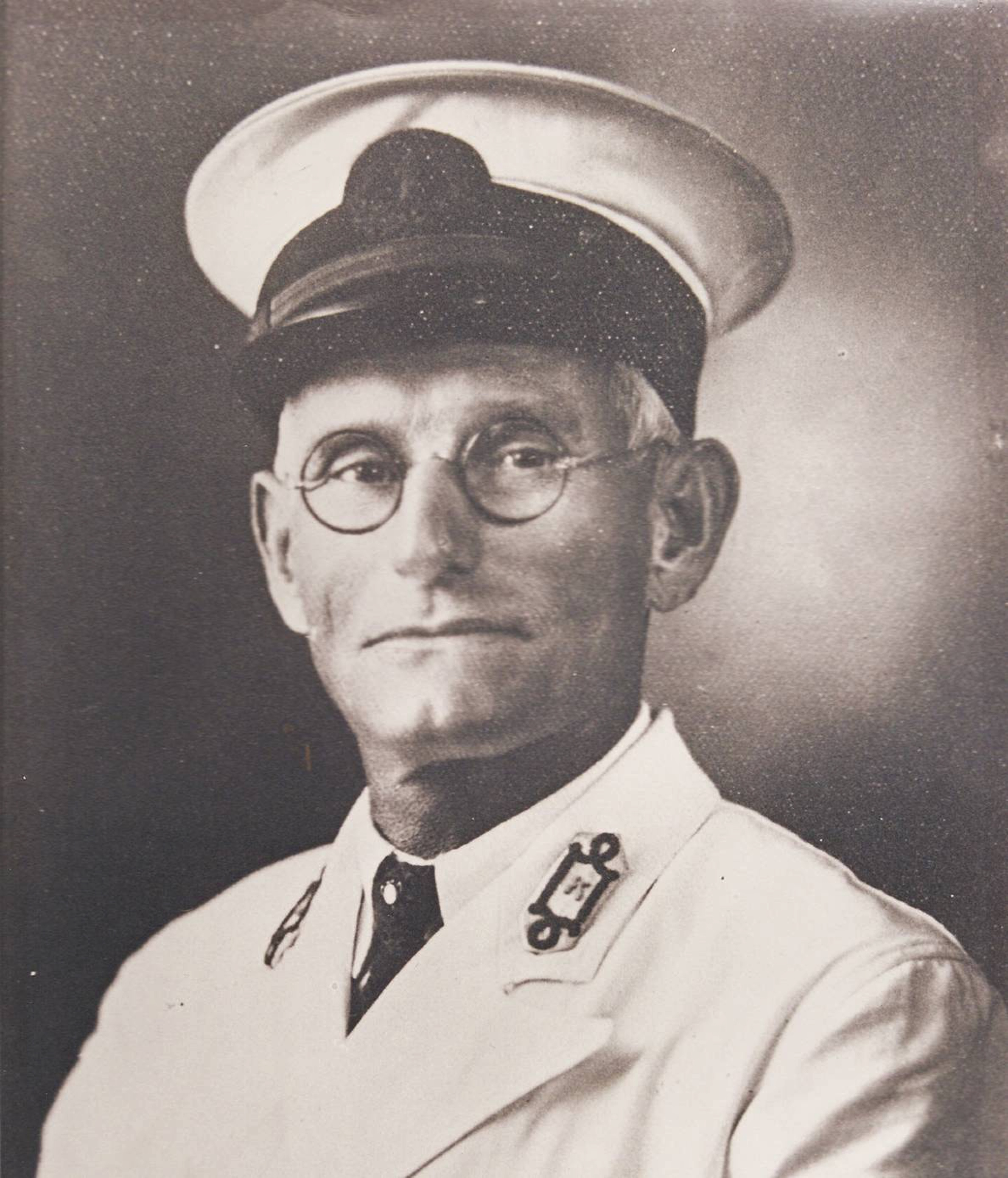
Lighthouse Keeper William J. Tate

William Tate, as all Keeper-class ships, has a strengthened "ice belt" along the waterline so that she can work on aids to navigation in ice-infested waters. Not only is the hull plating in the ice belt thicker than the rest of the hull, but framing members are closer together in areas that experience greater loads when working in ice. Higher grades of steel were used for hull plating in the ice belt to prevent cracking in cold temperatures. Her bow is sloped so that rather than smashing into ice, she rides up over it to break it with the weight of the ship. William Tate is capable of breaking flat, 9-inch thick ice at 3 knots. The ship has been called upon for ice breaking in the Delaware River when cold weather threatens commercial ship traffic.

The ship carries a cutter boat on davits. She was originally equipped with a CB-M boat which was replaced in the mid-2010s with a CB-ATON-M boat. This was built by Metal Shark Aluminum Boats and was estimated to cost $210,000. The boat is 18 feet (5.5 m) long and are equipped with a Mercury Marine inboard/outboard diesel engine.

The ship's namesake is lighthouse superintendent William J. Tate. He was responsible for maintaining the aids to navigation in Currituck Sound (including the Currituck Beach Lighthouse on the Outer Banks of North Carolina). He was first stationed at the U.S. Lighthouse Service facility on Long Point (an island on the west side of Currituck Sound). This facility was established in the 1870s as a shipping depot for the materials used to build the Currituck Beach Lighthouse. Later, an acetylene gas manufacturing plant was constructed to provide fuel for gas-fired lights on aids to navigation in the area. The maintenance facility was moved to Coinjock, NC in the 1930s after battery operated lights became the standard on aids to navigation. His area of responsibility included maintaining the aids to navigation in northeastern NC from the Virginia/North Carolina border to Albemarle Sound. He worked for the U.S. Lighthouse Service from 1915 until his retirement in 1939. Within his duties as superintendent, he was honored for assisting a number of sunken, disabled, grounded, or lost vessels. Before working with the U.S. Lighthouse Service, he gained a unique place in history as the host of the Wright Brothers in Kitty Hawk, North Carolina during their early experiments in flight.

== Operational history ==
The Coast Guard took ownership of William Tate on 16 September 1999, and placed her "in commission, special" status. To reach her new home port she sailed from Lake Michigan through the Great Lakes, and out into the Atlantic. Port calls during this voyage included Kelley's Island, Ohio, Salt Ste. Marie, Michigan, Windsor, Ontario, Buffalo and Ogdensburg, New York, Quebec City and Gaspe Bay, PQ, St. Pierre et Miquelon, Boston, and New York. After a 32-day voyage, she arrived in Philadelphia on 10 November 1999. She was placed in full commission during the Maritime Day festival at Penn's Landing in Philadelphia on 3 June 2000.

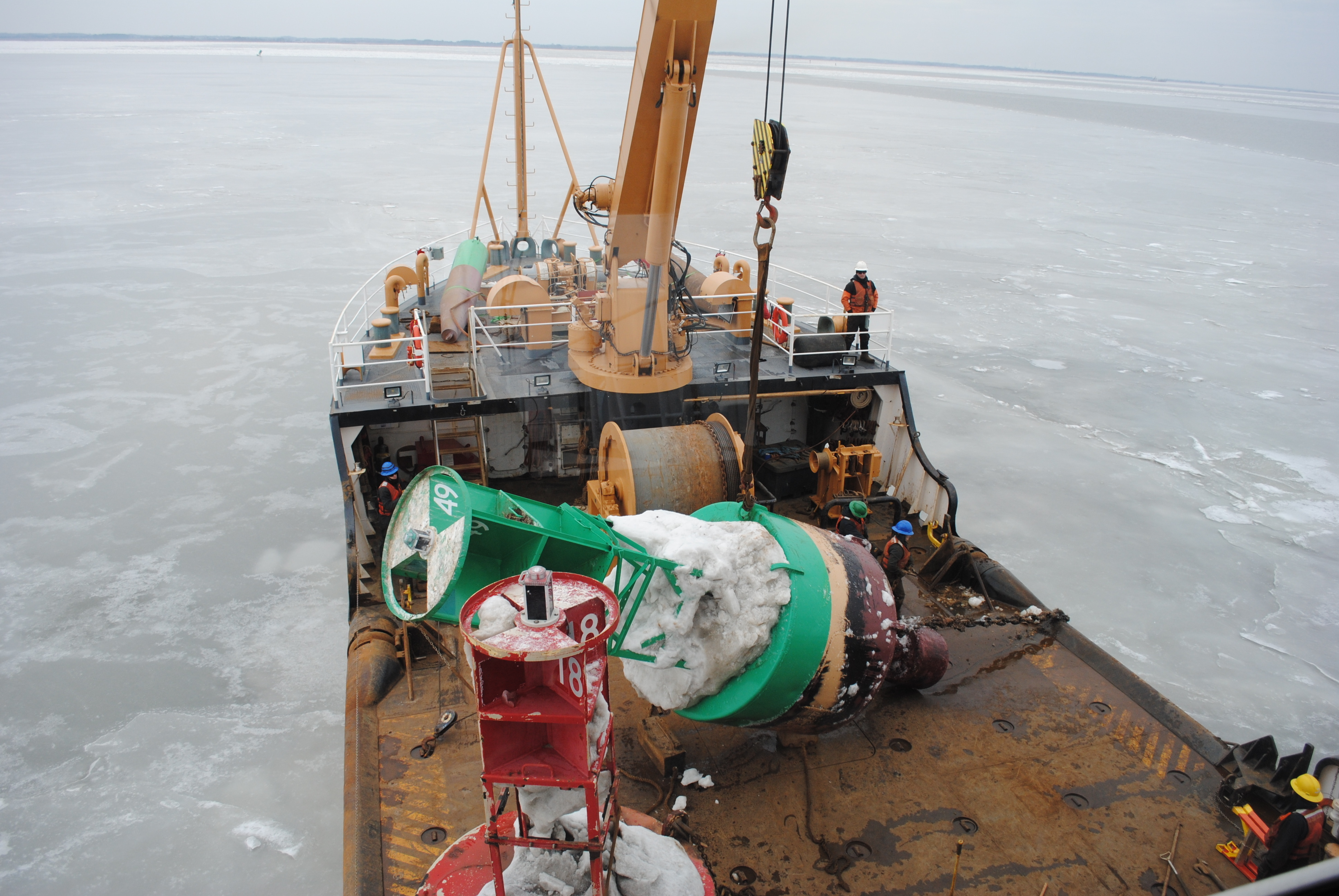
William Tate tending buoys on the frozen Delaware River

William Tate's buoy tending involves lifting them onto her deck where marine growth is scraped and pressure washed off, inspecting the buoy itself, and replacing lights, solar cells, and radar transponders. The mooring chain or synthetic cable is inspected and replaced as needed. The concrete block mooring anchor is also inspected. Ice in the rivers can damage, move, or even sink larger summer buoys, so William Tate replaces them with streamlined winter buoys in the fall, and then swaps them back in the spring.

In a ceremonial buoy placement on 25 May 2022, William Tate set the Francis Scott Key memorial buoy in the Patapsco River at the approximate location where he witnessed the bombardment of Fort McHenry which inspired the Star-Spangled Banner.

The bulk of William Tate's year is spent at sea tending its buoys, or in port maintaining the ship. She has been asked to perform other missions, as described below.

=== Search and rescue ===
In early 2012, William Tate was dispatched to perform an underwater search for the sunken fishing boat Mandy Ness.

In May 2016 she was sent to the aid of a sailboat that was taking on water off Fortescue. This effort brought the boat safely back to port.

=== Security ===
William Tate led the parade of ships and served as the floating command post for the OpSail 2000 celebration in Philadelphia.

On 18 May 2000 a portion of pier 34 on the Philadelphia waterfront housing a nightclub collapsed into the Delaware River killing three. William Tate was dispatched to prevent river traffic from approaching the collapse, and to serve as a dive platform.

After the September 11, 2001 terrorist attacks, William Tate took on an expanded security role patrolling the Delaware River.

William Tate trained with the Delaware and New Jersey State Police on 16 September 2011 in a mass evacuation scenario.

=== Public engagement ===
The Coast Guard has offered tours aboard William Tate on several occasions. These include:

- On her commissioning day in June 2000 at Penn's Landing
- On National Safe Boating Day in 2005, and 2006
- At the Cape May Coast Guard Community Festival in 2016

During May 2007, William Tate hosted 80 Navy JROTC cadets for a one day cruise as part of their training.

In May 2010, the ship hosted 47 veterans of the Battle of the Bulge on a one-day cruise.

== Awards and honors ==
William Tate was awarded the Coast Guard Unit Commendation in 2001.
