= Pokemouche, New Brunswick =

Pokemouche
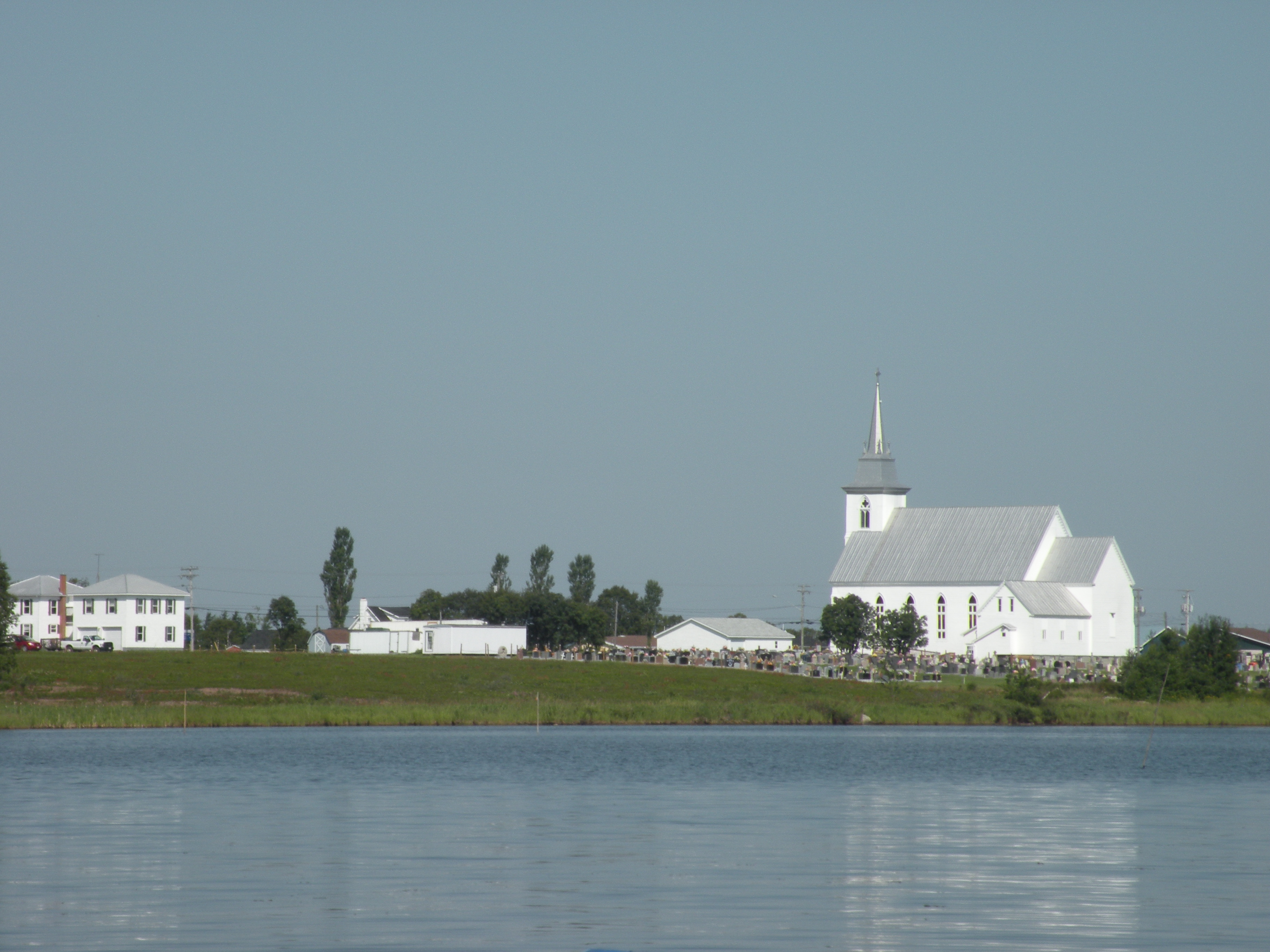
- Interactive map of Pokemouche
- Coordinates: 47.67305556°N 64.87916667°W
- Country: Canada
- Province: New Brunswick
- region: Acadian peninsula
- County: Gloucester
- Founded: 1812
- Constitution: 1984
- Founder: Gilbert Duke, John Tophem

Area
  - Total: 22.79 km^{2} (8.80 sq mi)
- Elevation: 23 m (75 ft)

Population (2011 ▲)
  - Total: 518
  - Density: 23/km^{2} (60/sq mi)
- Demonym: Pokemouchois or Pokemouchian

language
- Time zone: UTC-4 (AST)
  - Summer (DST): UTC-3 (ADT)
- Area code: +1-506
- georeference: 130110
- places of interest: Pokemouche River

Pokemouche ([pɔkmuʃ]) was a Canadian local service district in Gloucester County, in the northeast of New Brunswick, in the Acadian peninsula; it included the communities of Cowans Creek, Pokemouche, and Upper Pokemouche. It is now part of the town of Caraquet.

Despite its population of only 518 inhabitants, the LSD played an important role in transportation, the economy and culture of the region, and it was the site of several major projects.

The area around Pokemouche has been occupied for at least four thousand years by the Paleo-Indians, and for at least 3,000 years by Mi'kmaq people, who now have a settlement at the Burnt Church First Nation.

The current village was founded in 1812. Its main industry was originally forestry, but agriculture, as well as tourism centred on the Pokemouche River, now make up most of the local economy. A revival of the textile industry is also being considered.

== Etymology ==
The name "Pokemouche" comes from the Mi'kmaq language word "Pokomújpetúák" in the Francis-Smith orthography, pronounced [pokomuːtʃpetuːaːk], (Pogomu'jpetu'a'g in the Listuguj orthography, Pokomu:jpetu:a:k in the orthography of the Lexicon, Pogomotjpetoag in the Pacific orthography and Pokŭmooch'-petooāāk in the Rand orthography). According to sources this word could mean salt water entrance, many fish or ground of abundance. The name was first mentioned in 1685 with the spelling Pakmouch, on a geographical chart of the Emanuel Jumeau recollects mission, based at the time in Miramichi. This was followed by Poquemouche (Bellin, 1744 et Mitchell, 1755), Pokemushi (Jefferys, 1755, Smethurst, 1755), Bamush (DesBarres, 1778), Pockmouche (Coney, 1832 et Saunders, 1852) and Pokamouche (Gesner, 1847). The current orthography appeared in 1852 (Perley). The common name of the village used to be upper Pokemouche while the village of Inkerman was called lower Pokemouche, in reference to the respective positions of these villages along the Pokemouche River.

The name Pokemouche can apply to all of the lower valley of the river. For instance, there is the Pokemouche Airport at Village-Blanchard and the Pokemouche golf club in Landry.

== Geography ==
=== Physical Geography ===
==== Location ====
Topographic map of Pokemouche.

Pokemouche is 55 kilometres (34 mi) due east of Bathurst, on the Acadian Peninsula. The local service district covers an area of 22.79 square kilometres (8.80 sq mi).

By road, Pokemouche is 15 kilometres (9.3 mi) south of Caraquet, 35 kilometres (22 mi) southwest of Shippagan and 18 kilometres (11 mi) in the north of Tracadie-Sheila. Given its position relative to the three main cities of the peninsula, Pokemouche could be considered to be the geographical centre of the region.

The village is located on the edge of the Pokemouche River, 7 kilometres (4.3 mi) west of the Gulf of Saint Lawrence.

Pokemouche has a territory lying roughly in the shape of a north-south oriented rectangle, bordered by Six Roads to the south, by Landry to the west, Evangeline to the northeast, and Inkerman to the east. To the north, Village-Blanchard meets Pokemouche on a corner at the intersection of Basile Street and Highway 11.

The village is generally regarded as being part of Acadia.

==== Hydrography ====
The Pokemouche River passes through the village in an "S" shape, flowing in from the west and out into the north-east. The banks of the river are steep in Upper Pokemouche while the rest of the territory is rather flat. The river measures between 200 and 1000 meters wide at the level of the village. The tidal flow is perceptible up as far as Maltempeque, to the west. Walshs island is in the Pokemouche River whereas Polly island and Buckley Island lie in the southern arm of the river. The latter two in fact are connected to the mainland by marshes and all these islands are uninhabited.

In the centre of town, the South Branch Pokemouche River joins up with the right bank of the main branch. In the northeast, the Waugh River joins the Pokemouche River to form Lake Inkerman. The other waterways are, from upstream to downstream, Cowans Creek, Dukes Creek, McConnell Creek, Walshs Creek, Whalens Creek, Brook Creek, and Whittys Creek.

==== Geology ====
The subsurface of Pokemouche is made up mainly of sedimentary rocks, especially grey sandstone, dating from the Pennsylvanian era (between 300 and 311 million years). The soil around Pokemouche is better than many other places along the East coast of the province allowing for better agriculture.

==== Flora and fauna ====
Pokemouche is located in the east lowlands ecoregion, more precisely in the Caraquet ecodistrict. The long history of colonisation and disruption of the forest led to the prevalence of red maple, white poplar and gray birch. The hollows of the valleys and areas of coarse soil are covered with black spruces and jack pines, which is evidence of a high frequency of fires. There is also hemlock, cedar and tamarack larch growing in some places.

Fifteen quarries have been mined, mainly in Upper Pokemouche. Recreational fishing is done on the river but has never led to any commercial activity. The Pokemouche River Environmental Management Board has undertaken years of work for the protection of the banks as well as public awareness. In addition, the organisation plans to introduce trout and other species of fish into the river.

==== Transport ====
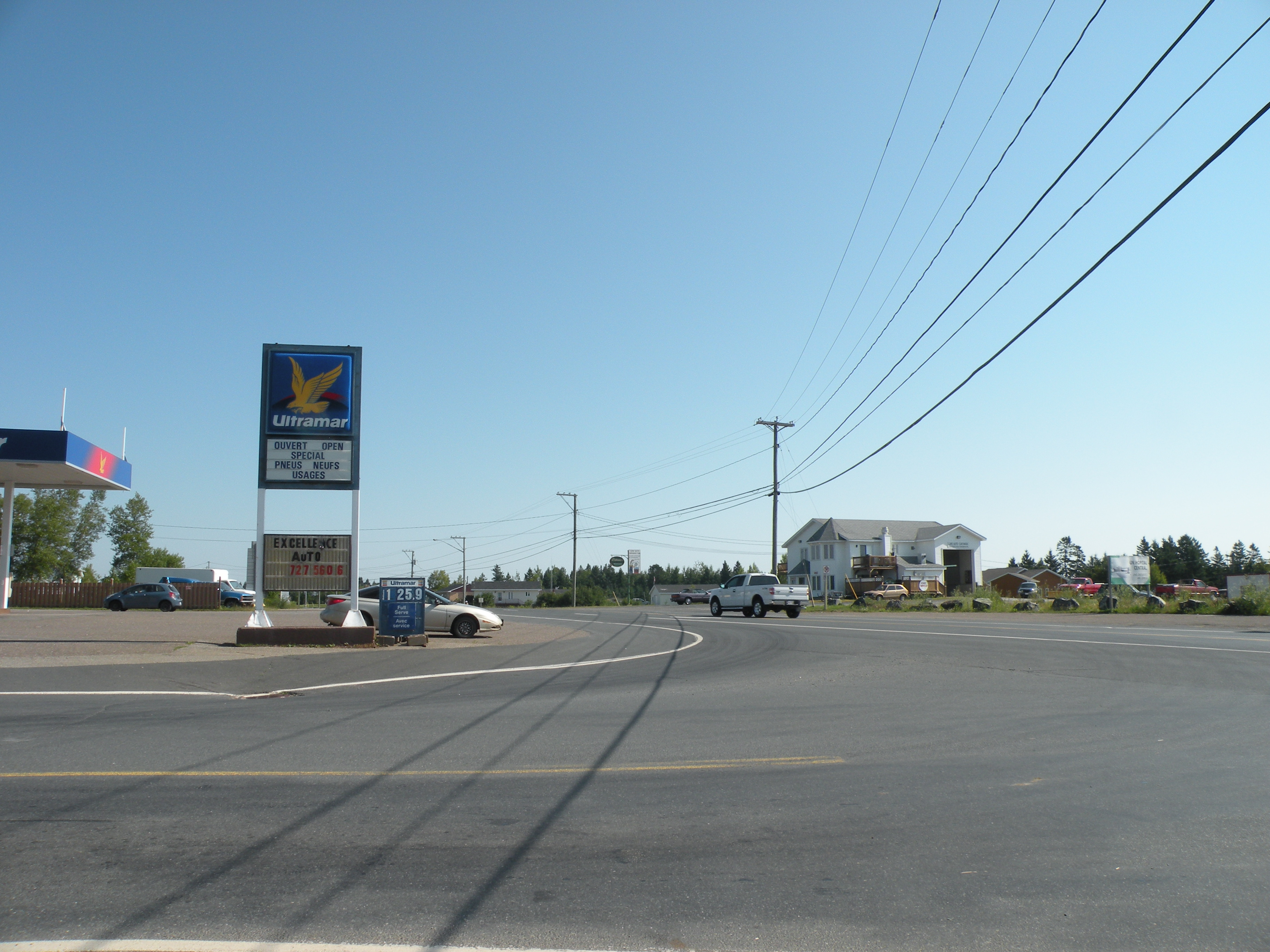
The main intersection of Pokemouche.

Halfway between the main municipalities of the peninsula, the village is located at the crossroads of Route 11, Route 113 and Route 350. Route 345 passes through the northern end of the village. The construction work of the new Route 11 linking Janeville in Pokemouche via Hautes-Terres, was scheduled to begin in 2012, at a cost of 200 million dollars

The Pokemouche river is navigable by small boats up to Maltempèque but there are no public docks.

== Demographics ==
In the 2021 Census of Population conducted by Statistics Canada, Pokemouche had a population of 535 living in 249 of its 287 total private dwellings, a change of 9.2% from its 2016 population of 490. With a land area of 22.17 km^{2} (8.56 sq mi), it had a population density of 24.1/km^{2} (62.5/sq mi) in 2021.

== Places of interest ==
- Nevins Cove
- Monroe Cove
- Polly Island
- Walshs Island
- Pokemouche Airport

== See also ==
- List of communities in New Brunswick
