= New Brunswick Route 335 =

Highway in New Brunswick, Canada

Route 335

Route information
- Maintained by New Brunswick Department of Transportation
- Length: 13.47 km (8.37 mi)

Major junctions
- North end: Route 145 in Caraquet
- South end: Route 345 in Evangeline

Location
- Country: Canada
- Province: New Brunswick
- Major cities: Caraquet, Saint-Simon

Highway system
- Provincial highways in New Brunswick; Former routes
← Route 330	→ Route 340

Route 335 or Saint-Simon Road is a 13-kilometre (8.1 mi) long, north–south secondary highway in the southeastern portion of New Brunswick, Canada.

The route's northern terminus in the community of Caraquet. The road travels south crossing the Saint-Simon River to the community of Saint-Simon. From there, the road crosses the Brideau River and ends in Evangeline without any other intersecting routes.

== River crossings ==
- Saint-Simon River
- Brideau River

== See also ==
- List of New Brunswick provincial highways
