= William Tate (lighthouse keeper) =

Capt. William J. Tate (December 1, 1869 - June 8, 1953) was the North Landing Lighthouse keeper from 1915 to 1939. He was also an aviation pioneer, having helped the Wright Brothers assemble their aircraft at Kill Devil Hill on the Outer Banks.

Tate was responsible for keeping lit a string of 42 lights stretching over 65 miles of waterway. In addition, William was also responsible for maintaining his keepers quarters. During his years of service, William J. Tate was cited frequently in the Report of the Commissioner of Lighthouses for saving lives and property, which is no small feat. In fact, he is cited so often that Coast Guard Historian Dr. Robert Browning remarked, "it is truly amazing that any one man would be cited so many times."

The citations from just his 1917 rescues read as follows:

- Tate assisted in floating the gasoline freighter that had gone ashore near his station.
- Tate saved from stranding a raft of 25,000 feet of timber, which had broken from its moorings.
- Tate floated the gasoline freighter R. C. Beaman, which had stranded near the light station."
- Tate floated the boat Muriel Dean and assisted in repairing a disabled motor boat.
- Tate floated the R. C. Beaman, which had again gone aground near the station.
- Tate piloted the yacht to harbor after it had gotten out of the channel during thick weather.
- Tate floated a yacht which had stranded in North River, and put the engine of the yacht Abeola, which had stopped at the light station, in working order.
- Tate rendered assistance to the occupants of a disabled motor boat and assisted in its repair.
- Tate rendered assistance to a party of flyers and made repairs to the aircraft.
- Tate towed to harbor a disabled motor boat.
- Tate went to the assistance of a boat that had grounded near the Light.
- Tate rendered assistance to a vessel which ran aground near North Landing River Light Station.

William's hard work did not go unnoticed. He was given over $400 in raises between 1917 and 1921 to make him one of the best-paid keepers in the United States Lighthouse Service.

William's interest in aviation continued throughout his life. Coupling his interest in flight with his duty as a lighthouse keeper, William Tate realized his dream of flying and became the first member of the Lighthouse Service to inspect lighted Aids to Navigation from an airplane. The flight was made in April, 1920. His report states: "This keeper made the trip along the river in an airplane, flying, about on a level with the lights and within 50 feet of the same, and it was easily seen whether they were burning." This eventually led to the formation of the Lighthouse Service Air Arm, which checked Aids to Navigation from the air.

He helped raise money for a flight monument in Kitty Hawk.

The USCG coastal buoy tender William Tate (WLM-560) based in Philadelphia, Pennsylvania is named after him.
