= Gulf of St. Lawrence campaign (1758) =

1758 battle

- Part of the expulsion of the Acadians
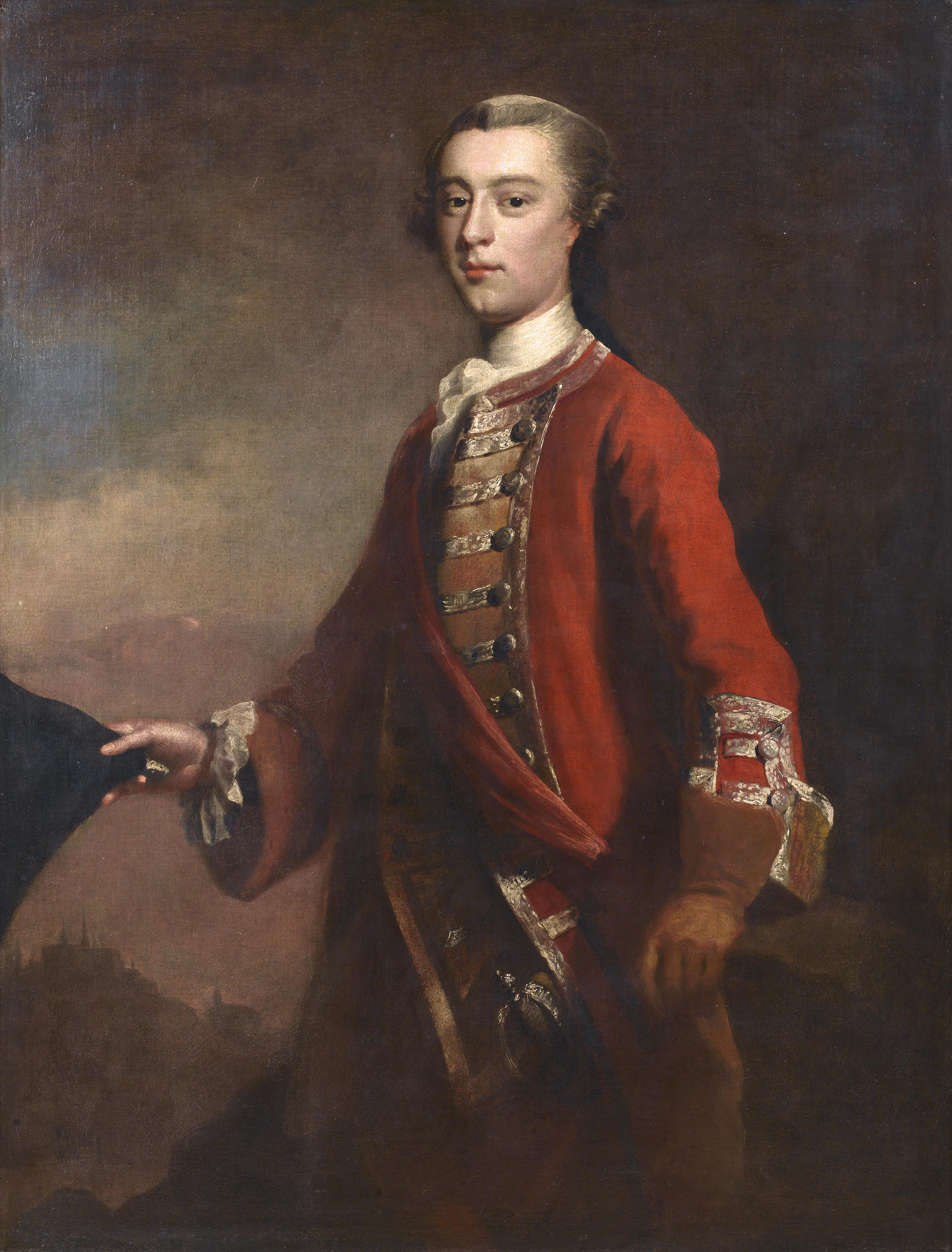
- Brigadier-General James Wolfe, British commander
| Date | September 1758 |
| Location | Gulf of St. Lawrence |
| Result | British victory |

Commanders and leaders
| James Wolfe; Charles Hardy; James Murray; Hervey Smythe; Paulus Aemilius Irving; John Dalling | Charles Deschamps de Boishébert et de Raffetot; Joseph Broussard; Father Pierre Maillard; Father Jacques Manach; Michel Mahiet (Mont-Louis); Francois LeFebvre de Bellefeuille (Grande-Rivière); Father Bonaventure Carpentier (Miramichi); Pierre Révol (Gaspe Bay) |

Units involved
| 40th Regiment of Foot | Acadia militia; Wabanaki Confederacy (Maliseet militia and Mi'kmaq militia) |

The Gulf of St. Lawrence campaign (also known as the Gaspee expedition) occurred during the French and Indian War (the North American theatre of the Seven Years' War) when British forces raided villages along present-day New Brunswick and the Gaspé Peninsula coast of the Gulf of Saint Lawrence. Sir Charles Hardy and Brigadier-General James Wolfe were in command of the naval and military forces respectively. After the siege of Louisbourg, Wolfe and Hardy led a force of 1,500 troops in nine vessels to the Gaspé Bay arriving there on September 5. From there they dispatched troops to Miramichi Bay (September 12), Grande-Rivière, Quebec and Pabos (September 13), and Mont-Louis, Quebec (September 14). Over the following weeks, Sir Charles Hardy took 4 sloops or schooners, destroyed about 200 fishing vessels and took about two hundred prisoners.

== Background ==
The siege of Port Royal happened in 1710. Over the next forty-five years some Acadians refused to sign an unconditional oath of allegiance to Britain. During this time period Acadians participated in various militia operations against the British and maintained vital supply lines to the French Fortress of Louisbourg and Fort Beausejour. During the Seven Years' War, the British sought both to neutralize any military threat Acadians posed and to interrupt the vital supply lines provided to Louisbourg by deporting Acadians from Acadia.

The first wave of deportations began in 1755 with the Bay of Fundy campaign. During the expulsion, the Saint John River valley became the center of Acadian and Algonkian resistance to the British military in the region. The leader of the resistance was French officer Charles Deschamps de Boishébert et de Raffetot. He was stationed at Sainte-Anne des Pays-Bas and from there issued orders for various raids such as the Battle of Petitcodiac (1755) and the Raid on Lunenburg (1756). He was also responsible to locate the Acadian refugees along the Saint John River.

After the siege of Louisbourg (1758), the second wave of the Expulsion of the Acadians began. Moncton was sent on the St. John River campaign and the Petitcodiac River campaign. Commander Rollo accomplished the Ile Saint-Jean campaign. Roger Morris conducted the Cape Sable campaign. Wolfe was sent on the Gulf of St. Lawrence campaign.

== Campaign ==
In the Gulf of St. Lawrence campaign, the British wanted to remove resources from the Gulf of St. Lawrence to prevent any interference with the anticipated siege of Quebec (1759). As well, the Gaspé Bay and Miramichi settlements were vital to Quebec, supplying the capital with fish.

=== Raid on Gaspé Bay ===
After participating in the siege of Louisbourg (1758), on September 5, 1758, Wolfe arrived on HMS Royal William at Gaspé Bay. At the beginning of the war the township had 300 inhabitants. By the time of the raid there were only 60. The seigneur was Pierre Revol. Sir Charles Hardy took possession of the site. The villagers fled to the woods. The summary report of the raid states that 15 houses, a sawmill and a smith's forge were destroyed. Of the sixty settlers, thirty-seven were taken on the British transports and returned to France (many of them were originally from St. Malo), while six escaped. About eighteen were unaccounted for.

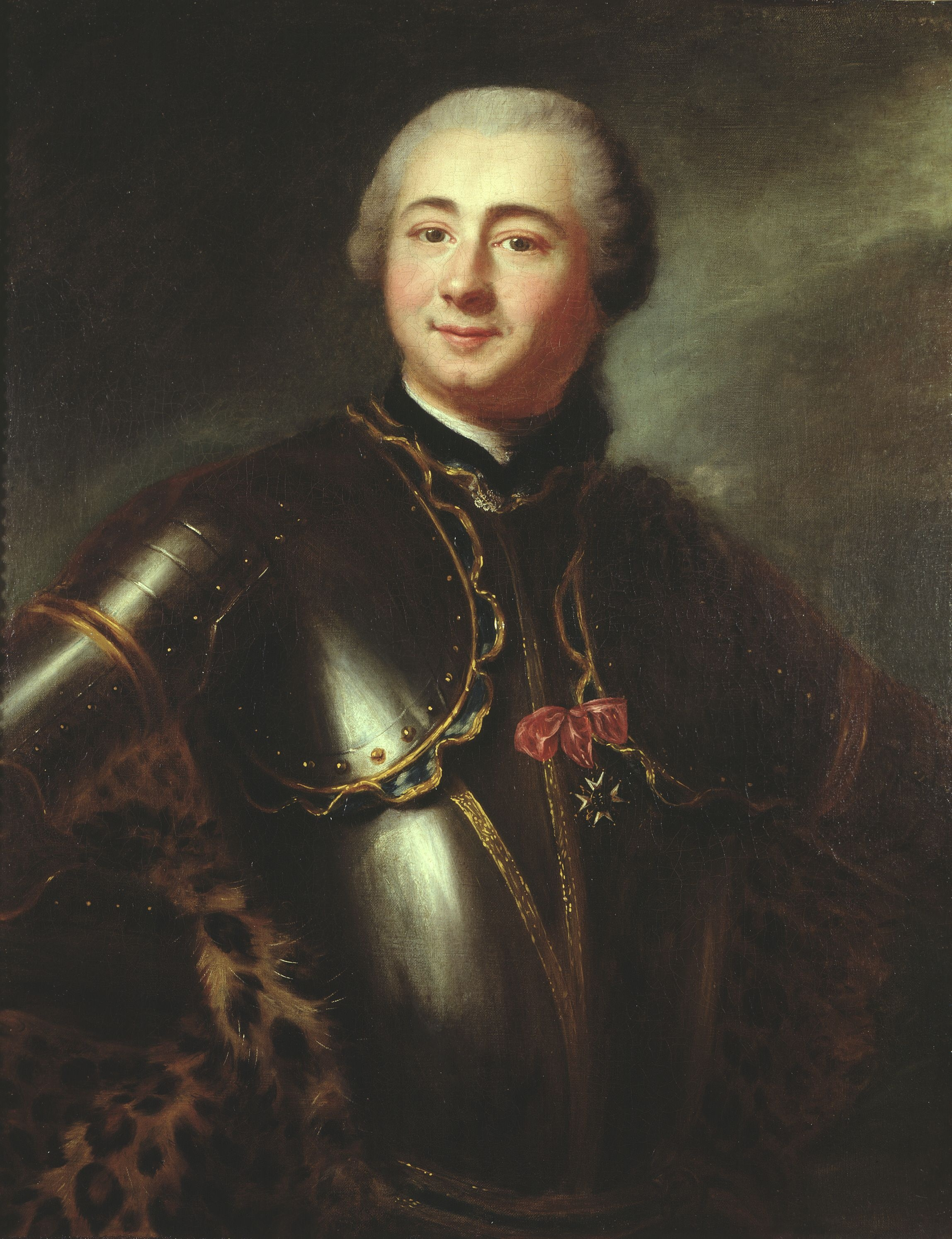
Marquis de Boishébert – Charles Deschamps de Boishébert et de Raffetot (1753)

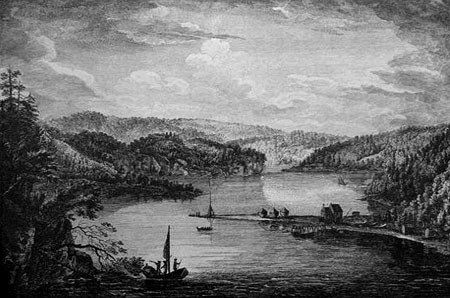
Raid on Gaspé Bay by Captain Hervey Smythe (1758)

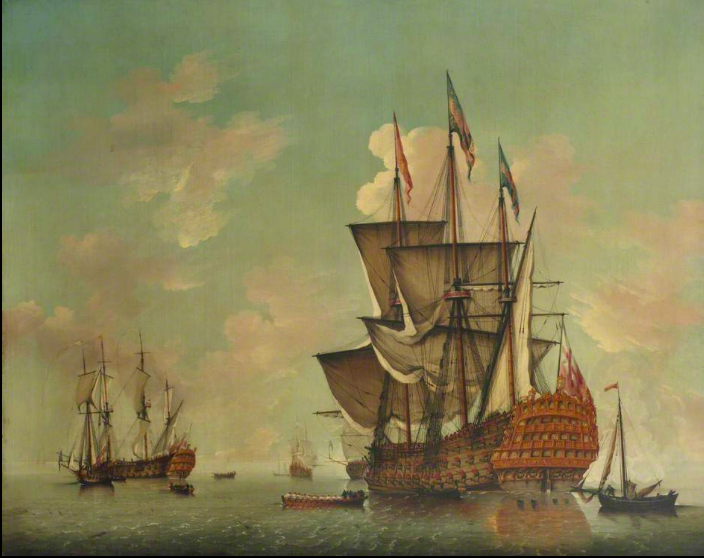
Wolfe commanded from HMS Royal William

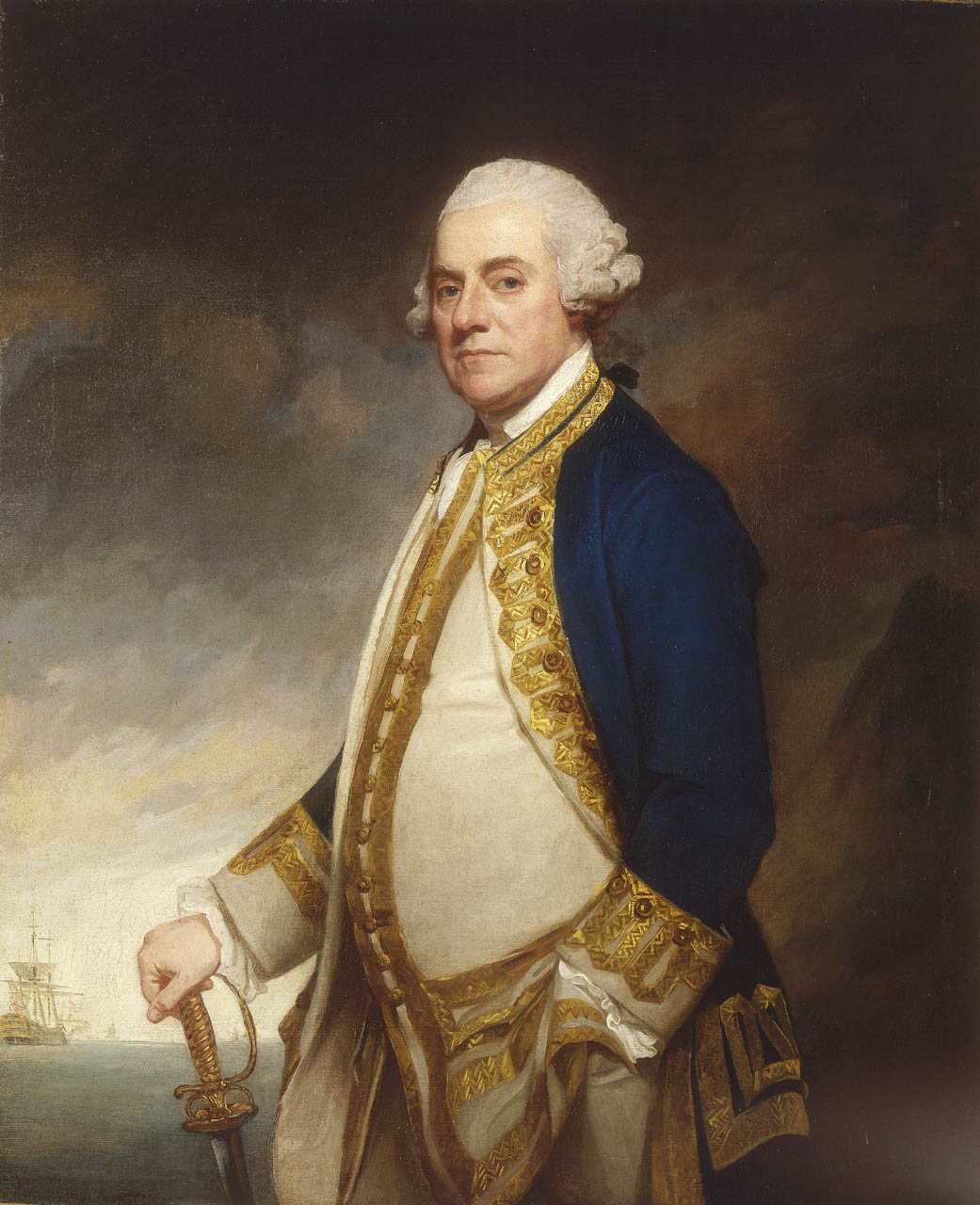
Sir Charles Hardy

=== Raid on Miramichi Bay ===
On September 15, dispatched by Wolfe at Gaspe Bay, Commander James Murray arrived under convoy of Juno with 800 troops at the mouth of Miramichi Bay. Murray's vessels got caught in the falling tide and had to wait until the tide rose before he could enter the bay. This delay gave the Acadians time to escape.

The Raid on Miramichi Bay started with an attack on present day Bay du Vin. In the village, were about 40 Acadian refugees that had fled peninsular Nova Scotia, led by Father Bonaventure.

Murray then deployed troops across Miramichi Bay to the present day community of Burnt Church. The community had about 30 families. By the time the troops arrived the Acadians had also vacated the village. Murray's troops destroyed their provisions, livestock, wigwams, houses and burned the stone church, after which the community is named.

Murray's troops were unable to travel the ten leagues (48 km) up the river to Boishebert's refugee camp, known as "Camp de l’Espérance", at Beaubears Island as their boats were too large to navigate the river. These Acadians had previously escaped the Ile Saint-Jean campaign. Murray returned to Louisbourg on September 24.

Commander James Murray

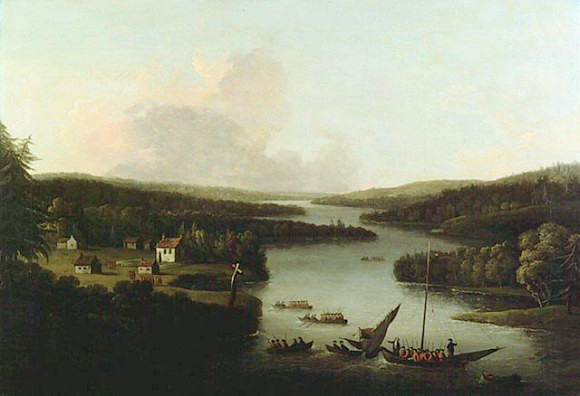
Raid on Miramichi Bay – Burnt Church Village by Captain Hervey Smythe (1758)

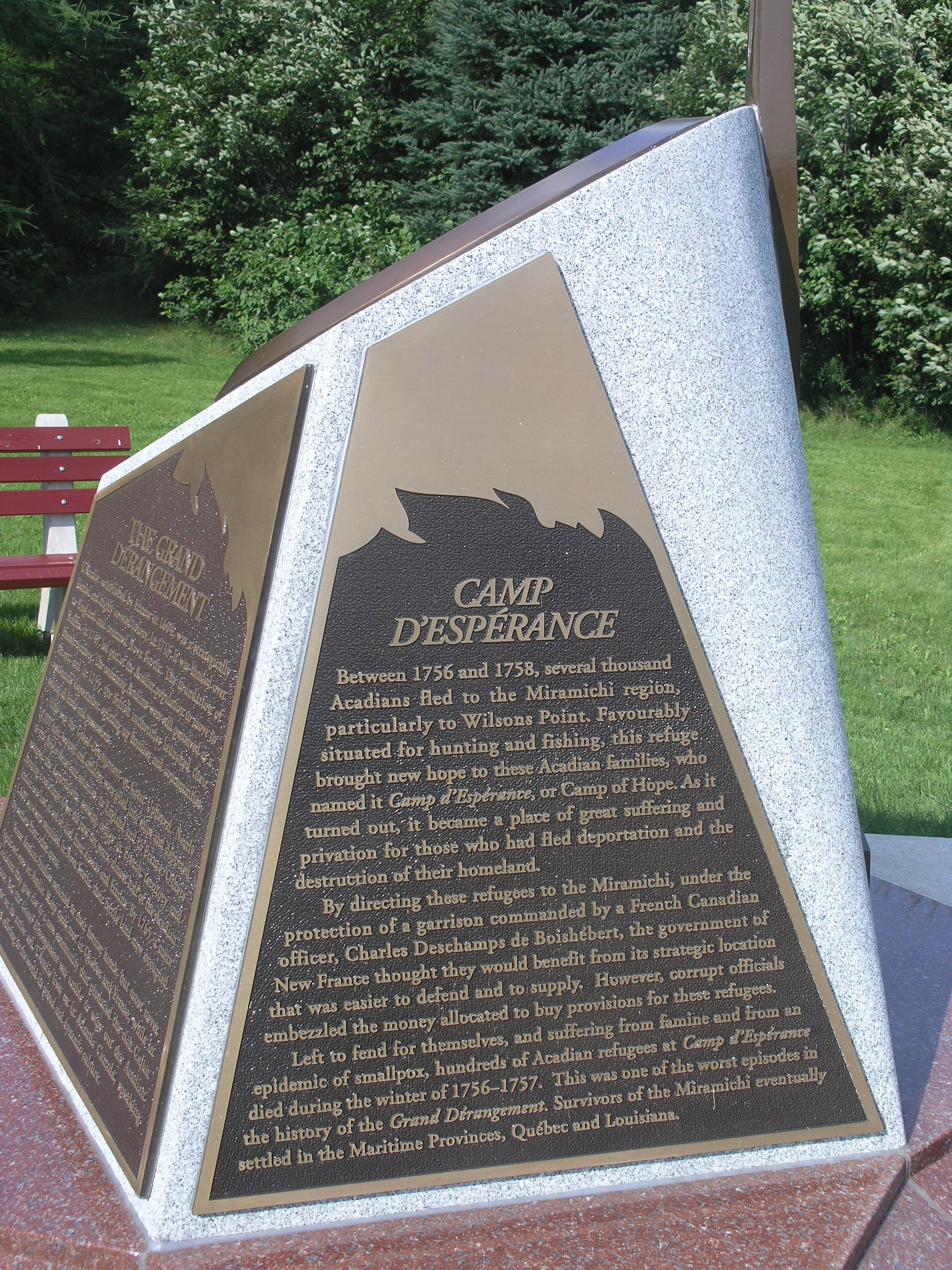
Camp d'Espérance Memorial, Beaubears Island

=== Raid on Grande-Rivière ===
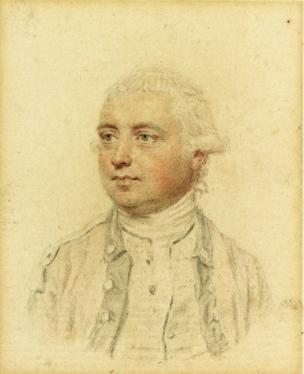
John Dalling

On September 13, Captain Paulus Irving was detached with several small parties under convoy of Kennington to Grande-Rivière, Quebec. There were 60 houses in the village and about 80 fishing vessels. The Seigneur was de Bellefeuille, who had the military title, "Commander for the King throughout the coste of Gaspée and the Bay of Chaleur." Upon the arrival of Captain Irving, the Gaspesians had already fled. All the houses and fishing vessels were burned. A man and his family along with five others were taken as prisoners.

Three leagues (14 km) west of Grande-Riviere, was the fishing hamlet of Pabos, now Chandler, Quebec. When Captain Irving arrived, the residents had already fled to the woods. De Bellefeuille's house was situated upon a little island in the Pabos River, Captain Irving had the 27 homes and 17 buildings burned along with 15 chaloupes, leaving the residents deprived of everything. Captain Irving completed the raid at the Bay de Sauvage; burning six homes and sixteen boats, and Isle Bonaventure; burning six houses and seven boats.

=== Raid on Mont-Louis ===
From Gaspe Bay, on September 14, Wolfe sent Major John Dalling to march 130 miles (210 km) along the shore up the St. Lawrence. There he reached Mont-Louis, Quebec on September 23, after marching for eleven days. Along the way they took four prisoners. The seigneur was Michel Mahiet (Maillet). When they arrived at the village they burned 16 buildings and 5 fishing vessels. Dalling managed to capture Monsieur Mahiet and his wife along with 22 men, 4 women and 14 children.

== Aftermath ==
Destroying the villages destroyed the valuable French fishery along the coast and cut off supply to Quebec, which experienced a famine that winter. The following year the British were successful in the siege of Quebec.

The Acadians also managed to continue to take refuge along the Baie des Chaleurs and the Restigouche River. Two years later the Governor of Cape Breton cautioned Lawrence about trying to remove any more of them for fear of retaliation by Mi'kmaq fighters. On the Restigouche River, Boishébert also had a refugee camp at Petit-Rochelle (which was located perhaps near present-day Pointe-à-la-Croix, Quebec). After Wolfe had left the area, the 1760 Battle of Restigouche led to the capture of several hundred Acadians at Boishébert's refugee camp at Petit-Rochelle. The following year, Pierre du Calvet made a census of the Chaleur Bay, whose purpose was to determine where and how many Acadians were hiding there. Roderick MacKenzie captured refugees, including 20 people of the 174 then in Caraquet, New Brunswick. The rest of the population emigrated to other places in the Bay of Chaleur, especially to Carleton, Quebec and Bonaventure, Quebec.
