= Pokemouche 13 =

First Nation reserve in New Brunswick, Canada

Coordinates: 47°39′00″N 64°59′00″W

Pokemouche 13 is the Statistics Canada census area designation for what is properly termed the Pokemouche Indian Reserve No. 13, located 64 km east of Bathurst, New Brunswick, Canada in Gloucester County near the community of Pokemouche. The reserve is under the jurisdiction of the Burnt Church First Nation and is 151.4 ha. in size. Nearby localities include Boudreau Road, Cowans Creek, Haut-Sainte-Rose, Landry, and Maltampec.

== See also ==
- List of communities in New Brunswick
- List of First Nations in New Brunswick
