= Esgenoôpetitj First Nation =

Esgenoôpetitj (Burnt Church)
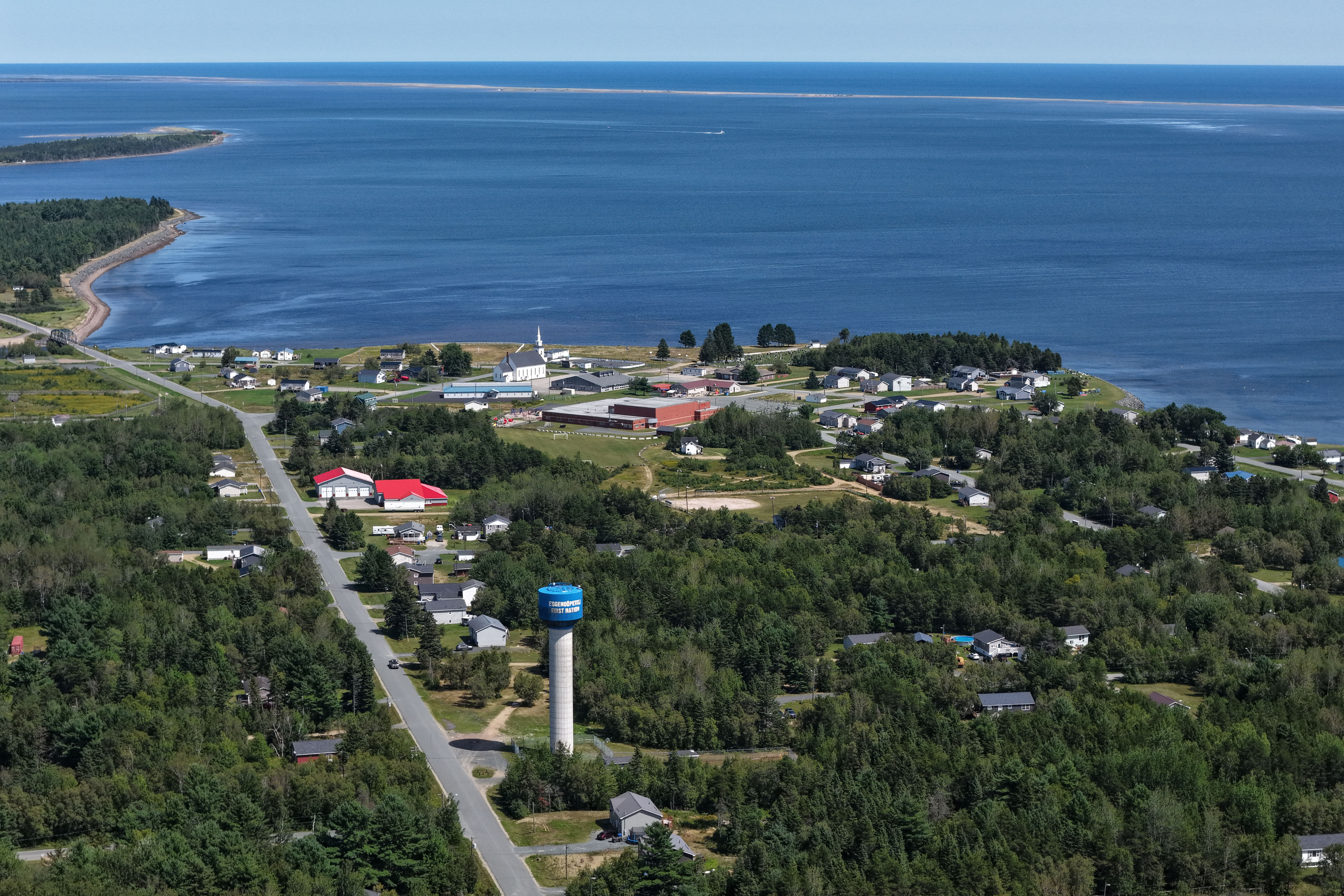
- Aerial view of Burnt Church

- Location of Esgenoôpetitj (Burnt Church) in New Brunswick
- Coordinates: 47°11′52.5″N 65°08′53.7″W
- Country: Canada
- Province: New Brunswick
- County: Northumberland County
- Established: 1802

Government
  - Chief: Alvery Paul
  - Council: List of Members: Lita Richardson; Jason Dean Barnaby; Deanna Joe; Gerald Lambert; Derek Duane Dedam; Clark Duane Dedam; Carrie Barnaby; Irene Beatrice Dedam; Lorna Paul; Billy Jack Francis; Carla Ward; Christopher Bonnell
  - MP: Jake Stewart (CPC)
  - Provincial Representatives: Réjean Savoie (PC)

Area
  - Total: 44.055 km^{2} (17.010 sq mi)
- Lowest elevation: 0 m (0 ft)

Population (2011)
  - Total: 1,715
- Time zone: UTC-4 (Atlantic (AST))
  - Summer (DST): UTC-3 (ADT)
- NTS Map: 21P3 Chatham

Esgenoôpetitj First Nation (Mi'kmaq: Sgno'p'tij), also spelled Eskɨnuopitijk and formerly known as the Burnt Church Band or Burnt Church First Nation, is a Mi'kmaq First Nation band government in New Brunswick, Canada, centred south of the community of Lagacéville (approximately 4.5 km) and southwest of the village of Neguac (approximately 7 km) on Miramichi Bay. It covers two Indian reserves in Northumberland County (Esgenoôpetitj 14, previously Burnt Church 14, and Tabusintac 9) and two reserves in Gloucester County (Pokemouche 13) (Pabineau). The population was 1,715 as of 2011. The Mi'kmaq call Burnt Church Esgenoôpetitj, which means "a lookout".

== History ==
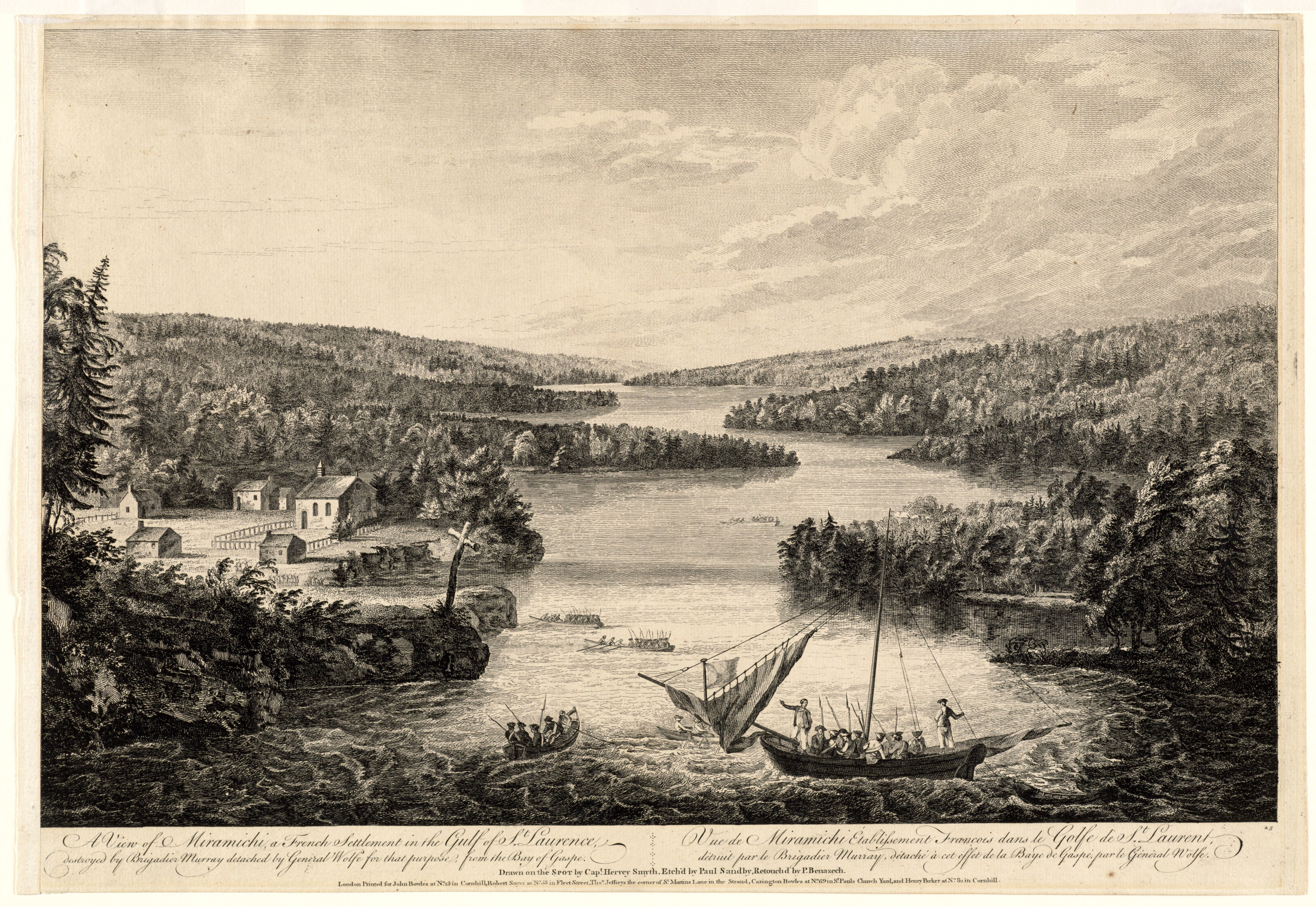
Burnt Church, 1758. "A view of Miramichi, a French settlement in the Gulf of St. Laurence, destroyed by Brigadier Murray detached by General Wolfe for that purpose, from the Bay of Gaspe."

The land has been inhabited by First Nations peoples since at least 1727, when a map by Sieur l'Hermitte recorded it.

William Francis Ganong explained that the current name arose after the 1758 Gulf of St. Lawrence Campaign (1758), when British General James Wolfe directed Colonel James Murray to destroy the Acadian settlements of Miramichi which included burning the stone church.

Burnt Church was included in one of the very earliest Indian reserves set aside by New Brunswick. The reserve was officially established March 5, 1805, with 2,058 acres (8.33 km^{2}). At the time of Ganong's writing it was "still a favorite Micmac settlement, and much the largest in all New Brunswick".

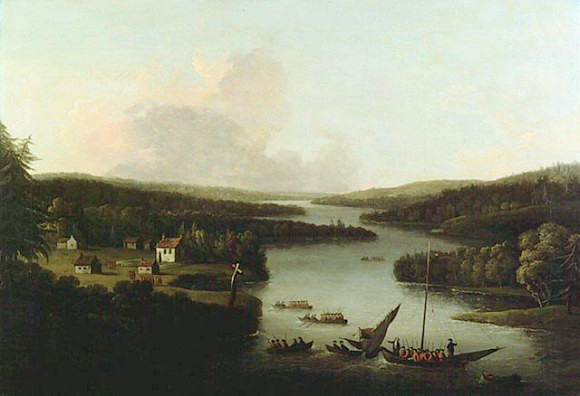
Raid on Miramichi Bay - Burnt Church Village by Captain Hervey Smythe (1758)

Following the Seven Years' War, several Acadian families returned to lands adjoining the reserve. They were followed by a wave of new Scottish settlers. Thus, the Burnt Church name is now used in reference to both the local First Nation, and to the adjoining non-native community.

In recent years, Esgenoôpetitj First Nation members have fought strenuously for their traditional lobster fishing rights, culminating in the Burnt Church Crisis with the provincial and federal governments as well as local non-native fishermen.

== See also ==
- List of communities in New Brunswick
- First Nations in New Brunswick
