= Hervey Smythe =

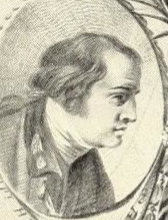
Capt Hervey Smythe

Sir Hervey Smythe (1734–1811) was a British army officer and a topographical painter. He fought alongside James Wolfe during the Gulf of St. Lawrence Campaign (1758) and is pictured holding his right arm in the historic Benjamin West painting The Death of General Wolfe. Hervey made his own portrait of Wolfe at Quebec.

Baronetage of Great Britain
Preceded by Robert Smyth	Baronet (of Isfield); 1783–1811	Extinct
