= New Brunswick Route 310 =

Highway in New Brunswick, Canada

Route 310

Route information
- Maintained by New Brunswick Department of Transportation
- Length: 6.92 km (4.30 mi)

Major junctions
- East end: Route 113
- West end: Route 305 near Grand Etang

Location
- Country: Canada
- Province: New Brunswick
- Major cities: Coteau Road

Highway system
- Provincial highways in New Brunswick; Former routes
← Route 305	→ Route 313

Route 310 is a 7 km (4.3 mi) east–west secondary highway in the northeast Canadian province of New Brunswick.

The route's eastern terminus is near the centre of Lameque Island. The route (named Rue des Cedres) travels east to the town of Coteau Road. From here, the highway takes a sharp turn north towards Grand Etang and it ends at Route 305

== See also ==
- List of New Brunswick provincial highways
