= Gaspé Bay =

Bay in Quebec, Canada

Coordinates: 48.767°N 64.289°W

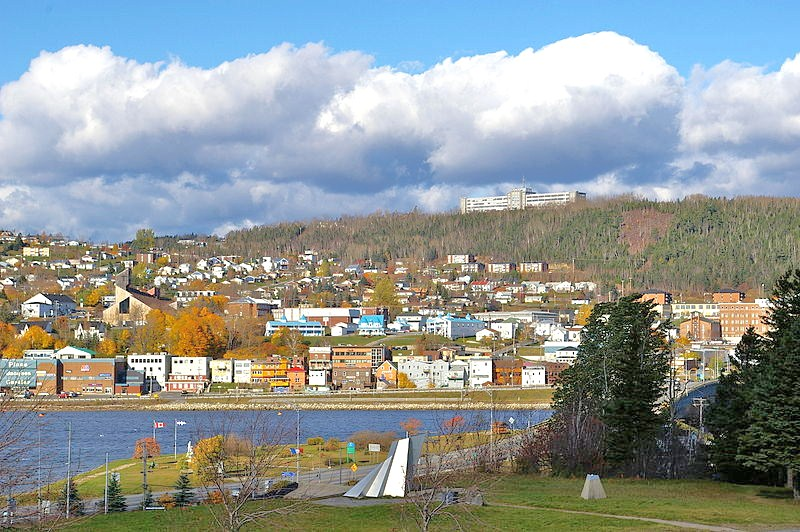
Gaspé Bay

Gaspé Bay (French: Baie de Gaspé) is a bay of the Gulf of St. Lawrence, located on the northeast coast of the Gaspé Peninsula, Gaspésie-Îles-de-la-Madeleine region, Quebec, Canada.

== History ==
Gaspé Bay is where Jacques Cartier took possession of New France (now part of Canada) in the name of François I of France on July 24, 1534 – the beginning of France's overseas expansion.

British General James Wolfe raided the Bay in the Gulf of St. Lawrence Campaign (1758), the year before the Siege of Quebec.

Marine fauna in Gaspé Bay, overview

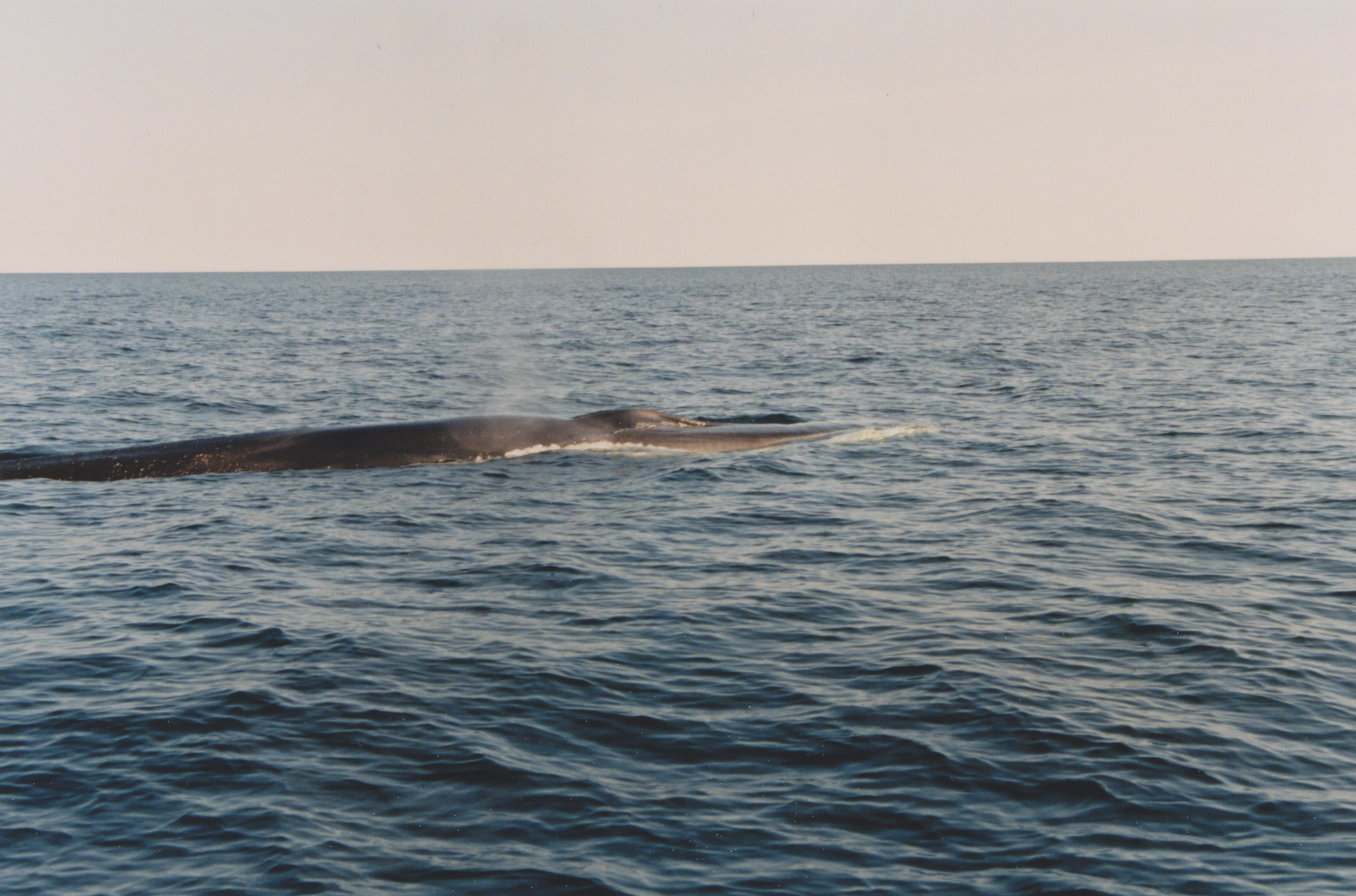
Whale, expedition organized by Observation littoral Percé (1995)

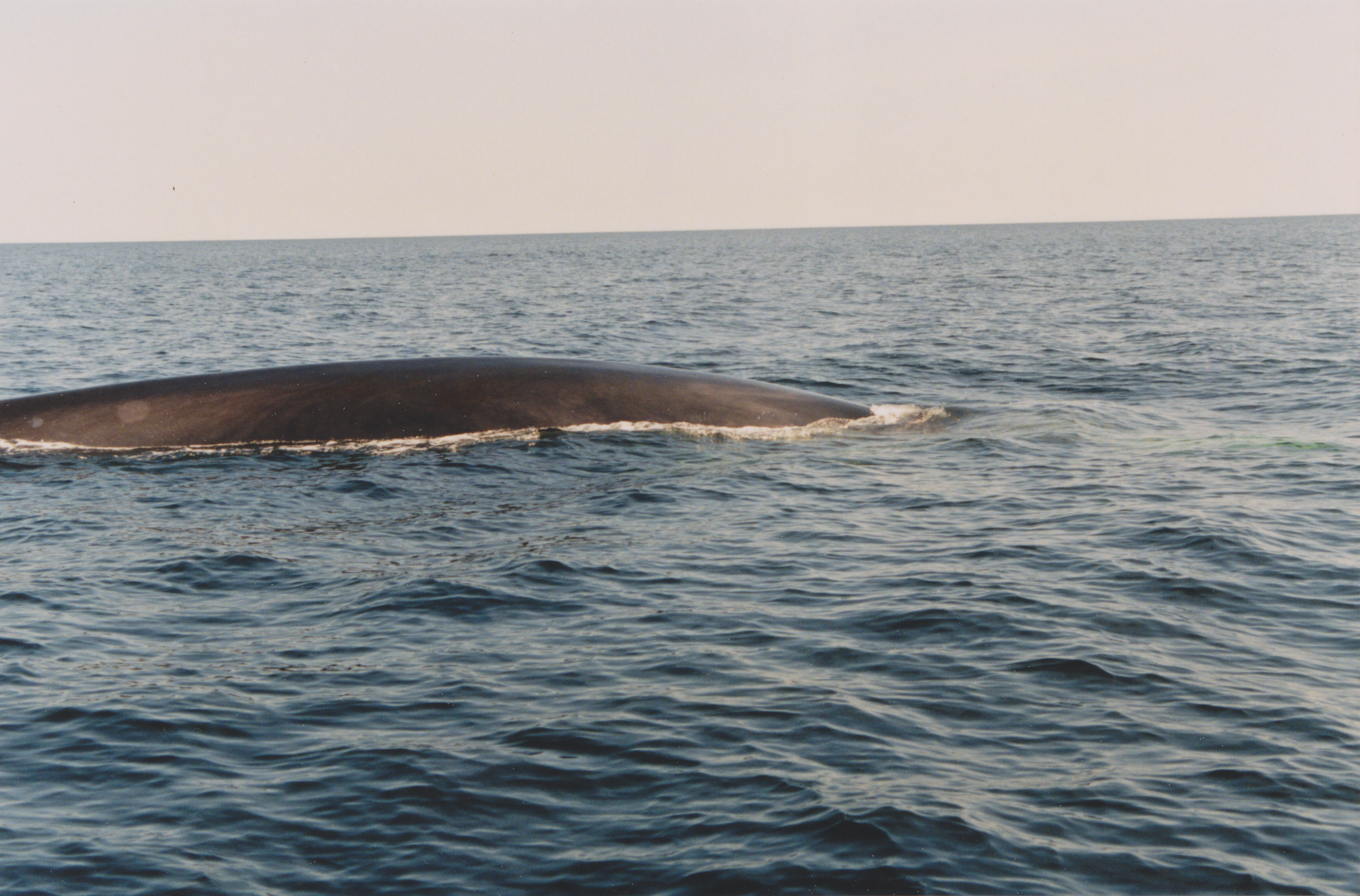
Whale, expedition organized by Observation littoral Percé (1995)

Paleobotanical fossils and trace fossils of Archaeognatha from the Devonian period have been found on the bay's shores.

The town of Gaspé, Quebec lies on a part of its southern shore, while most of its northern shore is in the Forillon National Park. The main rivers draining to the bay are the Dartmouth River and the York River (the latter one has its mouth in the city center of Gaspé).
