= Inkerman, New Brunswick =

Community in New Brunswick, Canada

Coordinates: 47.667671°N 64.824786°W

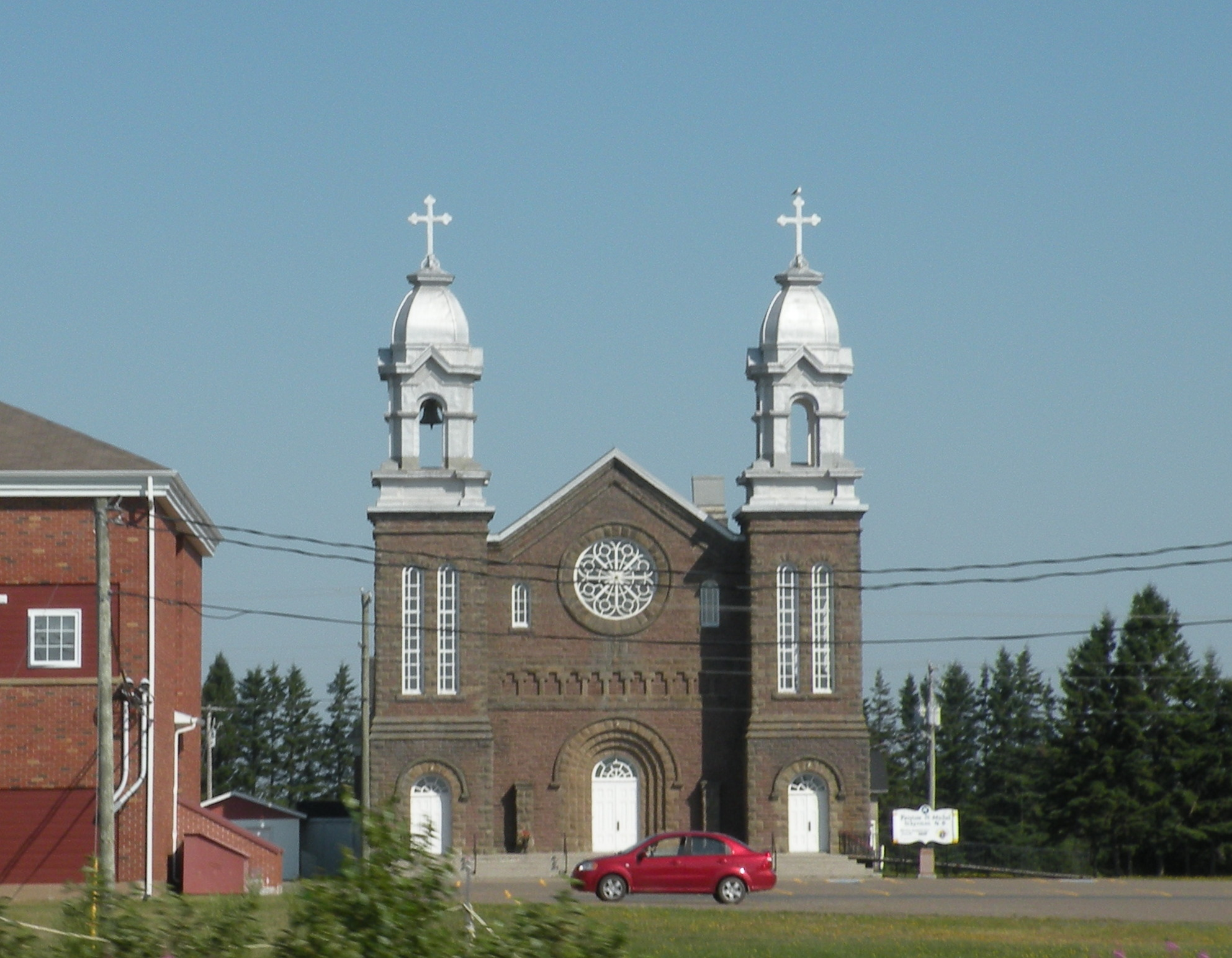
Saint-Michel-Archange Roman Catholic church in Inkerman, New Brunswick, Canada

Inkerman is a community in the Canadian province of New Brunswick on Inkerman Lake. It is located mainly on Route 113.

== History ==
The place is named after the Battle of Inkerman in the Crimean War.

The area was once served by the Caraquet and Gulf Shore Railway, a section of which ran between Tracadie and Shippagan. In 2017, a 500 metre former railway bridge, then being used as part of the Sentier NB Trail, was destroyed by fire.

== Demographics ==
In the 2021 Census of Population conducted by Statistics Canada, Inkerman had a population of 712 living in 321 of its 344 total private dwellings, a change of 10.9% from its 2016 population of 642. With a land area of 24.19 km^{2} (9.34 sq mi), it had a population density of 29.4/km^{2} (76.2/sq mi) in 2021.

== See also ==
- Inkerman Parish
- List of communities in New Brunswick
