= Ballencrief Toll =

Coordinates: 55.914°N 3.640°W

Ballencrieff Toll: Scottish Gaelic: Baile na Craoibhe
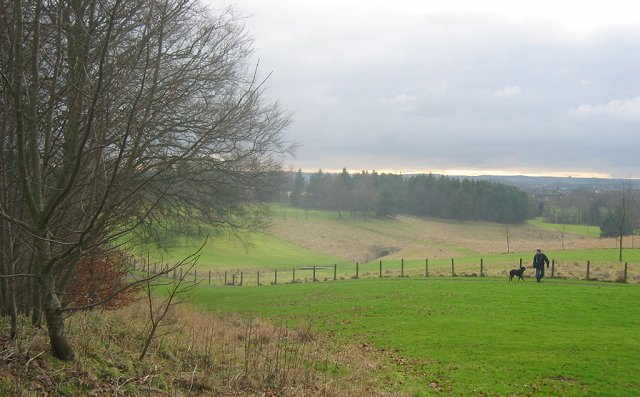
- Part of Balbardie Park of Peace

- Location within West Lothian
- OS grid reference: NS975701
- Civil parish: Bathgate
- Council area: West Lothian
- Lieutenancy area: West Lothian
- Country: Scotland
- Sovereign state: United Kingdom
- Post town: BATHGATE
- Postcode district: EH48
- Dialling code: 01506
- Police: Scotland
- Fire: Scottish
- Ambulance: Scottish
- UK Parliament: Bathgate and Linlithgow
- Scottish Parliament: Linlithgow

Ballencrief Toll is a settlement in West Lothian, Scotland. It lies just beyond the northern edge of the town of Bathgate, on the B792 road towards Torphichen.

The area is marked on some maps as Ballencrieff (not to be confused with the Ballencrieff village in East Lothian). The name means "the farm by the tree", from Baile na Craoibhe. From around 1768 until 1880, the abundant limestone was processed locally in kilns to make quicklime.

Immediately south-west of Ballancrieff Toll is the park which surrounded Balbardie House, a grand mansion built in the late 18th century for the influential Marjoribanks family, and demolished between 1954 and 1975. This is now Balbardie Park of Peace, which has a nine-hole golf course and sports facilities including a swimming pool, all run by the non-profit company West Lothian Leisure under their Xcite brand.

A property with two small reservoirs, about half a mile to the north-east, has holiday accommodation and venues for events and weddings.
