= Sainte-Marie-Saint-Raphaël =

Sainte-Marie-Saint-Raphaël Ste-Marie-St-Raphaël
- Location within New Brunswick
- Coordinates: 47°47′N 64°34′W
- Country: Canada
- Province: New Brunswick
- County: Gloucester
- Parish: Shippagan
- Town: Île-de-Lamèque
- Incorporated: May 12, 1986

Area
  - Land: 15.84 km^{2} (6.12 sq mi)

Population (2021)
  - Total: 820
  - Density: 51.8/km^{2} (134/sq mi)
  - Change (2016–21): ▼6.7%
  - Dwellings: 433
- Time zone: UTC-4 (AST)
  - Summer (DST): UTC-3 (ADT)
- Postal code(s): E8T
- Area code: 506
- Highways: Route 305
- Website: www.ste-marie-st-raphael.ca

Sainte-Marie-Saint-Raphaël (French pronunciation: [sɛ̃t maʁi sɛ̃ ʁafaɛl]; unofficially Ste-Marie-St-Raphaël) is a former village in Gloucester County, New Brunswick, Canada. It held village status prior to 2023 and is now part of the town of Île-de-Lamèque.

Located on Lamèque Island, the village was formed by the incorporation of most of the local service district (LSD) of St. Raphael sur-Mer and a small part of the neighbouring LSD of Haut-Lamèque. Contrary to frequent citation, it was not formed by an amalgamation involving a village named Sainte-Marie.

== History ==
In May 1971, an anxious Acadian fishing population demanded a public hearing into the safety of the Marc Guylaine, and 400 people met at the Saint-Raphaël community centre where an "action group" was commissioned to study the issue. Ultimately the last of the "cursed" sister ships was found to be unseaworthy.

On 1 January 2023, Sainte-Marie-Saint-Raphaël amalgamated with the town of Lamèque and all or part of ten local service districts to form the new town of Île-de-Lamèque. The community's name remains in official use.

== Demographics ==
Historical Census Data - Sainte-Marie-Saint-Raphaël, New Brunswick
Year	Pop.	±%
1991	1,201	—
1996	1,185	−1.3%
2001	1,135	−4.2%
2006	993	−12.5%
2011	955	−3.8%
2016	879	−8.0%
2021	820	−6.7%

In the 2021 Census of Population conducted by Statistics Canada, Sainte-Marie-Saint-Raphaël had a population of 820 living in 395 of its 433 total private dwellings, a change of −6.7% from its 2016 population of 879. With a land area of 15.84 km^{2} (6.12 sq mi), it had a population density of 51.8/km^{2} (134.1/sq mi) in 2021.

Canada census – Sainte-Marie-Saint-Raphaël community profile

	2021	2011
Population	820 (-6.7% from 2016)	955 (-3.8% from 2006)
Land area	15.84 km^{2} (6.12 sq mi)	15.61 km^{2} (6.03 sq mi)
Population density	51.8/km^{2} (134/sq mi)	61.2/km^{2} (159/sq mi)
Median age	56.8 (M: 56, F: 58.4)	48.5 (M: 48.2, F: 49.0)
Private dwellings	395 (total)	443 (total)
Median household income		$41,422

References: 2021 2011

=== Language ===
Canada Census Mother Tongue - Sainte-Marie-Saint-Raphaël, New Brunswick
Census	Total	French			English			French & English			Other		
Year	Responses	Count	Trend	Pop %	Count	Trend	Pop %	Count	Trend	Pop %	Count	Trend	Pop %
2011	960	940	▼3.1%	97.92%	15	▼25.0%	1.56%	5	▲ n/a%	0.52%	0	0.0%	0.00%
2006	990	970	▼13.8%	97.98%	20	▲100.0%	2.02%	0	0.0%	0.00%	0	0.0%	0.00%
2001	1,135	1,125	▼4.3%	99.12%	10	0.0%	0.88%	0	▼100.0%	0.00%	0	0.0%	0.00%
1996	1,195	1,175	n/a	98.33%	10	n/a	0.84%	10	n/a	0.84%	0	n/a	0.00%

== See also ==
- List of communities in New Brunswick
