= Miscou Island Lighthouse =

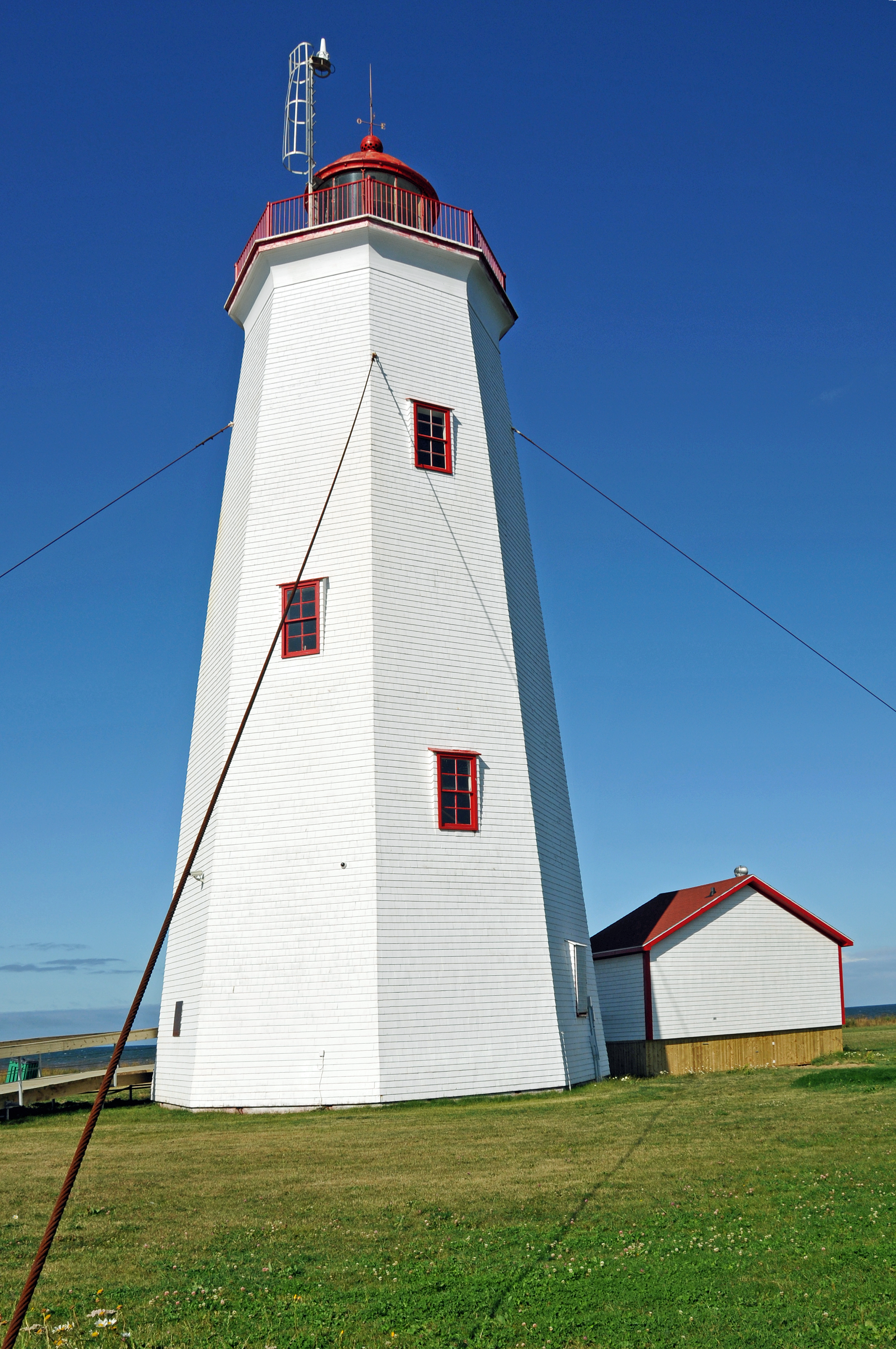
- Location: North-East Tip of Miscou Island; North-East terminus of Route 113; Gloucester County; New Brunswick; Canada
- Coordinates: 48°00′33.6″N 64°29′34.7″W

Tower
- Constructed: 1856 (first)
- Construction: wooden tower
- Height: 24.3 metres (80 ft)
- Shape: octagonal tower with balcony and lantern
- Markings: white tower and gallery, red lantern and trim
- Operator: Développement Touristique de Miscou
- Heritage: recognized federal heritage building of Canada, national Historic Sites of Canada, provincial heritage place

Light
- First lit: 1930s (current)
- Focal height: 14 metres (46 ft)
- Range: 12 nautical miles (22 km; 14 mi)
- Characteristic: Fl G 5s.

Miscou Island Lighthouse is an 24.3-metre (80 ft)-tall landfall lighthouse located on the North-Eastern tip of Miscou Island, at the entrance of the Chaleur Bay. It was built in 1856 and currently in use by the Canadian Coast Guard who owns the lighthouse, the land it is on, and also maintains it. It was built due to the shipwrecks that happened each year that could be prevented by a lighthouse. James Murray from Newcastle won the bid to construct the lighthouse. It is a federal Heritage Building that is open to the public to explore. In 2009 a parking area, washrooms, picnic area and a deck around the lighthouse was added.

The light's characteristic is a single green flash that occurs every five seconds, emitted at a focal plane height of 14 metres (46 ft). It has a third-order Fresnel lens. The original lens was shipped from England and arrived on October 10, 1856, and the person in charge of the only other lighthouse on the northern coast of New Brunswick, William Hay, was sent to oversee the installation.

Smoke conductors were installed in 1860 because the calm weather could not sufficiently clear the smoke from the lantern room. In 1874 a building was built which contained a steam fog whistle that had blasts of 5 seconds that were separated by 25 seconds of silence.

In 1946 the lighthouse was moved 200 feet inland.

== Light Keepers ==
Light Keepers	Years active
George McConnell	1855–1877
Robert Rivers	1877–1902
Joseph L. Robichaud	1902–1912
John A. Ward	1912–1940
John Lester Marks	1940–1957
Arthur Chiasson	1957–1983
Robert Chiasson	1984–1988

== See also ==
- List of lighthouses in New Brunswick
- List of lighthouses in Canada
