= New Brunswick Route 113 =

Highway in New Brunswick

Route 113

Route information
- Maintained by New Brunswick Department of Transportation
- Length: 57.86 km (35.95 mi)
- Existed: 1965–present

Major junctions
- South end: Route 11 / Route 350 in Pokemouche
- North end: Miscou Island Lighthouse

Location
- Country: Canada
- Province: New Brunswick
- Major cities: Shippagan, Lameque

Highway system
- Provincial highways in New Brunswick; Former routes
← Route 112	→ Route 114

Route 113 is a highway in the Canadian province of New Brunswick; which serves as the only highway link from the town of Shippagan and the islands off the northeast coast of the Acadian Peninsula to the mainland. The route begins at Route 11 exit 217 in Pokemouche, and ends at Birch Point at the northern tip of Miscou Island, a distance of 57.9 kilometres. Communities along the route include Inkerman, Shippagan and Lamèque.

In Shippagan, the route forms parts of Première rue, J. D. Gauthier Boulevard Est, and 17e rue. In the Town of Lamèque, it forms rue du Pêcheur nord.

Prior to the opening of a bridge in 1997, Miscou Island was served only by a ferry service from Île de Lamèque. Route 113 was then realigned in 1999 to provide a more direct connection from the town of Lamèque to the bridge. The former routing, which served several communities on the western shore of the island, is now Route 313.

== See also ==
- List of New Brunswick provincial highways
