= Pokemouche River =

River in New Brunswick, Canada

Coordinates: 47°40′6.3″N 64°53′15.6″W

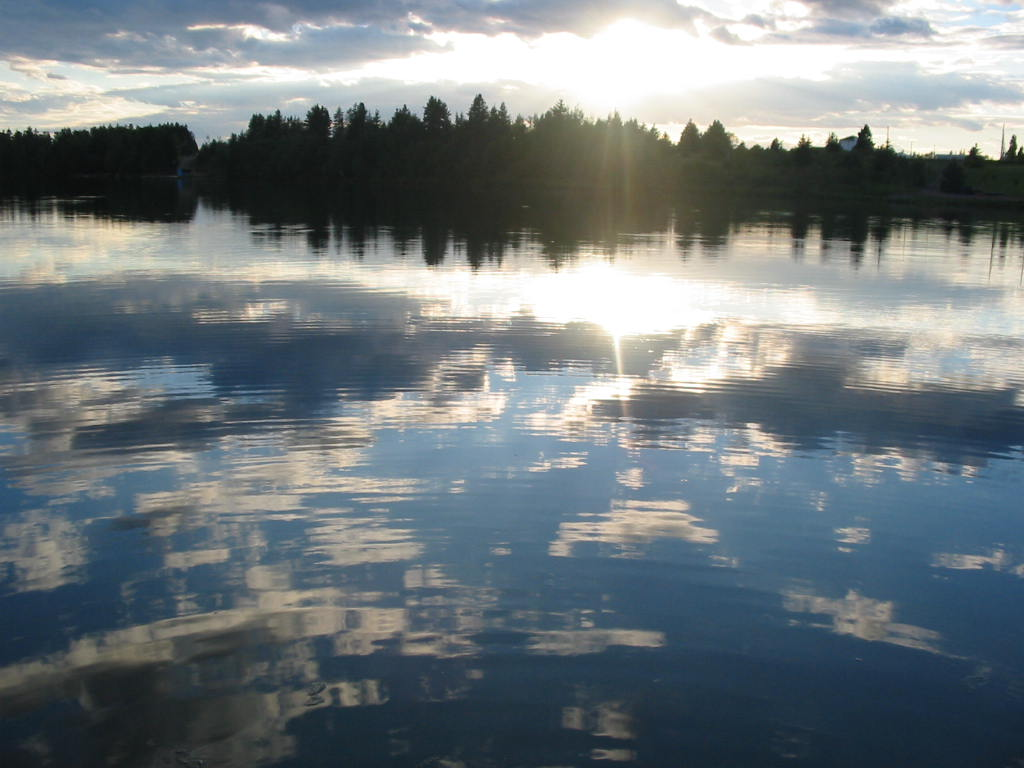
Pokemouche River

The Pokemouche River is in north eastern New Brunswick, Canada. The name is derived from the Algonquin language. Its headwaters are near the town of Hautes-Terres, and it flows in an easterly direction approximately twenty kilometers where it empties into the Gulf of St. Lawrence at Inkerman Lake. Other communities along its watershed include Maltampec and Pokemouche. Its tributaries include South Branch Pokemouche River, Cowans Creek, and the Waugh River.

== See also ==
- List of rivers of New Brunswick
