= Robertville, New Brunswick =

Robertville
- Unincorporated community
- Location within New Brunswick.
- Coordinates: 47.697778°N 65.765833°W
- Country: Canada
- Province: New Brunswick
- County: Gloucester
- Parish: Beresford
- Electoral Districts Federal: Acadie—Bathurst
- Provincial: Restigouche-Chaleur

Government
  - Type: Local service district
- Time zone: UTC-4 (AST)
  - Summer (DST): UTC-3 (ADT)
- Postal code(s): E8K
- Area code: 506
- Highways: Route 322

Robertville is an unincorporated community and former local service district in Gloucester County, New Brunswick, Canada.

Situated northwest of the outskirts of Bathurst, it is mostly surrounded by forest. Among other communities in the surroundings are Beresford, Petit Rocher, Nigadoo, North Tetagouche, South Tetagouche, Pointe Verte, and Rough Waters.

== Education ==
The elementary school of Robertville is École La Croisée de Robertville ("La Croisée" is French for "The Crossing", referring to the four corners intersection where the school is situated and was named by a student (Jason Mansour) after he won a contest to find the school a name).
French speaking people from Robertville (and the surroundings) generally go to École Secondaire Népisiguit (ESN - The French Highschool) in the City of Bathurst, and the few English people from Robertville (and the surroundings, predominantly in Bathurst) go to Bathurst High School (BHS).

== History ==
Established in 1884 by a Roman Catholic priest by the name of François-Antoine Robert, its residents are predominantly francophone.

== Demographics ==
In the 2021 Census of Population conducted by Statistics Canada, Robertville had a population of 969 living in 388 of its 394 total private dwellings, a change of 3.4% from its 2016 population of 937. With a land area of 5.64 km^{2} (2.18 sq mi), it had a population density of 171.8/km^{2} (445.0/sq mi) in 2021.

== See also ==
- List of communities in New Brunswick
