= Restigouche-Chaleur =

Provincial electoral district in New Brunswick, Canada

Coordinates: 47.77°N 65.80°W

Restigouche Chaleur
New Brunswick electoral district
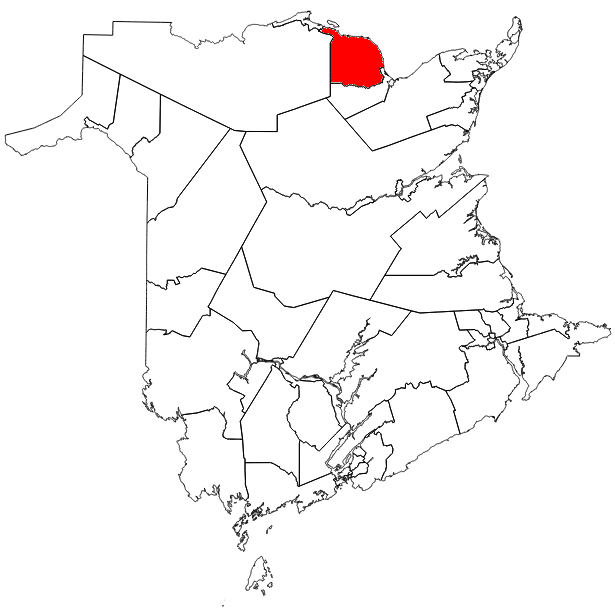
- The riding of Restigouche Chaleur in relation to other New Brunswick electoral districts

Defunct provincial electoral district
- Legislature: Legislative Assembly of New Brunswick
- District created: 1973
- First contested: 1974
- Last contested: 2020

Demographics
- Population (2011): 14,043
- Electors (2013): 11,097
- Census division(s): Gloucester, Restigouche
- Census subdivision(s): (2023) Bathurst, Belle-Baie, Belledune, Chaleur Rural District, Heron Bay, Restigouche Rural District

Restigouche-Chaleur was a provincial electoral district for the Legislative Assembly of New Brunswick, Canada. It is a redistribution of the riding of Nigadoo-Chaleur.

== History and geography ==
Nigadoo-Chaleur was created in the 1973 electoral redistribution as one of the five districts from the previous Gloucester district, defined as the parish of Beresford and the villages in that area of Gloucester County. It gained the remaining part of Belledune in Durham Parish from Restigouche East (which merged into Dalhousie-Restigouche East) and lost the area of parish of Beresford south of the Nigadoo River to Nepisiguit-Chaleur (now Nepisiguit) in the 1994 redistribution but did not change further in 2006. In the 2013 redistribution it lost Beresford to the new district of Bathurst West-Beresford but gained territory to its south running west of the Bathurst and Beresford municipal lines down to the Tetagouche river.

In its current form, it ranges from Belledune in the north, following the coast along the Nepisiguit Bay through the villages of Pointe-Verte, Petit-Rocher and Nigadoo to the boundary of Beresford, then turning south as far as the Tetagouche River

The riding is bordered by Bathurst West-Beresford to the south, Campbellton-Dalhousie and Restigouche West to the west, and Chaleur Bay to the northeast.

During the 53rd Legislative Assembly, Albert Doucet was removed from the Liberal cabinet on February 5, 1997 and then was removed from caucus in March of that year, due to comments criticizing NB Power, the Liberals' efforts to help Northern New Brunswick, and then Premier Frank McKenna's leadership. He sat as an independent until January 30, 1998 when he was accepted back into the Liberal fold.

=== Members of the Legislative Assembly ===
This riding has elected the following members of the Legislative Assembly:

Assembly	Years	Member	Party
Nigadoo-Chaleur; Riding created from Gloucester
48th	1974–1978	Roland Boudreau	Progressive Conservative
49th	1978–1982	Pierre Godin	Liberal
50th	1982–1987	Pierre Godin	Liberal
51st	1987–1991	Pierre Godin	Liberal
52nd	1991–1995	Albert Doucet	Liberal
53rd	1995–1997	Albert Doucet	Liberal
53rd	1997–1998	Albert Doucet	Independent
53rd	1998–1999	Albert Doucet	Liberal
54th	1999–2003	Roland Haché	Liberal
55th	2003–2006	Roland Haché	Liberal
56th	2006–2010	Roland Haché	Liberal
57th	2010–2014	Roland Haché	Liberal
Restigouche-Chaleur
58th	2014–2018	Daniel Guitard	Liberal
59th	2018–2020	Daniel Guitard	Liberal
60th	2020–2022	Daniel Guitard	Liberal
60th	2023–2024	Marco LeBlanc	Liberal
Riding dissolved into Belle-Baie-Belledune, Restigouche East and Bathurst

== Election results ==
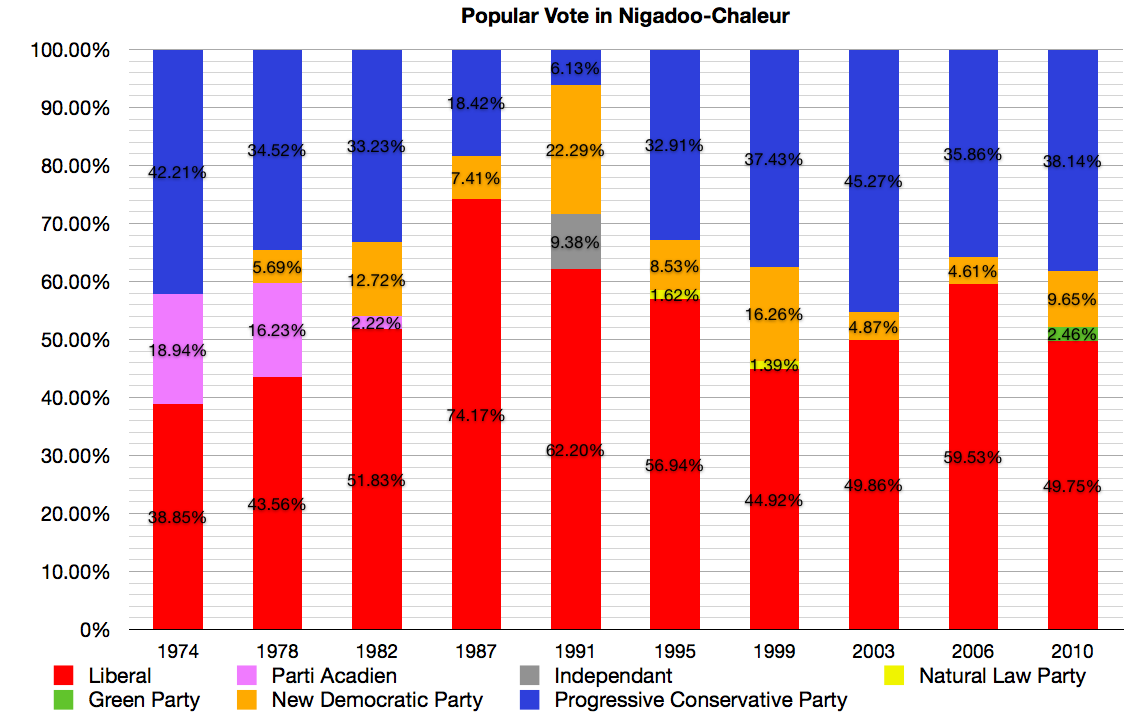
Nigadoo-Chaleur's popular vote percentages over time

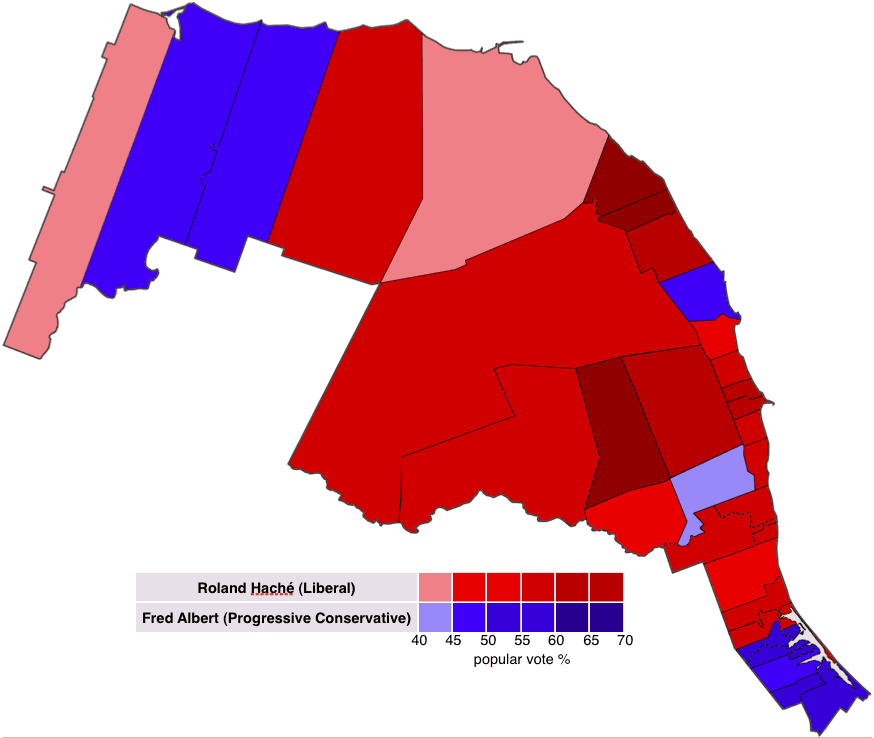
Nigadoo-Chaleur's poll-by-poll winners for the 2010 New Brunswick election

=== Restigouche-Chaleur ===
New Brunswick provincial by-election, April 24, 2023 Resignation of Daniel Guitard to run for mayor of Belle-Baie.
Party	Candidate	Votes	%	±%
Liberal	Marco LeBlanc	2,462	50.56	-5.10
Green	Rachel Boudreau	1,541	31.65	+4.04
Progressive Conservative	Anne Bard-Lavigne	771	15.83	-0.89
New Democratic	Alex Gagne	95	1.95	
Total valid votes		4,869	99.77	
Total rejected ballots		11	0.23	-0.21
Turnout		4,880	44.41	-17.41
Eligible voters		10,989		
Liberal hold		Swing		-4.57
Source: Elections New Brunswick

2020 New Brunswick general election
Party	Candidate	Votes	%	±%
Liberal	Daniel Guitard	3,823	55.66	-10.38
Green	Marie Larivière	1,896	27.61	+15.22
Progressive Conservative	Louis Robichaud	1,149	16.73	+4.42
Total valid votes		6,868	99.57	
Total rejected ballots		30	0.43	+0.03
Turnout		6,898	61.82	+1.53
Eligible voters		11,159		
Liberal hold		Swing		-12.80
Source: Elections New Brunswick

2018 New Brunswick general election
Party	Candidate	Votes	%	±%
Liberal	Daniel Guitard	4,430	66.04	+12.13
Green	Mario Comeau	831	12.39	+10.27
Progressive Conservative	Charles Stewart	826	12.31	-2.53
New Democratic	Paul Tremblay	621	9.26	-19.87
Total valid votes		6,708	99.60	
Total rejected ballots		27	0.40	-0.30
Turnout		6,735	60.29	-5.94
Eligible voters		11,171		
Liberal hold		Swing		+0.93
Source: Elections New Brunswick

2014 New Brunswick general election
Party	Candidate	Votes	%	±%
Liberal	Daniel Guitard	4,069	53.92	+4.15
New Democratic	Ray Godin	2,198	29.12	+19.50
Progressive Conservative	Gilberte Boudreau	1,120	14.84	-23.32
Green	Mario Comeau	160	2.12	-0.32
Total valid votes		7,547	99.30	
Total rejected ballots		53	0.70	-0.52
Turnout		7,600	66.23	-7.15
Eligible voters		11,476		
Liberal notional hold		Swing		-7.67

=== Nigadoo-Chaleur ===
2010 New Brunswick general election
Party	Candidate	Votes	%	±%	Expenditures
Liberal	Roland Haché	3,649	49.77	-9.76	$27,451
Progressive Conservative	Fred Albert	2,798	38.16	+2.30	$27,293
New Democratic	Serge Beaubrun	706	9.63	+5.02	$124
Green	Mathieu Laplante	179	2.44	–	$0
Total valid votes/expense limit		7,332	98.79		$29,719
Total rejected ballots		90	1.21	+0.20	
Turnout		7,422	73.38	+1.78	
Eligible voters		10,115			
Liberal hold		Swing		-6.03	

2006 New Brunswick general election
Party	Candidate	Votes	%	±%	Expenditures
Liberal	Roland Haché	4,311	59.53	+9.67	$27,175
Progressive Conservative	Fred Albert	2,597	35.86	-9.41	$25,627
New Democratic	Serge Beaubrun	334	4.61	-0.26	$191
Total valid votes/expense limit		7,242	98.99		$28,446
Total rejected ballots		74	1.01	-0.08	
Turnout		7,316	71.60	-3.19	
Eligible voters		10,218			
Liberal hold		Swing		+9.54	

2003 New Brunswick general election
Party	Candidate	Votes	%	±%	Expenditures
Liberal	Roland Haché	3,887	49.86	+4.94	$13,968
Progressive Conservative	Hermel Vienneau	3,529	45.27	+7.84	$24,844
New Democratic	Kate Heyward	380	4.87	-11.39	$0
Total valid votes/expense limit		7,796	98.91		$25,467
Total rejected ballots		86	1.09	+0.18	
Turnout		7,882	74.79	-1.17	
Eligible voters		10,539			
Liberal hold		Swing		-1.45	

1999 New Brunswick general election
Party	Candidate	Votes	%	±%	Expenditures
Liberal	Roland Haché	3,435	44.92	-12.02	$16,763
Progressive Conservative	Hermel Vienneau	2,862	37.43	+4.52	$18,280
New Democratic	Raoul Charest	1,244	16.27	+7.74	$20,748
Natural Law	Gilles Godin	106	1.39	-0.24	$0
Total valid votes/expense limit		7,647	99.09		$23,603
Total rejected ballots		70	0.91	-0.53	
Turnout		7,717	75.95	-10.26	
Eligible voters		10,160			
Liberal hold		Swing		-8.27	

1995 New Brunswick general election
Party	Candidate	Votes	%	±%	Expenditures
Liberal	Albert Doucet	4,421	56.94	-5.26	$19,503
Progressive Conservative	Maxime Lejeune	2,555	32.91	+26.78	$16,434
New Democratic	Ulric DeGrâce	662	8.53	-13.77	$2,517
Natural Law	Gilles Godin	126	1.62	–	$0
Total valid votes/expense limit		7,764	98.57		$22,444
Total rejected ballots		113	1.43	+0.20	
Turnout		7,877	86.22	+12.44	
Eligible voters		9,136			
Liberal hold		Swing		-16.02	

1991 New Brunswick general election
Party	Candidate	Votes	%	±%	Expenditures
Liberal	Albert Doucet	4,732	62.20	-11.97	$14,660
New Democratic	Raoul Charest	1,696	22.29	+14.88	$4,595
Independent	Ulric DeGrâce	714	9.38	–	no return filed
Progressive Conservative	David Boudreau	466	6.13	-12.29	no return filed
Total valid votes/expense limit		7,608	98.77		$21,206
Total rejected ballots		95	1.23	+0.80	
Turnout		7,703	73.78	-8.19	
Eligible voters		10,441			
Liberal hold		Swing		-13.43	

1987 New Brunswick general election
Party	Candidate	Votes	%	±%	Expenditures
Liberal	Pierre Godin	5,953	74.17	+22.34	$15,394
Progressive Conservative	Annonciade "Nancy" Arsenault	1,478	18.42	-14.81	$13,893
New Democratic	John Gagnon	595	7.41	-5.31	$100
Total valid votes/expense limit		8,026	99.57		$16,993
Total rejected ballots		35	0.43	-0.70	
Turnout		8,061	81.96	-4.64	
Eligible voters		9,835			
Liberal hold		Swing		+18.58	

1982 New Brunswick general election
Party	Candidate	Votes	%	±%	Expenditures
Liberal	Pierre Godin	4,057	51.83	+8.27	$10,598
Progressive Conservative	Daniel Comeau	2,601	33.23	-1.29	$12,142
New Democratic	Rhéal Boudreau	996	12.72	+7.03	$1,365
Parti acadien	André Blanchard	174	2.22	-14.01	$50
Total valid votes/expense limit		7,828	98.86		$13,605
Total rejected ballots		90	1.14	+0.46	
Turnout		7,918	86.60	+2.23	
Eligible voters		9,143			
Liberal hold		Swing		+4.78	

1978 New Brunswick general election
Party	Candidate	Votes	%	±%	Expenditures
Liberal	Pierre Godin	2,960	43.56	+4.70	$9,165
Progressive Conservative	Roland Boudreau	2,346	34.52	-7.70	$10,208
Parti acadien	Dr. Jean-Pierre Lanteigne	1,103	16.23	-2.70	$1,012
New Democratic	Kevin O'Connell	387	5.69	–	$1,528
Total valid votes/expense limit		6,796	99.33		$12,091
Total rejected ballots		46	0.67	-0.35	
Turnout		6,842	84.38	+2.23	
Eligible voters		8,109			
Liberal gain from Progressive Conservative		Swing		+6.20	

1974 New Brunswick general election
Party	Candidate	Votes	%
Progressive Conservative	Roland Boudreau	2,255	42.22
Liberal	J. Normand Arseneau	2,075	38.85
Parti acadien	Euclide Chiasson	1,011	18.93
Total valid votes		5,341	98.98
Total rejected ballots		55	1.02
Turnout		5,396	82.14
Eligible voters		6,569	
The previous multi-member riding of Gloucester elected five Liberals in the last election; one Progressive Conservative was elected in the 1972 by-election. None of the incumbents ran in this riding.
