= Roland Haché =

Canadian politician (1947–2020)

Member of the New Brunswick Legislative Assembly for Nigadoo-Chaleur
- In office June 7, 1999 – September 22, 2014
- Preceded by: Albert Doucet
- Succeeded by: Daniel Guitard

Personal details
- Born: June 14, 1947 Nigadoo, New Brunswick
- Died: April 24, 2020 (aged 72) Bathurst, New Brunswick
- Party: Liberal

Roland Haché (June 14, 1947 – April 24, 2020) was a politician in New Brunswick, Canada. He was a member of the Legislative Assembly of New Brunswick representing the electoral district of Nigadoo-Chaleur from 1999 to 2014.

He earned a Bachelor of Arts and a Bachelor of Education at the University of Moncton and taught classes at the college level.

Haché entered politics when he was elected mayor of Petit-Rocher, New Brunswick in a 1995 by-election held after no candidates came forward in the municipal election earlier that year. He was re-elected by acclamation in 1998.

He left his post as mayor in 1999, following his election to the legislature. Haché, a Liberal, was the only non-incumbent of his party to win a seat in that election that saw his party reduced from 44 to 10 seats.

In 2002, he was co-chair of Shawn Graham's successful campaign for the leadership of his party. He was re-elected in 2003 and served as critic for the department of Business New Brunswick from the election to June 20, 2006, when he became election readiness chair for Northern New Brunswick for the coming election and chair of the Legislature's health committee.

He was re-elected in the 2006 election when his party formed the government. Haché died of cancer on April 24, 2020, at the age of 72.

New Brunswick provincial government of Shawn Graham
Cabinet posts (2)
Predecessor	Office	Successor
Kelly Lamrock	Minister of Education; 2009–2010	Jody Carr
Trevor Holder	Minister of Environment; 2006–2009	T. J. Burke
Special Cabinet Responsibilities
Predecessor	Title	Successor
none	Minister responsible for the Northern New Brunswick Initiative; 2006–2009 new designation	Donald Arseneault
