= Pierre Godin =

Canadian politician

Member of the Legislative Assembly of New Brunswick
- In office 1978–1991
- Preceded by: Roland Boudreau
- Succeeded by: Albert Doucet
- Constituency: Nigadoo-Chaleur

Personal details
- Born: April 14, 1947 (age 78) Petit-Rocher, New Brunswick
- Party: New Brunswick Liberal Association
- Occupation: social worker

Pierre Godin (born April 14, 1947) is a former Canadian politician. He served in the Legislative Assembly of New Brunswick from 1978 to 1991 as a Liberal member from the constituency of Nigadoo-Chaleur.
