= Marco LeBlanc =

Canadian politician

Member of the New Brunswick Legislative Assembly for Belle-Baie-Belledune Restigouche-Chaleur (2023–2024)
- Incumbent
- Assumed office April 24, 2023
- Preceded by: Daniel Guitard

Personal details
- Born: Petit-Rocher, New Brunswick
- Party: Liberal
- Education: Université de Moncton

Marco LeBlanc (born in Petit-Rocher) is a Canadian politician from the New Brunswick Liberal Association who was elected to serve Restigouche-Chaleur in a by-election held on April 24, 2023 by-election on April 24, 2023. Since the 2024 election, he has served as MLA for Belle-Baie-Belledune.

== Election History ==
2024 New Brunswick general election: Belle-Baie-Belledune
Party	Candidate	Votes	%	±%
Liberal	Marco LeBlanc	5,053	63.08	+4.28
Green	Rachel Boudreau	1,411	17.61	-7.59
Progressive Conservative	Louis Robichaud	1,254	15.65	-0.35
New Democratic	Tyler (Ty) Boulay	293	3.66	
Total votes		8,011	100.0%	
Turnout			-	
Eligible voters		-		
Liberal notional hold		Swing		

New Brunswick provincial by-election, April 24, 2023: Restigouche-Chaleur Resignation of Daniel Guitard to run for mayor of Belle-Baie.
Party	Candidate	Votes	%	±%
Liberal	Marco LeBlanc	2,462	50.56	-5.10
Green	Rachel Boudreau	1,541	31.65	+4.04
Progressive Conservative	Anne Bard-Lavigne	771	15.83	-0.89
New Democratic	Alex Gagne	95	1.95	
Total valid votes		4,869	99.77	
Total rejected ballots		11	0.23	-0.21
Turnout		4,880	44.41	-17.41
Eligible voters		10,989		
Liberal hold		Swing		-4.57
Source: Elections New Brunswick
