= Daniel Guitard =

Canadian politician (born 1959)

His Worship Daniel Guitard

Mayor of Belle-Baie
- In office January 1, 2023 – June 1, 2026
- Preceded by: Position established
- Succeeded by: Rachel Boudreau

Speaker of the Legislative Assembly of New Brunswick
- In office October 23, 2018 – October 7, 2020
- Preceded by: Chris Collins
- Succeeded by: Bill Oliver

Member of the New Brunswick Legislative Assembly for Restigouche-Chaleur
- In office September 22, 2014 – November 27, 2022
- Preceded by: Roland Haché
- Succeeded by: Marco LeBlanc

Personal details
- Born: October 1, 1959 (age 66) Pointe-Verte, New Brunswick, Canada
- Party: Independent
- Other political affiliations: Liberal
- Occupation: Politician

Daniel Guitard (born October 1, 1959) is a Canadian politician who was the first mayor of Belle-Baie from 2023 to 2026. Previously, he was the Speaker of the Legislative Assembly of New Brunswick.

He was first elected to the Legislative Assembly of New Brunswick in the 2014 provincial election. He represented the electoral district of Restigouche-Chaleur as a member of the Liberal Party. On October 23, 2018, members of the assembly selected Guitard to serve as Speaker of the Legislative Assembly of New Brunswick.

On October 11, 2022, he announced his resignation from the legislature due to his plans to run for mayor of the newly created municipality of Belle-Baie. He would end up being successful. He was previously mayor of Pointe-Verte, New Brunswick.

He was born in Pointe-Verte, New Brunswick.

He did not run for another term as mayor of Belle-Baie in the 2026 New Brunswick municipal elections, citing that he is now over 65 years old and ready to step away from politics into semi-retirement. He was succeeded in the municipal election by Rachel Boudreau.
