= Roland Boudreau =

Canadian politician (1935–2019)

Member of the Legislative Assembly of New Brunswick
- In office 1974–1978
- Succeeded by: Pierre Godin
- Constituency: Nigadoo-Chaleur

Personal details
- Born: October 19, 1935 Pointe-Verte, New Brunswick
- Died: June 14, 2019 (aged 83) Bathurst, New Brunswick
- Party: Progressive Conservative Party of New Brunswick
- Spouse: Marjorie Lavigne
- Children: 5

Roland C. Boudreau (October 19, 1935 – June 14, 2019) was a Canadian politician. He served in the Legislative Assembly of New Brunswick from 1974 to 1978 as member of the Progressive Conservative party from the riding of Nigadoo-Chaleur.
