= Belle-Baie-Belledune =

Provincial electoral district in New Brunswick, Canada

New Brunswick electoral district

Provincial electoral district
- Legislature: Legislative Assembly of New Brunswick
MLA
Marco LeBlanc
Liberal
- District created: 2023
- First contested: 2024

Belle-Baie-Belledune is a Canadian provincial electoral district for the Legislative Assembly of New Brunswick. It was created out of parts of Restigouche-Chaleur and Bathurst West-Beresford.

== District created ==
It was created in 2023 and was first contested during the 2024 New Brunswick general election. It is the largest successor of now abolished Restigouche-Chaleur. The riding largely comprises Belle-Baie and Belledune, with a part of the Chaleur Rural District.

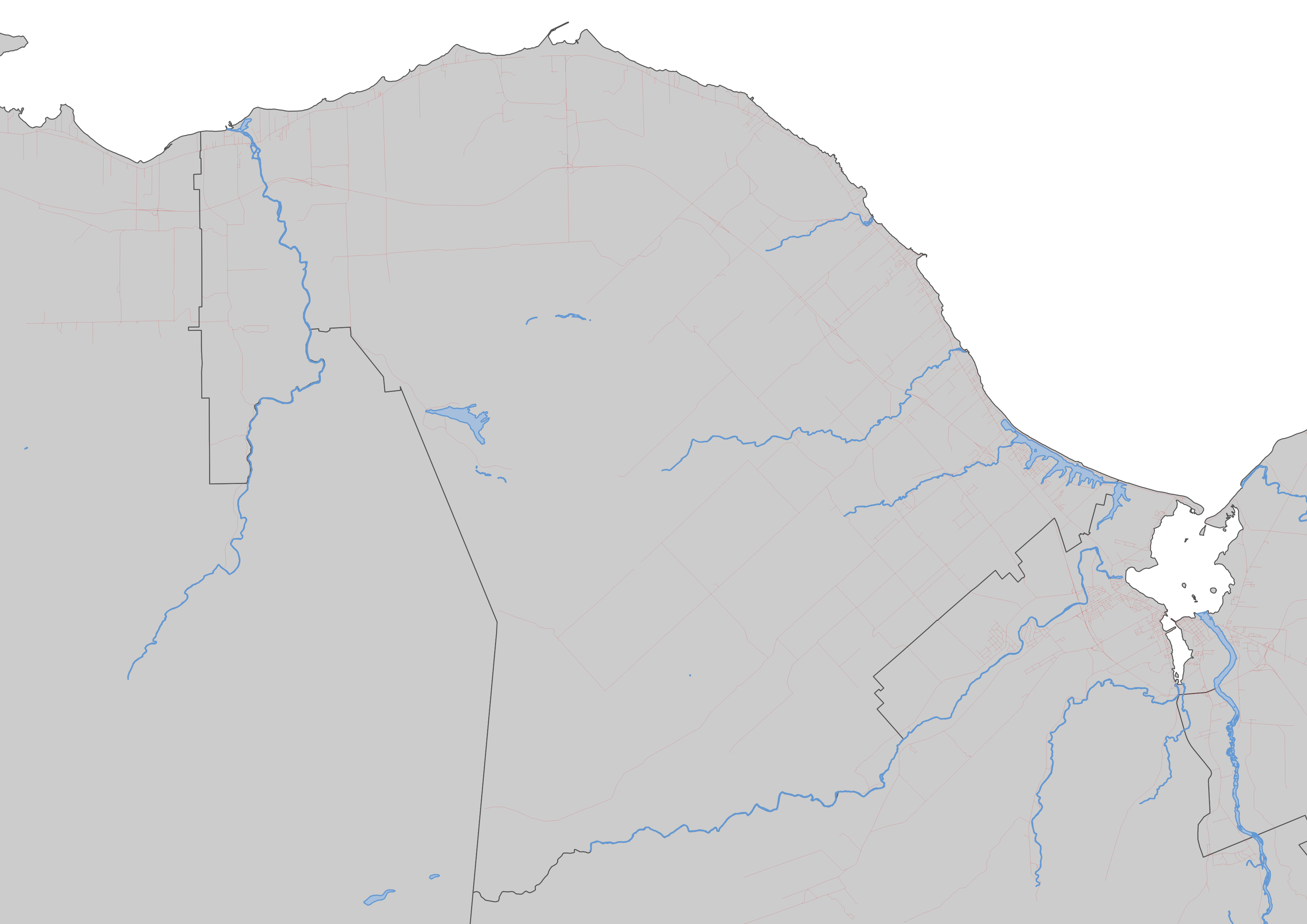
Belle-Baie-Belledune (as it exists from 2023) and the roads in the riding

== Members of the Legislative Assembly ==
Belle-Baie-Belledune
Assembly	Years	Member	Party
61st	2024–Present	Marco LeBlanc	Liberal

== Election results ==
2024 New Brunswick general election
Party	Candidate	Votes	%	±%
Liberal	Marco LeBlanc	5,053	63.08	+4.28
Green	Rachel Boudreau	1,411	17.61	-7.59
Progressive Conservative	Louis Robichaud	1,254	15.65	-0.35
New Democratic	Tyler (Ty) Boulay	293	3.66	
Total votes		8,011	100.0%	
Turnout			-	
Eligible voters		-		
Liberal notional hold		Swing		

2020 provincial election redistributed results
Party	%
Liberal	58.8
Green	25.2
Progressive Conservative	16.0

== See also ==
- List of New Brunswick provincial electoral districts
- Canadian provincial electoral districts
