= Nigadoo =

Former Village in, New Brunswick

Nigadoo Mimoogwodoo
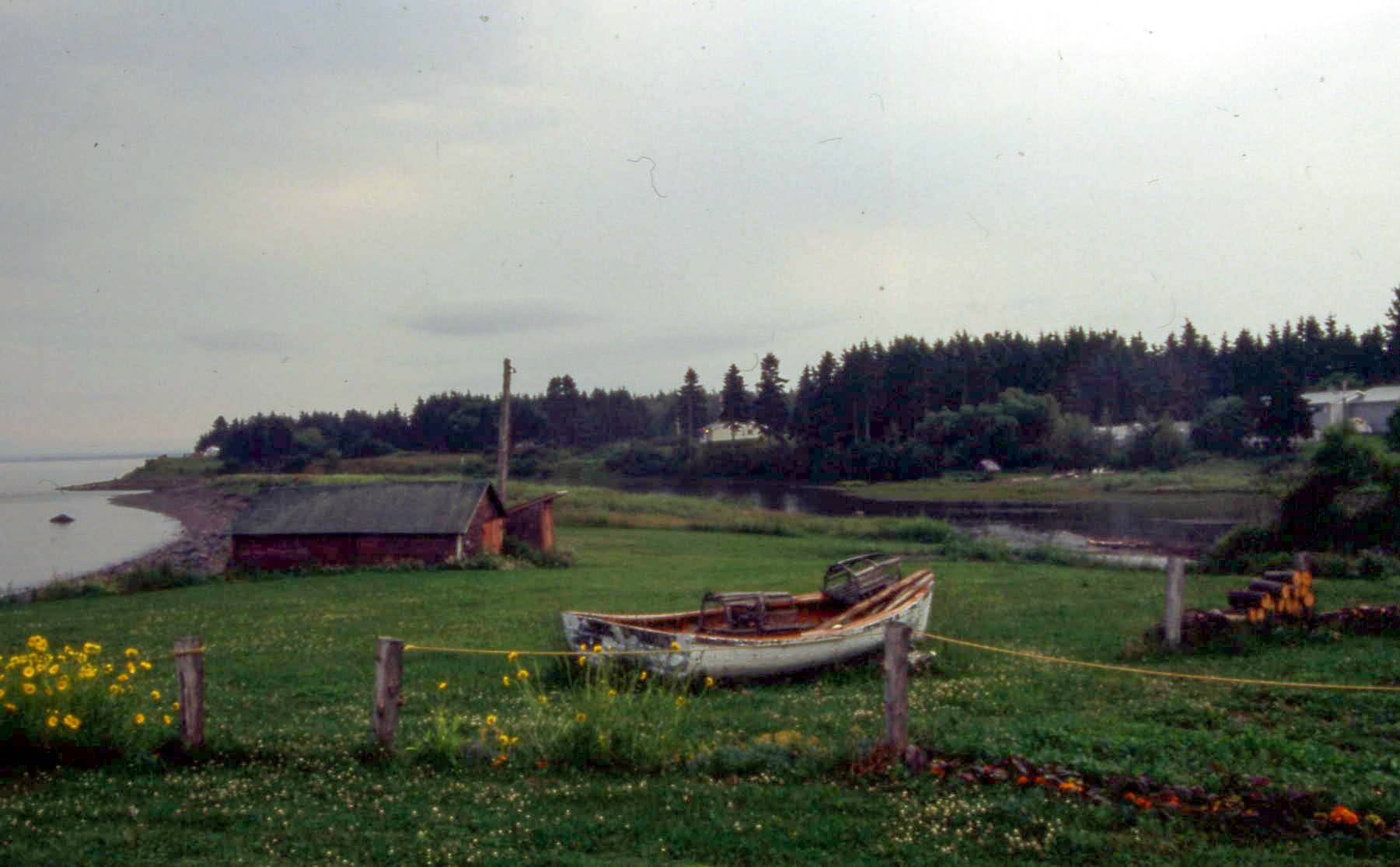

- Location within New Brunswick.
- Coordinates: 47.73805°N 65.711°W
- Country: Canada
- Province: New Brunswick
- County: Gloucester
- Parish: Beresford
- Municipality: Belle-Baie
- Incorporated: 1967
- Amalgamated: 1 January 2023
- Electoral Districts Federal: Acadie—Bathurst
- Provincial: Nigadoo-Chaleur

Area
  - Land: 7.65 km^{2} (2.95 sq mi)

Population (2021)
  - Total: 997
  - Density: 130.4/km^{2} (338/sq mi)
  - Change (2016–21): ▲3.5%
  - Dwellings: 450
- Time zone: UTC-4 (AST)
  - Summer (DST): UTC-3 (ADT)
- Postal code: E8K
- Area code: 506
- Highways Route 11 Route 134: Route 315; Route 322

Nigadoo is a former village in Gloucester County, New Brunswick. In 2023 it was amalgamated with surrounding municipalities to form the town of Belle-Baie. Nigadoo is located at the mouth of the Nigadoo River on Nepisiguit Bay, 15 kms north of Bathurst and adjacent to Beresford.

In the Mi'gmaq language "nigadoo" or "Mimoogwodoo" roughly translates as "place to hide".

== History ==
The name Nigadoo likely comes from the old word “Mimoogwodoo” meaning “the hiding place”. Long before Samuel de Champlain, John Cabot or Nicolas Denys charted the Chaleur Region it was inhabited by the Mi’gmaq People.

The legend on how Nigadoo got its name goes back to those times before European settlers came. Historically, is known that the Mi’gmaq people and the Iroquois (Mohawk) people were sometimes at war with each other, as their territories bordered each other around the area now known as Edmundston.

It was during one of these conflicts that it was said that Iroquois canoes were seen coming over the cape, what is known as Gespe'g "Gespe’g" meaning "end of the world", or "where the world ends".

The Mohawk were on a mission to invade the Mi’gmaq people along the Bay of Chaleur which was actually called (Mowebâktabāāk) meaning "The Biggest Bay". Little did the Mohawk know, that there were Mi’gmaq scouts and runners who saw the fleet of canoes coming.

The Mi’gmaq in the Gespe’g sent runners or messengers ahead of the fleet to warn each village that the Mohawk warriors were coming. By the time the message was relayed all the way to Nepisiguit, “Oinpegitjoig ” the Mi’gmaq warriors had enough time to gather an offensive and they chose the mouth of the Nigadoo river to hide their canoes to ambush the Mohawk.

The mouth of the Nigadoo River was a strategic location due to the way the River is hidden from the Bay, as it flows around a sand bar that can still be seen to this day.

As the Mohawk fleet of canoes made their way down along the coast, they were surprised and ambushed by the Mi’gmaq warriors who defeated the invaders. It was after the success of this battle that the Mi’gmaq forever called this place "Mimoogwodoo"”.

Over time, as French Acadian settlers arrived, they asked their friends and neighbours the Mi’gmaq people what this meant. It is speculated that the pronunciation of Mimoogwodoo (mim-moo-gwah-doo) over time became Nigadoo.

On January 1, 2023, Nigadoo amalgamated with Beresford, Petit-Rocher, Pointe-Verte, and all or part of ten local service districts to form the new town of Belle-Baie. The community's name remains in official use.

== Demographics ==
Historical Census Data - Nigadoo, New Brunswick
| Year | Pop. | ±% |
|---|---|---|
| 1991 | 950 | — |
| 1996 | 961 | +1.2% |
| 2001 | 983 | +2.3% |
| 2001A | 958 | −2.5% |
| 2006 | 927 | −3.2% |
| 2011 | 952 | +2.7% |
| 2016 | 963 | +1.2% |
| 2021 | 997 | +3.5% |
(A) adjustment due to boundary change. Source:

In the 2021 Census of Population conducted by Statistics Canada, Nigadoo had a population of 997 living in 436 of its 450 total private dwellings, a change of 3.5% from its 2016 population of 963. With a land area of 7.65 km^{2} (2.95 sq mi), it had a population density of 130.3/km^{2} (337.5/sq mi) in 2021.

Canada census – Nigadoo, New Brunswick community profile

| | 2021 | 2011 |
| Population | 997 (+3.5% from 2016) | 952 (+2.7% from 2006) |
| Land area | 7.65 km^{2} (2.95 sq mi) | 7.69 km^{2} (2.97 sq mi) |
| Population density | 130.4/km^{2} (338/sq mi) | 123.8/km^{2} (321/sq mi) |
| Median age | 50 (M: 48.8, F: 52) | 45.2 (M: 44.2, F: 46.4) |
| Private dwellings | 435 (total) | 410 (total) |
| Median household income | | $48,782 |

References: 2021 2011

=== Language ===
Canada Census Mother Tongue - Nigadoo, New Brunswick
| Census | Total | French | | | English | | | French & English | | | Other | | |
| Year | Responses | Count | Trend | Pop % | Count | Trend | Pop % | Count | Trend | Pop % | Count | Trend | Pop % |
| 2021 | 995 | 870 | 0.0% | 87.43% | 95 | ▲26.67% | 9.95% | 30 | ▲100% | 3.01% | 5 | 0.0% | 0.52% |
| 2016 | 965 | 870 | ▲1.75% | 90.16% | 75 | ▼6.25% | 7.77% | 15 | 0% | 1.55% | 5 | 0.0% | 0.52% |
| 2011 | 955 | 855 | ▼1.2% | 89.53% | 80 | ▲45.5% | 8.38% | 15 | ▲ n/a% | 1.57% | 5 | ▲ n/a% | 0.52% |
| 2006 | 920 | 865 | ▲0.6% | 94.02% | 55 | ▼54.2% | 5.98% | 0 | 0.0% | 0.00% | 0 | 0.0% | 0.00% |
| 2001 | 980 | 860 | ▲3.6% | 87.76% | 120 | ▲33.3% | 12.24% | 0 | ▼100.0% | 0.00% | 0 | 0.0% | 0.00% |
| 1996 | 930 | 830 | n/a | 89.25% | 90 | n/a | 9.68% | 10 | n/a | 1.07% | 0 | n/a | 0.00% |

== See also ==
- List of communities in New Brunswick
