= 2022 New Brunswick municipal elections =

Local elections in Canada

- 28 November 2022
- Registered: 232,004
- Turnout: 35.77%

The 2022 New Brunswick municipal elections were held in the Canadian province of New Brunswick on 28 November 2022 to elect mayors and councillors in newly formed municipalities following the 2023 New Brunswick local governance reform process. The new municipalities came into existence on 1 January 2023.

In total, there were elections for 50 new municipalities and 12 rural districts, with a total of 446 elected positions. Of the 446 positions, 148 seats were elected by acclamation. 12 positions had no candidates stand for election and were to be filled in by-elections held on February 13 and October 23 of 2023. In addition, 13 elections were subject to recounts which took place between 1 December 2022 and 9 December 2022. Two recounts resulted in a change to the vote totals, but neither of these changed the winners of the elections.

Elections were not held in municipalities such as Moncton, Saint John and Fredericton which were not affected by the local governance reform, while others which saw minor changes only held elections in the areas that were added to their territory.

== Acadian Peninsula Rural District ==
The results for the Acadian Peninsula rural district advisory committee are as follows:

Candidate	Votes	%
Robert Power	Acclaimed	
Johnny Stewart	Acclaimed	
Denis Thériault	Acclaimed	

== Alnwick ==
The results for mayor and council of Alnwick are as follows:

=== Mayor ===
Candidate	Votes	%
Ernest Robichaud	Acclaimed	

=== Council ===
==== Ward 1 ====
Candidate	Votes	%
Gerald Albert Ross	Acclaimed	

==== Ward 2 ====
Candidate	Votes	%
Eva May Hache	Acclaimed	

==== Ward 3 ====
Candidate	Votes	%
Paul-Emile Thibodeau	Acclaimed	

==== Ward 4 ====
Candidate	Votes	%
Mireille Caissie	157	76.21
Henri Robichaud	49	23.79

==== Ward 5 ====
Candidate	Votes	%
Laurie W. Wishart	Acclaimed	

== Arcadia ==
The results for mayor and council of Arcadia are as follows:

=== Mayor ===
Candidate	Votes	%
Derek Pleadwell	Acclaimed	

=== Council ===
==== Ward 1 ====
Candidate	Votes	%
Tammy Gordon	Acclaimed	

==== Ward 2 ====
Candidate	Votes	%
Paul Mennier	Acclaimed	

==== Ward 3 ====
Candidate	Votes	%
Elizabeth (Liz) Watson	Acclaimed	

==== Ward 4 ====
Candidate	Votes	%
Steven Sharpe	113	74.34
Craig Dykeman	39	25.66

==== Ward 5 ====
Candidate	Votes	%
Sheila Black	Acclaimed	

==== Ward 6 ====
Candidate	Votes	%
Paula Jo-Ann Gahan-Magee	87	66.92
Derek Moore	43	33.08

== Baie-des-Hérons/Heron Bay ==
Dalhousie mayor Normand Pelletier was elected mayor. He defeated Charlo mayor Gaétan Pelletier and Dalhousie councillor Gail Fearon.

The results for mayor and council of Heron Bay are as follows:

=== Mayor ===
Candidate	Votes	%
Normand Pelletier	1,253	53.50
Gail Fearon	690	29.46
Gaétan Pelletier	399	17.04

=== Council ===
==== Ward 1 (Note: Each voter was permitted to vote for up to two candidates.) ====
Candidate	Votes	%
Leigh Walsh	501	42.60
Cynthia Good Cormier	442	37.59
Luc Arseneault	233	19.81

==== Ward 2 ====
Candidate	Votes	%
Lisa Pelletier	509	31.23
Jean Robert Haché	444	27.24
Kevin Lavigne	371	22.76
Anick Michaud	205	12.58
Charles Stewart	101	6.20

==== Ward 3 ====
Candidate	Votes	%
Ken Chartrand	558	41.06
Denis McIntyre	532	39.15
Patrick Clarke	269	19.79

== Bathurst ==
Throughout the local governance reform process, the areas added to the City of Bathurst were grouped together as Ward 2. The City of Bathurst, as it existed prior to the reforms, became known as Ward 1. As a result, an election was held to elect two council members for Ward 2.

The results for Ward 2 of Bathurst are as follows:

=== Ward 2 ===
Candidate	Votes	%
Darryl Branch	Acclaimed	
Mike Skerry	Acclaimed	

== Beaurivage ==
The results for mayor and council of Beaurivage are as follows:

=== Mayor ===
Candidate	Votes	%
Arnold J. Vautour	1,423	56.85
Roger Doiron	980	39.15
Brian D. Stevens	100	4.00

=== Council ===
==== At-Large (Note: Each voter was permitted to vote for up to two candidates.) ====
Candidate	Votes	%
Stella Richard	1340	29.76
Dennis Mazerolle	1011	22.46
Stéphane Godin	828	18.39
Denis Arseneault	763	16.95
Laureanne Stewart	560	12.44

==== Ward 1 ====
Candidate	Votes	%
Oswald Mazerolle	Acclaimed	

==== Ward 2 ====
Candidate	Votes	%
no candidate		

==== Ward 3 ====
Candidate	Votes	%
Howard Vautour	250 (Note: This result was confirmed in a recount.)	50.20
Danielle Andrée Dugas	248	49.80

==== Ward 4 ====
Candidate	Votes	%
Paul Lirette	Acclaimed	

==== Ward 5 ====
Candidate	Votes	%
Melanie (Boudreau) McDermott	249	57.91
Linda Savoie	181	42.09

==== Ward 6 ====
Candidate	Votes	%
JoAnne Robichaud	265	51.56
Lucie Vautour	249	48.44

== Beausoleil ==
The results for mayor and council of Beausoleil are as follows:

=== Mayor ===
Candidate	Votes	%
Jean Hebert	1,323	55.80
Diane Gllant	1,048	44.20

==== By-election ====
Following the resignation of Hebert on September 11, 2024, a by-election will be held on December 9, 2024 to replace him:

Results:

Candidate	Votes	%
Roméo J. Bourque	890	49.25
Jody Dallaire	698	38.63
André Thériault	177	9.80
Lenny O'Brien	26	1.44
Pamela Court	16	0.89

=== Council ===
==== At-Large (Note: Each voter was permitted to vote for up to three candidates.) ====
Candidate	Votes	%
Monique Robichaud	1,807	29.69
Louis Babineau	1,457	23.94
Paul Babineau	1,091	17.93
Justin Vautour	1,084	17.81
Ricky Babineau	647	10.63

==== Ward 1 ====
Candidate	Votes	%
Dianna Goguen	749	82.76
Adrien (Tabutte) Léger	156	17.24

==== Ward 2 ====
Candidate	Votes	%
Maurice R. Cormier	Acclaimed	

==== Ward 3 ====
Candidate	Votes	%
Linda Savoie	213	51.82
Michael G. Poirier	131	31.87
Roger J. Robichaud	67	16.30

==== Ward 4 ====
Candidate	Votes	%
Daniel Bourgeois	Acclaimed	

== Belle-Baie ==
The results for mayor and council of Belle-Baie are as follows:

=== Mayor ===
Candidate	Votes	%
Daniel Guitard	2,138	46.23
Rachel Boudreau	1,829	39.55
Maxime Lejeune	658	14.23

=== Council ===
==== At-Large (Note: Each voter was permitted to vote for up to three candidates.) ====
Candidate	Votes	%
Olivier Dilhac	1,763	14.17
Marie Larivière	1,623	13.04
Gaston Frenette	1,616	12.99
Luc Desjardins	1,510	12.14
Jean-Marc Cormier	1,504	12.09
Brigitte Couturier	1,466	11.78
Jenny Arseneau	1,225	9.84
Ulric DeGrâce	1,065	8.56
Raphaël Roy	671	5.39

==== Ward 1 ====
Candidate	Votes	%
Joël Olivier	460	55.83
Normand Plourde	364	44.17

==== Ward 2 ====
Candidate	Votes	%
Ronnie Arseneau	392	47.46
Brigitte Guitard	364	44.07
Marc Roy	70	8.47

==== Ward 3 ====
Candidate	Votes	%
Charles Doucet	Acclaimed	

==== Ward 4 ====
Candidate	Votes	%
Annik Noël	551	54.45
Réjean Guitard	461	45.55

==== Ward 5 ====
Candidate	Votes	%
Jean-Guy Grant	Acclaimed	

==== Ward 6 ====
Candidate	Votes	%
Anne Bard-Lavigne	Acclaimed	

== Bois-Joli ==
The results for mayor and council of Bois-Joli are as follows:

=== Mayor ===
Candidate	Votes	%
Mario Pelletier	Acclaimed	

=== Council ===
==== At-Large ====
Candidate	Votes	%
Josée Doucet-Thériault	Acclaimed	
Donald J. Savoie	Acclaimed	

==== Ward 1 (Note: Each voter was permitted to vote for up to two candidates.) ====
Candidate	Votes	%
Cindy Roy Bernard	556	43.40
Peggy Savoie Leclair	399	31.15
Denis Fournier	326	25.45

==== Ward 2 ====
Candidate	Votes	%
Guy Landry	674	47.07
Sophie Maltais	506	35.34
Daniel Albert	252	17.60

== Butternut Valley ==
The results for mayor and council of Butternut Valley are as follows:

=== Mayor ===
Candidate	Votes	%
Alan Brown	305	38.66
Frank Jopp	299	37.90
Steven Ronald Tingley	108	13.69
Dave Cruickshank	77	9.76

=== Council ===
==== Ward 1 ====
Candidate	Votes	%
Thomas P. Jeffery	Acclaimed	

==== Ward 2 ====
Candidate	Votes	%
Vicky Gaunce	162	67.22
Tony Raymond	79	32.78

==== Ward 3 ====
Candidate	Votes	%
David Andrew Titus	137	55.92
Raleigh Myers	108	44.08

==== Ward 4 ====
Candidate	Votes	%
Mark K. Rideout	151	66.81
Dana Hicks	75	33.19

== Campbellton ==
Incumbent Campbellton mayor Ian Comeau ran against Atholville mayor Jean-Guy Levesque.

The results for mayor and council of Campbellton are as follows:

=== Mayor ===
Candidate	Votes	%
Jean-Guy Levesque	3,306	67.10
Ian Comeau	1,498	30.40
Kevin Bond	123	2.50

=== Council ===
==== Ward 1 ====
Candidate	Votes	%
Maurice (Moe) Comeau	Acclaimed	

==== Ward 2 (Note: Each voter was permitted to vote for up to two candidates.) ====
Candidate	Votes	%
Steve Theriault	449	32.58
Gaëtan Cormier	472	34.25
Arthur Thibault	270	19.59
Jean Soucy	187	13.57

==== Ward 3 ====
Candidate	Votes	%
Glen Perron	532	35.02
Julien Ouellette	519	34.17
Jean-Claude Charest	468	30.81

==== Ward 4 (Note: Each voter was permitted to vote for up to five candidates.) ====
Candidate	Votes	%
Diane Cyr	1,415	12.52
Mélanie Parent	1,402	12.40
Luc Couturier	1,223	10.82
Wes Knight	1,146	10.14
Sterling (Fuzzy) Loga	987	8.73
Conrad Pitre	914	8.08
Brent Babcock	906	8.01
Frédéric (Fred) Daigle	849	7.51
Marco Savoie	831	7.35
Diane Mignault	781	6.91
Tyler Richard	434	3.84
Joey Goulette	418	3.70

== Cap-Acadie ==
=== Mayor ===
Louise Landry, the mayor of Beaubassin East ran for mayor.

The results for mayor and council of Cap-Acadie are as follows:

Candidate	Votes	%
Serge Leger	2,255	61.21
Louise Landry	854	23.18
Gilles Cormier	575	15.61

=== Council (Note: Each voter was permitted to vote for up to eight candidates.) ===
Candidate	Votes	%
Marc-André Vienneau	2,407	10.80
Yvonne LeBlanc	2,015	9.04
Josée Vautour	1,758	7.89
Susan Cormier	1,703	7.64
Louis Léger	1,692	7.59
Wendy Bourque	1,654	7.42
Rachel Boudreau	1,580	7.09
Eric LeBlanc	1,437	6.45
Charline Burke	1,305	5.86
Ronnie Duguay	1,242	5.57
Luc Drisdelle	1,055	4.73
Hector Cormier	1,007	4.52
Omer Leger	1,004	4.51
Francine Landry	976	4.38
Jean-Albert Cormier	660	2.96
Michel Emery Gaudet	415	1.86
Charles Thibodeau	371	1.67

== Capital Region Rural District ==
The results for the Capital Region rural district advisory committee are as follows:

=== Ward 1 (Note: Each voter was permitted to vote for up to two candidates.) ===
Candidate	Votes	%
Lloyd Burns	245	36.68
Jennifer Dawn Stairs	236	35.33
Lloyd Dutcher	109	16.32
Leo Kolijn	78	11.68

=== Ward 2 (Note: Each voter was permitted to vote for up to four candidates.) ===
Candidate	Votes	%
Kimberely A. Warren	367	28.21
Marty Forsythe	280	21.52
Eleanor Lindsay	247	18.99
Weldon A. Moore	232	17.83
Greg Shatford	175	13.45

== Caraquet ==
The results for mayor and council of Caraquet are as follows:

=== Mayor ===
Candidate	Votes	%
Bernard Thériault	Acclaimed	

=== Council ===
==== Ward 1 (Note: Each voter was permitted to vote for up to four candidates.) ====
Candidate	Votes	%
Louise Blanchard	1,384	18.45
Terry King Wai Ing	1,194	15.92
Florence Albert	1,014	13.52
Kim Légère	824	10.99
Kevin J. Haché	757	10.09
Camille Gionet	731	9.75
Michel G. Boucher	704	9.39
Marc-André Vienneau	461	6.15
Kyla Thériault	431	5.75

==== Ward 2 ====
Candidate	Votes	%
Pierre Boudreau	158	74.53
Maurice Mallet	54	25.47

==== Ward 3 ====
Candidate	Votes	%
Jacques Boucher	Acclaimed	

==== Ward 4 ====
Candidate	Votes	%
Jean-Claude Doiron	Acclaimed	

==== Ward 5 (Note: Each voter was permitted to vote for up to two candidates.) ====
Candidate	Votes	%
Marie-Soleil Landry	323	20.07
Nicole Hébert	287	17.84
Roger R. Chiasson	267	16.59
Benoit LeBouthillier	237	14.73
Richard Frigault	186	11.56
Nicole Michon	111	6.90
Nancy Doiron	105	6.53
Josué Doucet	93	5.78

== Central York ==
The results for mayor and council of Central York are as follows:

=== Mayor ===
Candidate	Votes	%
David R. Duplessis	746	46.89
Chris Duffie	503	31.62
Blaine Nason	302	18.98
Edward F. Merrithew	40	2.51

=== Council ===
==== Ward 1 ====
Candidate	Votes	%
Dustin Brownlow	74	63.79
Paul Lemmon	42	36.21

==== Ward 2 ====
Candidate	Votes	%
Joan L. Edwards	Acclaimed	

==== Ward 3 ====
Candidate	Votes	%
Cheryl (Sherry) Brewer	93	57.06
Daniel (Danny) J. Roy	70	42.94

==== Ward 4 ====
Candidate	Votes	%
Ken Drake	Acclaimed	

==== Ward 5 ====
Candidate	Votes	%
Jarret T. Forbes	147	75.77
Daniel (Danny) J. Roy	47	24.23

==== Ward 6 ====
Candidate	Votes	%
Wayne Annis	124 (Note: This result was confirmed in a recount.)	50.20
Louella Woods	123	49.80

==== Ward 7 ====
Candidate	Votes	%
Rachel Downing	Acclaimed	

== Chaleur Rural District ==
The results for the Chaleur rural district advisory committee are as follows:

=== Ward 1 ===
Candidate	Votes	%
no candidate		

=== Ward 2 ===
Candidate	Votes	%
Laura McNulty	Acclaimed	

=== Ward 3 ===
Candidate	Votes	%
Nathalie Paulin	Acclaimed	

== Champdoré ==
The results for mayor and council of Champdoré are as follows:

=== Mayor ===
Candidate	Votes	%
Jean-Pierre Richard	1,134	61.40
Donald Bastarache	713	38.60

=== Council ===
==== Ward 1 (Note: Each voter was permitted to vote for up to three candidates.) ====
Candidate	Votes	%
Stephan Richard	557	28.46
Eugère Cormier	521	26.62
Gilles Léger	466	23.81
Maurice Robichaud	413	21.10

==== Ward 2 ====
Candidate	Votes	%
Daniel Hicks	Acclaimed	

==== Ward 3 (Note: Each voter was permitted to vote for up to two candidates.) ====
Candidate	Votes	%
Maurice Maillet	496	38.51
Marc Babineau	461	35.79
Edmond Jaillet	331	25.70

==== Ward 4 ====
Candidate	Votes	%
Léandre Bastarache	Acclaimed	

== District of Carleton North ==
=== Mayor ===
The results for mayor and council of the District of Carleton North are as follows:

Candidate	Votes	%
Andrew Harvey	1,462	53.79
Karl E. Curtis	610	22.44
Charles MacDonald	496	18.25
Charles Hugh McNair	150	5.52

=== Council ===
==== At-Large (Note: Each voter was permitted to vote for up to two candidates.) ====
Candidate	Votes	%
Karen Hargrove	1,211	23.33
Laurel Bradstreet	796	15.33
Charles (Charlie) Guest	792	15.26
Clay Marco	672	12.95
Patricia (Trish) Foster	582	11.21
Joe Trevors	462	8.90
Ryan Dickinson	249	4.80
David MacKenzie Hunter	214	4.12
Stephen Hutchings	115	2.22
Basil Kazakos	98	1.89

==== Ward 1 ====
Candidate	Votes	%
Michael J. Stewart	156	38.71
Ronald Dickinson	130	32.26
Kasie Graham	68	16.87
Robert Lee	49	12.16

==== Ward 2 ====
Candidate	Votes	%
Chala Watson	228	64.04
Debbie Thomas	128	35.96

==== Ward 3 ====
Candidate	Votes	%
Scott Oakes	496	61.01
Rodney C. Broad	103	12.67
Jodi Allan O'Neill	89	10.95
Michael Allen	75	9.23
Elaina Oakes	50	6.15

==== Ward 4 ====
Candidate	Votes	%
Raynold (Ray) Haines	190	26.65
Jillienne Denny	172	24.12
David Trafford	155	21.74
Mary Jo Andow	112	15.71
Theresa Hunter	84	11.78

==== Ward 5 ====
Candidate	Votes	%
Angel Connor	139	32.25
Gailen W. Allan	125	29.00
Brent W. Pearson	115	26.68
James (Jim) B. Doherty	52	12.06

== Doaktown ==
The results for mayor and council of Doaktown are as follows:

=== Mayor ===
Candidate	Votes	%
Arthur O'Donnell	262	51.98
Caroline St. Pierre Taylor	196	38.89
Bayard O'Donnell	46	9.13

=== Council (Note: Each voter was permitted to vote for up to five candidates.) ===
Candidate	Votes	%
Doreen Parker	377	18.72
Beresford (Barry) Price	371	18.42
Paige Storey	342	16.98
Robert M. Gilks	329	16.34
Jeff Porter	323	16.04
Steven A. Carroll	272	13.51

== Eastern Charlotte ==
The results for mayor and council of Eastern Charlotte are as follows:

=== Mayor ===
Candidate	Votes	%
John D. Craig	Acclaimed	

=== Council ===
==== At-Large (Note: Each voter was permitted to vote for up to two candidates.) ====
Candidate	Votes	%
David R. Hatt	640	26.48
Lisa McKay	457 (Note: This result was confirmed in a recount.)	18.91
Bruce Jackson	448	18.54
Dale E. Shaw	348	14.40
Brenda Allison	347	14.36
Romey Heuf	177	7.32

==== Ward 1 ====
Candidate	Votes	%
Terry Lee	Acclaimed	

==== Ward 2 ====
Candidate	Votes	%
Michael Thompson	196	69.26
Logan Cook	87	30.74

==== Ward 3 ====
Candidate	Votes	%
Alexa Detorakis	139	48.77
Sam Rubin	107	37.54
Joan Majchrowski	39	13.68

==== Ward 4 ====
Candidate	Votes	%
Adam R. Hatt	Acclaimed	

==== Ward 5 ====
Candidate	Votes	%
Wayne MacQuarrie	Acclaimed	

==== Ward 6 ====
Candidate	Votes	%
Darrell E. Tidd	Acclaimed	

== Edmundston ==
In the local governance reform process, portions of the local service districts of Saint-Jacques and Saint-Joseph, as well as the Village of Rivière-Verte, were added to the City of Edmundston. The former Village of Rivière-Verte became Ward 5 of the City of Edmundston. As a result, an election was held to elect a council member for Ward 5.

The results for Ward 5 of Edmundston are as follows:

=== Ward 5 (Note: Each voter was permitted to vote for up to two candidates.) ===
Candidate	Votes	%
Daniel St-Germain	214	48.42
Lisa Parent	117 (Note: This result was confirmed in a recount.)	26.47
Gino Couturier	111	25.11

== Five Rivers ==
The results for mayor and council of Five Rivers are as follows:

=== Mayor ===
Candidate	Votes	%
Tina Beers	667	63.65
Andrew Casey	381	36.35

=== Council ===
==== At-Large (Note: Each voter was permitted to vote for up to two candidates.) ====
Candidate	Votes	%
Katie Robertson	575	30.09
William (Billy) Flanagan	504	26.37
Grace Morris	311	16.27
Joel Hebert	265	13.87
Denise Melanson	256	13.40

==== Ward 1 ====
Candidate	Votes	%
Karen Campbell	166	83.42
Mark Bolton	33	16.58

==== Ward 2 ====
Candidate	Votes	%
Mike Robertson	215	71.43
James D. Lane	66	21.93
Marcel Doiron	20	6.64

==== Ward 3 ====
Candidate	Votes	%
Kelly Pidgeon	124	53.22
George Mitton	63	27.04
Glenn S. Stothart	46	19.74

==== Ward 4 ====
Candidate	Votes	%
Elaine Warren	177	58.42
Carl Yvon Cosby	126	41.58

== Fundy Albert ==
The results for mayor and council of Fundy Albert are as follows:

=== Mayor ===
Candidate	Votes	%
Robert Rochon	793	46.13
Andrew Casey	499	29.03
Peter Jubb	427	24.84

=== Council ===
==== Ward 1 ====
Candidate	Votes	%
John S. Ereaux	121	41.72
Kelly Edgett	93	32.07
Clark Butland	76	26.21

==== Ward 2 ====
Candidate	Votes	%
Loretta Elderkin	234	66.48
Jason V. Horsman	37	10.51
Hartley O'Connor	37	10.51
Margaret Bogle-Hicks	17	4.83
Jared Allen Parsons	15	4.26
Mathew Dick	12	3.41

==== Ward 3 ====
Candidate	Votes	%
Jeff Land	205	68.33
James Wilson	95	31.67

==== Ward 4 ====
Candidate	Votes	%
Jeffrey A. Jonah	205	57.91
Don Bowman	149	42.09

==== Ward 5 ====
Candidate	Votes	%
James (Jim) Coates	140	69.55
Fred Irving	61	30.35

==== Ward 5 ====
Candidate	Votes	%
Heather Ward Russell	127	54.51
Harry Doyle	106	45.49

== Fundy Rural District ==
The results for the Fundy rural district advisory committee are as follows:

=== Ward 1 ===
Candidate	Votes	%
Bruce Dryer	74	60.66
Micah Williamson	48	39.34

=== Ward 2 ===
Candidate	Votes	%
no candidate		
no candidate		

=== Ward 3 ===
Candidate	Votes	%
Raymond Riddell	Acclaimed	

== Fundy Shores ==
The results for mayor and council of Fundy Shores are as follows:

=== Mayor ===
Candidate	Votes	%
George (Denny) Cogswell	399	65.41
J. Scott Wright	211	34.59

=== Council ===
==== At-Large (Note: Each voter was permitted to vote for up to two candidates.) ====
Candidate	Votes	%
Deanna G. Bent	422	37.85
Susan Farquharson	354	32.65
Rick Else	237	21.26
Jack Hester	92	8.25

==== Ward 1 ====
Candidate	Votes	%
Heather Dawn Saulnier	Acclaimed	

==== Ward 2 ====
Candidate	Votes	%
Tina Marie Dealy	Acclaimed	

==== Ward 3 ====
Candidate	Votes	%
Lorraine R. Thompson	Acclaimed	

== Fundy-St. Martins ==
The results for mayor and council of Fundy-St. Martins are as follows:

=== Mayor ===
Candidate	Votes	%
James Bedford	Acclaimed	

=== Council ===
==== Ward 1 ====
Candidate	Votes	%
John D. Cairns	Acclaimed	
George Cyr	Acclaimed	
Jeanette Spearing	Acclaimed	

==== Ward 2 ====
Candidate	Votes	%
Shawn Brown	83	40.69
Reg Manzer	67	32.84
Tim Brewer	54	26.47

==== Ward 3 ====
Candidate	Votes	%
Bradley Brown	Acclaimed	

==== Ward 4 ====
Candidate	Votes	%
Greg Moran	55	53.92
Mark Gallagher	47	46.08

== Grand Bay-Westfield ==
In the local governance reform process, the only area added to the Town of Grand Bay-Westfield was a portion of the local service district of Westfield. The added area became Ward 2, while the town, as it existed before the reform, became Ward 1. As a result, an election was held to elect a council member for Ward 2.

The results for Ward 2 of Grand Bay-Westfield are as follows:

=== Ward 2 ===
Candidate	Votes	%
Keri Burpee	Acclaimed	

== Grand Lake ==
The results for mayor and council of Grand Lake are as follows:

=== Mayor ===
Candidate	Votes	%
Kevin Nicklin	Acclaimed	

=== Council ===
==== At-Large ====
Candidate	Votes	%
Greg Smith	1,309	62.21
Jean-Noël Allain	795	37.79

==== Ward 1 ====
Candidate	Votes	%
Mary-Faith Mazerolle	188	77.37
Mark Allen	55	22.63

==== Ward 2 (Note: Each voter was permitted to vote for up to three candidates.) ====
Candidate	Votes	%
Mike Richardson	717	24.35
Gloria W. Hogg	665	22.58
Mike Richardson	611	20.75
Derrick Quigley	598	20.31
Colleen Mooren	191	6.49
Joshua I. Magee	163	5.53

==== Ward 3 ====
Candidate	Votes	%
Gary Glenn	145	51.97
Randy Vernon Hickey	74	26.52
Dustin E.E. Clark	60	21.51

==== Ward 4 (Note: Each voter was permitted to vote for up to two candidates.) ====
Candidate	Votes	%
Chanda L. Klassen	282	28.89
Shaun Ward	187	19.16
Keith West	182	18.65
Lindsey Fraser	179	18.34
Candace Richardson	86	8.81
Brenda C. Barton	60	6.15

== Grand-Bouctouche ==
The results for mayor and council of Grand-Bouctouche are as follows:

=== Mayor ===
Candidate	Votes	%
Aldeo Saulnier	1,233	58.05
Jean-Noël Allain	891	41.95

=== Council ===
==== At-Large (Note: Each voter was permitted to vote for up to two candidates.) ====
Candidate	Votes	%
Mariette Cormier	1,645	43.77
David Boudreau	1,215	32.33
Claude (Edgar) LeBlanc	898	23.90

==== Ward 1 ====
Candidate	Votes	%
Lise LeBlanc	512	44.79
Clétus Maillet	29.05	32.33
Simonne Belliveau	299	26.16

==== Ward 2 ====
Candidate	Votes	%
Achille Bastarache	Acclaimed	
Pauline Hébert	Acclaimed	

==== Ward 3 ====
Candidate	Votes	%
Jean-Claude Babineau	Acclaimed	
Gérald (Gerry) Saulnier	Acclaimed	

== Grand-Sault/Grand Falls ==
School district director general Bertrand Beaulieu was elected by acclamation.

The results for mayor and council of Grand Falls are as follows:

=== Mayor ===
Candidate	Votes	%
Bertrand Beaulieu	Acclaimed	

=== Council ===
==== Ward 1 (Note: Each voter was permitted to vote for up to two candidates.) ====
Candidate	Votes	%
Marcel Levesque	463	36.95
Mario Pelletier	395	31.52
Allain Desjardins	257	20.51
Mario Godbout	138	11.01

==== Ward 2 ====
Candidate	Votes	%
Claudette Goguen Kavanaugh	Acclaimed	

==== Ward 3 ====
Candidate	Votes	%
Danny Soucy	598	37.38
David Raines	519	32.44
Billy Walker	483	30.19

==== Ward 4 ====
Candidate	Votes	%
Annie Deschênes	Acclaimed	
Sebastien R. Michaud	Acclaimed	

==== Ward 5 ====
Candidate	Votes	%
Josée Rioux-Walker	Acclaimed	
France Roussel	Acclaimed	

== Greater Miramichi Rural District ==
The results for the Greater Miramichi rural district advisory committee are as follows:

=== Ward 1 ===
Candidate	Votes	%
Lynn D. Gregan	Acclaimed	

=== Ward 2 ===
Candidate	Votes	%
Sonya E. Martin	Acclaimed	

=== Ward 3 ===
Candidate	Votes	%
Larry Allain	85	74.56
Sean Legassie	29	25.44

== Hampton ==
The results for mayor and council of Hampton are as follows:

=== Mayor ===
Candidate	Votes	%
Robert (Dewey) Doucet	Acclaimed	

=== Council ===
==== At-Large (Note: Each voter was permitted to vote for up to two candidates.) ====
Candidate	Votes	%
Jeremy Salgado	927	38.53
Todd Beach	778	32.34
Debbie Hickey	572	23.77
David Goucher	129	5.36

==== Ward 1 ====
Candidate	Votes	%
Sheree L. Trecartin	173	57.48
Mike Adams	128	42.52

==== Ward 2 ====
Candidate	Votes	%
Ken Chorley	Acclaimed	
Kim Tompkins	Acclaimed	

==== Ward 3 ====
Candidate	Votes	%
Karin Boyé	108	45.00
Pamela (Pam) Ann McKenzie	73	30.42
Robert Russell	59	24.58

== Hanwell ==
In the local governance reform process, the only area added to the Rural Community of Hanwell was a portion of the local service district of Kingsclear. The added area was divided into wards 5 and 6. As a result, elections were held to elect one council member for each of the new wards.

The results for wards 5 and 6 of Hanwell are as follows:

=== Ward 5 ===
Candidate	Votes	%
Deborah (Debby) Elinor Peck	Acclaimed	

=== Ward 6 ===
Candidate	Votes	%
Lee Crouse	185	87.68
Paul MacIntosh	26	12.32

== Hartland ==
The results for mayor and council of Hartland are as follows:

=== Mayor ===
Candidate	Votes	%
Tracey D. Demerchant	Acclaimed	

=== Council ===
==== At-Large (Note: Each voter was permitted to vote for up to three candidates.) ====
Candidate	Votes	%
Lee Patterson	423	28.76
Stewart Fairgrieve	412	28.01
Wayne Douglas Britton	322	21.89
George Boone	314	21.35

==== Ward 1 ====
Candidate	Votes	%
Jason J. Smith	Acclaimed	

==== Ward 2 ====
Candidate	Votes	%
Mike Walton	Acclaimed	

==== Ward 3 ====
Candidate	Votes	%
Sam Walton	94	62.25
Rebecca Blaevoet	57	37.75

== Harvey ==
The results for mayor and council of Harvey are as follows:

=== Mayor ===
Candidate	Votes	%
Richard H. Corey	426	48.41
Winston Gamblin	312	35.45
Patricia (Pat) Carlson	142	16.14

=== Council ===
==== At-Large ====
Candidate	Votes	%
Shawn Little	Acclaimed	

==== Ward 1 ====
Candidate	Votes	%
Randy A. Chase	144	70.24
David A. Stairs	40	19.51
Eric McInnis	21	10.24

==== Ward 2 ====
Candidate	Votes	%
Andrew S. McLean	Acclaimed	

==== Ward 3 ====
Candidate	Votes	%
Sheryl Pepin	205	70.93
Ruthie Bresson	84	29.07

==== Ward 4 ====
Candidate	Votes	%
Joseph Kyle Chessie	Acclaimed	

== Hautes-Terres ==
The results for mayor and council of Hautes-Terres are as follows:

=== Mayor ===
Candidate	Votes	%
Denis Landry	Acclaimed	

=== Council ===
==== At-Large (Note: Each voter was permitted to vote for up to two candidates.) ====
Candidate	Votes	%
Luc Robichaud	1,374	37.52
Suzanne Thériault	1,058	28.89
Michel Haché	895	24.44
Alyre Ross	335	9.15

==== Ward 1 ====
Candidate	Votes	%
Cathy Gosselin	302	57.31
Mireille Pinet	225	42.69

==== Ward 2 ====
Candidate	Votes	%
Etienne Cormier	237	74.53
Jean-François (Jeff) Mantha	81	25.47

==== Ward 3 ====
Candidate	Votes	%
Albert Lagacé	251	66.05
Maurice Godin	129	33.95

==== Ward 4 ====
Candidate	Votes	%
Nathalie Mallais Comeau	Acclaimed	

==== Ward 5 ====
Candidate	Votes	%
Danny Comeau	Acclaimed	

==== Ward 6 ====
Candidate	Votes	%
Louis LeBouthillier	243	52.37
Richard Thibodeau	221	47.63

== Haut-Madawaska ==
The results for mayor and council of Haut-Madawaska are as follows:

=== Mayor ===
Candidate	Votes	%
Jean-Pierre Ouellet	792	54.40
Jean-Marc Nadeau	556	38.19
André Martin	108	7.42

=== Council ===
==== Ward 1-Saint-François (Note: Each voter was permitted to vote for up to two candidates.) ====
Candidate	Votes	%
Nancy Ann Landry	331	50.15
Rino Levasseur	168	25.45
Robert G. Bonenfant	161	24.39

==== Ward 2-Lac-Baker ====
Candidate	Votes	%
Ron Cormier	238	43.35
Bernard Soucy	166	30.24
Alpha Nadeau	145	26.41

==== Ward 3-Clair ====
Candidate	Votes	%
Richard Michaud	273	40.87
Lloyd Plourde	212	31.74
Carl Sawyer	183	27.40

==== Ward 4-Baker-Brook ====
Candidate	Votes	%
Francine Caron	Acclaimed	
Georges Michaud	Acclaimed	

==== Ward 5-Saint-Hilaire ====
Candidate	Votes	%
Michel J. Morin	Acclaimed	
Reginald Nadeau	Acclaimed	

== Île-de-Lamèque ==
The results for mayor and council of Île-de-Lamèque are as follows:

=== Mayor ===
Candidate	Votes	%
Bernard Savoie	1,256	46.73
Jules Haché	957	35.60
Allain Guignard	409	15.22
Paul F. Chiasson	66	2.46

=== Council ===
==== Ward 1 ====
Candidate	Votes	%
Gerard Benoit	Acclaimed	

==== Ward 2 ====
Candidate	Votes	%
Linda Lavoie	270	55.44
Luc Levesque	217	44.56

==== Ward 3 ====
Candidate	Votes	%
Alonzo Rail	247	71.59
Christian Duguay	78	22.61
Aldoris Ferron	20	5.80

==== Ward 4 ====
Candidate	Votes	%
Stéphanie Rail Larocque	217	53.71
Christina Hebert	187	46.29

==== Ward 5 ====
Candidate	Votes	%
Yvon Chiasson	149	46.42
Stéphane Gaouette	123	38.32
Denise Guignard	49	15.26

==== Ward 6 ====
Candidate	Votes	%
Jocelyne Kerry	187	45.61
Claude Ferron	113	27.56
Henri-Paul Guignard	65	15.85
Brahim Benahmed	45	10.98

==== Ward 7 ====
Candidate	Votes	%
Linda David	210	46.05
Colette (Vienneau) Plourde	160	35.09
Guy O. Chiasson	86	18.86

== Kedgwick ==
Following the local governance reform process, the only election held in Kedgwick was to elect one councillor for Ward 5. The winner joined the existing council and is now in charge of all files relating to the communities that were added to the Rural Community of Kedgwick.

The results for Ward 5 of Kedgwick are as follows:

=== Ward 5 ===
Candidate	Votes	%
Burt W. Paulin	Acclaimed	

== Kent Rural District ==
The results for the Kent rural district advisory committee are as follows:

=== Ward 1 ===
Candidate	Votes	%
Jean-Charles Daigle	Acclaimed	
Lucie Martin	Acclaimed	

=== Ward 2 ===
Candidate	Votes	%
Docile Cormier	Acclaimed	

== Kings Rural District ==
The results for the Kings rural district advisory committee are as follows:

=== At-Large ===
Candidate	Votes	%
Kevin K. Scott	Acclaimed	

=== Ward 1 ===
Candidate	Votes	%
no candidate		

=== Ward 2 ===
Candidate	Votes	%
Gordon Kierstead	Acclaimed	

== Lakeland Ridges ==
The results for mayor and council of Lakeland Ridges are as follows:

=== Mayor ===
Candidate	Votes	%
Tanya Marie Cloutier	443	59.54
Steve Buckingham	212	28.49
Gar Conklin	89	11.96

=== Council ===
==== Ward 1 (Note: Each voter was permitted to vote for up to two candidates.) ====
Candidate	Votes	%
Ross Stairs	122	38.13
Perry Bull	113	35.31
Gregory (Greg) Grant	85	26.56

==== Ward 2 ====
Candidate	Votes	%
Linda L. Porter	97	36.06
Patricia J. Budd	87	32.34
Greg Williams	85	31.60

==== Ward 3 ====
Candidate	Votes	%
Randy Stairs	113	29.66
Christopher Charles Gordon Yerxa	73 (Note: This result was confirmed in a recount.)	19.16
Alex Rodbard	69	18.11
Duane Gordon MacMillan	67	17.59
Lauren Boyd	59	15.49

==== Ward 4 ====
Candidate	Votes	%
Mark Grant	180	42.25
Michael Thomas Furrow	114	26.76
Christy Collier	97	22.77
Brayden Shawn Collier (Brayden Collicott)	35	8.22

== Maple Hills ==
The results for mayor and council of Maple Hills are as follows:

=== Mayor ===
Candidate	Votes	%
Erica Warren	722	55.54
Tracey Mullin	578	44.46

=== Council ===
==== At-Large (Note: Each voter was permitted to vote for up to two candidates.) ====
Candidate	Votes	%
Mark Estey	792	37.91
Eric Murray	768	36.76
Paul J. LeBlanc	529	25.32

==== Ward 1 ====
Candidate	Votes	%
David Gingras	319	60.76
Shawn W. Soucoup	128	24.38
Keith Hatto	78	14.86

==== Ward 2 ====
Candidate	Votes	%
Chad Martin	Acclaimed	

==== Ward 3 ====
Candidate	Votes	%
Marc Savoie	Acclaimed	

== Miramichi River Valley ==
The results for mayor and council of Miramichi River Valley are as follows:

=== Mayor ===
Candidate	Votes	%
Kevin Earl Russell	Acclaimed	

=== Council ===
==== At-Large (Note: Each voter was permitted to vote for up to three candidates.) ====
Candidate	Votes	%
Dwain Joseph Hallihan	896	29.58
Morgan Vickers	837	27.63
Sharon M. Vickers	718	23.70
Denver Brennan	578	19.08

==== Ward 1 ====
Candidate	Votes	%
Jeffrey Sheasgreen	369	87.86
Douglas Mullin	51	12.14

==== Ward 2 ====
Candidate	Votes	%
Darlene Mary Gillespie	Acclaimed	

==== Ward 3 ====
Candidate	Votes	%
Amanda Brennan	231	50.88
Ray Croft	191	42.07
Kevin Gauthier	32	7.05

== Municipal District of St. Stephen ==
The results for mayor and council of the Municipal District of St. Stephen are as follows:

=== Mayor ===
Candidate	Votes	%
Allan MacEachern	1,071	58.78
C. Burton Stewart	378	20.75
Ken Parker	373	20.47

=== Council ===
==== Ward 1 (Note: Each voter was permitted to vote for up to two candidates.) ====
Candidate	Votes	%
Brian Cornish	187	31.64
Joyce Wright	151	25.55
Daniel Dow	112	18.95
Tony Mann	90	15.23
Bill Olsen	51	8.63

==== Ward 2 (Note: Each voter was permitted to vote for up to four candidates.) ====
Candidate	Votes	%
Ghislaine Wheaton	584	16.97
Marg Harding	454	13.19
David Hyslop	450	13.08
Emily Rodas (Cunningham)	450	13.08
Bob Brown	438	12.73
Tanner Stewart	300	8.72
Brent Macpherson	298	8.66
Jamieson Smith	247	7.18
Vic Thiessen	220	6.39

==== Ward 3 ====
Candidate	Votes	%
Wade Greenlaw	329	33.23
Earle R. Eastman	223	22.53
Kim Henry (Ross)	141	14.24
J Kyle Moffatt	138	13.94
John Barker	104	10.51
Kris Booth	55	5.56

== Nackawic-Millville ==
The results for mayor and council of Nackawic-Millville are as follows:

=== Mayor ===
Candidate	Votes	%
Tim Fox	523	62.49
Ian Kitchen	314	37.51

=== Council ===
==== Ward 1 ====
Candidate	Votes	%
Katlyn (Katie) Nozzolillo	63 (Note: This result was confirmed in a recount.)	50.40
Anthony Moorcroft	62	49.60

==== Ward 2 ====
Candidate	Votes	%
Jeffery Clark	Acclaimed	

==== Ward 3 ====
Candidate	Votes	%
Greg MacFarlane	Acclaimed	
Robert (Bob) Simpson	Acclaimed	

==== Ward 4 ====
Candidate	Votes	%
Colin Trail	Acclaimed	

==== Ward 5 ====
Candidate	Votes	%
Michael Arbuckle	Acclaimed	

==== Ward 6 ====
Candidate	Votes	%
Errol Graham	73	61.34
Kim Allen	46	38.66

== Nashwaak ==
The results for mayor and council of Nashwaak are as follows:

=== Mayor ===
Candidate	Votes	%
David Sweeney	731	81.77
Jeff Macfarlane	101	11.30
Maggie Kavanagh	62	6.94

=== Council ===
==== Ward 1 ====
Candidate	Votes	%
Heather Holt-Logan	126	74.12
Evan G. Tozer	44	25.88

==== Ward 2 ====
Candidate	Votes	%
Victoria Green	Acclaimed	

==== Ward 3 ====
Candidate	Votes	%
Douglas (Doug) Koch	103	89.57
Tiana Lee Sellick	12	10.43

==== Ward 4 ====
Candidate	Votes	%
Amy Floyd	126	69.23
Cayley Pozza	56	30.77

==== Ward 5 ====
Candidate	Votes	%
Jeffrey Foster	Acclaimed	

==== Ward 6 ====
Candidate	Votes	%
Mike Mulherin	Acclaimed	

==== Ward 7 ====
Candidate	Votes	%
Andrew G.B. Ferris	Acclaimed	

== Northwest Rural District ==
The results for the Acadian Peninsula rural district advisory committee are as follows:

=== At-Large ===
Candidate	Votes	%
Josée Levesque	337	68.08
Stéphanie LeBel-Landry	158	31.92

=== Ward 1 ===
Candidate	Votes	%
Mario Volpe	206	53.23
Jocelyn Sirois	181	46.77

=== Ward 2 ===
Candidate	Votes	%
Jean-Marie St-Onge	Acclaimed	

== Nouvelle-Arcadie ==
The results for mayor and council of Nouvelle-Arcadie are as follows:

=== Mayor ===
Candidate	Votes	%
Jimmy Bourque	673	52.29
Pierrette Robichaud	614	47.71

=== Council ===
==== Ward 1 ====
Candidate	Votes	%
Darlene Desroches	123	59.42
Vincent Guèrette	84	40.58

==== Ward 2 ====
Candidate	Votes	%
Lynn Marie Doiron	Acclaimed	

==== Ward 3 (Note: Each voter was permitted to vote for up to two candidates.) ====
Candidate	Votes	%
Cyrille J. Cormier	364	32.73
Shawn Richard	325	29.23
Denis Doiron	222	19.96
Geneviève L. Latour	201	18.08

==== Ward 4 ====
Candidate	Votes	%
Yvon Doiron	81 (Note: This result was confirmed in a recount.)	35.84
Kevin Curry	75 (Note: In the initial count, 76 votes were counted for Kevin Curry. Following a recount, it was determined that he had actually received 75 votes.)	33.19
Chantal Arsenault	70	30.97

== Oromocto ==
In the local governance reform process, the only area added to Oromocto was a portion of the local service district of Lincoln. This area became Ward 4 and an election was held to elect two council members to represent the area.

In addition, on 21 July 2022, Mariliz Parent announced her resignation as councillor for Ward 2. As a result, a by-election was held to fill the vacancy.

The results for wards 2 and 4 of Oromocto are as follows:

=== Ward 2 ===
Candidate	Votes	%
Brad Whalen	Acclaimed	

=== Ward 4 ===
Candidate	Votes	%
Ryan Carr	Acclaimed	
Gary von Richter	Acclaimed	

== Restigouche Rural District ==
The results for the Restigouche rural district advisory committee are as follows:

=== At-Large ===
Candidate	Votes	%
Brad Mann	Acclaimed	

=== Ward 1 ===
Candidate	Votes	%
Loretta Smith	Acclaimed	

=== Ward 2 ===
Candidate	Votes	%
Audel Godin	88	64.71
Barry Firlotte	48	35.29

== Rivière-du-Nord ==
The results for mayor and council of Rivière-du-Nord are as follows:

=== Mayor ===
Candidate	Votes	%
Joseph Lanteigne	1305	81.92
Eric Landry	288	18.08

=== Council ===
==== At-Large (Note: Each voter was permitted to vote for up to two candidates.) ====
Candidate	Votes	%
Thérèse Haché	605	20.06
Gerard Battah	524	17.37
Jules Boudreau	404	13.40
Denise McLaughlin	340	11.27
Claude Clement	332	11.01
Isabelle Nowlan	318	10.54
Jolène Dugas	251	8.32
Margo Marguerite Haché	242	8.02

==== Ward 1 ====
Candidate	Votes	%
Anne Landry	216	58.38
Linda Landry	154	41.62

==== Ward 2 ====
Candidate	Votes	%
Colin MacLellan	238	75.56
Victor Bertin	77	24.44

==== Ward 3 ====
Candidate	Votes	%
Yvon Godin	Acclaimed	

==== Ward 4 ====
Candidate	Votes	%
Carole Frigault	236	56.59
Martin Dionne	181	43.41

== Saint Andrews ==
In the local governance reform process, the only areas added to the Town of Saint Andrews were the local service districts of Bayside and Chamcook. As a result, two elections were held in Saint Andrews to elect one council member representing Ward 1-Bayside and two council members representing Ward 2-Chamcook.

The results for wards 1 and 2 of Saint Andrews are as follows:

=== Ward 1-Bayside ===
Candidate	Votes	%
Darrell Weare	68	62.96
Jeremiah Kerr	40	37.04

=== Ward 2-Chamcook (Note: Each voter was permitted to vote for up to two candidates.) ===
Candidate	Votes	%
Annette Harland	178	51.30
Mark Bennett	129	37.18
Blair Gordon	40	11.53

== Saint-Quentin ==
The results for mayor and council of Saint-Quentin are as follows:

=== Mayor ===
Candidate	Votes	%
Nicole Somers	792	57.10
Joey Couturier	595	42.90

=== Council ===
==== Ward 1 (Note: Each voter was permitted to vote for up to three candidates.) ====
Candidate	Votes	%
Roger Guimond	638	25.67
Jean-Francois Martel	430	17.30
Marie-Josée Theriault	389	15.65
Amélie Deschênes	356	14.33
Marc J. Beaulieu	207	8.33
Marie-France Malenfant	199	8.01
Danny Perron	171	6.88
Pascal Langlois	95	3.82

==== Ward 2 ====
Candidate	Votes	%
Serge Pineault	335	23.88
Alain Martel	247	17.61
Patrick N. Jean	209	14.90
Chrissy St-Pierre	180	12.83
Martine Aubut Rousselle	176	12.54
Patrick Patenaude	159	11.33
Jean Luc Caouette	97	6.91

== Salisbury ==
The results for mayor and council of Salisbury are as follows:

=== Mayor ===
Candidate	Votes	%
Robert Campbell	Acclaimed	

=== Council ===
==== At-Large ====
Candidate	Votes	%
Jason Gallant	Acclaimed	

==== Ward 1 ====
Candidate	Votes	%
John Wiebe Dykstra	85	46.96
Alex Morton	75	41.44
Mike Archibald	21	11.60

==== Ward 2 ====
Candidate	Votes	%
Phyllis Bannister	Acclaimed	

==== Ward 3 ====
Candidate	Votes	%
Sarah Colwell	Acclaimed	
Nathan O'Blenis	Acclaimed	
Stephanie Thorne	Acclaimed	

==== Ward 4 ====
Candidate	Votes	%
Joseph (Joe) D'Ettore	94	64.38
Paula-Marie Carmel Kingston-Mather	52	35.62

== Shediac ==
In the local governance reform process, the local service districts of Pointe-du-Chêne, Shediac Cape, and Scoudouc Road, as well as a portion of the local service district of Scoudouc, were added to the Town of Shediac. These became wards 2, 3, 4, and 5, respectively. As a result, elections were held to elect one council member for each of the new wards.

The results for wards 2, 3, 4, and 5 of Shediac are as follows:

=== Ward 2 ===
Candidate	Votes	%
Harry McInroy	218	57.98
Odette N. Babineau	158	42.02

=== Ward 3 ===
Candidate	Votes	%
Murray Lloyd	Acclaimed	

=== Ward 4 ===
Candidate	Votes	%
Roland Cormier	Acclaimed	

=== Ward 5 ===
Candidate	Votes	%
Joël Després	Acclaimed	

== Shippagan ==
The results for mayor and council of Shippagan are as follows:

=== Mayor ===
Candidate	Votes	%
Kassim Doumbia	1,026	45.22
Danny Rousseau	800	35.26
Nathalie Blaquiere	443	19.52

=== Council ===
==== Ward 1 ====
Candidate	Votes	%
Nathalie Robichaud	228	71.92
Brigitte Mazerolle Arseneau	89	28.08

==== Ward 2 ====
Candidate	Votes	%
Laurent Robichaud	242	69.94
Benoit Savoie	104	30.06

==== Ward 3 ====
Candidate	Votes	%
Armand Caron	Acclaimed	

==== Ward 4 ====
Candidate	Votes	%
Amélie Ferron-Roussel	195	52.70
Marc Cormier	118	35.26
Pierre Luc Hache	57	15.41

==== Ward 5 ====
Candidate	Votes	%
Marie-Lou Noël	295	74.87
Linda Austin	99	25.13

==== Ward 6 ====
Candidate	Votes	%
Eda Roussel	314	78.89
Marie-Eve Landry	84	21.11

== Southeast Rural District ==
The results for the Southeast rural district advisory committee are as follows:

Candidate	Votes	%
Gaius Ricker	Acclaimed	
no candidate		
no candidate		

== Southern Victoria ==
The results for mayor and council of Southern Victoria are as follows:

=== Mayor ===
Candidate	Votes	%
Cindy D. McLaughlin	421	49.65
Marianne Bell	391	46.11
Terry Ritchie	36	4.25

=== Council ===
==== At-Large ====
Candidate	Votes	%
Sheldon Shaw	Acclaimed	

==== Ward 1 ====
Candidate	Votes	%
Todd McGuire	83 (Note: This result was confirmed in a recount.)	50.92
Joe Gee	80	49.08

==== Ward 2 (Note: Each voter was permitted to vote for up to three candidates.) ====
Candidate	Votes	%
Tamara Titus McPhail	435	31.07
Sheila E. Cummings	396	28.29
William (Bill) Stevenson	299	21.36
Fidèle H. Albert	270	19.29

==== Ward 3 ====
Candidate	Votes	%
Sara Plant	Acclaimed	

== Southwest Rural District ==
The results for the Southwest rural district advisory committee are as follows:

=== Ward 1 ===
Candidate	Votes	%
Brian Gardner	113	75.84
Dennis E. Blair	36	24.16

=== Ward 2 ===
Candidate	Votes	%
Jim Tubbs	Acclaimed	

=== Ward 3 ===
Candidate	Votes	%
Sheena Young	Acclaimed	

== Strait Shores ==
The results for mayor and council of Strait Shores are as follows:

=== Mayor ===
Candidate	Votes	%
Jason Stokes	Acclaimed	

=== Council (Note: Each voter was permitted to vote for up to four candidates.) ===
Candidate	Votes	%
Annamarie Lynn Boyd	278	24.26
Lois Oulton	263	22.95
Tanya Haynes	229	19.98
Stacy Jones	189 (Note: This result was confirmed in a recount.)	16.49
Neil R. Silliker	187	16.32

== Sunbury-York South ==
The results for mayor and council of Sunbury-York South are as follows:

=== Mayor ===
Candidate	Votes	%
David Hayward	391	55.38
Larry Delong	172	24.36
Moe Joseph Lagace	143	20.25

=== Council ===
==== At-Large ====
Candidate	Votes	%
Tegan Noble	Acclaimed	
Gilles K. Turner	Acclaimed	

==== Ward 1 ====
Candidate	Votes	%
Joey Bernard	Acclaimed	
no candidate		

==== Ward 2 (Note: Each voter was permitted to vote for up to three candidates.) ====
Candidate	Votes	%
Raymond Noble	295	33.52
Susan Yarom	241	27.39
Matthew Sheppard	210	23.86
Hajnalka Hartwick	134	15.23

== Sussex ==
The results for mayor and council of Sussex are as follows:

=== Mayor ===
Candidate	Votes	%
Marc Thorne	1,259	86.11
Richard Pearson	203	13.89

=== Council ===
==== At-Large (Note: Each voter was permitted to vote for up to three candidates.) ====
Candidate	Votes	%
Tim Wilson	734	18.52
Eric Nelson	716	18.06
Graham A. Milner	667 (Note: This result was confirmed in a recount.)	16.83
Wayne A. Wilkins	653	16.47
Pamela Jean Kaye	458	11.55
Paul J. Taylor	360	9.08
Allen Price	193	4.87
Shianne Brewer	183	4.62

==== Ward 1 (Note: Each voter was permitted to vote for up to two candidates.) ====
Candidate	Votes	%
Paul Ivan Maguire	393	21.97
Fred Brenan	380	21.24
Jane Boyle	374	20.91
Danny Holder	271	15.15
Sonja Davis Carhart	127	7.10
Richard Hawkes	127	7.10
Melinda M. Rankin	117	6.54

==== Ward 2 ====
Candidate	Votes	%
Catherine MacLeod	246	27.89
Doug Bobbitt	242	27.44
Terrance (Terry) D. Gale	188	21.32
Bob Burgess	133	15.08
Patsy Shay	73	8.28

== Tantramar ==
Shawn Mesheau, the mayor of Sackville ran for mayor.

The results for mayor and council of Tantramar are as follows:

=== Mayor ===
Candidate	Votes	%
Andrew Black	1,164	46.23
R. Shawn Mesheau	922	36.62
Bonnie Swift	432	17.16

=== Council ===
==== Ward 1 ====
Candidate	Votes	%
Debbie Wiggins-Colwell	176	68.22
Robert Corkerton	82	31.78

==== Ward 2 ====
Candidate	Votes	%
Barry Collins Hicks	94	36.58
Kevin J. Scott	79	30.74
Wendy Epworth	47	18.29
Natalie Donaher	37	14.40

==== Ward 3 (Note: Each voter was permitted to vote for up to four candidates.) ====
Candidate	Votes	%
Allison Butcher	1,098	18.67
Michael J. Tower	950	16.15
Bruce I. Phinney	861	14.64
Joshua Goguen	852	14.49
Alice C. Cotton	713	12.12
Sahitya Pendurthi	541	9.20
Virgil G. Hammock	419	7.12
Charles A. Harvey	225	3.83
Sana Mohamad	222	3.77

==== Ward 4 ====
Candidate	Votes	%
Matthew Estabrooks	154	64.17
Sabine Dietz	86	35.83

==== Ward 5 ====
Candidate	Votes	%
Gregory Martin	Acclaimed	

== Three Rivers ==
The results for mayor and council of Three Rivers are as follows:

=== Mayor ===
Candidate	Votes	%
Peter J. Saunders	Acclaimed	

=== Council ===
==== At-Large ====
Candidate	Votes	%
Dennis Murphy	365	59.64
Teri Mcmackin	247	40.36

==== Ward 1 ====
Candidate	Votes	%
Karen Hall-Middleton	109	78.99
Coy D. Horsman	29	21.01

==== Ward 2 ====
Candidate	Votes	%
Luke Lymburner	Acclaimed	

==== Ward 3 ====
Candidate	Votes	%
Angela Silverthorn	118	64.48
June P. Crandall	65	35.52

== Tobique Valley ==
The results for mayor and council of Tobique Valley are as follows:

=== Mayor ===
Candidate	Votes	%
Tom Eagles	619	70.82
Terry L. Sisson	131	14.99
Lee Reed	124	14.19

=== Council ===
==== Ward 1 (Note: Each voter was permitted to vote for up to two candidates.) ====
Candidate	Votes	%
Laurie Barry-Kinney	236	36.88
Joanne Michaud	151	23.59
Alex Stevenson	133	20.78
Shawn Arbeau	120	18.75

==== Ward 2 (Note: Each voter was permitted to vote for up to three candidates.) ====
Candidate	Votes	%
Gary Lee Harding	276	24.80
Tony Wright	256	23.00
Sharon DeWitt	227	20.40
Timothy Corbin	215	19.32
Aaron Roger Jones	139	12.49

==== Ward 3 ====
Candidate	Votes	%
Bill Eagles	92	78.63
Cathy Michaud	25	21.37

== Tracadie ==
The results for Ward 7 of Tracadie are as follows:

=== Ward 7 ===
Candidate	Votes	%
Pierre Morais	640	61.32
Ginette Saulnier	268	27.21
Vicky Haché Benoit	113	11.47

== Vallée-des-Rivières ==
The results for mayor and council of Vallée-des-Rivières are as follows:

=== Mayor ===
Candidate	Votes	%
Lise Anne Roussel	848	69.34
Kevin Bobby Ouellette	375	30.66

=== Council ===
==== Ward 1 (Note: Each voter was permitted to vote for up to two candidates.) ====
Candidate	Votes	%
Jacques Girard	227	42.35
Irène Gagnon Levesque	159	29.66
Nicole Poitras-Baulkaran	150	27.99

==== Ward 2 ====
Candidate	Votes	%
Bruce Desjardins	Acclaimed	
Mario Ringuette	Acclaimed	

==== Ward 3 ====
Candidate	Votes	%
Jean-Paul Soucy	195	39.88
Paul Roy	172	35.17
Tania Ouellette Roussel	122	24.95

==== Ward 4 ====
Candidate	Votes	%
Annick Bellefleur	292 (Note: In the initial count, 291 votes were counted for Annick Bellefleur. Following a recount, it was determined that she had actually received 292 votes.)	34.03
Luc Martin	290 (Note: In the initial count, 291 votes were counted for Luc Martin. Following a recount, it was determined that he had actually received 290 votes.)	33.92
Kevin Corbin	275 (Note: This result was confirmed in a recount.)	32.05

== Valley Waters ==
The results for mayor and council of Valley Waters are as follows:

=== Mayor ===
Candidate	Votes	%
Randy McKnight	421	43.76
John Urquhart	224	23.28
Wendy L. Alcorn	174	18.09
Chris E. Clark	143	14.86

=== Council ===
==== Ward 1 ====
Candidate	Votes	%
Charity McDonald	Acclaimed	

==== Ward 2 (Note: On December 16, 2022, An Act Respecting Local Governance Reform, 2022, no. 2 was given Royal Assent. This Act changed the number of councillor positions to elect in Ward 2 to 2. It also required the Municipal Electoral Officer to hold a by-election to fill the new vacancy in Ward 2 on February 13, 2023.) ====
Candidate	Votes	%
Stephen Muir	187	50.68
Carey Beth Gillis	182	49.32

==== Ward 3 (Note: On December 16, 2022, An Act Respecting Local Governance Reform, 2022, no. 2 was given Royal Assent. This Act changed the number of councillor positions to elect in Ward 3 to 1.) ====
Candidate	Votes	%
no candidate		
no candidate		

==== Ward 4 (Note: Each voter was permitted to vote for up to two candidates.) ====
Candidate	Votes	%
Ann-Marie Snyder	177	28.55
Harold Keith	150	24.19
Nicole Clement	149	24.03
Jeff Gaunce	144	23.23

== Western Valley Rural District ==
The results for the Western Valley rural district advisory committee are as follows:

=== Ward 1 ===
Candidate	Votes	%
Lynn K. Hambrook	Acclaimed	

=== Ward 2 ===
Candidate	Votes	%
no candidate		
no candidate		

== Woodstock ==
Incumbent Woodstock mayor Arthur Slipp ran against Town councillor Trina Milbury (Jones).

The results for mayor of Woodstock are as follows:

=== Mayor ===
Candidate	Votes	%
Trina Milbury	1,290	55.08
Arthur L. Slipp	981	41.89
Mark J. Dumas	71	3.03

=== Council ===
==== Ward 1 ====
Candidate	Votes	%
Michael Martin	Acclaimed	

==== Ward 2 ====
Candidate	Votes	%
Will Belyea	140	52.24
Dana Patterson	128	47.76

==== Ward 3 ====
Candidate	Votes	%
Julie Calhoun-Williams	118	43.07
Scott Dunlop	109	39.78
Thomas (Tom) Reid	47	17.15

==== Ward 4 (Note: Each voter was permitted to vote for up to four candidates.) ====
Candidate	Votes	%
Mark Rogers	823	20.70
Jeff Bradbury	777	19.55
Norm Brown	758	19.07
Christa McCartney	600	15.09
Erin Katherine DeLong	521	13.11
Ricky Nicholson	496	12.48

==== Ward 5 ====
Candidate	Votes	%
Lorne Leech	307	71.06
Graham Gill	125	28.94
