= Belle-Baie =

Town in New Brunswick, Canada

- Town
- Town of Belle-Baie
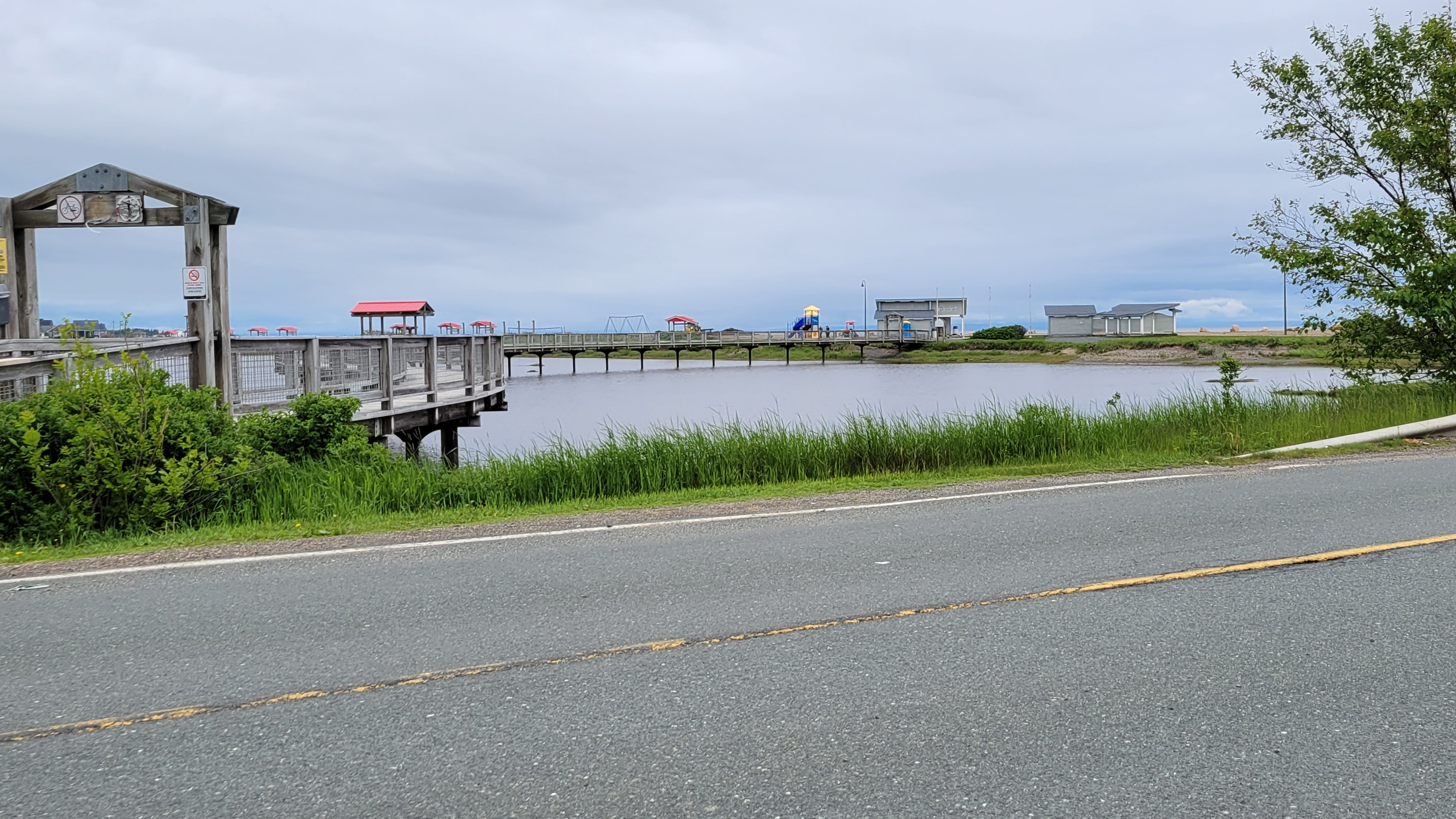
- Waterfront of Belle-Baie, 2023

- Flag

- Location within New Brunswick
- Coordinates: 47°41′42″N 65°42′06″W
- Country: Canada
- Province: New Brunswick
- County: Gloucester
- Regional service commission: Chaleur
- Incorporated: January 1, 2023
- Electoral Districts Federal: Acadie—Bathurst
- Provincial: Belle-Baie-Belledune

Government
  - Type: Town council
  - Mayor: Rachel Boudreau
- Time zone: UTC-4 (AST)
  - Summer (DST): UTC-3 (ADT)
- Postal code(s): E8J, E8K
- Area code: 506
- Highways Route 11 Route 134: Route 315; Route 322
- Website: https://bellebaie.ca/

Belle-Baie (French pronunciation: [bɛl bɛ], lit. 'Beautiful Bay') is a town in the Canadian province of New Brunswick. It was formed through the 2023 New Brunswick local governance reforms.

== History ==
Belle-Baie was incorporated on January 1, 2023, via the amalgamation of the former town of Beresford and the former villages of Nigadoo, Petit-Rocher and Pointe-Verte as well as the concurrent annexation of adjacent unincorporated areas. The adjacent unincorporated areas included the former local service districts of Dunlop, Laplante, Madran, Robertville, Petit-Rocher-Nord, Petit-Rocher-Sud and Tremblay, and portions of the local service districts of Bathurst, Beresford and North Tetagouche.

The new town's name was initially announced as Baie-Jolie sur mer, but after negative reaction from the residents the transition committee withdrew the name and proposed Belle-Baie instead.

The town's language policy for news releases was to be reviewed after some residents complained they were in French only. About 85 per cent of the residents are francophone, 11 percent are anglophone and four percent identify as both. The bilingual rate is 68 percent. Census Canada has not issued information for the new municipality, but these numbers are based on Census 2021 of the municipalities that now form Belle-Baie. When the town was formed, it was designated as French speaking by the transition committee.

== Geography ==
Belle-Baie is just north of the City of Bathurst and is on the shores of Nepisiguit Bay.

== Government ==
The community's first municipal election was held in November 2022 as part of the 2022 New Brunswick municipal elections, with former MLA Daniel Guitard selected as its first mayor.

== Demographics ==
There is no census data on the town of Belle-Baie as the last census was 2021, prior to Belle-Baie being formed. 2021 Census data for the communities that formed Belle-Baie are below.

Estimate Mother Tongue - Belle-Baie, New Brunswick
Census	Total	French			English			French & English			Other		
Source	Responses	Count	Trend	Pop %	Count	Trend	Pop %	Count	Trend	Pop %	Count	Trend	Pop %
Beresford	4,275	3,410	%	79.77%	680	0%	15.91%	135	%	3.16%	50	%	1.17%
Petit-Rocher	1885	1,690	%	89.65%	145	0%	7.69%	35	%	1.85%	20	%	1.06%
Nigadoo	995	870	%	87.43%	95	0%	9.95%	30	%	3.01%	5	%	0.52%
Pointe Verte	845	720	%	85.21%	115	%	13.61%	5	%	0.59%	5	%	0.59%
Beresford parish	6,125	5,370	%	87.67%	590	%	9.43%	145	%	2.37%	20	%	0.32%
Total	14,125	12,060	n/a	85.38%	1,625	n/a	11.50%	350	n/a	2.48%	100	n/a	0.71%

== Attractions ==
One of Belle-Baie's main attractions is its beach. Renovated in the late 1990s, the beach features an observation tower overlooking the marshes, a boardwalk and change room, restroom and shower facilities. A popular tourist attraction, it is not rare to find local musicians featuring their talents at the beach on warm summer nights.

Every year a carnival called "Carnaval du Siffleux" is held in Belle-Baie. Sculptures made of snow collected by ploughing parking lots are presented all around town. This is one of the many activities available to Belle-Baie residents during this carnival. However, in recent years, fewer sculptures have been seen around the time of the festival.

== Notable people ==
- Ray Frenette - Former Premier of New Brunswick.

== See also ==
- List of communities in New Brunswick
- List of municipalities in New Brunswick
