= Chaleur Bay =

Western Arm of the Gulf of Saint Lawrence between Quebec and New Brunswick, Canada

Coordinates: 47°50′N 65°30′W

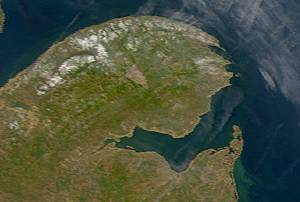
Satellite image of Chaleur Bay (NASA). Chaleur Bay is the large bay in the centre of the image; the Gaspé Peninsula is to the north and the Gulf of St. Lawrence is seen to the east.

Chaleur Bay, also Chaleurs Bay, Bay of Chaleur (in French: Baie des Chaleurs, pronounced [bɛ de ʃalœʁ]), in Mi'gmaq it is called Mawipoqtapei, is an arm of the Gulf of Saint Lawrence located between Quebec and New Brunswick, Canada.

The name of the bay is attributed to explorer Jacques Cartier (Baie des Chaleurs). It translates into English as "bay of warmth" or "bay of torrid weather".

Chaleur Bay is the 31st member of the Most Beautiful Bays of the World Club.

Chaleur Bay is host to an unusual visual phenomenon, the Fireship of Chaleur Bay, an apparition of sorts resembling a ship on fire which has reportedly appeared at several locations in the bay. It is possibly linked to similar sightings several hundred kilometres to the south where the Fireship of Northumberland Strait has been seen in the Northumberland Strait. This may have given rise to a phantom ship legend, which dates back more than two centuries. The story (and witnesses) claim that a sailing ship burned in the waters north of the city of Campbellton, New Brunswick on the Restigouche River, possibly from the Battle of the Restigouche, and is visible in certain weather and light conditions. A drawing of a ghost wielding an anchor and menacing two sailors can be seen on the city's welcome sign.

== Geography ==
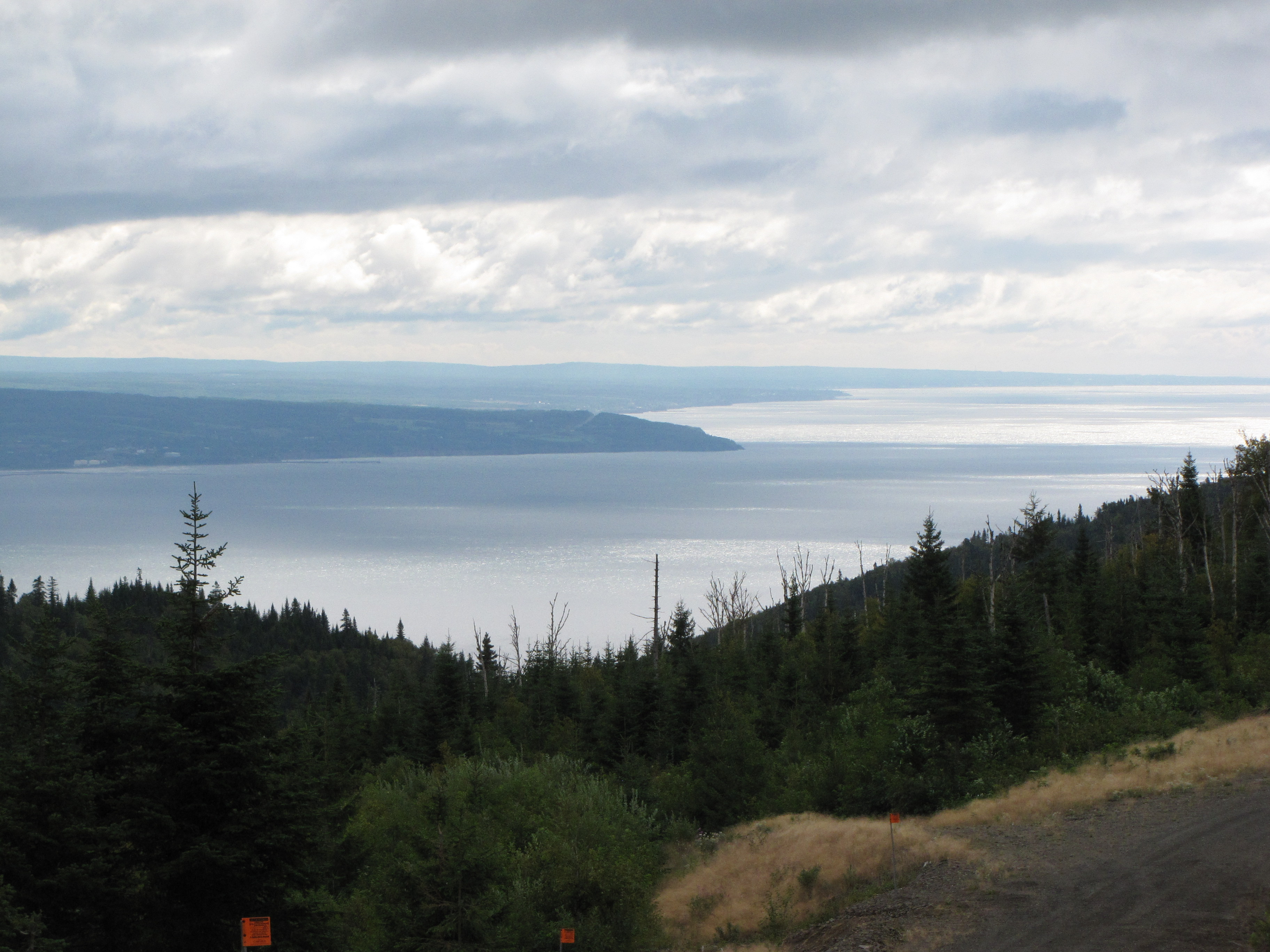
View of Chaleur Bay from Carleton-sur-mer, Quebec

Chaleur Bay opens to the east with its southern shore formed by the north shore of New Brunswick. The northern shore is formed by the south shore of the Gaspé Peninsula. The bay measures approximately 50 km (27 nmi) in width at its widest point between Bathurst and New Carlisle. The western end of the bay transitions into the estuary of the Restigouche River at Dalhousie, New Brunswick.

The mouth of the bay is delineated by a line running from "Haut-fond Leander" near Grande-Rivière, Quebec in the north and the "Miscou Shoals" near Miscou Island, New Brunswick in the south.

Canadian Hydrographic Service chart number 4486 is the bathymetric navigational data repository for the area.

=== Beaches ===
The shores of Chaleur Bay include numerous beaches, particularly in the south. Many rivers also form barachois or barrier beaches. The Eel River Bar is one such beach, located at the mouth of the Eel River, immediately to the west of the village of Charlo, New Brunswick. This sand bar is unique, in that it not only has fresh water on one side and salt water on the other, but it is also home to the endangered piping plover.

Tourism in the region has been driven mainly by beachgoers in the summer months. The warm ocean currents emitting from the larger Gulf of Saint Lawrence result in some of the warmest saltwater on the Atlantic coast north of Virginia.

=== Rivers and Bays ===
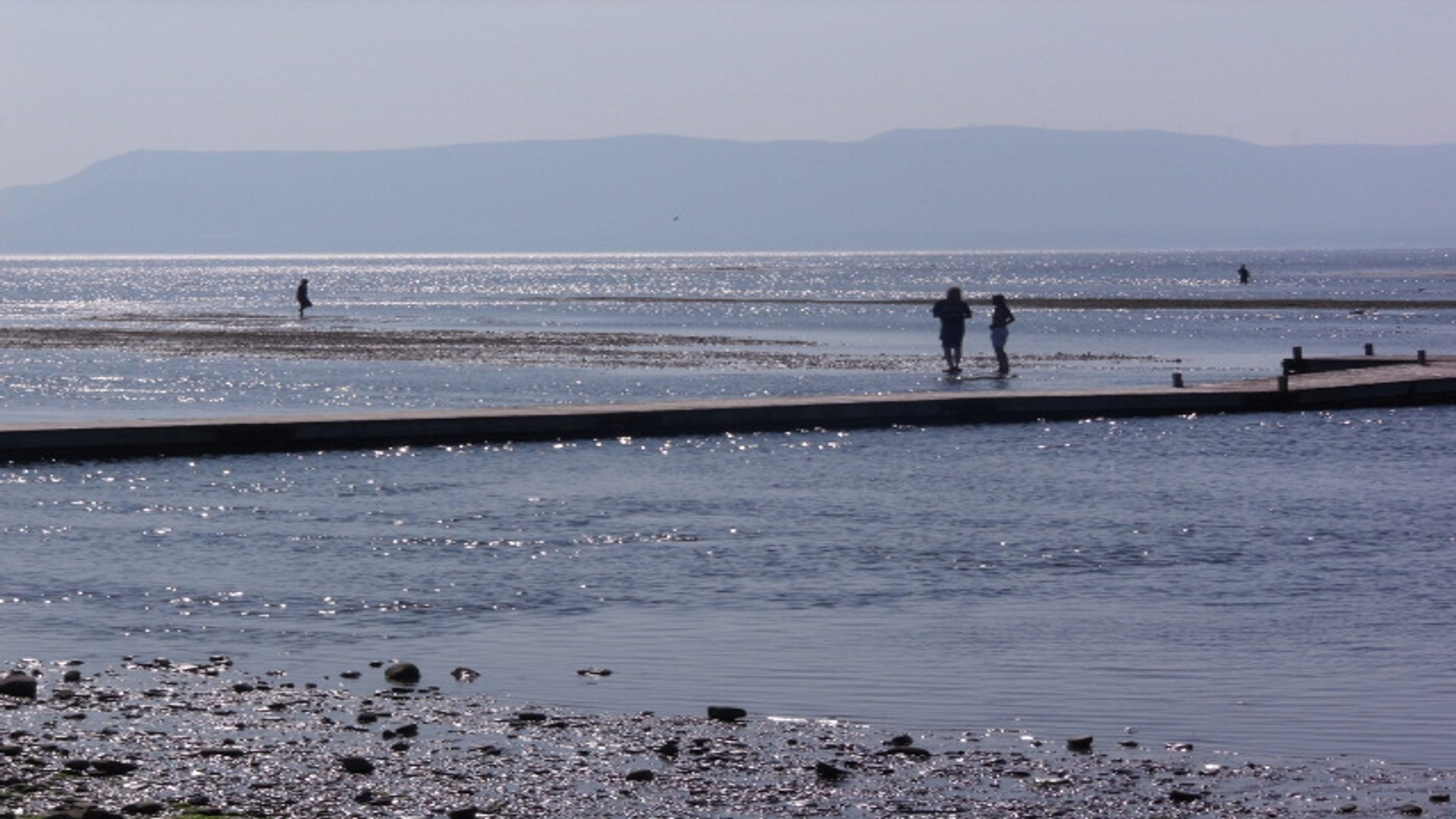
Chaleur Bay at New Richmond, Quebec

The estuaries of various rivers emptying into the bay create a prominent smell of salt water, notably in the estuary of the Restigouche River.

The following major rivers flow into the bay:

Quebec:

- Rivière Matapédia (via the Restigouche)
- Rivière Cascapédia
- Rivière Bonaventure
- Rivière du Grand Pabos
- Rivière du Petit Pabos
- Grande Rivière (Percé)

New Brunswick (from north to south):

- Nepisiguit Bay
- Upsalquitch River (via the Restigouche)
- Eel River
- Charlo River, one of two Maritimes' nesting areas of Harlequin ducks
- Benjamin River, one of two Maritimes' nesting area of Harlequin ducks
- Nash Creek
- Jacquet River
- Elmtree River
- Nigadoo River (Via Nepisiguit Bay)
- Millstream River (Via Nepisiguit Bay)
- Tetagouche River (Via Nepisiguit Bay)
- Middle River (Via Nepisiguit Bay)
- Nepisiguit River (Via Nepisiguit Bay)

Between Quebec and New Brunswick:

- Restigouche River

The Restigouche Estuary was designated (June, 2000) an Important Bird Area of International Significance (the first in New Brunswick) because it is the largest staging area in eastern North America for Black scoter.

- Patapédia River (via the Restigouche)

=== Islands ===
Chaleur Bay has several islands. Although not entirely located within the bay, the northern shores of Miscou Island and Lameque Island form part of the southern shore of the bay. Heron Island lies near Dalhousie, New Brunswick and is located south of Carleton-sur-Mer, Quebec.

=== Climate ===
The bay's shape and the steep cliffs along its northern shore sometimes create particularly windy conditions especially off Nepisiguit Bay. Under the right wind direction and speed, sea conditions on large areas of the bay can become quite treacherous. Tidal currents are generally weak, except at the mouths of some rivers and certain channels. Its configuration tends to channel the wind for two reasons: the steep cliffs on its North side, and its V shape. This means that in the middle of this section, off Nepisiguit Bay, there is a zone that is particularly windy and subject to high seas if the wind is from the Northwest or the Northeast.

Tidal currents in this section rarely reach one knot, except at the mouths of some rivers and some channels.

== History ==
In chapter X of his Récits de voyages en nouvelle-france (1603-1632), French navigator, explorer, and colonizer, Samuel de Champlain, describes the Baie des Chaleurs and its coastal environs. His account, from the summer of 1603, suggests interactions with resident Mi’kmaq, who provided information about the region. During this excursion, Champlain’s party passed by Île Bonaventure on his ship’s entry into the bay.

Immigration from the Isle of Arran, Scotland: Bryce's The Geology of Arran 1855 notes: "Many years ago, a large population, the largest then collected in any one spot in [the island of] Arran, inhabited [Sannox] glen, and gained a scanty subsistence by fishing and by cultivating fertile plots on the sunny hill-sides. In 1832, the whole of the families amounting to 500 persons, were obliged [in the Scottish Highland Clearances] to leave the island, but were furnished with the means of reaching New Brunswick. They formed a settlement at Chaleur Bay, which became very prosperous".

The eastern end of Chaleur Bay was the site of the Royal Canadian Navy's Operation Pointe Maisonnette in September 1943, during the Battle of the St. Lawrence.

== Fauna ==
Chaleur Bay is home to a variety of marine life including numerous species of ground fish and shellfish such as lobster and scallops.

Additionally, many of the bay's pristine rivers support some of the largest wild Atlantic Salmon remaining in the north Atlantic Ocean, creating a haven for sport angling.

While whale watching including endangered targets such as Fin whales are popular attractions in the bay, North Atlantic right whales, one of the rarest whales and had been considered to be rare in Gulf of St. Lawrence region, were recently confirmed to be present in Chaleur Bay more often in recent years.

== In literature ==
Chaleur Bay is mentioned in John Greenleaf Whittier's poem, "Skipper Ireson's Ride."
