= Albert Doucet =

Canadian politician and businessman

Albert Doucet (born November 4, 1942) is a businessman and former political figure in New Brunswick, Canada. He represented Nigadoo-Chaleur in the Legislative Assembly of New Brunswick from 1991 to 1999 as an Independent, then Liberal and then Independent member.

He was born in Bathurst, New Brunswick, the son of Albert Doucet Sr. and Martha Lavigne, and educated at the Université du Sacré-Coeur and the Collège de Bathurst. Doucet was personnel director for a fertilizer company before founding his own company in 1976. He later became a real estate agent. Doucet was also a member of the local school board and chairman of the Chaleur Regional Development Commission from 1989 to 2001. He married Noella Roy. He served as Minister of State for Mines & Energy from 1995 to 1997. Doucet resigned this position in 1997 and was suspended from the Liberal caucus after publicly criticizing the government. Doucet has served as a member of the board of directors for the Belledune Port Authority since 2005.
