= Beresford, New Brunswick =

Former Town in New Brunswick

Beresford
- Dissolved Town
- Town of Beresford
- Seal
- Motto: "Simul Crescere"
- Location within New Brunswick.
- Coordinates: 47.695°N 65.701666°W
- Country: Canada
- Province: New Brunswick
- County: Gloucester
- Parish: Beresford
- Founded: 1814
- Incorporated: 1967
- Town: 1984
- Dissolved: January 1, 2023
- Electoral Districts Federal: Acadie—Bathurst
- Provincial: Nigadoo-Chaleur

Area
  - Land: 19.24 km^{2} (7.43 sq mi)
- Elevation: 5 m (16 ft)
- Highest elevation: 10 m (33 ft)
- Lowest elevation: 0 m (0 ft)

Population (2021)
  - Total: 4,294
  - Density: 223.2/km^{2} (578/sq mi)
  - Pop 2016-2021: ▲0.1%
  - Dwellings: 2,225
- Time zone: UTC-4 (AST)
  - Summer (DST): UTC-3 (ADT)
- Postal code: E8K
- Area code: 506
- Highways Route 11: Route 134
- Website: www.beresford.ca

Beresford was a town from 1984 to 2023 but was dissolved in 2023 as a result of amalgamation to form the new town of Belle-Baie. The name Beresford is retained for addresses purposes.

== History ==
On January 1, 2023, Beresford amalgamated with three villages, seven local service districts (LSDs) and parts of three other LSDs to form the new town of Belle-Baie.

In March 1813, the municipal council of Northumberland decided to regroup the territories north of Miramichi into two districts: one being from Neguac to Pokemouche, the other from Caraquet and including the whole north-east region of New Brunswick. In 1814, this re-organisation continued and the territory was subdivided into parishes. Some examples of those were Alnwick (Neguac and Tabusintac), Saumarez (from Tracadie to Caraquet), and Beresford (from Nepisiguit to Restigouche).

Names were then given to these new civil parishes honouring naval and military men (Nelson, Wellington, and Carleton, for Thomas Carleton). Beresford was named for the British general William Beresford, 1st Viscount Beresford, who commanded the Portuguese troops that were part of Wellington's army in the Peninsular War from 1808 to 1814.

== Geography ==
It is on the shore of Nepisiguit Bay, part of Chaleur Bay immediately north of the city of Bathurst.

== Demographics ==
In the 2021 Census of Population conducted by Statistics Canada, Beresford had a population of 4,294 living in 2,013 of its 2,225 total private dwellings, a change of 0.1% from its 2016 population of 4,288. With a land area of 19.24 km^{2} (7.43 sq mi), it had a population density of 223.2/km^{2} (578.0/sq mi) in 2021.

Canada census – Beresford community profile

	2021	2016	2011
Population	4,294 (+0.1% from 2016)	4,288 (-1.4% from 2011)	4,351 (+2.0% from 2006)
Land area	19.24 km^{2} (7.43 sq mi)	19.41 km^{2} (7.49 sq mi)	19.20 km^{2} (7.41 sq mi)
Population density	223.2/km^{2} (578/sq mi)	220.9/km^{2} (572/sq mi)	226.6/km^{2} (587/sq mi)
Median age	54.4 (M: 54.0, F: 54.4)	50.2 (M: 50.1, F: 50.4)	46.5 (M: 46.7, F: 46.4)
Private dwellings	2,225 (total) 2,013 (occupied)	2,150 (total)	2,067 (total)
Median household income	$66,500	$59,136	$55,118

References: 2021 2016 2011

Historical Census Data - Beresford, New Brunswick

Year	Pop.	±%
1991	3,836	—
1996	4,641	+21.0%
2001	4,414	−4.9%

Year	Pop.	±%
2001A	4,439	+0.6%
2006	4,264	−3.9%
2011	4,351	+2.0%

Year	Pop.	±%
2016	4,288	−1.4%

(A) adjustment due to boundary change

79% of the former town's residents are francophone.

=== Language ===
Canada Census Mother Tongue - Beresford, New Brunswick
Census	Total	French			English			French & English			Other		
Year	Responses	Count	Trend	Pop %	Count	Trend	Pop %	Count	Trend	Pop %	Count	Trend	Pop %
2021	4,275	3,410	▼2.29%	79.77%	680	0%	15.91%	135	▲107.69%	3.16%	50	▲42.86%	1.17%
2016	4,275	3,490	▼2.65%	81.64%	680	0%	15.91%	65	▲44.4%	1.52%	35	▲133.33%	0.80%
2011	4,325	3,585	▼0.3%	82.89%	680	▲20.4%	15.72%	45	▲50.0%	1.04%	15	▼70.0%	0.35%
2006	4,240	3,595	▲0.6%	84.79%	565	▼29.4%	13.32%	30	▲100.0%	0.71%	50	▲233.3%	1.18%
2001	4,405	3,575	▼6.4%	81.16%	800	▲2.6%	18.16%	15	▼78.6%	0.34%	15	▼66.7%	0.34%
1996	4,715	3,820	n/a	81.02%	780	n/a	16.54%	70	n/a	1.48%	45	n/a	0.95%

== Attractions ==
One of Beresford's main attractions is its beach. Renovated in the late 1990s, the beach features an observation tower overlooking the marshes, a boardwalk and change room, restroom and shower facilities. A popular tourist attraction, it is not rare to find local musicians featuring their talents at the beach on warm summer nights.

Every year a carnival called "Carnaval du Siffleux" is held in Beresford. Sculptures made of snow collected by ploughing parking lots are presented all around town. This is one of the many activities available to Beresford residents during this carnival. However, in recent years, fewer sculptures have been seen around the time of the festival.

== Notable people ==
- Ray Frenette - Former Premier of New Brunswick.

== See also ==
- List of communities in New Brunswick
