= Pointe-Verte, New Brunswick =

Former Village in New Brunswick

Pointe-Verte
- (Dissolved village)
- Location within New Brunswick.
- Coordinates: 47°51′N 65°46′W
- Country: Canada
- Province: New Brunswick
- County: Gloucester
- Parish: Beresford
- Town: Dissolved
- Village: 1966

Area
  - Land: 13.76 km^{2} (5.31 sq mi)
- Elevation: 11 m (36 ft)

Population (2021)
  - Total: 865
  - Density: 62.9/km^{2} (163/sq mi)
  - Change 2016–21: ▼2.4%
  - Dwellings: 433
- Time zone: UTC-4 (AST)
  - Summer (DST): UTC-3 (ADT)
- Postal code: E8J
- Area code: 506
- Highways: Route 134 Route 11
- Website: www.pointe-verte.ca

Pointe-Verte (English: Green Point) was a village and was dissolved January 1, 2023, when it amalgamated with other municipalities to form the town of Belle-Baie in Gloucester County, New Brunswick.

== History ==
On January 1, 2023, Pointe-Verte amalgamated with Beresford, Nigadoo, Petit-Rocher, and all or part of ten local service districts to form the new town of Belle-Baie. The community's name remains in official use.

== Geography ==
Located on Nepisiguit Bay 30 km north of Bathurst, the village's main industry is lobster and scallop fishing, as well as forestry.

== Demographics ==
Historical Census Data - Pointe-Verte, New Brunswick
Year	Pop.	±%
1996	1,122	—
2001	1,041	−7.2%
2006	971	−6.7%
2011	976	+0.5%
2016	886	−9.2%
2021	865	−2.4%

In the 2021 Census of Population conducted by Statistics Canada, Pointe-Verte had a population of 865 living in 400 of its 433 total private dwellings, a change of −2.4% from its 2016 population of 886. With a land area of 13.76 km^{2} (5.31 sq mi), it had a population density of 62.9/km^{2} (162.8/sq mi) in 2021.

Canada census – Pointe-Verte community profile

	2021	2016	2011
Population	865 (-2.4% from 2016)	886 (-9.2% from 2011)	976 (+0.5% from 2006)
Land area	13.76 km^{2} (5.31 sq mi)	13.76 km^{2} (5.31 sq mi)	13.79 km^{2} (5.32 sq mi)
Population density	62.9/km^{2} (163/sq mi)	64.4/km^{2} (167/sq mi)	70.8/km^{2} (183/sq mi)
Median age	58 (M: 57.2, F: 58)	54.8 (M: 54.4, F: 55.1)	51.8 (M: 51.9, F: 51.6)
Private dwellings	400 (total)	410 (total)	464 (total)
Median household income		$55,168	$57,766

References: 2021 2016 2011

=== Language ===
Canada Census Mother Tongue - Pointe-Verte, New Brunswick
Census	Total	French			English			French & English			Other		
Year	Responses	Count	Trend	Pop %	Count	Trend	Pop %	Count	Trend	Pop %	Count	Trend	Pop %
2021	845	720	▼8.28%	85.21%	115	▲35.29%	13.61%	5	▼66.66%	0.59%	5	0.0%	0.05%
2016	885	785	▼9.24%	88.70%	85	▲6.25%	9.6%	15	▲50.0%	1.69%	5	▲0.0%	0.5%
2011	955	865	▼2.8%	90.57%	80	▲45.5%	8.38%	10	0.0%	1.05%	0	0.0%	0.00%
2006	955	890	▼6.8%	93.19%	55	▼26.7%	5.76%	10	0.0%	1.05%	0	0.0%	0.00%
2001	1,040	955	▼11.2%	91.83%	75	▲66.7%	7.21%	10	▲ n/a%	0.96%	0	0.0%	0.00%
1996	1,120	1,075	n/a	95.98%	45	n/a	4.02%	0	n/a	0.00%	0	n/a	0.00%

== See also ==
- List of communities in New Brunswick
