= Petit-Rocher, New Brunswick =

Former village in New Brunswick, Canada

Petit-Rocher
- Former village
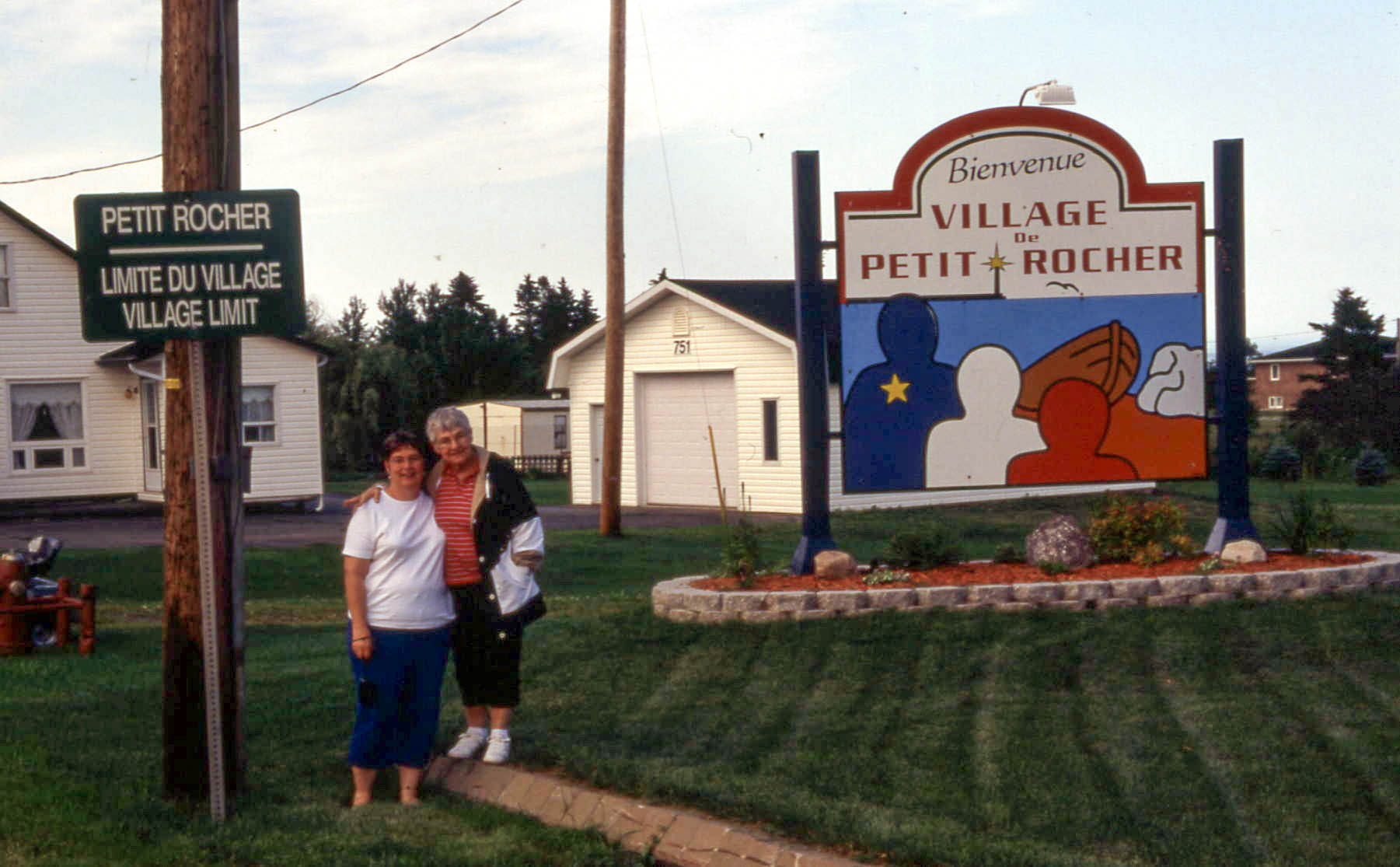
- Petit-Rocher welcome sign

- Seal
- Motto: Ascencio Populi
- Location within New Brunswick
- Coordinates: 47°47′36″N 65°42′58″W
- Country: Canada
- Province: New Brunswick
- County: Gloucester
- Parish: Beresford
- Founded: 1797
- Village: 1966
- Dissolved: 2023

Area
  - Total: 4.52 km^{2} (1.75 sq mi)

Population (2021)
  - Total: 1,954
  - Density: 432.2/km^{2} (1,119/sq mi)
- Time zone: UTC-4 (AST)
  - Summer (DST): UTC-3 (ADT)
- Postal code: E8J
- Area code: 506
- Highways: Route 11, Route 134, Route 315

Petit-Rocher (French pronunciation: [pəti ʁɔʃe]; meaning “little rock”) is a former village in Gloucester County, New Brunswick, Canada. On January 1, 2023, it was dissolved as an incorporated village and became part of the new town of Belle-Baie following province-wide local government reforms. The name Petit-Rocher is still retained for Address purposes.

The community is located on the western shore of Nepisiquit Bay, approximately 20 kilometres north of Bathurst. Prior to amalgamation, it was bordered by the former local service districts of Petit-Rocher-Nord (Devereaux) to the north and Petit-Rocher-Sud to the south.

== History ==
Petit-Rocher was founded in 1797 by Acadian settlers. The name refers to a small rocky outcrop along the shoreline and is of French origin. During the 19th century, the settlement appeared under several names, including Little Roche and Madisco, before Petit Rocher became the standard form. The hyphenated spelling Petit-Rocher was officially adopted in 2009.

As part of New Brunswick’s local governance reform, Petit-Rocher amalgamated with Beresford, Nigadoo, Pointe-Verte, and surrounding local service districts to form the town of Belle-Baie on January 1, 2023.

== Demographics ==
In the 2021 Canadian census, Petit-Rocher recorded a population of 1,954 residents living in 890 of its 963 private dwellings, representing a slight increase from the 2016 census. With a land area of 4.52 km², the population density was 432.2 people per square kilometre.

Canada Census Mother Tongue

Canada Census Mother Tongue - Petit-Rocher, New Brunswick
Census	Total	French			English			French & English			Other		
Year	Responses	Count	Trend	Pop %	Count	Trend	Pop %	Count	Trend	Pop %	Count	Trend	Pop %
2021	1,885	1,690	▼0.05%	89.65%	145	▲26.08%	7.69%	35	▲75.0%	1.85%	20	0.0%	1.06%
2016	1,885	1,700	▼2.85%	90.18%	115	▲15.00%	6.10%	20	▼1.06%	1.33%	20	▲0.0%	1.06%
2011	1,875	1,750	▼4.4%	93.33%	100	▲42.9%	5.33%	25	▲25.0%	1.33%	0	0.0%	0.00%
2006	1,920	1,830	▲1.9%	95.31%	70	▼44.0%	3.65%	20	0.0%	1.04%	0	0.0%	0.00%
2001	1,940	1,795	▼8.2%	92.53%	125	▲38.9%	6.44%	20	▲100.0%	1.03%	0	▼100.0%	0.00%
1996	2,065	1,955	n/a	94.67%	90	n/a	4.36%	10	n/a	0.48%	10	n/a	0.48%

== Transportation ==
Petit-Rocher is served by the Ocean passenger train operated by VIA Rail, which runs between Montreal and Halifax. The station operates as a flag stop and is located west of the community. A replica station building was constructed in 2010 following the demolition of the original station in 1990.

== Tourism ==
Petit-Rocher has hosted regional sporting and cultural events, including tournaments organized by the Campbellton–Chaleur Ball Hockey Association during the early 2010s.

== See also ==
- List of communities in New Brunswick
- List of lighthouses in New Brunswick
