= Nepisiguit Bay =

Bay in New Brunswick, Canada

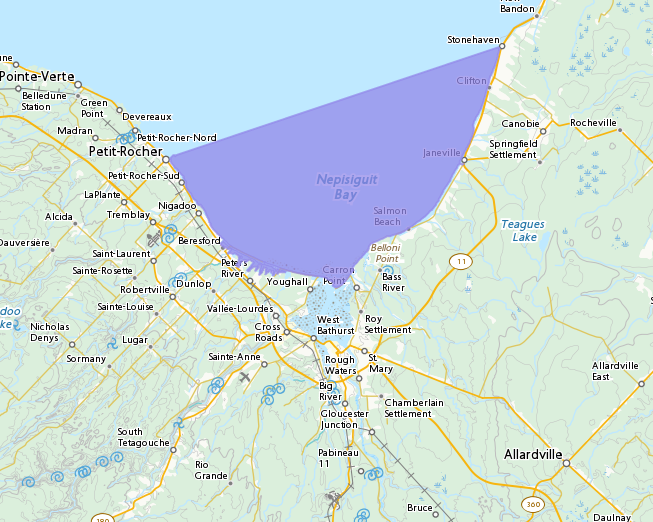

- Location within New Brunswick
- Coordinates: 47.6938°N 65.5330°W
- Part of: Chaleur Bay
- Primary inflows: Peters River, Millstream River, Tetagouche River, Middle River, Nepisiguit River, Little River

Nepisiguit Bay (from the Mi’kmaq word winpegijawik, which means "rough water") is located in northern New Brunswick, Canada on the southern part of the Chaleur Bay (French: Baie des Chaleurs), which extends from the Atlantic Ocean and Nepisiguit Bay is a southern arm of it, stretching between Petit-Rocher and Stonehaven.

The current site of the city of Bathurst was a summer home of the Mi’kmaq First Nation that they called Nepisiguit. The first Permanent Europeans settlers from France arrived in 1619. Commodore George Walker, a successful British privateer, set up a fishing and trading operation on the Nepisiguit Bay in 1768 at the present day location of Youghall Park. These installations were later destroyed in 1778 by American Pirates. Fishing operations did not resume until 1784 when Colonel Arthur Goold received most of the Eastern shore of Nepisiguit Bay forcing Acadian Settlers to settle on the Western shore of the Bay. Hugh Munro arrived in Nepisiguit area in 1794 and began a Merchant and Fish operations later expanding into lumbering. By 1818, he claimed his operation was the longest serving one in the Nepisiguit Bay. By that time, he was building ships, employing many people.

Nepisiguit Bay is a popular spot in summer with cottages lining both sides of the bay. Both Youghall Beach in Bathurst and Beresford beach are both popular destinations for locals over the summer months.

== Coastal communities ==
Nepisiguit Bay is home to a number of coastal communities.

- City of Bathurst
- Town of Belle-Baie
- LSD of New Bandon-Salmon Beach
- Community Janeville

== Rivers ==
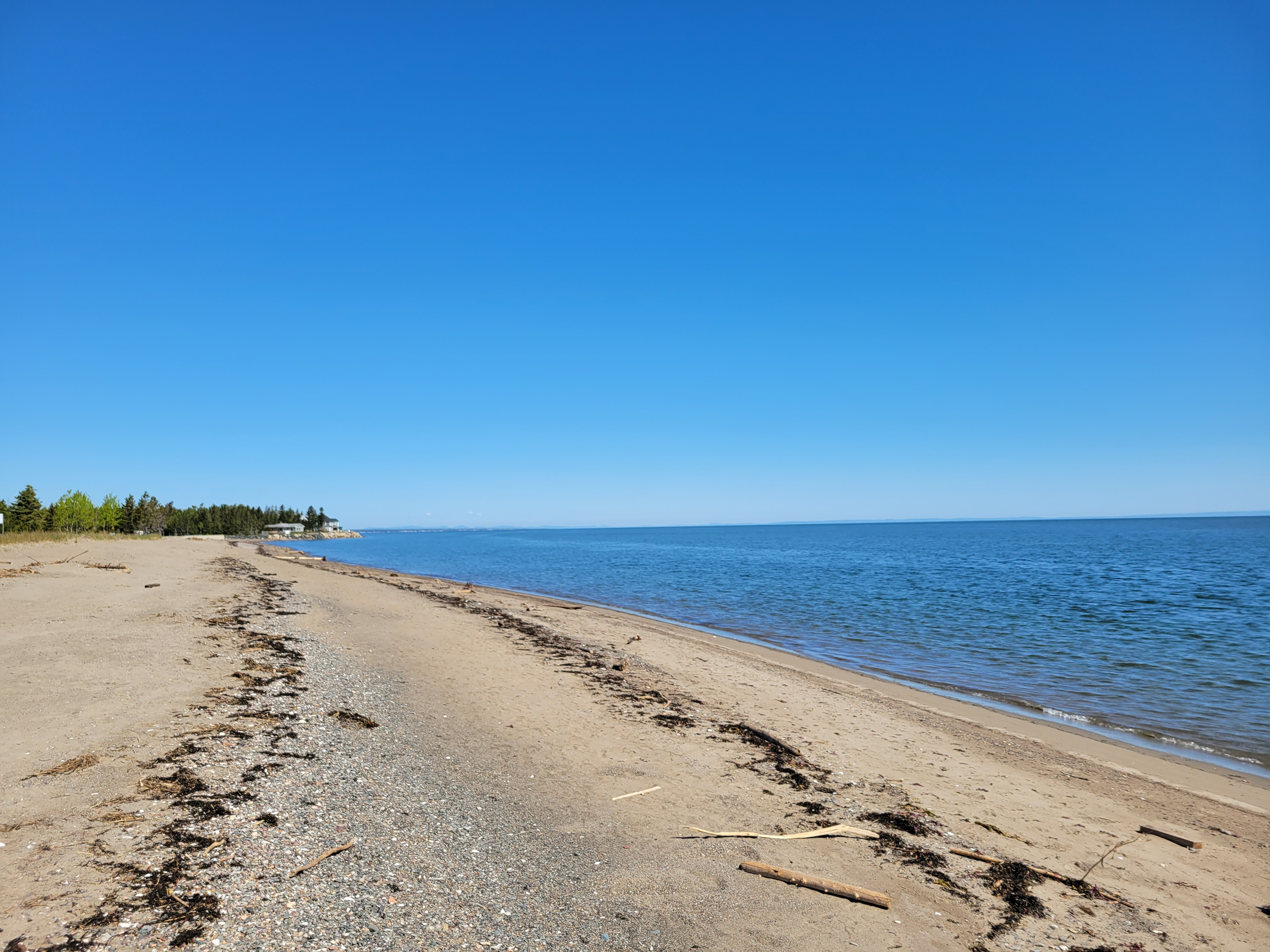
View of Nepisiguit Bay looking North West from Youghall Beach

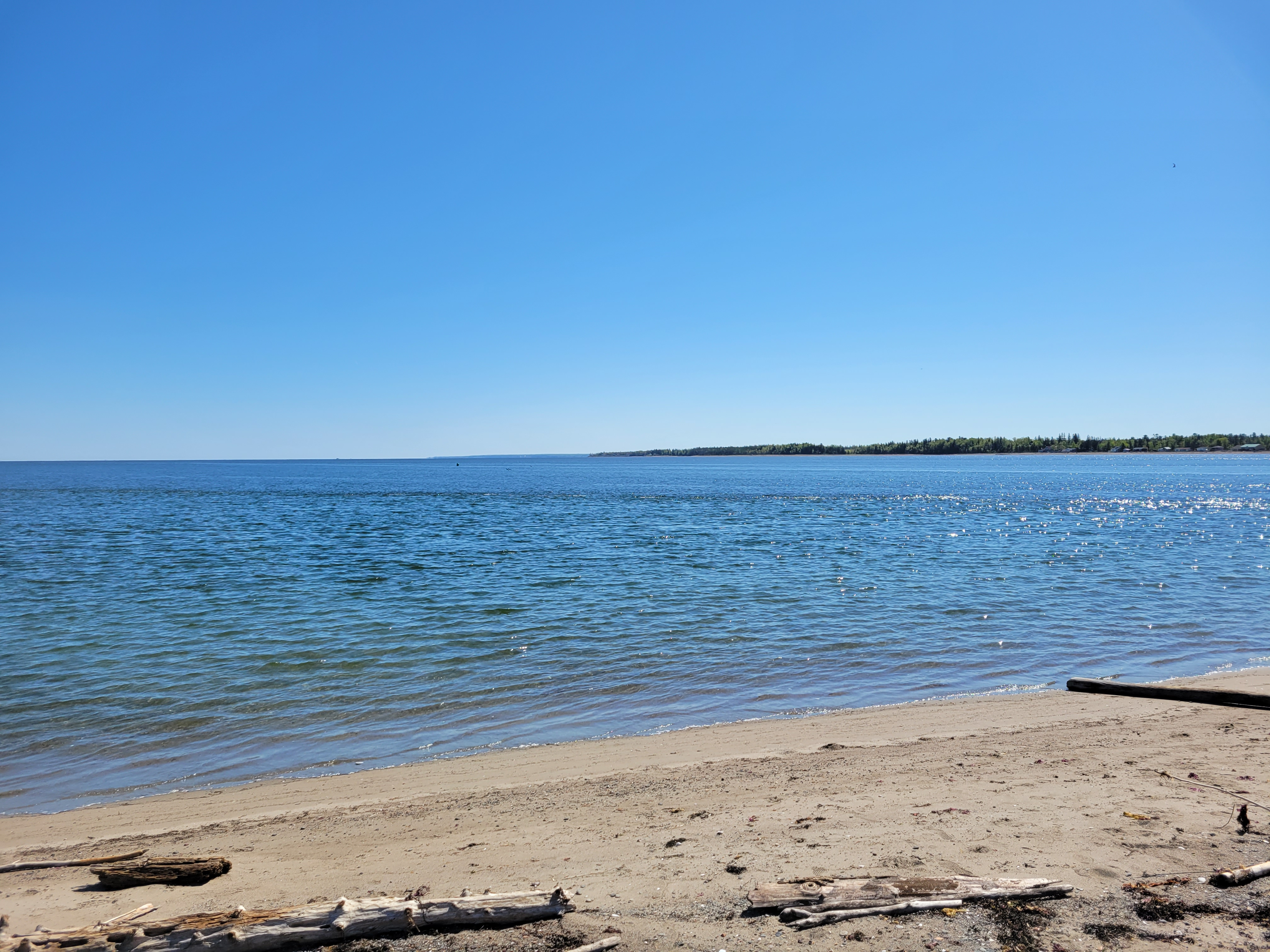
View of Nepisiguit Bay looking North East from Youghall Beach

The following rivers flow into the bay:

- Peters River
- Millstream River
- Tetagouche River
- Middle River
- Nepisiguit River
- Little River
