= Allardville Parish =

Allardville
- Parish
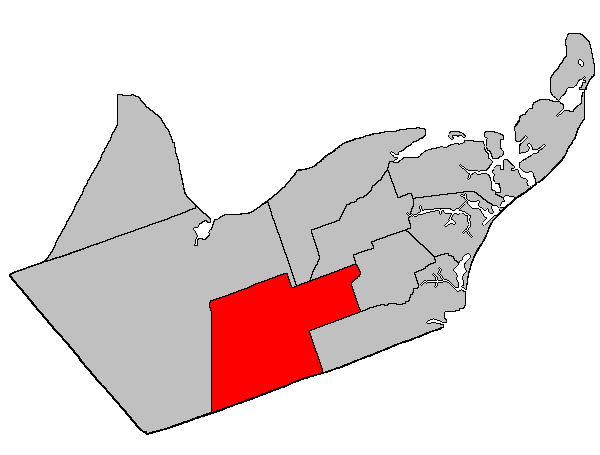
- Location within Gloucester County, New Brunswick
- Coordinates: 47.48°N 65.5°W
- Country: Canada
- Province: New Brunswick
- County: Gloucester
- Erected: 1947

Area
  - Land: 654.60 km^{2} (252.74 sq mi)

Population (2021)
  - Total: 1,949
  - Density: 3/km^{2} (7.8/sq mi)
  - Change 2016-2021: ▼4.1%
  - Dwellings: 919
- Time zone: UTC-4 (AST)
  - Summer (DST): UTC-3 (ADT)

Allardville is a geographic parish in Gloucester County, New Brunswick, Canada, (Note: The Territorial Division Act divides the province into 152 parishes, the cities of Saint John and Fredericton, and one town of Grand Falls. The Interpretation Act clarifies that parishes include any local government within their borders.)

It is divided for governance purposes into the town of Hautes-Terres in the east and the Chaleur rural district in the west. Hautes-Terres is a member of the Acadian Peninsula Regional Service Commission and the Chaleur RD is a member of the Chaleur RSC.

Prior to the 2023 governance reform, the Hautes-Terres portion formed the local service district of Saint-Sauveur, while the Chaleur RD portion formed the LSD of the parish of Allardville.

== Origin of name ==
The parish was named in honour of Monsignor Jean-Joseph-Auguste Allard, who brought new settlers from the East Bathurst area in 1932.

== History ==
Allardville was erected in 1947 from parts of Bathurst, Saint-Isidore, and Saumarez Parishes. This was the last new parish to be erected in New Brunswick.

== Boundaries ==
Allardville Parish is bounded:

- on the west by the Canadian National Railway line;
- on the north by the southern line of two land grants south of Goodwin Mill Road, prolonged southwesterly to the CNR line and northeasterly to the Tracadie Game Management Area, then taking a right-angle turn to the rear line Tier 1 of the Allardville East Settlement, which runs along the north side of Route 160, before turning northeasterly and following the rear of Tier 1 and its prolongation to about midway between Redpine Brook and Lac St. Coeur;
- on the east by a line southerly from midway between Redpine Brook and Lac St. Coeur along the prolongation of grant lines until it strikes the rear of Range 5 of the Saint Isidore Settlement, which runs along the north side of a different section of Route 160, then along Range 5 to midway between Butte-d'Or Road and the dogleg of Route 160 connecting the sections in Tier 1 and Range 5, then southerly at a right angle along grant lines at the end of Saint Isidore Settlement and their prolongation to the prolongation of the rear line of Range 9 of the Saint Isidore Settlement, which runs along the south side of Rang 9 Road;
- on the south by the prolongation of the rear line of Range 9 southwesterly past the Little South Branch Big Tracadie River to the line between Blocks 3 and 4 of Range 9 of timberland, then at a right angle southerly to the Northumberland County line, then westerly along the county line to the CNR line.

== Former governance ==
The parish's two LSDs sat side-by-side, with the boundary running northwesterly along grant lines about 8.1 kilometres easterly of the junction of Route 134 and Route 160 and prolongated northwesterly and southeasterly to the parish line. Both LSDs assessed for street lighting and community & recreation services in addition to basic LSD services.

Saint-Sauveur (established 1985) was the eastern LSD, taking its name from its westernmost community. The population in 2016 was 673.

Allardville (established 1999) was the western LSD. This LSD actually extends north to included part of Bathurst Parish; census data does not profile the extended area. Allardville was formed by merging three previous entities:

- The parish of Allardville (established 1969) originally included the entire parish and allowed residents to assess for fire protection.
- Allardville Centre (established 1970) comprised about 650 hectares north and south of the junction of Route 134 and Route 160; it added street lighting to the area.
- Allardville Nord (established 1991) was an area with enhanced services that straddled the Allardville-Bathurst parish line, which added street lighting to the area.

== Governance reform ==
Governance reforms planned for 2023 would move Saint-Sauveur to the Acadian Peninsula Regional Service Commission, where it would form a local government entity with the villages of Paquetville and Saint-Isidore and the LSDs of the parish of Paquetville and the parish of Saint-Isidore. Allardville would remain part of the Chaleur RSC and be included in its rural district. These reforms are scheduled to take effect in 2023.

== Communities ==
Communities at least partly within the parish; (brackets) indicate the LSD; italics indicate a name not used on modern provincial government maps

- Allardville (A) is a community at the junction of Route 134 and Route 160
- Allardville East (A) is located on Route 160, east of Allardville
- Beaubois is now part of Saint-Sauveur
- Butte-d'Or (SS) is along Route 363 near the eastern parish line
- Daulnay (A) is along Route 134, south of Allardville
- Jeanne-Mance (A) is along Route 134 and the southernmost community in the parish
- Pokemouche Landing (SS) is along Route 160, near the eastern parish line
- Rang-St-Sauveur is now part of Saint-Sauveur
- Saint-Sauveur (SS) is along Route 160 between Allardville East and Butte-d'Or
- railway points along the western edge of the parish: Bartibog Station, Bruce Siding, Red Pine, Russell

== Bodies of water ==
Bodies of water (Note: Not including brooks, ponds or coves.) at least partly within the parish.

- Bartibog River
- Bass River
- Big Eskedelloc River
- Big Tracadie River
- Little Bass River
- Little Eskedelloc River
- Tabusintac River
- Bass River Lake
- East Branch Lake

== Conservation areas ==
Parks, historic sites, and related entities at least partly within the parish.

- Allardville Protected Natural Area
- Bass Brook Protected Natural Area
- Bass River Protected Natural Area
- East Branch Portage River Protected Natural Area
- Lord and Foy Brook Protected Natural Area
- Pisiguit Brook Protected Natural Area
- Red Pine Brook Protected Natural Area
- Tabusintac River Protected Natural Area
- Tracadie River Game Management Area

== Demographics ==
=== Population ===
Revised census figures based on the 2023 local governance reforms have not been released.

Canada census – Allardville community profile

	2021	2016	2011
Population	1,949 (-4.1% from 2016)	2,032 (-2.4% from 2011)	2,081 (-3.3% from 2006)
Land area	654.60 km^{2} (252.74 sq mi)	654.69 km^{2} (252.78 sq mi)	655.21 km^{2} (252.98 sq mi)
Population density	3/km^{2} (7.8/sq mi)	3.1/km^{2} (8.0/sq mi)	3.2/km^{2} (8.3/sq mi)
Median age	53.6 (M: 53.2, F: 54.0)	49.6 (M: 48.7, F: 50.6)	47.0 (M: 46.3, F: 48.0)
Private dwellings	919 (total) 878 (occupied)	932 (total)	909 (total)
Median household income	$58,400	$52,779	$43,501

References: 2021 2016 2011

Historical Census Data - Allardville Parish, New Brunswick

Year	Pop.	±%
1991	2,848	—
1996	2,742	−3.7%

Year	Pop.	±%
2001	2,450	−10.6%
2006	2,151	−12.2%

Year	Pop.	±%
2011	2,081	−3.3%
2016	2,032	−2.4%

=== Language ===
Canada Census Mother Tongue – Allardville Parish, New Brunswick
Census	Total	French			English			French & English			Other		
Year	Responses	Count	Trend	Pop %	Count	Trend	Pop %	Count	Trend	Pop %	Count	Trend	Pop %
2011	2,060	1,970	▼3.0%	95.63%	65	0.0%	3.16%	25	▲ n/a%	1.21%	0	▼100.0%	0.00%
2006	2,135	2,030	▼11.9%	95.08%	65	▼45.8%	3.04%	0	▼100.0%	0.00%	40	▲ n/a%	1.87%
2001	2,440	2,305	▼12.0%	94.47%	120	0.0%	4.92%	15	▲50.0%	0.61%	0	0.0%	0.00%
1996	2,750	2,620	n/a	95.27%	120	n/a	4.36%	10	n/a	0.36%	0	n/a	0.00%

== See also ==
- List of parishes in New Brunswick
