= List of historic places in Gloucester County, New Brunswick =

This article is a list of historic places in Gloucester County, New Brunswick entered on the Canadian Register of Historic Places, whether they are federal, provincial, or municipal.

== List of historic places ==
| Name | Address | Coordinates | Government recognition (CRHP №) | Wikidata ID | Image |
|---|---|---|---|---|---|
| Captain Albert House | 26 Des Robins Street; Caraquet NB | 47°47′37″N 64°56′02″W | Caraquet municipality (8013) | | |
| Albertine Basque House | 502 Georges Street West; Tracadie-Sheila NB | 47°30′57″N 64°54′59″W | Tracadie-Sheila municipality (5982) | | Upload Photo |
| Arseneau House | 3459 Albert Street; Tracadie-Sheila NB | 47°31′06″N 64°54′50″W | Tracadie-Sheila municipality (6638) | | Upload Photo |
| Rosa Assaff Building | 470 Main Street; Bathurst NB | 47°37′06″N 65°38′45″W | Bathurst municipality (10407) | | Upload Photo |
| Assumption Academy | 1255 Rough Water Drive; Bathurst NB | 47°36′35″N 65°37′59″W | Bathurst municipality (5237) | | Upload Photo |
| Baldwin House | 393 King Avenue; Bathurst NB | 47°37′06″N 65°39′09″W | Bathurst municipality (15125) | | Upload Photo |
| Bathurst Curling Club | 209 St. Andrew Street; Bathurst NB | 47°37′06″N 65°39′08″W | Bathurst municipality (5443) | | Upload Photo |
| Théotime Blanchard House | 279 St-Pierre-Ouest Boulevard; Caraquet NB | 47°47′08″N 64°58′25″W | Caraquet municipality (8000) | Q130339835 | More images |
| Block Wharf | De La Block Street; Tracadie-Sheila NB | 47°31′41″N 64°53′37″W | Tracadie-Sheila municipality (10500) | | Upload Photo |
| Boîte à Fleurs | 3375 Principale Street; Tracadie-Sheila NB | 47°31′22″N 64°54′39″W | Tracadie-Sheila municipality (5980) | | |
| Dr. Bourgeois House | 3572 Principale Street; Tracadie-Sheila NB | 47°30′50″N 64°54′38″W | Tracadie-Sheila municipality (8173) | | Upload Photo |
| Café Royal | 248 J. D. Gauthier Boulevard; Shippagan NB | 47°44′37″N 64°42′26″W | Shippagan municipality (14745) | | |
| Caraquet Convent | Saint-Pierre-Ouest Boulevard; Caraquet NB | 47°47′24″N 64°57′55″W | Caraquet municipality (7946) | | |
| Causeway Park | Main Street running into Queen Street; Bathurst NB | 47°37′13″N 65°39′32″W | Bathurst municipality (12184) | | Upload Photo |
| Château d'Acadie | 3559 Principale Street; Tracadie-Sheila NB | 47°30′52″N 64°54′41″W | Tracadie-Sheila municipality (7111) | Q117384819 | More images |
| Collège de Caraquet Site | 220 St-Pierre-Ouest Boulevard; Caraquet NB | 47°47′21″N 64°57′52″W | Caraquet municipality (8012) | Q2983641 | More images |
| Corner Store | 4261 Principale Street; Tracadie-Sheila NB | 47°28′48″N 64°55′12″W | Tracadie-Sheila municipality (7118) | | Upload Photo |
| Daly Point Nature Reserve | 2105 Carron Drive; Bathurst NB | 47°38′21″N 65°36′42″W | Bathurst municipality (5437) | | Upload Photo |
| DeGrâce Residence | 111 DeGrace Street; Shippagan NB | 47°44′48″N 64°42′44″W | Shippagan municipality (12186) | | Upload Photo |
| Flavien Doucet Residence | 548 King Avenue; Bathurst NB | 47°36′58″N 65°39′08″W | Bathurst municipality (6705) | | Upload Photo |
| Nazaire Dugas House | 690 St-Pierre-Ouest Boulevard; Caraquet NB | 47°46′13″N 65°01′46″W | Caraquet municipality (8025) | Q130340501 | More images |
| Duguay Residence | 205 J. D. Gauthier Boulevard; Shippagan NB | 47°44′41″N 64°42′48″W | Shippagan municipality (12188) | | Upload Photo |
| Église Saint-Pierre-aux-Liens | 213 St-Pierre Boulevard West; Caraquet NB | 47°47′24″N 64°57′51″W | New Brunswick (2147) | Q3583563 | More images |
| Elhatton's Funeral Home | 187 St. George Street; Bathurst NB | 47°37′09″N 65°39′15″W | Bathurst municipality (15121) | | Upload Photo |
| Entreprises Shippagan | 262 J. D. Gauthier Boulevard; Shippagan NB | 47°44′36″N 64°42′18″W | Shippagan municipality (12189) | | |
| Father Lafrance Monument | Principale Street; Tracadie-Sheila NB | 47°30′46″N 64°54′43″W | Tracadie-Sheila municipality (6030) | Q112348298 | More images |
| Alcide Ferguson House | 4246 Principal Street; Tracadie-Sheila NB | 47°28′52″N 64°55′10″W | Tracadie-Sheila municipality (8203) | | Upload Photo |
| Former Bank of Montreal Building | 200 Main Street; Shippagan NB | 47°37′15″N 65°39′13″W | Shippagan municipality (10408) | | Upload Photo |
| Former École des Mallet | 276 J. D. Gauthier Boulevard; Shippagan NB | 47°44′30″N 64°42′13″W | Shippagan municipality (12191) | | |
| Former Foster Mill Site | 994 des Chalets Street; Tracadie-Sheila NB | 47°28′22″N 64°55′33″W | Tracadie-Sheila municipality (6032) | | Upload Photo |
| Former Head Office of the Fédération des Caisses populaires acadiennes | 221 St-Pierre-Ouest Boulevard; Caraquet NB | 47°47′22″N 64°57′57″W | Caraquet municipality (8010) | Q130340332 | More images |
| Founders' Cemetery | Saulnier Est Street; Tracadie-Sheila NB | 47°30′30″N 64°54′15″W | Tracadie-Sheila municipality (7131) | | Upload Photo |
| Founding Families Monument | 3585 Principale Street; Tracadie-Sheila NB | 47°30′50″N 64°54′41″W | Tracadie-Sheila municipality (8172) | Q130341159 | More images |
| Fransblow Buildings | 3481 and 3485 Albert Street; Tracadie-Sheila NB | 47°31′02″N 64°54′47″W | Tracadie-Sheila municipality (7574) | | Upload Photo |
| Gabriel Giraud Site | Parc des Fondateurs on Saint-Paul Street; Bas-Caraquet NB | 47°47′57″N 64°52′38″W | New Brunswick (6641) | Q3364262 | More images |
| Gloucester Hotel | 100 Main Street; Bathurst NB | 47°37′12″N 65°39′23″W | Bathurst municipality (5233) | | Upload Photo |
| Herman J. Good V.C Branch No.18 Royal Canadian Legion War Museum | 575 St. Peter Ave; Bathurst NB | 47°37′47″N 65°40′02″W | Bathurst municipality (5457) | | Upload Photo |
| Greco Restaurant | 211 J.-D.-Gauthier Boulevard; Shippagan NB | 47°44′41″N 64°42′45″W | Shippagan municipality (12181) | | |
| J. Harper and Gwendolyn Kent Home | 695 Murray Avenue; Bathurst NB | 47°36′54″N 65°38′52″W | Bathurst municipality (9992) | | Upload Photo |
| Heritage Trail | Principale Street; Tracadie-Sheila NB | 47°30′40″N 64°54′24″W | Tracadie-Sheila municipality (9902) | | More images |
| Holy Family Cemetery | 430 St. Peter Avenue; Bathurst NB | 47°37′43″N 65°39′48″W | Bathurst municipality (9695) | | Upload Photo |
| Hotel Dieu Hospital | 645 Murray Ave; Bathurst NB | 47°36′55″N 65°38′49″W | Bathurst municipality (5236) | | Upload Photo |
| Hotel Paulin | 143 St-Pierre-Ouest Boulevard; Caraquet NB | 47°47′28″N 64°57′14″W | Caraquet municipality (7926) | Q130321698 | More images |
| Joseph Kent Farm | 1270 Riverside Dr; Bathurst NB | 47°36′33″N 65°40′16″W | Bathurst municipality (5234) | | Upload Photo |
| Loggie's Buildings | 3494 Dr Victor LeBlanc Blvd., 3497 and 3493 Albert Street; Tracadie-Sheila NB | 47°31′01″N 64°54′46″W | Tracadie-Sheila municipality (8163) | | Upload Photo |
| A & R Loggie's | 3490 Principale Street; Tracadie-Sheila NB | 47°31′03″N 64°54′41″W | Tracadie-Sheila municipality (7121) | | Upload Photo |
| W. A. Losier House | 3668 Principale Street; Tracadie-Sheila NB | 47°30′36″N 64°54′33″W | Tracadie-Sheila municipality (8211) | | Upload Photo |
| Louis Mailloux Monument | Des Patriotes Street; Caraquet NB | 47°47′30″N 64°56′41″W | Caraquet municipality (8011) | Q130339981 | More images |
| Maison de la fondue | 3613 Luce Street; Tracadie-Sheila NB | 47°30′44″N 64°54′39″W | Tracadie-Sheila municipality (7112) | | Upload Photo |
| John Meahan House | 666 King Avenue; Bathurst NB | 47°36′53″N 65°39′07″W | Bathurst municipality (6707) | | Upload Photo |
| Miscou Island Lighthouse National Historic Site of Canada | Miscou Island NB | 48°00′22″N 64°29′27″W | Federal (16125, (9728) | Q3378311 | More images |
| Nepisiguit Centennial Museum/Cultural Centre | 360 Douglas Ave; Bathurst NB | 47°37′04″N 65°39′22″W | Bathurst municipality (5480) | | Upload Photo |
| Northern Light | 355 King Avenue; Bathurst NB | 47°37′07″N 65°39′09″W | Bathurst municipality (5460) | | Upload Photo |
| O'Brien House | 324 St. Patrick Street; Bathurst NB | 47°37′03″N 65°38′52″W | Bathurst municipality (10421) | | Upload Photo |
| Officers' Mess | 555 Murray Avenue; Bathurst NB | 47°37′00″N 65°38′55″W | Bathurst municipality (10376) | | Upload Photo |
| Old Bathurst Post Office | 96 Main Street; Bathurst NB | 47°37′13″N 65°39′26″W | New Brunswick (2282) | Q102261042 | More images |
| Denis Ouellet House | 4239 Principale Street; Tracadie-Sheila NB | 47°28′53″N 64°55′12″W | Tracadie-Sheila municipality (8194) | | Upload Photo |
| Pallen House | 210-214 King Avenue; Bathurst NB | 47°37′14″N 65°39′14″W | Bathurst municipality (10604) | | Upload Photo |
| Simonne Paulin House | 1020 Ste-Marie Street; Sainte-Marie-Saint-Raphael NB | 47°46′32″N 64°34′43″W | Sainte-Marie-Saint-Raphael municipality (19987) | | Upload Photo |
| Pavillon Irène Léger | 218 J. D. Gauthier Boulevard; Shippagan NB | 47°44′46″N 64°42′30″W | Shippagan municipality (12183) | | |
| Petite école | 276 St-Pierre-Ouest Boulevard; Caraquet NB | 47°47′09″N 64°58′22″W | Caraquet municipality (7995) | | Upload Photo |
| Pointe-aux-Pères Site | 150-154 Youghall Drive; Bathurst NB | 47°38′51″N 65°39′41″W | New Brunswick (2668) | | Upload Photo |
| Protestant Cemetery | Principale Street; Tracadie-Sheila NB | 47°30′34″N 64°54′32″W | Tracadie-Sheila municipality (7114) | | Upload Photo |
| Religious Hospitallers of St. Joseph Cemetery | Couvent Street; Tracadie-Sheila NB | 47°30′45″N 64°54′30″W | Tracadie-Sheila municipality (5974) | Q112227709 | More images |
| Clovis T. Richard Home | 262 Main Street; Bathurst NB | 47°37′12″N 65°39′06″W | Bathurst municipality (10607) | | Upload Photo |
| Rioux Residence | 223 J. D. Gauthier Boulevard; Shippagan NB | 47°44′39″N 64°42′37″W | Shippagan municipality (12187) | | Upload Photo |
| Edmund Roussel House | 4251 Principale Street; Tracadie-Sheila NB | 47°28′51″N 64°55′12″W | Tracadie-Sheila municipality (8187) | | Upload Photo |
| Sacred Heart Cathedral | 123 St. Andrews Street; Bathurst NB | 47°37′04″N 65°39′19″W | Bathurst municipality (5225) | | |
| Sainte-Anne Chapel | 579 St-Pierre-Ouest Boulevard; Caraquet NB | 47°46′25″N 65°00′44″W | Caraquet municipality (8014) | | Upload Photo |
| Sainte-Famille Academy | 399 du Couvent Street; Tracadie-Sheila NB | 47°30′46″N 64°54′33″W | New Brunswick (6240), Tracadie-Sheila municipality (7113) | Q116996069 | More images |
| St. George's Anglican Cemetery | 255 Douglas Avenue; Bathurst NB | 47°37′10″N 65°39′21″W | Bathurst municipality (6450) | | Upload Photo |
| St. George's Anglican Church | 432 King Avenue; Bathurst NB | 47°37′02″N 65°39′10″W | Bathurst municipality (5969) | | Upload Photo |
| Saint-Isidore Church | 3915 Fondateurs Blvd. Hautes-Terres NB | 47°33′13″N 65°03′13″W | New Brunswick (2494) | | Upload Photo |
| Saint John's United Church | 260 J. D. Gauthier Boulevard; Shippagan NB | 47°44′35″N 64°42′21″W | Shippagan municipality (12185) | | |
| St-Joseph et St-Jean-Baptiste Church | 3475. Principale Street; Tracadie-Sheila NB | 47°30′48″N 64°54′44″W | Tracadie-Sheila municipality (7206) | | More images |
| St. Joseph Shrine | 3427 de la Chapelle Street; Tracadie-Sheila NB | 47°31′17″N 64°54′12″W | Tracadie-Sheila municipality (7132) | Q117508286 | More images |
| St. Luke's Cemetery | 390 St. Luke Court; Bathurst NB | 47°37′36″N 65°39′56″W | Bathurst municipality (10005) | | Upload Photo |
| Sainte-Rose-De-Lima Church | 1981, Route 355; Sainte-Rose NB | 47°37′27″N 64°59′05″W | New Brunswick (2322) | | Upload Photo |
| Salon de Couture Modifique | 3491 Albert Street; Tracadie-Sheila NB | 47°31′02″N 64°54′46″W | Tracadie-Sheila municipality (5972) | | Upload Photo |
| Schryer House | 615 Murray Avenue; Bathurst NB | 47°36′57″N 65°38′53″W | Bathurst municipality (10377) | | Upload Photo |
| Dr. Smith House | 3708 Principale Street; Tracadie-Sheila NB | 47°30′30″N 64°54′33″W | Tracadie-Sheila municipality (8216) | | Upload Photo |
| Tabagie Centre-ville | 219 J. D. Gauthier Boulevard; Shippagan NB | 47°44′40″N 64°42′40″W | Shippagan municipality (12182) | | Upload Photo |
| Tower | Entrance to Shippagan Gulley; Shippagan NB | 47°43′16″N 64°40′02″W | Federal (4741) | | |
| Village Historique Acadien | Route 11, 14311-2; New Bandon-Salmon Beach NB | 47°47′49″N 65°06′05″W | New Brunswick (6222) | | |
| Wade Surplus d'Armée | 4254 Principale Street; Tracadie-Sheila NB | 47°28′50″N 64°55′10″W | Tracadie-Sheila municipality (6686) | | Upload Photo |
| Walker Trading Establishment | 1500 Queen Elizabeth Drive; Bathurst NB | 47°39′25″N 65°37′22″W | New Brunswick (2544) | | Upload Photo |
| Willis Farmhouse | 635 Youghall Drive; Bathurst NB | 47°39′13″N 65°39′18″W | Bathurst municipality (10449) | | Upload Photo |

== See also ==
- List of historic places in New Brunswick
- List of National Historic Sites of Canada in New Brunswick
