= Saumarez Parish, New Brunswick =

Saumarez
- Parish
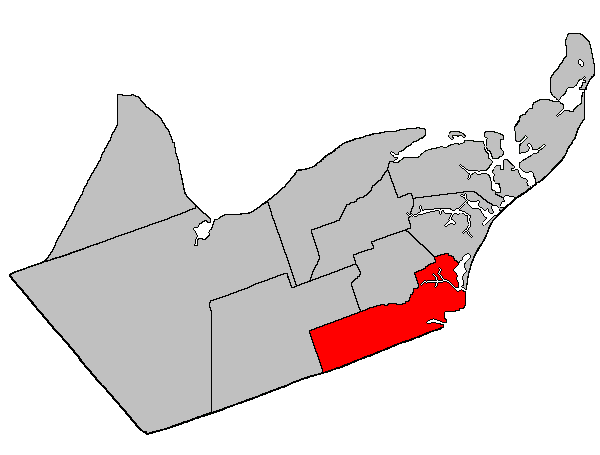
- Location within Gloucester County, New Brunswick map erroneously shows pre-1896 boundaries
- Coordinates: 47.5°N 64.94°W
- Country: Canada
- Province: New Brunswick
- County: Gloucester
- Erected: 1814

Area
  - Land: 326.78 km^{2} (126.17 sq mi)

Population (2016)
  - Total: 6,818
  - Density: 20.9/km^{2} (54/sq mi)
  - Change 2011-2016: ▼1.5%
  - Dwellings: 3,111
- Time zone: UTC-4 (AST)
  - Summer (DST): UTC-3 (ADT)
- Figures do not include portion within regional municipality of Tracadie; No census data available after 2016

Saumarez is a geographic parish in Gloucester County, New Brunswick, Canada. (Note: The Territorial Division Act divides the province into 152 parishes, the cities of Saint John and Fredericton, and one town of Grand Falls. The Interpretation Act clarifies that parishes include any local government within their borders.)

For governance purposes, the entire parish is within the regional municipality of Tracadie. Before the formation of the regional municipality in 2014, Saumarez Parish included one town and twelve local service districts, with an additional special service area within the parish LSD.

Tracadie is a member of the Acadian Peninsula Regional Service Commission (APRSC).

== Origin of name ==
The parish was named in honour of Sir Thomas Saumarez, acting Governor of New Brunswick when it was erected. Six of the parishes erected simultaneously in Northumberland County in 1814 were named for prominent British military figures.

== History ==
Saumarez was erected in 1814 as part of Northumberland County from unassigned territory. It included all modern Gloucester County except Beresford Parish.

In 1827, all of the parish west of Teague's Brook was erected as Bathurst Parish.

In 1831, Caraquet and New Bandon were erected as their own parishes.

In 1855, Inkerman was erected from the northern part of Saumarez. The barrier islands east of Tracadie Bay were included in Inkerman.

In 1870, the barrier islands south of the Old Tracadie Gully were returned to Saumarez.

In 1881, a large area along the northwestern boundary was included in the newly erected Saint-Isidore Parish.

In 1947, the western end of Saumarez was included in the newly erected Allardville.

== Boundaries ==
Saumarez Parish is bounded:

- on the east by LeBouthillier Brook, the Old Tracadie Gully, and the Gulf of Saint Lawrence;
- on the south by the Northumberland County line;
- on the west by the western line of timber block 4 in Ranges 8, 9, 10, the southernmost corner of Range 10 being downstream of the mouth of Bear Brook and upstream of the mouth of Big Hole Brook;
- on the north by the prolongation of the southern line of Range 9 in the Saint Isidore Settlement, which runs along the south side of Rang 9 Road, northeasterly to the Little Tracadie River, then downstream until it strikes Range 9 again, then northeasterly along Range 9 to its easternmost corner, then northwesterly along the eastern line of Ranges 9, 8 (partly along Alderwood Road), and 7 to the rear line of Range 6 of Saint Isidore, which runs along the south side of Route 160, then northeasterly along Range 6 to its easternmost corner, then northwesterly to the sharp bend of Boishébert Road, then northeasterly along grant lines to Gaspereau Creek, then upstream two grants to the southern line of Route 160 and the W. Gautreau Road, then northeasterly to the Saint-Raymond Road, then northwesterly across two grants to the northern line of the second grant, then northeasterly along the grant line and its prolongation to where Route 11 crosses LeBouthillier Brook.

== Communities ==
Communities at least partly within the parish. italics indicate a name no longer in official use

- Alderwood
- Benoit
- Gauvreau
- Leech
- Little Gaspereau
- Little Tracadie
- Losier Settlement
- Pointe-à-Bouleau
- Pont-Lafrance
- Pont-Landry
- Rivière-à-la-Truite (Trout Stream)
- Saint-Irénée
- Saint-Pons
- Saumarez
- Tracadie Beach
- Tracadie-Sheila
- Upper Sheila
- Val-Comeau

== Bodies of water ==
Bodies of water (Note: Not including brooks, ponds or coves.) at least partly within the parish.

- Rivière à Comeau
- Big Tracadie River
- Leech River
- Little Tracadie River
- Tabusintac River
- Odilon Stream
- Trout Stream
- Gulf of St. Lawrence
- Tracadie Bay
- Big Tracadie River Gully
- Old Tracadie Gully
- Tracadie Gully
- The Lake

== Conservation areas ==
Parks, historic sites, and related entities at least partly within the parish.

- Val-Comeau Provincial Park

== Demographics ==
=== Population ===
Canada census – Saumarez Parish, New Brunswick community profile

	2016	2011
Population	6,818 (-1.5% from 2011)	6,920 (+1.3% from 2006)
Land area	326.78 km^{2} (126.17 sq mi)	326.78 km^{2} (126.17 sq mi)
Population density	20.9/km^{2} (54/sq mi)	21.2/km^{2} (55/sq mi)
Median age	49.2 (M: 48.5, F: 49.8)	45.9 (M: 45.5, F: 46.3)
Private dwellings	3,111 (total)	3,016 (total)
Median household income	$56,029	$47,379

References: 2016 2011

Historical Census Data - Saumarez Parish, New Brunswick

Year	Pop.	±%
1991	7,466	—
1996	7,405	−0.8%
2001	6,963	−6.0%

Year	Pop.	±%
2006	6,837	−1.8%
2006A	6,832	−0.1%
2011	6,920	+1.3%

Year	Pop.	±%
2016	6,818	−1.5%

(A) adjustment due to boundary change

=== Language ===
Canada Census Mother Tongue - Saumarez Parish, New Brunswick
Census	Total	French			English			French & English			Other		
Year	Responses	Count	Trend	Pop %	Count	Trend	Pop %	Count	Trend	Pop %	Count	Trend	Pop %
2011	6,870	6,695	▲1.3%	97.45%	125	▼10.7%	1.82%	45	▲80.0%	0.65%	5	▼83.3%	0.08%
2006	6,805	6,610	▼3.2%	97.13%	140	▲86.7%	2.06%	25	▼16.7%	0.37%	30	▲ n/a%	0.44%
2001	6,935	6,830	▼4.5%	98.49%	75	▼58.3%	1.08%	30	▼25.0%	0.43%	0	0.0%	0.00%
1996	7,370	7,150	n/a	97.02%	180	n/a	2.44%	40	n/a	0.54%	0	n/a	0.00%

== See also ==
- List of parishes in New Brunswick
