= Marc Guylaine =

1969 Canadian fishing vessel

History

Canada
- Name: Marc Guylaine II (1969-1972); Jean Marc IV (1972-1974); Freeport (1974-present)
- Port of registry: Vancouver (from 1977)
- Builder: Saint John Shipbuilding, Saint John, New Brunswick
- Yard number: 1095
- Launched: 1969
- Identification: IMO number: 6924296; Official number: 330514
- Status: in active service, as of 2012

General characteristics
- Type: Fishing boat
- Tonnage: 126.16 GT; 63.13 NT
- Length: 22.13 m (72 ft 7 in)
- Beam: 6.77 m (22 ft 3 in)
- Depth: 3.05 m (10 ft 0 in)
- Propulsion: 1 × 798 bhp (595 kW) diesel engine
- Speed: 10 knots (19 km/h; 12 mph)

Marc Guylaine was a Canadian herring seiner built in 1969, along with its two sister ships, the Lady Dorianne and Lady Audette. After its two sister ships both mysteriously sank in the Acadian peninsula, drowning nine men, and the only two other ships built to the same specifications met identical fates, the Marc Guylaine became the subject of great fear that it would meet a similar end.

The government eventually agreed to purchase the "cursed" ship from its captain, and subsequently renamed it and moved it out of Atlantic Canada, selling it to a fishing corporation on the Pacific Coast where it remains in service today as the Freeport.

== Construction ==
In 1969, Saint John Shipbuilding built three identical 126-tonne fishing trawlers named the Lady Audette II, the Marc Guylaine II, and the Lady Dorianne II. The original engineering records for the Dorianne and Audette were obtained by the Marine Museum of the Great Lakes at Kingston for their records-collection.

The Marc Guylaine was sold to Gélas Haché, and the Lady Audette was sold to A. Chaisson.

== Sinkings ==
On November 23, 1970, Lady Dorianne departed from Havre-Aubert en route to Shippagan following a storm. It was alternatively reported as having five or six men aboard, including captain Sylvio Noël, when it disappeared off the coast of Miscou Island. Everybody aboard was presumed killed, although the ship and bodies were never found. In December, the Ministry of Transportation was urged to not give up its search for the ship, since the previous sinkings of two identical ships were still unexplained and it was hoped that the wreckage might provide a clue to its fate. It was never found, although searches turned up an uninflated life raft from the ship.

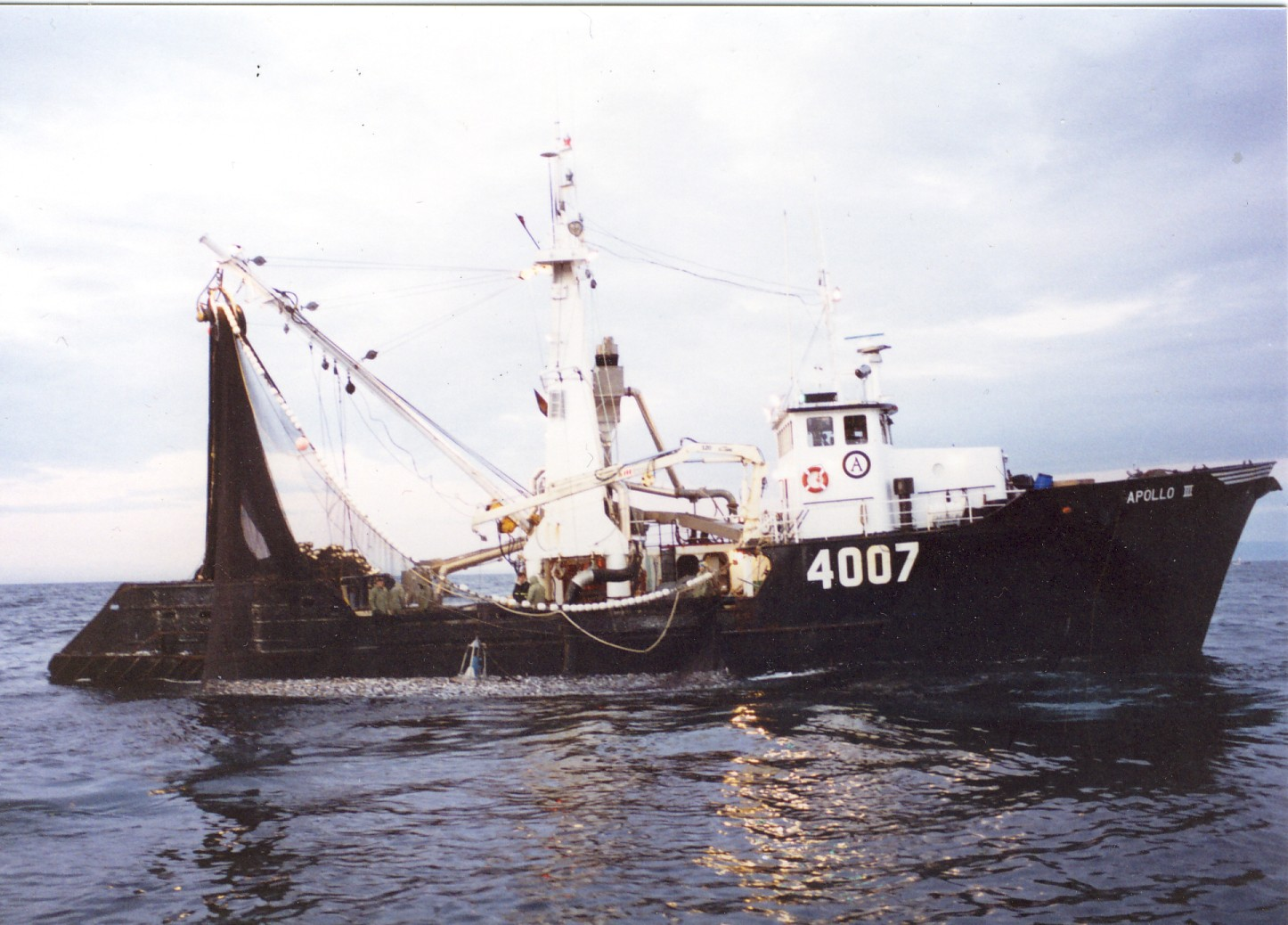
Apollo III, the trawler that received the cry for help.

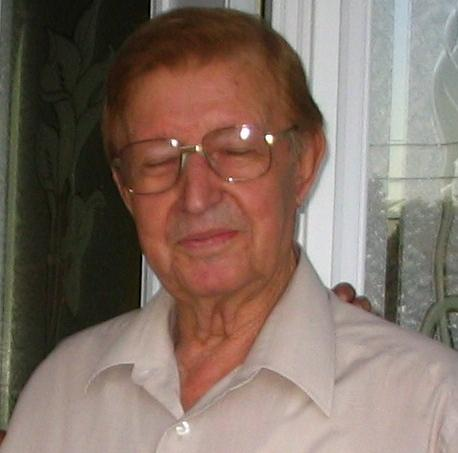
Captain Roméo Michon

On April 23, 1971, the Lady Audette radioed the trawler Apollo III, addressing its captain Roméo Michon: "Roméo, come quickly to us, we are sinking." The Lady Audette is believed to have inexplicably sunk near the Rochers aux Oiseaux off Magdalen Islands, and could not be found. Three men drowned but, unlike the sinking of her sister ship, there were also four or five survivors. Two years later, the wreckage was discovered.

== Aftermath ==
In May 1971, an anxious Acadian fishing population demanded a public hearing into the safety of the Marc Guylaine, and 400 people met at the Ste-Marie-St-Raphaël community centre where an "action group" was commissioned to study the issue. Ultimately the last of the sister ships was found to be unseaworthy.

Federal official Bernard M. Deschênes was appointed as Commission Counsel to study both the Audette and Dorianne sinkings. In 1973, the Canadian Coast Guard released its report entitled In the Matter of a Formal Investigation Into the Circumstances Attending the Loss of the M.F.V. "Lady Dorianne II" and the M.F.V. "Lady Audette II" in the Gulf of St. Lawrence on Nov. 23, 1970, and Apr. 22, 1971, Resp.

Haché, the captain of the Marc Guylaine, subsequently found he could not hire any local fishermen to man his ship, and petitioned the provincial Ministry of Fisheries to offset his financial losses incurred. The resulting battle took a year to wind its way through bureaucracy, as civil servants ruled that Marc Guylaine was perfectly seaworthy. In May 1972, at the urging of the local population to consider Haché an "innocent victim", the Ministry agreed to purchase the boat from him.

Rather than scrap the ship, the ministry simply renamed the vessel to Jean Marc IV and re-sold it within the year. It was renamed the F/V Freeport in 1974, and registered in Vancouver on the Pacific coast three years later.

In 1992, it was one of two Pacific vessels to cooperate with the Simon Fraser University research study "Decision Dynamics at Sea: An Application of Foraging Theory to the Study of Fishing Effort".

In 2005, it was cited by Sitka, Alaska authorities for failing to have an Automatic Identification System aboard.

It remains in use today, registered through 2009, by the Kanata Fishing Company in Prince Rupert, British Columbia.

== In media ==
Écoutez mes amis / Entendez-vous le vent
Qui hurle dans la nuit / Que c'en est énervant
Écoutez mes amis / Ce chalutier qui crie
Et la mer qui ricane / C'est le Lady Dorianne

— Calixte Duguay

For several years, the legend of the "cursed" ships became a regular report in the media. In 1973, Stompin' Tom Connors wrote The Curse of the Marc Guylain, referring to the three sister ships as "three floating coffins on the sea". Calixte Duguay, a French Acadian songwriter, and performer also wrote the song "La Complainte du Lady Dorianne" on the same subject.

The Lady Dorianne was also the subject of a song entitled The Tempest in 2005.

In 2008, Lighthouse Productions contracted filmmaker Paul-Émile d'Entremont to film a documentary seeking the wreckage of the Lady Dorianne, which was theorised to be sitting 240 feet beneath sea level, as the only known shipwreck in the area. The film is scheduled for completion in late 2009.
