= Tracadie-Sheila =

Tracadie
- Former town
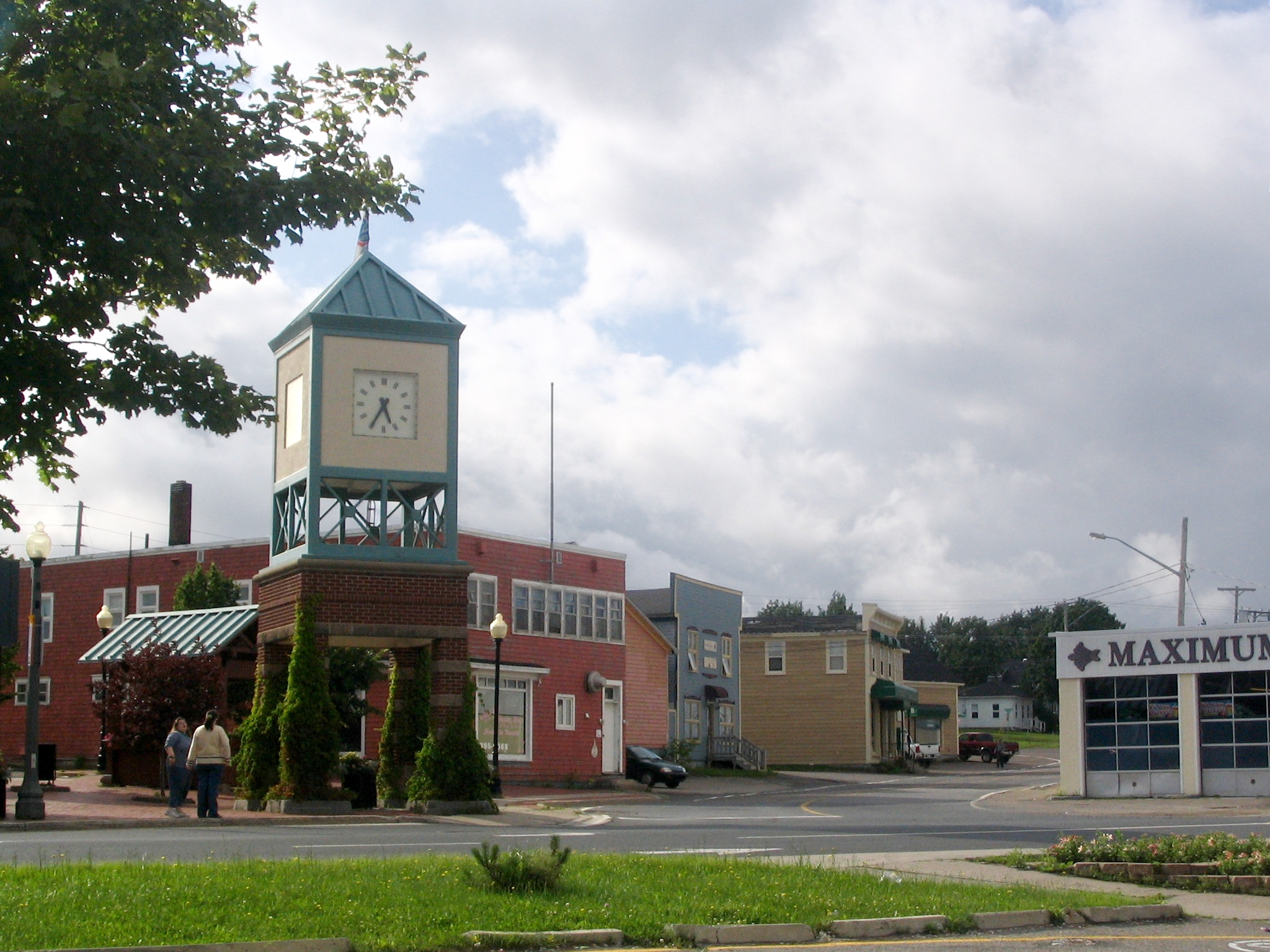
- Downtown Tracadie

- Seal

- Location within New Brunswick.
- Coordinates: 47.51239°N 64.91010°W
- Country: Canada
- Province: New Brunswick
- County: Gloucester
- Parish: Saumarez
- Town of Tracadie: 1966
- Village of Sheila: October 1, 1978
- Town of Tracadie-Sheila: January 1, 1992
- RM of Tracadie: July 1, 2014

Government
  - Type: Town Council
  - Mayor: Aldéoda Losier
  - Deputy Mayor: Bobby Ferguson
  - Councillors: List of Members: Rose-Marie Doiron; Marc Jean; Jean-Yves McGraw; Denis McLaughlin; Fernand Paulin; Vera Paulin
  - Executive Director: Denis Poirier

Area
  - Total: 24.65 km^{2} (9.52 sq mi)
- Elevation: 0–22 m (0–72 ft)

Population (2011)
  - Total: 16,000
  - Density: 200.1/km^{2} (518/sq mi)
  - Pop 2006-2011: ▲10.1%
  - Dwellings: 2,255
- Time zone: UTC-4 (AST)
  - Summer (DST): UTC-3 (ADT)
- Postal code(s): E1X
- Area code: 506: Area exchanges: 394
- NTS Map: 21P10 Tracadie
- GNBC Code: DATGK
- Website: www.tracadie-sheila.ca

Tracadie-Sheila (/ˌtrækədi ˈʃaɪlə/ TRAK-ə-dee SHY-lə) is a former town in Gloucester County, New Brunswick, Canada. It is now part of the Regional Municipality of Tracadie.

== Demographics ==
=== Population ===
Canada census – Tracadie-Sheila community profile

	2011
Population	16,000 (+10.1% from 2006)
Land area	24.65 km^{2} (9.52 sq mi)
Population density	200.1/km^{2} (518/sq mi)
Median age	45.4 (M: 45.1, F: 45.7)
Private dwellings	2,255 (total)
Median household income	$47,661

References: 2011

Historical Census Data - Tracadie–Sheila, New Brunswick

Year	Pop.	±%
1991	4,383	—
1996	4,773	+8.9%

Year	Pop.	±%
2001	4,724	−1.0%
2006	4,474	−5.3%

Year	Pop.	±%
2011	4,933	+10.3%

=== Language ===
Canada Census Mother Tongue - Tracadie–Sheila, New Brunswick
Census	Total	French			English			French & English			Other		
Year	Responses	Count	Trend	Pop %	Count	Trend	Pop %	Count	Trend	Pop %	Count	Trend	Pop %
2011	4,880	4,670	▲13.6%	95.70%	155	▲34.8%	3.18%	25	▲ n/a%	0.51%	30	▼57.1%	0.61%
2006	4,295	4,110	▼6.2%	95.69%	115	▼20.7%	2.68%	0	▼100.0%	0.00%	70	▲ n/a%	1.63%
2001	4,575	4,380	▲1.0%	95.74%	145	▼45.3%	3.17%	50	▲400.0%	1.09%	0	▼100.0%	0.00%
1996	4,625	4,335	n/a	93.73%	265	n/a	5.73%	10	n/a	0.22%	15	n/a	0.32%

== Tourism and culture ==
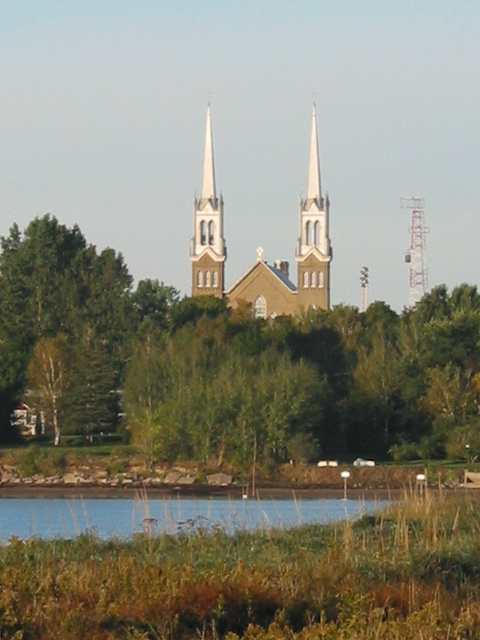
Church of Saint-Jean-Baptiste and Saint-Joseph in Tracadie-Sheila

Located on the Acadian Peninsula, the area has a number of sandy beaches. Val-Comeau, the most popular, is protected as a Provincial Park. The beaches can usually be enjoyed from June until September, when the water is a moderate temperature.

Signage is in French, as most inhabitants of the Acadian Peninsula are predominantly French speaking. The community became known as the hometown of Wilfred Le Bouthillier, winner of the 2003 Quebec reality show Star Académie. The success of the young singer, known simply as Wilfred, resulted in a significant rise in tourism to the region.

The town is also home to pop singer Jean-François Breau. Well-known AIDS activist Dr. Réjean Thomas and opera singer Michèle Losier, (both now residing in Montreal), are from the neighbouring village of St-Isidore, part of the greater Tracadie area.

== Economy ==
The region suffers from high unemployment because of its relative isolation from centres of greater population. It depends on federal government assistance to compensate for the weak economic performance of the last decades. Most well-paid jobs tend to be government-related, including teachers, nurses and doctors. Other employers are in the "Parc Industriel".

Tourism is an important seasonal employer, particularly in the summer months of June, July and August. Thousands of vacationers, mostly from neighbouring Québec, come for the beaches, ocean, and hospitality.

== Transportation ==
The closest public airport is Bathurst Airport (IATA code: ZBF), 75 kilometres west of the town. It is served by Air Canada Jazz with twice daily flights to Montreal.

The community was once served by CN Rail for freight rail transport, but the rail line was abandoned in the 1980s. Today the nearest rail service is at Miramichi or Bathurst with the New Brunswick East Coast Railway; Via Rail Canada provides 6-day/week passenger rail service at Bathurst and Miramichi using its train the Ocean, running to Montreal and Halifax.

The town is located on Highway 11 which links the town to Caraquet and Shippagan to the northeast and Miramichi to the southwest. The town is connected to Highway 8 to Bathurst via Highway 365 and Highway 160 through Saint-Isidore and Allardville.
