= New Brunswick Route 363 =

Highway in New Brunswick, Canada

Route 363

Route information
- Maintained by New Brunswick Department of Transportation

Major junctions
- East end: Route 160 east of Saint-Sauveur
- West end: Route 135 in Hacheyville

Location
- Country: Canada
- Province: New Brunswick
- Major cities: Butte-D'Or, Spruce Brook

Highway system
- Provincial highways in New Brunswick; Former routes
| ← Route 360 | → Route 365 |

Route 363 is a 3-kilometre (1.9 mi) long east–west secondary highway in the northeast portion of New Brunswick, Canada.

The route's eastern terminus is east of the community of Saint-Sauveur. The road travels east to through the communities of Butte-D'Or and Spruce Brook before ending in Hacheyville.

== Intersecting routes ==
- None
