= List of islands of New Brunswick =

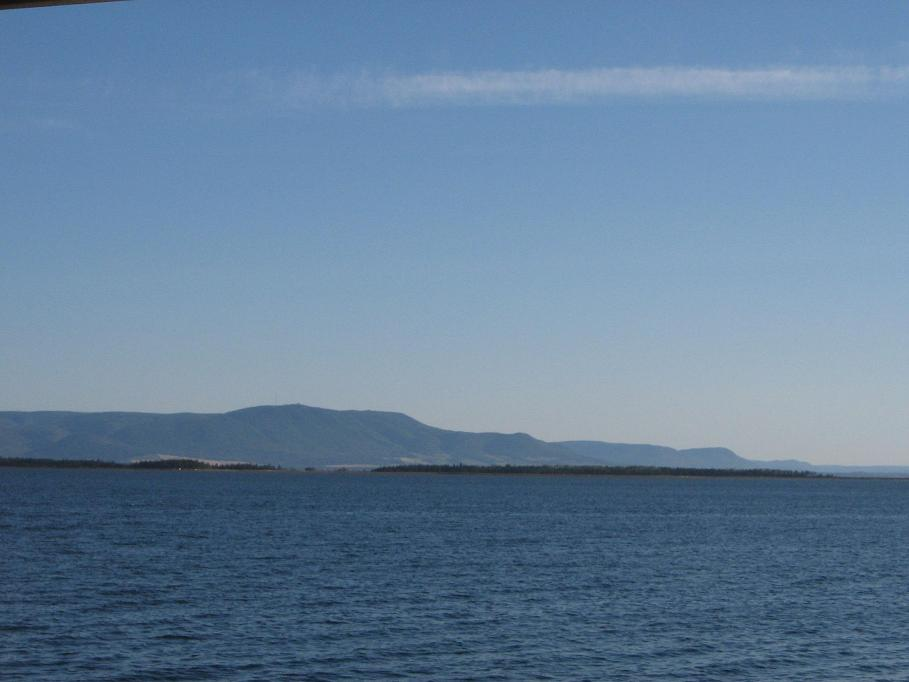
Heron Island as seen from New Brunswick with Quebec's Mont-Saint-Joseph in background.

This is a list of islands of New Brunswick. The province of New Brunswick is composed of mainland New Brunswick and is lined with islands of various magnitudes.

== List of islands ==
Name	Located In	Area km^{2}	Parish	County	2012 Pop	Remarks
Bear Island	Saint John River		Queensbury	York		
Beaubears Island	Southwest Miramichi River		Newcastle	Northumberland		
Campobello Island	Passamaquoddy Bay	39.6 km^{2}	Campobello	Charlotte		
Coles Island	Canaan River		Johnston	Queens		
Deer Island	Passamaquoddy Bay	45 km^{2}	West Isles	Charlotte		
Grand Manan Island	Bay of Fundy	137 km^{2}	Grand Manan	Charlotte		
Heron Island	Chaleur Bay		Bathurst Parish	Restigouche		Uninhabited by humans
Kennebecasis Island	Kennebecasis River			Kings		
Kent Island	Bay of Fundy	0.8 km^{2}	Grand Manan	Charlotte		
Lamèque Island	Gulf of Saint Lawrence	150 km^{2}	Shippagan	Gloucester		
Machias Seal Island	Gulf of Maine	8 hectares	Grand Manan	Charlotte		
Miscou Island	Miscou Harbour	100 km^{2}	Shippagan	Gloucester		
Ministers Island	Passamaquoddy Bay		Saint Andrews	Charlotte		
Navy Island	Saint John Harbour		Simonds	Saint John		Destroyed to create footings for the Harbour Bridge
North Rock	Bay of Fundy		Grand Manan	Charlotte		
Oromocto Island	Saint John River		Maugerville	Sunbury		
Partridge Island	Bay of Fundy		Simonds	Saint John		
Sheldrake Island	Miramichi River	13 hectares	Alnwick	Northumberland		
White Head Island	Bay of Fundy		Grand Manan	Charlotte		
Darlings Island	Kennebecasis River	121.39 km^{2}	Hampton	Kings		Located 4.53 km SW of Hampton: Hampton Parish, Kings County: Benjamin Darling was an early settler here. Latitude : 45° 30' Longitude : 65° 53' https://archives.gnb.ca/Exhibits/Communities/Details.aspx?culture=en-CA&community=4534

== See also ==
- List of islands of Canada
- Geography of New Brunswick
