= Pokesudie, New Brunswick =

Community in New Brunswick, Canada

Coordinates: 47.8056°N 64.7775°W

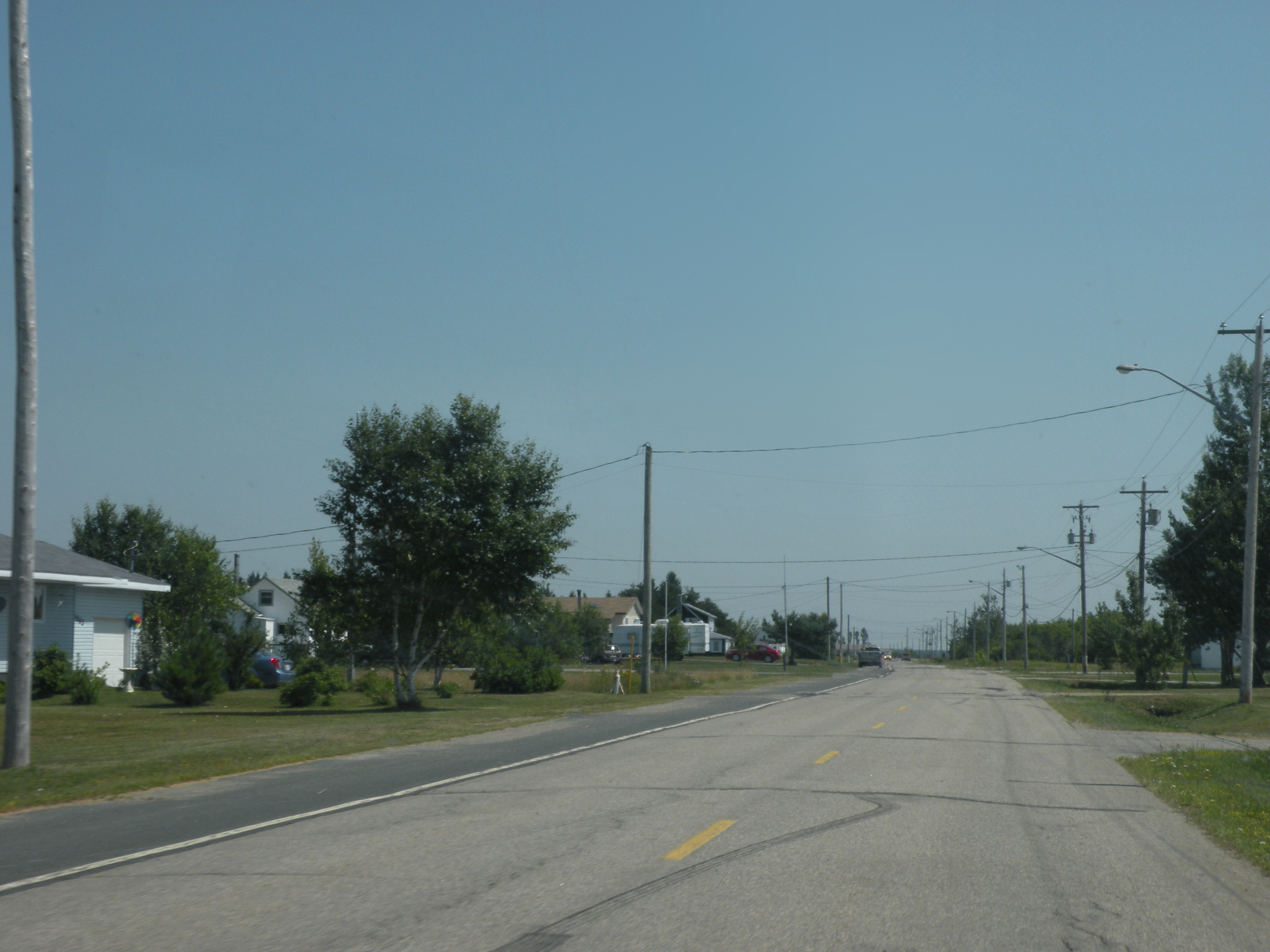
Street of Pokesudie, New Brunswick, Canada

Pokesudie is a community in the Gloucester County, New Brunswick, Canada.

The former local service district of Pokesudie took its name from the community.

== Demographics ==
In the 2021 Census of Population conducted by Statistics Canada, Pokesudie had a population of 202 living in 103 of its 118 total private dwellings, a change of −11.4% from its 2016 population of 228. With a land area of 13.37 km^{2} (5.16 sq mi), it had a population density of 15.1/km^{2} (39.1/sq mi) in 2021.

== See also ==
- List of communities in New Brunswick
