= Haut-Shippagan, New Brunswick =

Coordinates: 47.747610°N 64.758196°W

Haut-Shippagan is an unincorporated place in New Brunswick, Canada. It is recognized as a designated place by Statistics Canada.

== Demographics ==
In the 2021 Census of Population conducted by Statistics Canada, Haut-Shippagan had a population of 265 living in 127 of its 149 total private dwellings, a change of -5.4% from its 2016 population of 280. With a land area of 6.49 km^{2} (2.51 sq mi), it had a population density of 40.8/km^{2} (105.8/sq mi) in 2021.

== See also ==
- List of communities in New Brunswick
