= Saint-Isidore, New Brunswick =

Saint-Isidore
- Location within New Brunswick
- Coordinates: 47°33′N 65°03′W
- Country: Canada
- Province: New Brunswick
- County: Gloucester
- Parish: Saint-Isidore
- Town: Hautes-Terres
- Founded: 1876
- Incorporated: 1991

Area
  - Total: 22.94 km^{2} (8.86 sq mi)

Population (2021)
  - Total: 810
  - Density: 35.3/km^{2} (91/sq mi)
  - Change (2016–21): ▲6.0%
  - Dwellings: 387
- Time zone: UTC-4 (AST)
  - Summer (DST): UTC-3 (ADT)
- Postal code(s): E8M
- Area code: 506
- Highways Route 135 Route 160: Route 365

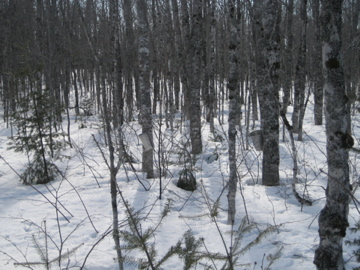
Maple Trees in St-Isidore during the Maple harvesting season

Saint-Isidore (French pronunciation: [sɛ̃t‿izidɔʁ]) is a former village in Gloucester County, New Brunswick, Canada. It held village status prior to 2023 and is now part of the town of Hautes-Terres. It is adjacent to the communities of Pont-Landry, Hacheyville, Bois-Gagnon and Tilley Road. The community is situated on the Acadian Peninsula.

Saint-Isidore is in the town of Tracadie-Sheila's sphere of influence. With the population being Acadian, almost all of its inhabitants speak French as a mother tongue and are of the Catholic religion. The local school name is École la Relève and offers kindergarten through seventh grade classes.

The main industries are agriculture, asphalt and services. The village maintains a local museum, a public pool and a few parks around the municipality. It is crossed by provincial Route 160 and Route 135.

== History ==
The settlement was founded by Rev. Gagnon in 1876 and merged with the community of Bois-Hébert which was incorporated in 1991 as the current Village de Saint-Isidore. The first mayor ever elected was Norbert J. Sivret. The Acadian influence is represented through the majestic local church, which was built in 1904.

On 1 January 2023, Saint-Isidore amalgamated with the village of Paquetville and all or part of six local service districts to form the new town of Hautes-Terres. The community's name remains in official use.

== Demographics ==
In the 2021 Census of Population conducted by Statistics Canada, Saint-Isidore had a population of 810 living in 364 of its 387 total private dwellings, a change of 6% from its 2016 population of 764. With a land area of 22.94 km^{2} (8.86 sq mi), it had a population density of 35.3/km^{2} (91.5/sq mi) in 2021.

== Notable people ==
- include AIDS activist Dr. Réjean Thomas and opera singer Michèle Losier, both now living in Montreal, Quebec.

== See also ==
- List of communities in New Brunswick
