= Shippegan Parish =

Shippegan Shippagan
- Parish
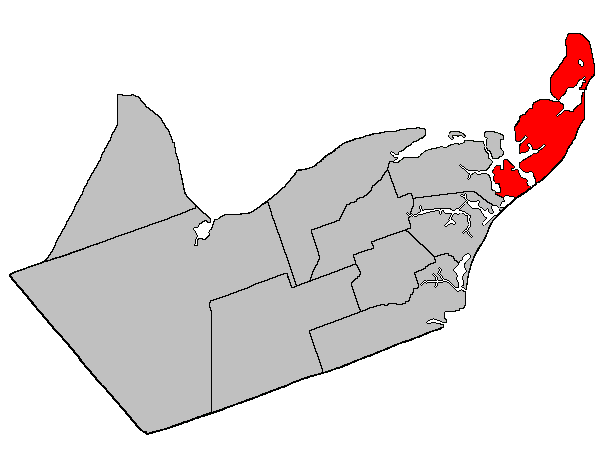
- Location within Gloucester County, New Brunswick
- Coordinates: 47.855°N 64.62°W
- Country: Canada
- Province: New Brunswick
- County: Gloucester
- Erected: 1851

Area
  - Land: 204.52 km^{2} (78.97 sq mi)

Population (2021)
  - Total: 4,781
  - Density: 23.4/km^{2} (61/sq mi)
  - Change 2016-2021: ▼0.4%
  - Dwellings: 2,663
- Time zone: UTC-4 (AST)
  - Summer (DST): UTC-3 (ADT)
- Figures do not include portions within the towns of Lamèque and Shippagan and the villages of Le Goulet and Sainte-Marie-Saint-Raphaël

Shippegan (incorrectly Shippagan from the French colloquial spelling) is a geographic parish in Gloucester County, New Brunswick, Canada. (Note: The Territorial Division Act divides the province into 152 parishes, the cities of Saint John and Fredericton, and one town of Grand Falls. The Interpretation Act clarifies that parishes include any local government within their borders.) Located in the northeastern corner of the province at the end of the Acadian Peninsula, the parish consists of the three main islands of Taylor, Lamèque, and Miscou, along with several smaller islands and tidal wetlands; Taylor Island is now joined to the mainland by an isthmus, which is crossed by a causeway.

Extensive wetlands lead to a peat moss industry; more recently Spanish multinational Acciona has built a wind farm operation on Lamèque Island. Kiteboarding has been a successful tourist attraction.

For governance purposes, the parish is divided between the towns of Île-de-Lamèque and Shippagan and the Acadian Peninsula rural district, corresponding to the three main islands and the small islands near them; all three are members of the Acadian Peninsula Regional Service Commission.

Prior to the 2023 governance reform, Shippegan had more governance divisions than any other parish in the province, with two towns, two villages, and fourteen local service districts (LSDs), one of which had a named area with enhanced services.

== Origin of name ==
The parish takes its name from Shippegan Island, a name formerly used for Lamèque Island. The island's name comes from the Mi'kmaq name Sepaguncheech, translated by Silas Tertius Rand as a passage used by ducks, a name which originally applied only to Shippegan Harbour.

== History ==
Shippegan was erected in 1851 from Caraquet Parish.

== Boundaries ==
Shippegan Parish is bounded:

- on the north by Chaleur Bay;
- on the east and southeast by the Gulf of Saint Lawrence;
- on the south and southwest by a line beginning at the mouth of Baie de Petit-Pokemouche, then running north 52º west (Note: By the magnet of 1851, when declination in the area was between 22º and 23º west of north. The Territorial Division Act clause referring to magnetic direction bearings was omitted in the 1952 and 1973 Revised Statutes.) through the bay and across the isthmus joining Taylor Island to the mainland, then running generally northward through Baie Saint-Simon-Sud, Baie Saint-Simon-Nord, and Baie de Shippagan to the starting point
- including Miscou Island, Lamèque Island, (Note: Formerly known as Shippegan Island or Shippigan Island.) Taylor Island, (Note: Joined to the mainland by a wetlands isthmus.) and Île à William (Note: In Baie Saint-Simon-Sud, formerly known as Sandy Island and Bandy Island.) in Baie Saint-Simon-Sud.

== Former governance ==
The four municipalities and fourteen LSDs gave Shippegan more governance units than any other parish in the province; only two of the LSDs contained more than one community. The former towns and villages of Shippagan, Lamèque, Le Goulet, and Sainte-Marie-Saint-Raphaël each have their own articles; only the former LSDs are detailed here. All LSDs assessed for the additional services of Community & Recreation Services, while only the parish of Shippegan did not have street lighting. Italics indicate local service districts that were dissolved or incorporated before 2023.

LSDs are grouped geographically for convenience; street number boundaries and taxation information are taken from Service New Brunswick.

The parish of Shippegan (French la paroisse de Shippegan) contained all the leftovers of the parish, the areas not part of a municipality or another LSD. Established in 1968, most of the LSD's population lives in the Pointe Brûlée (Pointe-Brûlée) service area, containing the community of Pointe-Brûlé, (Note: This isn't the only case of the LSD Regulation misspelling a community's name.) is in the northwestern corner of Taylor Island, west of Shippagan and north of Haut-Shippagan; the taxing authorities are Pointe-Brûlé and Par. de Shippegan. The remainder of the LSD is mostly wetlands on Taylor and Lamèque Islands, along with Île à William in Saint-Simon-Sud Bay. The various portions of the parish LSD were divided between the two towns and the rural district by geographical location, with Île à William becoming part of Shippagan.

Miscou Island (île de Miscou) comprised the entire island; the nearby Île au Trésor and Grass Island were taxed as part of this LSD. The LSD was established in 1980 to provide garbage collection. Most communities are along Route 113 on the western side of the island: (from south to north) Miscou Harbour, Miscou Centre, Grande-Plaine, and Miscou Lighthouse; Wilson Point is in the southeastern corner of the island at the end of Wilson Point Road. The island and barrier islands between it and Lamèque now form the Acadian Peninsula rural district.

On Taylor Island:

Pointe-Sauvage (Indian Island) (Note: The official name in both English and French; the community is Pointe-Sauvage in both.) comprised the land grants along Pointe-Sauvage Road between Shippagan and Le Goulet. It was established in 1974 to provide street lighting.

Baie du Petit Pokemouche ran along the Petit-Pokemouche Road between Le Goulet and Shippagan and also included Marcel Road and Élie Lane along the shore. Established in 1980 to provide street lighting; the taxing authority was Baie du Petit-Pokemouche. The Lanteigne seafood factory here was destroyed by fire in 2013.

Haut-Shippagan contained the wetlands along the former western border of Shippagan and developed areas along the Haut-Shippagan and des Huîtres Roads. Established in 1988. The former Shippagan Provincial Park in the northwestern corner of the LSD.

On Lamèque Island, going clockwise from Lamèque:

Pointe-Alexandre contained the peninsula between Petite-Lamèque Bay and the mouth of Jean-Marie Brook, along with grants along the northern side of the brook; the northern border on Route 313 was south of Rue du Pont. Established in 1987 as service area of the parish LSD to add street lighting to the area, it became an LSD in its own right in 1989 when garbage collection was added.

Petite-Lamèque along the coast ran from Petite-Lamèque Bay to the Pointe-Canot Barachois, with the southern side of Allée de la Pré and Allée des Vacanciers forming parts of its northern border; inland it ran from Rue du Pont and up along Chemin du Portage to numbers 581 and 584, as well as fields east of Portage. Established in 1970 to provide street lighting. Originally extending only as far north as Rue Guignard, it was enlarged in 1987 to include the strip north along Portage.

Pointe-Canot running north along Route 313 from Allée de la Pré to nos. 7206 and 7211, it contained small developments and beach lots stretching from Allée des Vacanciers in the south to Allée de la Grande Bature in the north. Established in 1987 from the southern part of Ste. Cecile along Route 313, to provide for recreational facilities.

Ste. Cecile (Ste-Cécile) contained the northwestern part of Lamèque Island, running along Route 313 from north of Grande Bature to the western bank of Campbells River, extending inland to include several land grants that now host wind turbines. The communities of Sainte-Cécile, Petite-Rivière-de-l'Île, and Petit-Shippagan run clockwise from the southern border along Route 313. Established in 1972 to provide street lighting, it originally included Pointe-Canot and the northern part of Petite-Lamèque, which were removed in 1987; the taxing authority is Saint-Cécile. The Lamèque International Baroque Music Festival has most of its concerts at Sainte-Cécile Church in Petite-Rivière-de-l'Île.

Coteau Road (Chemin Coteau) contained grants along Coteau Road, Route 310 from Lamèque to its end at Route 305, a short stretch of Route 305 south of its junction with Route 310, inland grants south of Grand-Ruisseau Road, along the eastern bank of Campbells River, surrounding Peat Moss Lease 13, and south of Route 310 between Lamèque and Sainte-Marie-Saint-Raphaël. Established in 1987 to provide garbage collection. It was originally part of Pigeon Hill-Coteau Road.

Pigeon Hill included the northeastern corner of the island, from the grants along the beach on the southern shore of Miscou Harbour, around Pointe à Baleine and south along Route 305 nearly to Grand Étang, also included some interior grants along or near Grand Ruisseau Road. Established in 1987 to provide garbage collection. Originally part of Pigeon Hill-Coteau Road.

Cap-Bateau (Cap-Bâteau) comprised coastal land grants south from Grand Étang to the edge of Sainte-Marie-Saint-Raphaël, as well as a second tier of grants north of SMSR. It was established in 1987. Originally most of Cap-Bateau was part of St. Raphael sur-Mer until most of that was incorporated as a village in 1986, when the remainder was returned to the parish LSD.

Haut-Lamèque was between the boundaries of Lamèque and SMSR for most of its length, with grants along Route 305 on the southwestern corner of SMSR and along Route 113 as far south as no. 5096. Established in 1977 to provide street lighting, it included four grants at the western end of Rue Saint-Raphaël Ouest until 1986.

Chiasson-Savoy was in the southeastern corner of the island, separated from SMSR and Haut-Lamèque by a large wetland area and a sparsely populated stretch of Route 113. Comprising mainly grants between Shippegan Harbour and the interior wetlands, the LSD included the communities of Savoy Landing in the west and Chiasson (the 911 system uses Chiasson Office) in the east. Established in 1970 to provide street lighting. Several small grants at the eastern end of Chiasson Road were of uncertain status - they were taxed as part of Chiasson-Savoy but were outside the legal boundaries; and were shown as part of the parish LSD in official maps for two governance reform projects in the parish.

LeGoulet (Note: The LSD's name did not have a space.) was the first LSD in the parish, containing modern Le Goulet and a small part of Baie-du-Petit-Pokemouche. It was established in 1967 and became a village in 1986.

Portage-de-Shippegan (Portage de Shippagan) was along Route 113 on the southern edge of Shippigan. It was established in 1979 to provide street lighting and annexed by Shippagan in 2001 to expand its industrial park.

Pigeon Hill-Coteau Road contained much of the two modern LSDs but did not contain the areas along Miscou Harbour, grants west of Coteau Road and Route 310, or several grants south of Route 310 in modern Coteau Road. It was established in 1971 and split into two new LSDs in 1987, both with new areas added.

St. Raphael sur-Mer contained most of Sainte-Marie-Saint-Raphaël and Cap-Bateau, with small interior areas of the modern village and LSD not included. It was established in 1970 and most became a village as SMSR in 1986.

== Bodies of water ==
Bodies of water (Note: Not including brooks, ponds or coves.) at least partly within the parish.

- Campbells River
- Herring Creek
- Landrys River
- Chaleur Bay
- Gulf of St. Lawrence
- Miscou Harbour
- MacGregors Mal Bay
- Queue of Mal Bay
- Windsors Mal Bay
- Barachois de Pointe-Canot
- Miscou Gully
- Shippegan Gully
- more than 20 officially named lakes
- Baie de Shippegan
  - Baie Brûlé
  - Baie aux Caribous
  - Baie de Lamèque
  - Baie de Petite-Lamèque
  - Baie Saint-Simon-Nord
  - Baie Saint-Simon-Sud

== Islands ==
Islands at least partly within the parish.

- Île au Trésor
- Île à William
- Grass Island
- Lamèque Island
- Miscou Island

== Conservation areas ==
Parks, historic sites, and related entities at least partly within the parish.

- Miscou Provincial Park surrounds Miscou Island Lighthouse at the end of Route 113 in the northeastern corner of the island.
- Miscou Grande Plaine Protected Natural Area is near the northwestern corner of the island; the southeastern corner of the PNA runs along Vibert Road.

== Demographics ==
Parish population total does not include incorporated municipalities

=== Population ===
Population trend

Census	Population	Change (%)
2016	4,800	▼4.1%
2011	5,004	▼6.8%
2006	5,370	▼3.3%
2001-Adj	5,552	0.0%
2001	5,600	▼5.3%
1996	5,913	▼2.0%
1991	6,031	N/A

=== Language ===
Mother tongue (2016)

Language	Population	Pct (%)
French only	4610	96.0%
English only	165	3.4%
Other languages	5	0.1%
Both English and French	20	0.4%
