= Le Goulet, New Brunswick =

Le Goulet
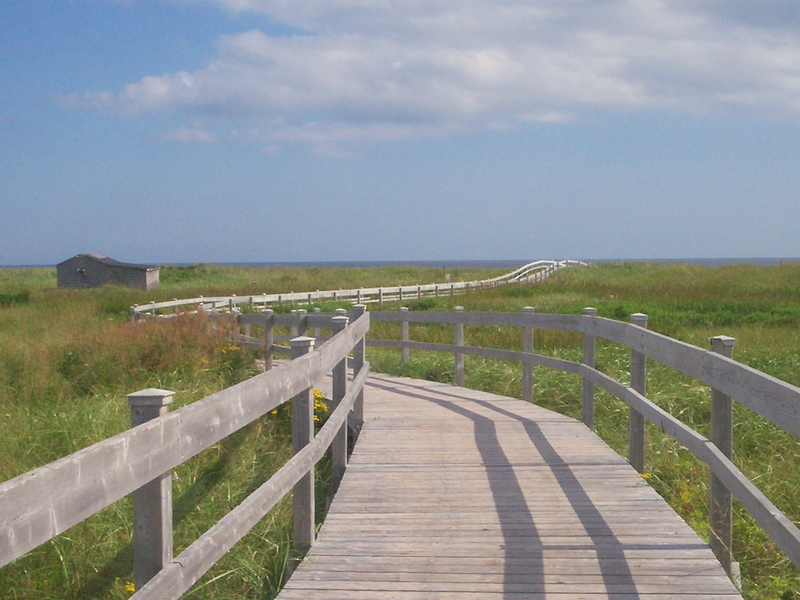

- Location within New Brunswick
- Coordinates: 47°42′N 64°43′W
- Country: Canada
- Province: New Brunswick
- County: Gloucester
- Parish: Shippagan
- Town: Shippagan
- Incorporated: 1986

Area
  - Land: 5.40 km^{2} (2.08 sq mi)

Population (2021)
  - Total: 749
  - Density: 138.6/km^{2} (359/sq mi)
  - Change (2016–21): ▼5.5%
  - Dwellings: 339
- Time zone: UTC-4 (AST)
  - Summer (DST): UTC-3 (ADT)
- Postal code(s): E8S
- Area code: 506
- Highways: None
- Website: www.legoulet.ca

Le Goulet is a former village in Gloucester County, New Brunswick, Canada. Located several kilometres east-southeast of downtown Shippagan, it sits on the Gulf of St. Lawrence. Formerly an incorporated village, it is now part of the town of Shippagan.

== History ==
The village was originally called New Jerusalem Settlement when it was initially settled in 1879. Le Goulet was incorporated in 1986.

On 1 January 2023, Le Goulet amalgamated with the town of Shippagan and all or part of seven local service districts to form the new town of Shippagan. The community's name remains in official use.

== Demographics ==
Historical Census Data - Le Goulet, New Brunswick
Year	Pop.	±%
1991	1,087	—
1996	1,029	−5.3%
2001	969	−5.8%
2006	908	−6.3%
2011	817	−10.0%
2016	793	−2.9%
2021	749	−5.5%

In the 2021 Census of Population conducted by Statistics Canada, Le Goulet had a population of 749 living in 321 of its 339 total private dwellings, a change of −5.5% from its 2016 population of 793. With a land area of 5.4 km^{2} (2.1 sq mi), it had a population density of 138.7/km^{2} (359.2/sq mi) in 2021.

Canada census – Le Goulet community profile

	2021	2011
Population	749 (-5.5% from 2016)	817 (-10.0% from 2006)
Land area	5.40 km^{2} (2.08 sq mi)	5.46 km^{2} (2.11 sq mi)
Population density	138.6/km^{2} (359/sq mi)	149.6/km^{2} (387/sq mi)
Median age	55.6 (M: 54.8, F: 56.8)	49.5 (M: 48.4, F: 50.6)
Private dwellings	339 (total) 321 (occupied)	334 (total)
Median household income	$72,000	$.N/A

Notes: 2011 income data for this area has been suppressed for data quality or confidentiality reasons.
References: 2021 2011

=== Language ===
Canada Census Mother Tongue - Le Goulet, New Brunswick
Census	Total	French			English			French & English			Other		
Year	Responses	Count	Trend	Pop %	Count	Trend	Pop %	Count	Trend	Pop %	Count	Trend	Pop %
2011	815	805	▼9.5%	98.77%	5	▼66.7%	0.61%	5	▲ n/a%	0.61%	0	0.0%	0.00%
2006	905	890	▼6.8%	98.34%	15	▼25.0%	1.66%	0	0.0%	0.00%	0	0.0%	0.00%
2001	975	955	▼5.9%	97.95%	20	▲100.0%	2.05%	0	0.0%	0.00%	0	0.0%	0.00%
1996	1,025	1,015	n/a	99.02%	10	n/a	0.98%	0	n/a	0.00%	0	n/a	0.00%

== See also ==
- List of communities in New Brunswick
