= Daulnay, New Brunswick =

Coordinates: 47.416556°N 65.4595°W

Location of Daunlay in New Brunswick

Daulnay is a Canadian community in Gloucester County, New Brunswick. It is part of the local service district of Allardville, which includes several other communities.

== History ==
The settlement was named after the 17th century Charles de Menou d'Aulnay, a leader of the French colonization of Canada.

== See also ==
- List of communities in New Brunswick
