= Lamèque Island =

Island in New Brunswick, Canada

Big Shippagan Lighthouse
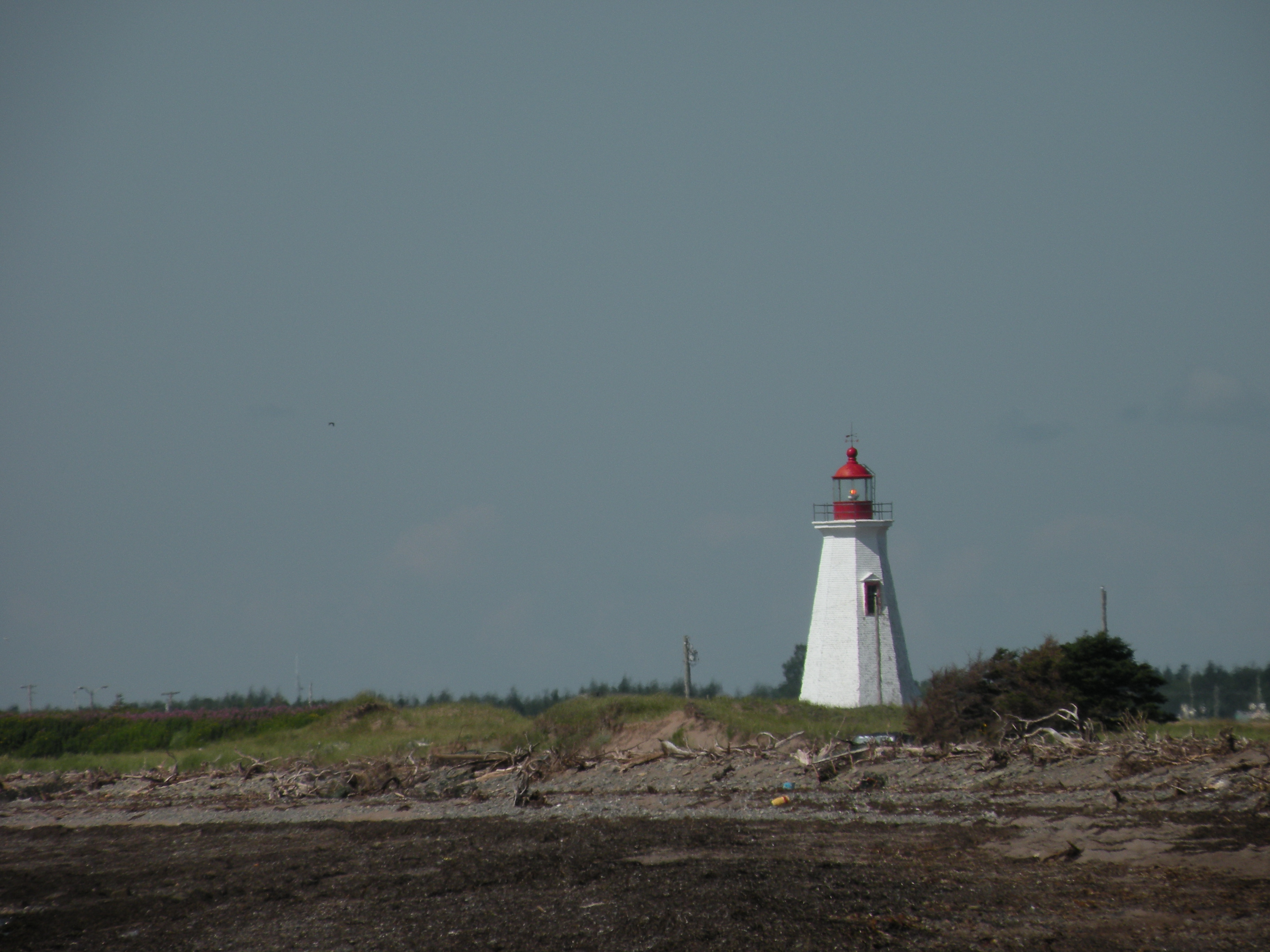
- Location: lamèque Island, Shippegan Parish, Canada
- Coordinates: 47°43′19.82″N 64°39′38.18″W

Tower
- Constructed: 1872
- Construction: wooden tower
- Height: 16.5 metres (54 ft)
- Shape: octagonal frustun tower with balcony and lantern
- Markings: white tower, red lantern
- Power source: mains electricity
- Operator: Canadian Coast Guard
- Heritage: recognized federal heritage building of Canada

Light
- Focal height: 16.5 metres (54 ft)
- Lens: fourth-order Fresnel lens (original), Barbier, Bernard et Turenne lantern (current)
- Range: 15 nautical miles (28 km; 17 mi)
- Characteristic: Fl Y 5s.

Lamèque Island (French: Île Lamèque), (formerly Shippegan Island or Shippigan Island), is a Canadian island in the Gulf of St. Lawrence at the northeastern tip of Gloucester County, New Brunswick.

The island has an area of 150 square kilometres (58 sq mi). It is separated from mainland North America on the south by the Shippagan Gut with the island forming Lameque Bay, Shippagan Harbour and Shippagan Bay west of this channel. The island is separated from Miscou Island on the north by the Miscou Channel, with both islands forming Miscou Harbour.

The Shippagan Gut is bridged between the town of Shippagan on the mainland to the community of Savoy Landing on Lamèque Island by a 1,000-metre (3,300-foot) combination causeway-bridge with a lift bridge over a navigation channel for small craft.

The Miscou Channel is bridged between the community of Little Shippagan on Lamèque Island to the community of Miscou Harbour on Miscou Island by the 2,000-metre (6,600-foot) Miscou Island Bridge.

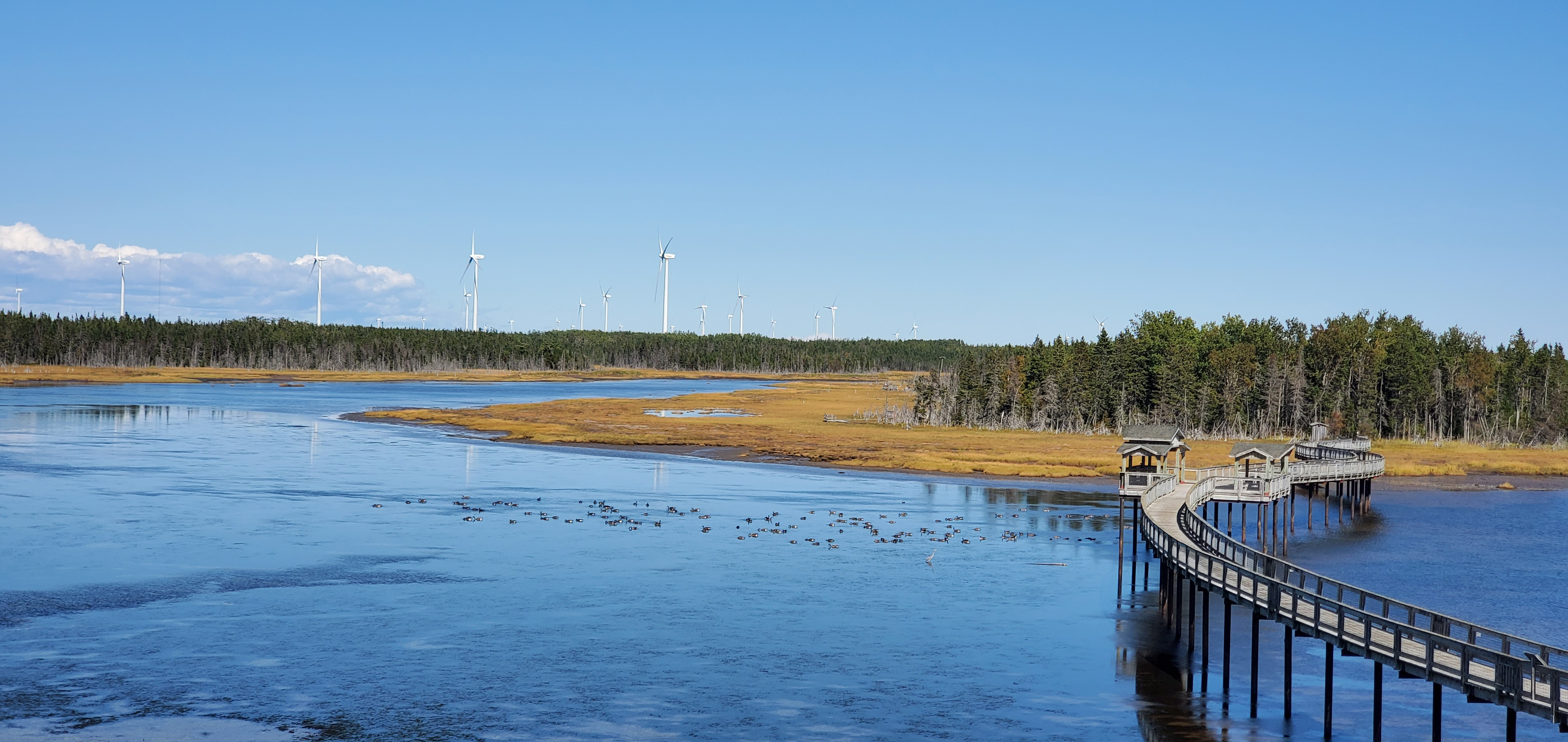
Ecological Park of the Acadian Peninsula in Lamèque

Lamèque Island and Miscou Island separate Chaleur Bay from the Gulf of Saint Lawrence.

== See also ==
- List of lighthouses in New Brunswick
- Acadian Peninsula
- Lamèque, New Brunswick
- Shippagan, New Brunswick
- List of communities in New Brunswick
- List of islands of New Brunswick
