= Miscou Island, New Brunswick =

Coordinates: 47.960439°N 64.519517°W

Miscou Island is an unincorporated area in New Brunswick, Canada. It is recognized as a designated place by Statistics Canada under the name of Miscou Island / Île de Miscou.

== Geography ==
The unincorporated area is on the eponymously named Miscou Island. It is bound by Chaleur Bay to the west, the Gulf of St. Lawrence to the east, and Miscou Harbour to the south.

== Demographics ==
In the 2021 Census of Population conducted by Statistics Canada, Miscou Island / Île de Miscou had a population of 551 living in 269 of its 337 total private dwellings, a change of 4% from its 2016 population of 530. With a land area of 62.08 km^{2} (23.97 sq mi), it had a population density of 8.9/km^{2} (23.0/sq mi) in 2021.

== Transportation ==
Miscou Island is accessed by Route 113.

== See also ==
- List of communities in New Brunswick
