= Michèle Losier =

Canadian opera singer (born 1978)

- Born: March 27, 1978 (age 48); Montreal, Quebec, Canada
- Genres: Opera, art song
- Occupations: Mezzo-soprano, vocal teacher
- Years active: 2005–present
- Website: michelelosier.com

Michèle Losier (born March 27, 1978) is a Canadian mezzo-soprano. A laureate of the Queen Elisabeth Competition (2008), she has appeared at major opera houses including the Metropolitan Opera, the Paris Opera, La Scala, the Royal Opera House, the Vienna State Opera, and La Monnaie. She teaches voice at the Royal Conservatoire Antwerp and the Royal Conservatory of Brussels.

== Career ==
Losier grew up in Saint-Isidore, New Brunswick, before returning to Montreal to pursue her studies. She earned a bachelor's degree in voice at McGill University under Winston Purdy, then attended the Juilliard Opera Center, where she studied with Marlena Malas. She also participated in the Merola Program of the San Francisco Opera and the Atelier lyrique of the Opéra de Montréal.

She won first prize at the Canadian Music Competition in 2001 and was a finalist in the Metropolitan Opera National Council Auditions in 2005. She made her Metropolitan Opera debut in 2007 in Gluck's Iphigénie en Tauride, singing the role of Diana alongside Susan Graham and Plácido Domingo, conducted by Louis Langrée. Following her participation in the Queen Elisabeth Competition in 2008, she recorded a disc of Henri Duparc songs with pianist Daniel Blumenthal, released on the Fuga Libera label.

Her international career has encompassed a wide range of roles: Charlotte in Werther at the Sydney Opera House (2009); Siébel in Faust at the Royal Opera House and the Metropolitan Opera; Prince Charming in Cendrillon at the Opéra-Comique and the Gran Teatre del Liceu; Dorabella in Così fan tutte at the Paris Opera, the Théâtre des Champs-Élysées, and the Salzburg Festival; and Sesto in La clemenza di Tito at the Vienna State Opera and La Monnaie. In 2012, she sang the title role in Charpentier's Médée at the Théâtre des Champs-Élysées. In 2015, she sang Carmen before an audience of approximately 45,000 at the Olympic Stadium in Montreal as part of the Orchestre symphonique de Montréal's Virée classique festival.

Later engagements include Ascanio in Berlioz's Benvenuto Cellini at the Opéra Bastille (2018) in a production by Terry Gilliam conducted by Philippe Jordan, praised by Gramophone as a performance in which she "stole the show"; Idamante in Idomeneo at La Scala (2019); and Octavian in Der Rosenkavalier at the Staatsoper Unter den Linden (2022), La Monnaie, and the Grand Théâtre de Genève (2023), in a production staged by Christoph Waltz. In 2026, she made her role debut as Kundry in Wagner's Parsifal at the Semperoper in Dresden, conducted by Daniele Gatti.

Her concert engagements have included Das Lied von der Erde with Yannick Nézet-Séguin and the Orchestre Métropolitain (2020), Mahler's Symphonies Nos. 2 and 3 with Zubin Mehta and Daniele Gatti, and Mendelssohn's Elijah with Gatti at the Accademia Nazionale di Santa Cecilia and the Staatskapelle Dresden.

Losier teaches voice at the Royal Conservatoire Antwerp and, since September 2024, at the Royal Conservatory of Brussels.

== Awards and distinctions ==
- Laureate of the Queen Elisabeth Competition (2008)
- Grant recipient, Canada Council for the Arts
- Grant recipient, Conseil des arts et des lettres du Québec
- Grant recipient, Fondation Jacqueline Desmarais and Fondation Sylva-Gelber
- Prix Opus, Concert of the Year in Montreal (Orchestre Métropolitain, Bluebeard's Castle, cond. Yannick Nézet-Séguin, 2020)

== Discography ==
=== Studio recordings ===
- Complete Mélodies, Henri Duparc (with Daniel Blumenthal, piano), Fuga Libera, 2008
- La colombe, Gounod (Hallé Orchestra, cond. Mark Elder), Opera Rara, 2015
- Roméo et Juliette, Berlioz (BBC Symphony Orchestra, cond. Sir Andrew Davis), Chandos Records, 2016
- Chants d'amour (Brahms, Liebeslieder-Walzer), with Kimmy MacLaren, Pascal Charbonneau, Alexandre Sylvestre; Piano: Myriam Farid and Olivier Godin, ATMA Classique, 2016
- Temps nouveau (Gounod, Massenet, Franck, Bizet, Saint-Saëns; piano: Olivier Godin), ATMA Classique, 2017
- Jules Massenet — Complete Songs for Voice and Piano (13 CDs, with Karina Gauvin, Marie-Nicole Lemieux et al.; piano: Olivier Godin), ATMA Classique, 2022

=== Video releases ===
- Faust, Gounod (Siébel; Metropolitan Opera, cond. Yannick Nézet-Séguin), Decca, 2011
- Les Contes d'Hoffmann, Offenbach (La Muse/Nicklausse; Gran Teatre del Liceu, cond. Stéphane Denève), Gran Teatre del Liceu, 2013
- Così fan tutte, Mozart (Dorabella; Paris Opera, cond. Philippe Jordan, dir. Anne Teresa De Keersmaeker), Arthaus Musik, 2017
- La clemenza di Tito, Mozart (Sesto; Orchestra of the Age of Enlightenment, cond. Robin Ticciati, dir. Claus Guth, Glyndebourne Festival), Opus Arte, 2018
- Benvenuto Cellini, Berlioz (Ascanio; Rotterdam Philharmonic Orchestra, cond. Mark Elder, dir. Terry Gilliam), Naxos, 2018
- Der Rosenkavalier, R. Strauss (Octavian; Staatskapelle Berlin, cond. Zubin Mehta), Arthaus Musik, 2021
