= Tracadie Beach =

Human settlement in New Brunswick, Canada

Coordinates: 47.452°N 64.913°W

Location of Tracadie Beach in New Brunswick

Tracadie Beach was a settlement in Gloucester County, New Brunswick. It is now a part of the Regional Municipality of Grand Tracadie–Sheila.

According to the 2021 census, the CDP Portage River-Tracadie Beach had a population of 440.

== See also ==
- List of communities in New Brunswick
