= Allardville, New Brunswick =

Allardville
- Location within New Brunswick.
- Coordinates: 47°28′24.93″N 65°29′25.91″W
- Country: Canada
- Province: New Brunswick
- County: Gloucester County, New Brunswick
- Founded: 12 september 1932
- Founder: Jean-Joseph-Auguste Allard
- Time zone: UTC-4

Allardville is a Canadian rural community in Gloucester County, New Brunswick. The community is centred on the intersection of Route 134, Route 160 and Route 360 and is part of the local service district of Allardville, which includes several other communities.

== History ==
Located south of Bathurst, the community is named for Monsignor Jean Joseph August Allard (1884-1971), founder of the local mission in the 1930s. Previously, Allard served as the priest of Ste-Marie-du-Mont-Carmel Roman Catholic Church in East Bathurst. The community was founded on 12 september, 1932 during the Great Depression as part of the back-to-the-land movement.

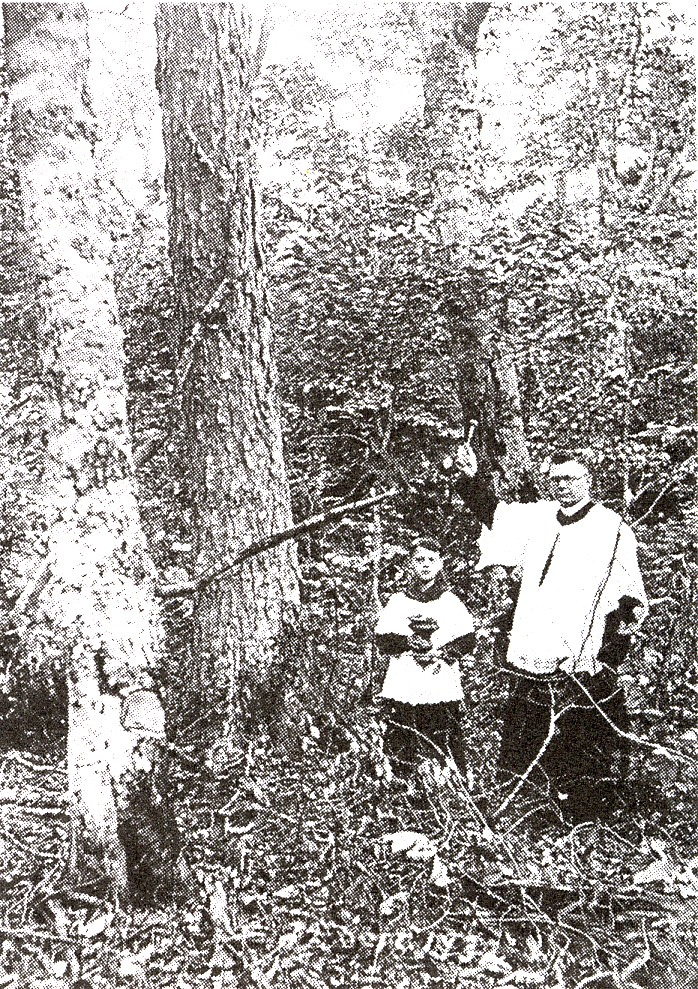
The foundation of Allardville on 12 September 1932 with Allard

== Education ==
=== Provincial public school systems ===
- École François-Xavier-Daigle

== Notable people ==
- Achille Michaud, journalist born in Allardville
- Réjean Roy, novelist, children's author & poet born in Allardville
