= Pont-Lafrance, New Brunswick =

Coordinates: 47.450°N 64.979°W

Location of Pont-Lafrance in New Brunswick

Pont-Lafrance was a settlement in New Brunswick. It is now part of the Regional Municipality of Grand Tracadie–Sheila.

Pont-Lafrance After the Rev. Francois Xavier Lafrance (1814-67), one of the founders of Collège Saint-Joseph, who served as parish priest at Tracadie.

== See also ==
- List of communities in New Brunswick
