= Saint-Isidore Parish =

Saint-Isidore St. Isidore
- Parish
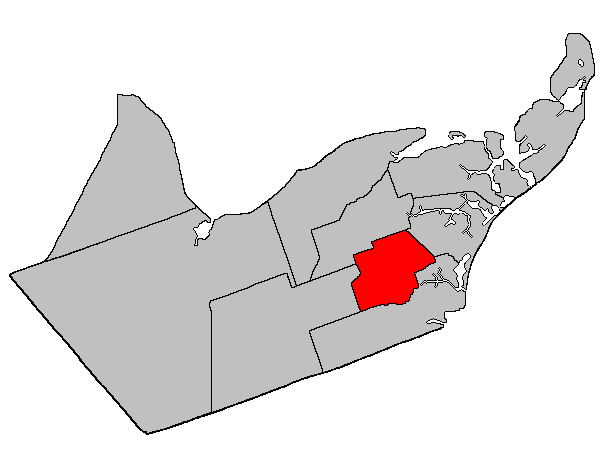
- Location within Gloucester County, New Brunswick
- Coordinates: 47.57°N 65.14°W
- Country: Canada
- Province: New Brunswick
- County: Gloucester
- Erected: 1881

Area
  - Land: 173.14 km^{2} (66.85 sq mi)

Population (2021)
  - Total: 1,312
  - Density: 7.6/km^{2} (20/sq mi)
  - Change 2016-2021: ▼3.6%
  - Dwellings: 643
- Time zone: UTC-4 (AST)
  - Summer (DST): UTC-3 (ADT)
- Figures do not include portions within the village of Saint-Isidore and the regional municipality of Tracadie

Saint-Isidore (French pronunciation: [sɛ̃t‿izidɔʁ]) is a geographic parish in Gloucester County, New Brunswick, Canada.

For governance purposes it is divided between the town of Hautes-Terres and the regional municipality of Tracadie, both of which are members of the Acadian Peninsula Regional Service Commission.

Prior to the 2023 governance reform, the Hautes-Terres portion was divided between the village of Saint-Isidore and the local service district of the parish of Saint-Isidore (Note: The LSD of the parish of Saint-Isidore extends into Paquetville Parish, Saint-Isidore Parish does not.), which further included the special service area of Bois-Blanc - Hacheyville - Duguayville.

== Origin of name ==
The parish's name may have come from Saint Isidore, Patron Saint of farmers.

== History ==
Saint-Isidore was erected in 1881 from Inkerman and Saumarez Parishes.

In 1947, the western end of Saint-Isidore was included in the newly erected Allardville Parish.

== Boundaries ==
Saint-Isidore Parish is bounded:

- on the north by the southern line of Range 6 of Paquetville South Settlement, which is on the south side of the Val-Doucet Road, from just west of the Pokemouche River northeast of Spruce Brook Road, to a point between Route 355 and Sugary Brook;
- on the east by a line starting at the point between Route 355 and Sugary Brook, then running southeasterly to strike the southern side of the Saint-Raymond Road on the southeastern corner of a grant that crosses both the W. Gautreau Road and Gaspereau Creek, then westerly along the southern line of the grant to Gaspereau Creek, then downstream to the southern line of a tier of grants along the W. Gautreau Road;
- on the south by a line running the southern line of a tier of grants along W. Gautreau Road and its prolongation to the sharp bend of Boishébert Road on the eastern edge of Saint-Isidore, then southeasterly to the rear line of Range 6 of the Saint Isidore Settlement, which is on the south side of Route 160, then southwesterly to the eastern line of Range 7, then southeasterly along the eastern line of Ranges 7, 8 (along part of Alderwood Road), and 9 to the Little Tracadie River, then up the Little Tracadie until it strikes the southern line of Range 9 again, then southwesterly along Range 9 and its prolongation to the southwestern corner of timber block 7, east of the Big Tracadie River;
- on the west by the western line of timber block 7 and the western line of Ranges 5 and 6 of the Saint Isidore Settlement, which are on either side of Route 160, to the northwestern corner of Range 5, then northeasterly to the prolongation of the north line of Range 1 in the Saint Isidore Settlement, which runs along the north side of Mallais Road, then northwesterly along the western line of Range 1 to its northwestern corner, then northeasterly along the northern line of Range 1 to just east of the Pokemouche River northeast of Spruce Brook Road, then northwesterly along grant lines to the southern line of Range 6 of Paquetville South.

== Communities ==
Communities at least partly within the parish. bold indicates an incorporated municipality

- Bois-Blanc
- Bois-Gagnon
- Duguayville
- Hacheyville
- Haut-Saint-Isidore
- **Saint-Isidore**
  - Boishébert
- Spruce Brook
- Tilley Road
- **Tracadie**
  - Pont-Landry
- Upper Tilley Road

== Bodies of water ==
Bodies of water (Note: Not including brooks, ponds or coves.) at least partly within the parish.

- Little Tracadie River
- Pokemouche River
- Lac Saint-Coeur

== Demographics ==
Parish population total does not include village of Saint-Isidore and portion within Regional Municipality of Tracadie

=== Population ===
**Population trend**

Census	Population	Change (%)
2016	1,361	▼0.5%
2011 Revised	1,368	▼15.6%
2011	1,620	▼1.9%
2006	1,652	▼7.5%
2001	1,785	▼2.3%
1996	1,827	▲2.5%
1991	1,783	N/A

=== Language ===
**Mother tongue (2016)**

Language	Population	Pct (%)
French only	1,325	97.4%
English only	20	1.5%
Other languages	5	0.4%
Both English and French	10	0.7%
