= Miscou Island =

Island in New Brunswick, Canada

Coordinates: 47°57′N 64°32′W

Location of Miscou Island

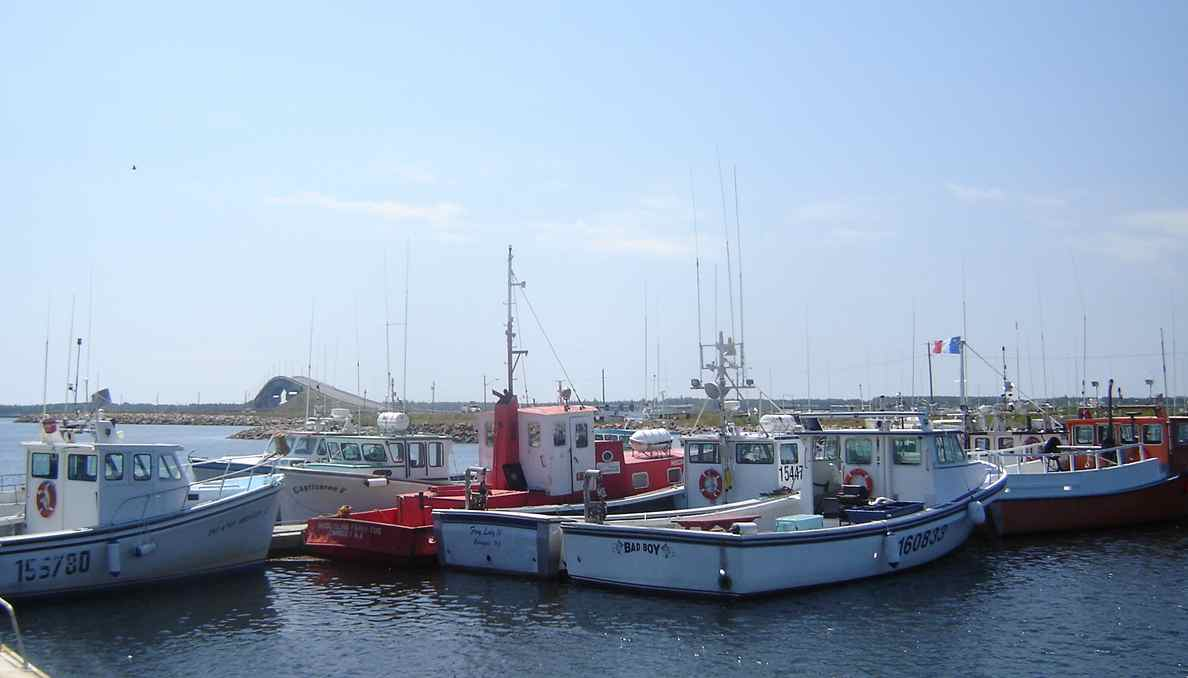
View of fishing boats on Miscou Island, showing the Miscou Island Bridge in the background.

Miscou Island (French: Île Miscou) is a Canadian island in the Gulf of St. Lawrence at the northeastern tip of Gloucester County, New Brunswick.

Map of Miscou Island

It is separated from neighbouring Lamèque Island to the southwest by the Miscou Channel with both islands forming Miscou Harbour. Lamèque Island and Miscou Island separate Chaleur Bay from the Gulf of Saint Lawrence.

Miscou Island is from the Mi'kmaq 'Susqu,' meaning "low land" or "boggy marsh". "It forms an admirable descriptive name, for the most striking fact about the physical geography of Miscou is the prevalence of open bogs..." (Ganong)

The Miscou Channel is bridged between the community of Little Shippegan on Lamèque Island to the community of Miscou Harbour on Miscou Island by the Miscou Island Bridge which opened in 1996, replacing a cable ferry and physically connecting Route 113.

The island formed its own local service district from 1980 until the end of 2022; it now comprises the Acadian Peninsula rural district.

== History ==
The Miscou Island area was one of the first areas explored by Jacques Cartier in 1534 and was a fishing base for Basque fishermen in the same period. A Jesuit mission was established at Miscou Harbour in 1634. It was an important, although seasonal, port of commerce in its early years of European exploration of Canada.

Natives were allegedly frightened to go to the island due to the legendary GouGou monster which inhabited Miscou and which they feared. Despite this native hunters annually overcame their fear of the monster to set up seasonal camps on the island.

The first permanent settler was John Campbell who emigrated from Scotland and moved there around 1817. Soon after came Robert Harper, John Marks, Thomas Cowan and Andrew Wilson; the first 3 married Campbell's daughters. They were followed by fishermen from the Channel Islands of Jersey and Guernsey who processed codfish at the Northern tip of the island to ship back to Europe and Acadians who settled on more arable lands in the interior.

On April 28, 1939, Vladimir Kokkinaki, flying a Russian monoplane made an emergency crash landing on the island, while attempting a non-stop flight from Moscow to New York, later known as the "Moscow-Miscou" flight.

In 1990, the island served as one of the shooting locations for Lodge Kerrigan's 1993 film Clean, Shaven.

== Community ==
The island is home to an unincorporated area that is eponymously named Miscou Island. It is recognized as a designated place by Statistics Canada, which had a population of 551 in 2021.

== Economy ==
The major industry is fishing, primarily lobster and herring.

=== Tourism ===
A tourism information centre is located at Miscou Harbour and open during the summer months. There are campgrounds and restaurants open seasonally, as well as cottage rentals.

There are several boardwalks and information areas located on the peat moss and other interesting natural habitats on the island. The island is also known for the Miscou Island Lighthouse, which was built in 1856 and is located at the northeastern tip of the island. In the summer it is open for guided tours; there is also a cafe and gift shop. The lighthouse was designated a National Historic Site of Canada in 1974.

The island's sand dunes and lagoons host a variety of migratory birds, including the rare piping plover, Charadrius melodus melodus, making the island a favourite location for birding and naturalists. Miscou is a favourite spot for kitesurfing, kayaking, and for sport-fishing of striped-bass.

== Conservation ==
Unlike neighbouring areas the peat moss on the island has not been harvested and is left in its natural state. Miscou Island won a 2010 Phoenix Award honouring conservation efforts in the North American tourism industry. It was described as "one of the single most beautiful spots in the world."

== See also ==
- Acadian Peninsula
- Lamèque Island
- Shippagan, New Brunswick
- List of communities in New Brunswick
- List of islands of New Brunswick
