= Saint-Sauveur, New Brunswick =

Coordinates: 47.529538°N 65.270098°W

Saint-Sauveur is an unincorporated place in New Brunswick, Canada. It is recognized as a designated place by Statistics Canada.

== Demographics ==
In the 2021 Census of Population conducted by Statistics Canada, Saint-Sauveur had a population of 598 living in 287 of its 296 total private dwellings, a change of -11.1% from its 2016 population of 673. With a land area of 170.34 km^{2} (65.77 sq mi), it had a population density of 3.5/km^{2} (9.1/sq mi) in 2021.

== See also ==
- List of communities in New Brunswick
