= List of protected areas of New Brunswick =

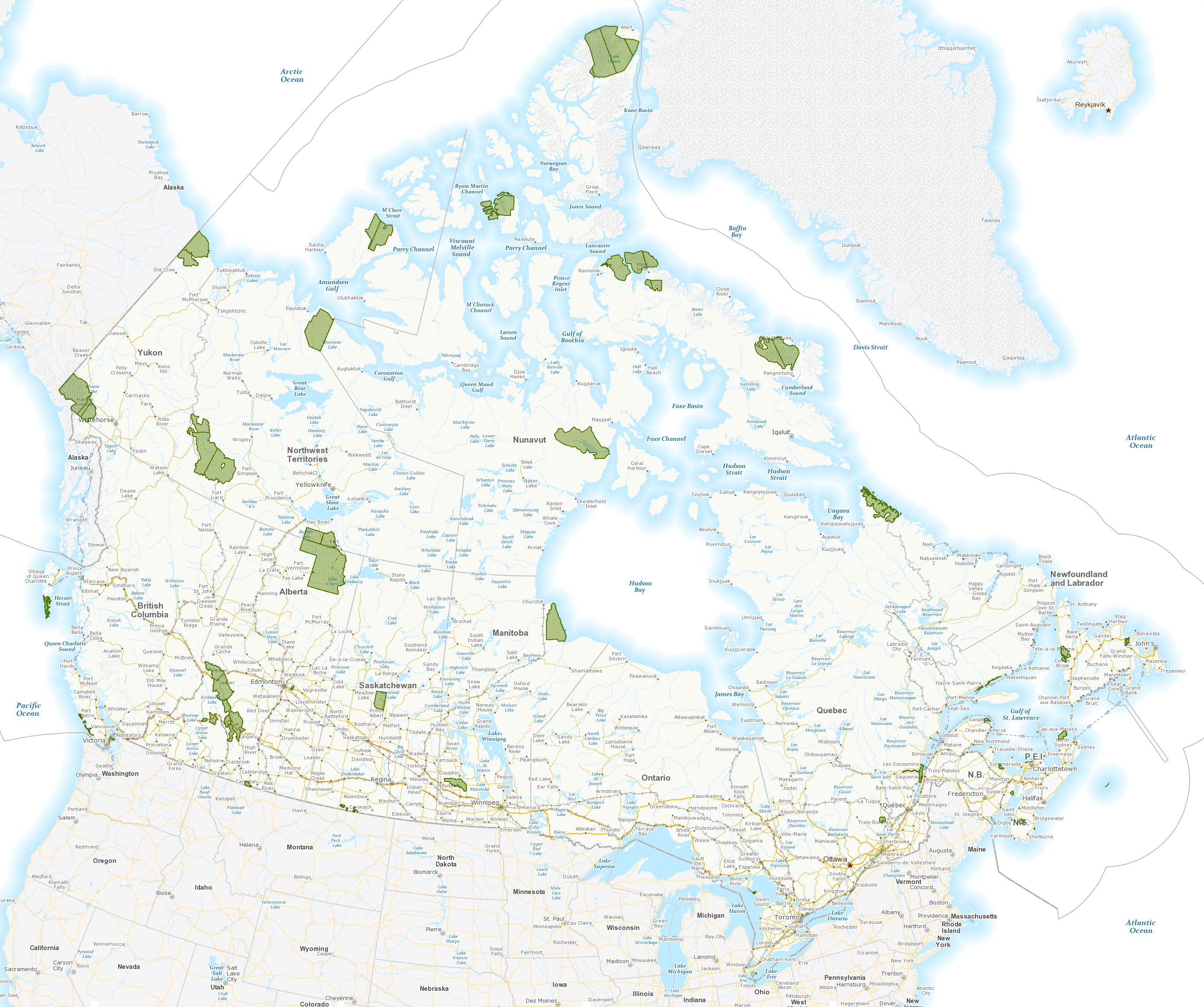
Canada's National Parks and National Reserves by provinces and territories

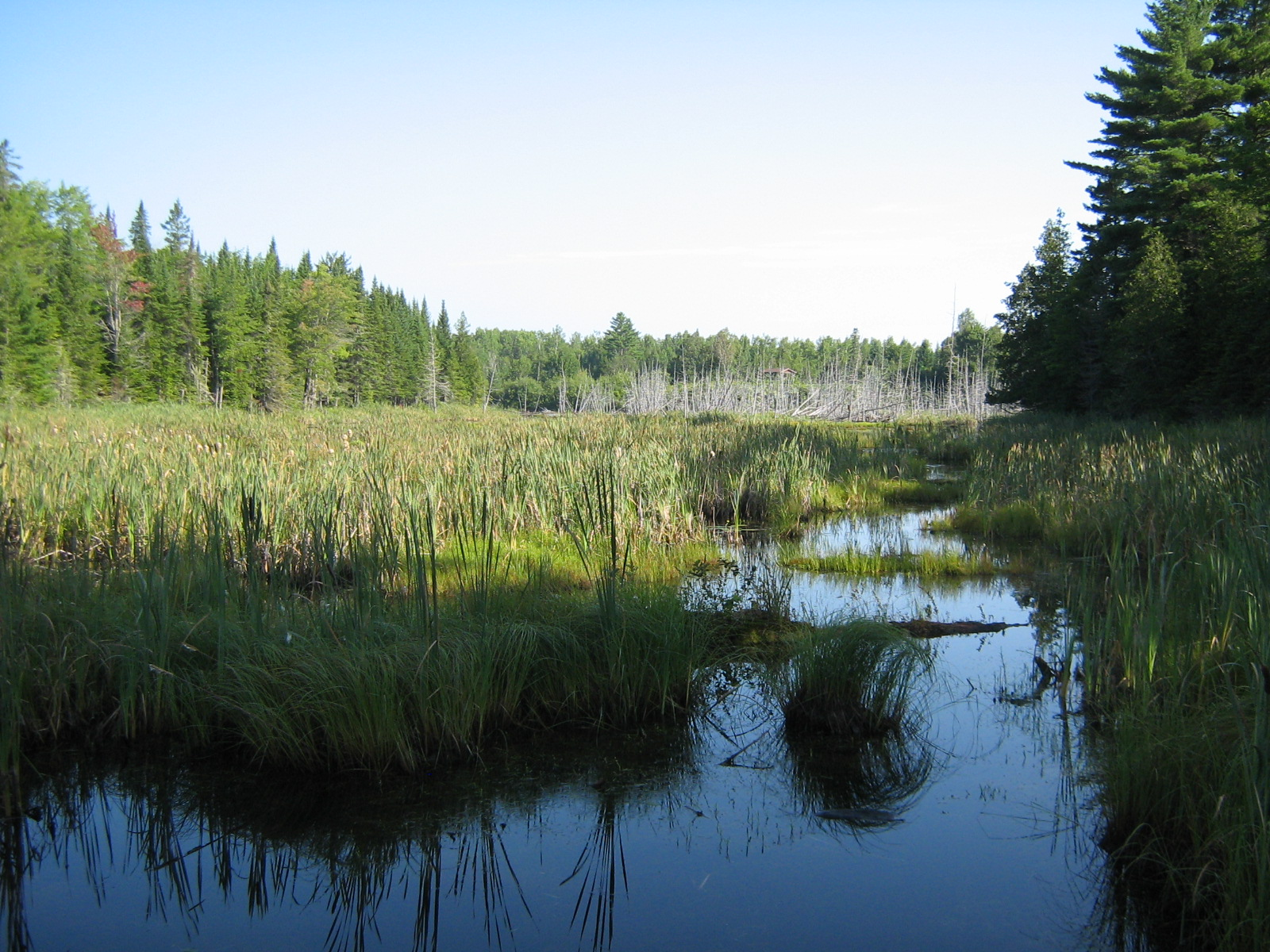
Beaver pond, Mactaquac Provincial Park

This is a list of protected natural areas of New Brunswick.

== Provincial statute ==
Provincial parks are managed provincially by Department of Tourism, Heritage and Culture or the Department of Natural Resources. Under the New Brunswick Parks Act, provincial parks are protected from environmental encroachment, and mining, quarries and logging activities are prohibited, per amendments to the Act approved in June, 2014. The wording of the Act, at the time it was enacted, included the following:

All provincial parks are dedicated to residents of the Province, visitors and future generations to:

(a) permanently protect ecosystems, biodiversity and the elements of natural and cultural heritage,
(b) provide opportunities for recreational and outdoor educational activities to promote a healthy lifestyle,
(c) provide opportunities to increase knowledge and appreciation of the natural and cultural heritage of the Province, and

(d) offer a tourism product that enhances the Province’s image as a quality vacation destination."

== Protected areas ==
=== National parks ===
The following are National Parks of Canada in New Brunswick.

| Official name | Closest Municipality | County | Year designated | Size km² | Notes |
|---|---|---|---|---|---|
| Fundy National Park | Alma | Albert | 1948 | 206 | |
| Kouchibouguac National Park | Richibucto | Kent | 1969 | 239 | |

=== Provincial parks ===
This is a list of current provincial parks in the Canadian province of New Brunswick. These provincial parks are maintained by the Department of Tourism, Heritage and Culture. There have been many other provincial parks.

| Name | County | Established | Commons category | Picture | Coordinates |
|---|---|---|---|---|---|
| Bonar Law Provincial Park | Kent | | | | |
| Cape Enrage Provincial Park | Albert | | | | |
| Castalia Provincial Park | Charlotte | | | | 44.725°N 66.750555555556°W |
| Doak House Provincial Park | Northumberland | | | | |
| Fundy Trail Parkway Provincial Park | Saint John | | | | 45.408333333333°N 65.428888888889°W |
| Herring Cove Provincial Park | Charlotte | | | | 44.8767°N 66.9368°W |
| Hopewell Rocks Provincial Park | Albert | | Hopewell Rocks | | 45.82333333°N 64.57333333°W |
| Lepreau Falls Provincial Park | Charlotte | 1956 | | | 45.168333333333°N 66.460277777778°W |
| MacDonald Farm Provincial Park | Northumberland | | | | |
| Mactaquac Provincial Park | York | 1965 | Mactaquac Provincial Park | | 45.959°N 66.8926°W |
| Ministers Island Provincial Park | Charlotte | | | | |
| Miscou Provincial Park | Gloucester | | | | |
| Mount Carleton Provincial Park | Restigouche, Northumberland | | Mount Carleton Provincial Park | | 47.3783°N 66.875°W |
| Murray Beach Provincial Park | Westmorland | 1959 | Murray Beach Provincial Park | | 46.18°N 63.98194444°W |
| New River Beach Provincial Park | Charlotte | 1960 | | | 45.127777777778°N 66.524722222222°W |
| Oak Bay Provincial Park | Charlotte | 1955 | | | 45.226666666667°N 67.189722222222°W |
| Parlee Beach Provincial Park | Westmorland | | Parlee Beach Provincial Park | | 46.241222222222°N 64.516583333333°W |
| République Provincial Park | Madawaska | | Parc provincial de la République | | 47.438333333333°N 68.393055555556°W |
| Saint Croix Provincial Park | Charlotte | | | | 45.133727°N 67.114245°W |
| Sheriff Andrews House Provincial Park | Charlotte | | | | |
| Sugarloaf Provincial Park | Restigouche | | | | 47.9767°N 66.6728°W |
| The Anchorage Provincial Park | Charlotte | | | | 44.6597°N 66.8042°W |
| Val-Comeau Provincial Park | Gloucester | | | | 47.473333333333°N 64.872222222222°W |
| Village Historique Acadien Provincial Park | Gloucester | | | | |

=== Protected natural areas ===
A Protected Natural Area (PNA) is a sanctuary set aside for its unusual or significant local characteristics. Logging is prohibited in all PNAs. Six of the more than 200 PNAs are Class I, allowing access only for scientific research and education and requiring a permit to visit; the remainder are Class II, allowing hunting, fishing, snaring, and light recreational activities like hiking and camping. PNAs sometimes overlap provincial game refuges and wildlife management areas.

With the proclamation of the Protected Natural Areas Act in 2003, 30 existing conservation and ecological areas were converted to PNAs, 20 Class I and 10 Class II. In 2008 most Class I PNAs were downgraded and more than thirty new reserves were added, with two existing PNAs merged and another one split. More than 140 new PNAs were set aside in 2014 by the outgoing Alward government.

| Denotes Class I PNA |

| Official name | Closest Municipality | County | designated | Size km^{2} | Description/Notes |
|---|---|---|---|---|---|
| Adder Lakes | | Northumberland | 2014 | | |
| Allardville | Bathurst | Gloucester | 2014 | | |
| Andersonville | | Charlotte | 2014 | | |
| Angle Hill Lake | | Carleton | 2014 | | |
| Ayers Lake Stream | | York | 2014 | | |
| Baillie Settlement | | Charlotte | 2008 | | |
| Baker Brook | Haut-Madawaska | Madawaska | 2014 | | |
| Bantalor | | York | 2014 | | |
| Bass Brook | | Gloucester | 2014 | | |
| Bass River | | Gloucester | 2014 | | |
| Bay du Vin Island | | Northumberland | 2003 | | downgraded 2008 |
| Becaguimec Stream | | Carleton | 2014 | | |
| Bellefond | | Northumberland | 2014 | | |
| Belleville | | Carleton | 2014 | | |
| Bells Brook | | Restigouche | 2014 | | |
| Belone Brook | | Restigouche | 2014 | | |
| Berry Brook | Kedgwick | Restigouche | 2008 | | |
| Big Bald Mountain | | Northumberland | 2008 | | |
| Big Cedar Brook | | Restigouche | 2014 | | |
| Big Falls | | York | 2014 | | |
| Big Meadows | | Albert | 2014 | | |
| Big Rocky Brook | | Northumberland | 2008 | | |
| Big Salmon River | | Saint John | 2014 | | |
| Black River | | Kent, Northumberland | 2003 | | |
| Blind Brook | | Kent | 2014 | | |
| Blind Gully Brook | | Victoria | 2014 | | |
| Blue Mountain | | Victoria | 2003 | | downgraded 2008 |
| Blueberry Brook | | Restigouche | 2014 | | |
| Boland Brook | | Restigouche | 2014 | | |
| Brantville | | Northumberland | 2014 | | |
| Brookvale | | Queens | 2014 | | |
| Bull Pasture Bog | | Sunbury | 2008 | | part of Grand Lake Meadows 2003 |
| Burgess Settlement | | Victoria | 2014 | | |
| Burpee Lake | | Sunbury | 2014 | | |
| Butte à Morrison | | Gloucester | 2014 | | |
| Cains River | | York | 2008 | | |
| Caledonia Gorge | Riverside-Albert | Albert | 2003 | | |
| Canaan Bog | | Kent, Queens, Westmorland | 2003 | | |
| Canoose Flowage | | Charlotte | 2003 | | |
| Carr Falls Brook | | York | 2014 | | |
| Cat Road | | Albert | 2014 | | |
| Caughey-Taylor | | Charlotte | 2014 | | |
| Clark Point | | Charlotte | 2014 | | |
| Clarke Brook | | Carleton | 2008 | | downgraded 2008 |
| Connors Brook | | Restigouche | 2014 | | |
| Cowlily Pond Brook | | Charlotte | 2014 | | |
| Cranberry Lake | | Queens | 2003 | | |
| Dead Creek | | York | 2014 | | |
| Demerchant Brook | | Victoria | 2014 | | |
| Dionne Brook | Kedgwick | Restigouche | 2008 | | |
| Dipper Harbour Back Cove | | Saint John | 2014 | | |
| Dowdall Lake | | Saint John | 2008 | | |
| Downs Gulch | | Restigouche | 2014 | | |
| Dungarvon | | Northumberland | 2014 | | |
| Dungarvon Whooper Spring Woodlot | Miramichi River Valley | Northumberland | 2008 | | |
| East Branch Portage River | | Gloucester, Northumberland | 2014 | | |
| East Cloverdale | | Carleton, York | 2014 | | |
| Eel River | | York | 2008 | | |
| Eight Mile Brook | | Restigouche | 2014 | | |
| Estey Wetlands | | York | 2014 | | |
| Falls Brook | | Madawaska | 2014 | | |
| First Eel Lake | | York | 2014 | | |
| Five Mile Brook | | Restigouche | 2014 | | |
| Foley Island | Haut-Madawaska | Madawaska | 2008 | | |
| Freeze Lakes | | Northumberland | 2003 | | downgraded 2008 |
| Gaspereau | | Sunbury | 2014 | | |
| Glazier Lake | Haut-Madawaska | Madawaska | 2003 | | downgraded 2008 |
| Golden Ridge | | Carleton | 2014 | | |
| Goodfellow Brook | | Northumberland | 2008 | | |
| Goose Lake | | Gloucester | 2008 | | |
| Gooseberry Cove | | Saint John | 2008 | | |
| Gordon Meadow Brook | | Gloucester | 2014 | | |
| Goulette Brook | | Restigouche | 2008 | | |
| Gover Mountain | Tobique Valley | Northumberland | 2003 | | downgraded 2008 |
| Grand Lake | Minto | Queens, Sunbury | 2008 | | most of Grand Lake Meadows PNA in 2003 |
| Green Brook | | Northumberland | 2014 | | |
| Green Island | | Carleton | 2014 | | |
| Green River North | | Madawaska | 2014 | | |
| Greer Creek | | York | 2014 | | |
| Grew Brook | Haut-Madawaska | Madawaska | 2014 | | |
| Halls Shed Lake | | Restigouche | 2014 | | |
| Hay Brook | | York | 2014 | | |
| Hells Gate Hardwoods | | Northumberland | 2014 | | |
| High Duck Island | Grand Manan | Charlotte | 2014 | | |
| Hovey Hill | | Kings | 2003 | 0.4 | |
| Howard Brook | | Carleton | 2008 | | |
| Indian Brook | | Victoria | 2014 | | |
| Jacquet River Gorge | | Gloucester, Restigouche | 2003 | | |
| Jardine Brook | | Restigouche | 2014 | | |
| Johnson's Mills | | Westmorland | 2014 | | |
| Kennedy Lakes | | Northumberland | 2003 | | |
| Lake Stream | | Kent | 2014 | | |
| Lakeville | | Carleton | 2014 | | |
| Lewis Mountain | | Albert | 2014 | | |
| Little Cedar Brook | | Restigouche | 2014 | | |
| Little Forks Brook | | Sunbury | 2014 | | |
| Little River | | Sunbury | 2014 | | |
| Little Salmon River | | Saint John | 2003 | | downgraded 2008 |
| Little Southwest Miramichi River | | Northumberland | 2014 | | |
| Little Tomoowa Lake | | Charlotte | 2003 | | downgraded 2008 |
| Loch Alva | Grand Bay–Westfield | Kings, Queens, Saint John | 2003 | | Originally two PNAs (Class I and II), merged in 2008 |
| Lord and Foy Brook | | Gloucester | 2014 | | |
| Lower North Branch Little Southwest Miramichi River | | Northumberland | 2014 | | |
| MacFarlane Brook | Kedgwick | Restigouche | 2008 | | |
| Magaguadavic River | | Charlotte | 2014 | | |
| Martial Brook | | Madawaska | 2014 | | |
| Maxwell | | York | 2014 | | |
| McBean Brook | | York | 2014 | | |
| McCarty Brook | | Northumberland | 2014 | | |
| McCluskey Brook | | Carleton | 2014 | | |
| McCoy Brook | Edmundston | Madawaska | 2003 | | downgraded 2008 |
| McDougalls Brook | Balmoral | Restigouche | 2008 | | |
| McLean Settlement | | Kent | 2014 | | |
| McManus Hill | | Kings | 2003 | | downgraded 2008 |
| McNeal Brook | | Northumberland | 2014 | | |
| McPhersons Point | | Charlotte | 2014 | | |
| Meduxnekeag Valley | | Carleton | 2014 | | |
| Meto'mqwijuig Mountain | | Restigouche | 2014 | | Named changed from Squaw Cap Mountain in 2023 |
| Mill Brook | | Carleton | 2014 | | |
| Mill Stream-Mactaquac | | York | 2014 | | |
| Miller Brook | | Northumberland | 2014 | | |
| Miscou Grande Plaine | | Gloucester | 2008 | | |
| Monument Brook | | York | 2014 | | |
| Moose Valley Hill | | Madawaska, Restigouche | 2014 | | |
| Mount Akroyd | | Restigouche | 2014 | | |
| Mount Denys | | Northumberland | 2014 | | |
| Mount Elizabeth | | Northumberland | 2003 | | downgraded 2008 |
| Mount Tom | | Albert | 2014 | | |
| Musquash Estuary | Saint John | Saint John | 2014 | | replaced Musquash PNA |
| Nalaisk Mountain | | Northumberland | 2014 | | |
| Nashwaak River | | York | 2014 | | |
| Nepisiguit | | Northumberland | 2008 | | replaced Mount Carleton Extension PNA |
| New River | | Charlotte | 2008 | | |
| Nictau | | Victoria | 2014 | | |
| North and South Green Islands | Grand Manan | Charlotte | 2014 | | |
| North Branch Burnt Church River | | Northumberland | 2014 | | |
| North Lake | | York | 2014 | | |
| North Pole Stream | | Northumberland | 2014 | | |
| Northwest Upsalquitch River | | Restigouche | 2014 | | |
| Oak Mountain | | Carleton, York | 2003 | | downgraded 2008 |
| Oakland Mountain | | Carleton | 2014 | | |
| Otter Brook | | York | 2014 | | |
| Oven Rock Brook | | Victoria | 2014 | | |
| Ovenhead | | Charlotte | 2014 | | |
| Partridge Valley East | | Queens | 2014 | | |
| Partridge Valley West | | Queens | 2014 | | |
| Patapedia River | | Restigouche | 2014 | | |
| Patchell Brook | Tobique Valley | Northumberland | 2008 | | |
| Phillipstown | | Queens | 2003 | | downgraded 2008 |
| Picadilly Mountain | | Kings | 2008 | | |
| Pisiguit Brook | | Gloucester | 2014 | | |
| Pocologan | | Charlotte | 2014 | | |
| Pocowogamis Stream | | York | 2014 | | |
| Point Wolfe River Gorge | | Kings, Saint John | 2003 | | downgraded 2008 |
| Pokeshaw | | Gloucester | 2014 | | |
| Pokiok River | | Victoria | 2014 | | |
| Pokiok Stream | | York | 2014 | | |
| Pollard Brook | Kedgwick | Restigouche | 2008 | | |
| Popelogan Depot | | Restigouche | 2014 | | |
| Porcupine Mountain | | Carleton, Victoria | 2014 | | |
| Portage Lakes | | Restigouche | 2014 | | |
| Quigley Brook | | Restigouche | 2014 | | |
| Quisibis Mountain | | Madawaska | 2014 | | |
| Quisibis River | | Madawaska | 2014 | | |
| Ragged Falls | | Charlotte | 2014 | | |
| Red Pine Brook | | Gloucester | 2014 | | |
| Richibucto River | | Kent | 2014 | | |
| Risteen Brook | | York | 2014 | | |
| River de Chute | | Carleton | 2014 | | |
| Round Meadow Cove | | Saint John | 2014 | | |
| Saddleback Brook | | Kings; Saint John | 2014 | | |
| St. Croix River Islands | | Charlotte | 2003 | | downgraded in 2008, upgraded in 2014 |
| Salkeld Islands | | Charlotte | 2014 | | |
| Semiwagan Meadows | | Northumberland | 2014 | | |
| Shikatehawk Stream | | Carleton | 2014 | | |
| Shinnickburn | | Northumberland | 2008 | | |
| Sills Brook | | York | 2014 | | |
| Skiff Lake | | York | 2014 | | |
| Smith Brook | | Carleton | 2014 | | |
| South Branch Big Sevogle River | | Northumberland | 2014 | | |
| South Branch Burnt Church River | | Northumberland | 2014 | | |
| South Kedgwick River | Kedgwick | Restigouche | 2003 | | downgraded 2008 |
| Spednic Lake | | York | 2003 | | |
| Spud Brook | | Northumberland | 2014 | | |
| Stickney | | Carleton | 2014 | | |
| Stillwater Brook | | Restigouche | 2014 | | |
| Stony Brook | | Northumberland | 2014 | | |
| Tabusintac | | Northumberland | 2003 | | downgraded 2008 |
| Tabusintac River | | Gloucester, Northumberland | 2014 | | |
| Tamarack Brook | | York | 2014 | | |
| Tauadook River | | Northumberland | 2014 | | |
| Tay River | Nashwaak | York | 2008 | | |
| Trout Brook | | Kent | 2014 | | |
| Two Mile Brook Fen | | Carleton | 2008 | | |
| Upham Brook | | Albert | 2014 | | |
| Upper Dungarvon River | | Northumberland | 2014 | | |
| Upper Salmon River | | Albert | 2014 | | |
| Upper Thorn Point Brook | | Restigouche | 2008 | | |
| Upsalquitch Forks | | Restigouche | 2008 | | |
| Welch Brook | | Carleton | 2014 | | |
| West Branch Coy Brook | | Kent; Queens | 2014 | | |
| Western Green Island | Grand Manan | Charlotte | 2014 | | |
| Whitehorse Island | | Charlotte | 2008 | | |
| Williamstown Lake | | Carleton | 2008 | | |
| Wilson Brook | | Albert | 2003 | 0.77 | |
| Woodman | | York | 2014 | | |

=== Provincial wildlife areas ===
The Wildlife Refuges and Wildlife Management Areas Regulation - Fish and Wildlife Act governs the province's game refuges and wildlife management areas. Hunting and trapping are prohibited in these areas.

| Official name | County | Designated | Size (km^{2}) | Description/Notes |
|---|---|---|---|---|
| Fredericton Wildlife Refuge | York | | | |
| Kindness Club Wildlife Refuge | Carleton | | | |
| O'dell Wildlife Refuge | York | | 1.41 | |
| University of New Brunswick Wildlife Refuge | York | | 0.06 | |
| Utopia Wildlife Refuge | Charlotte | | 31.08 | |
| Wilson's Point Wildlife Refuge | Northumberland | | 0.54 | tip of peninsula opposite Beaubears Island |
| Acadian Village Wildlife Management Area | Gloucester | | | |
| Bantalor Wildlife Management Area | York | | 152.81 | |
| Becaguimec Wildlife Management Area | Carleton, York | | 111.37 | |
| Burpee Wildlife Management Area | Sunbury, York | | 181.69 | |
| Canaan River Wildlife Management Area | Westmorland | | 225.33 | |
| Mount Ararat Wildlife Management Area | Queens | | 2.61 | three parcels in Arcadia area |
| Kedgwick Wildlife Management Area | Restigouche | | 828.80 | |
| Kings Landing Wildlife Management Area | York | | 1315.00 | surrounds Kings Landing Historical Settlement |
| Lepreau River Wildlife Management Area | Charlotte, Kings, Queens | | 243.46 | |
| MacDonald Farm Wildlife Management Area | Northumberland | | 0.61 | |
| Minister's Island Wildlife Management Area | Charlotte | | 2.02 | |
| Mount Carleton Wildlife Management Area | Northumberland, Restigouche | | 174.03 | |
| Plaster Rock-Renous Wildlife Management Area | Northumberland, Victoria, York | | 841.75 | |
| Tracadie River Wildlife Management Area | Gloucester | | 39.14 | |
| West Collette Wildlife Management Area | Northumberland | | 0.78 | |

=== Other ===
| Official name | Closest Municipality | County | Type | designated | Size km^{2} | Notes |
|---|---|---|---|---|---|---|
| Cape Jourimain National Wildlife Area | | Westmorland | National Wildlife Area | 1980 | 6.21 | |
| Portage Island National Wildlife Area | Neguac | Northumberland | National Wildlife Area | 1979 | 4.51 | |
| Portobello Creek National Wildlife Area | | Sunbury | National Wildlife Area | 1995 | 19.90 | |
| Shepody National Wildlife Area | Riverside-Albert | Albert | National Wildlife Area | 1980 | 9.89 | |
| Tintamarre National Wildlife Area | Sackville | Westmorland | National Wildlife Area | 1977 | 19.90 | |
| Roosevelt Campobello International Park | Campobello Island | Charlotte | International Park | 1964 | 11 | |
| Grand Manan Bird Sanctuary | Grand Manan | Charlotte | Bird Sanctuary | 1931 | 2.5 | |
| Inkerman Bird Sanctuary | | Gloucester | Bird Sanctuary | 1931 | 2.5 | |
| Machias Seal Island Bird Sanctuary | Grand Manan | Charlotte | Bird Sanctuary | 1944 | 0.1 | |

== See also ==
- List of Canadian protected areas
- List of national parks of Canada
- List of National Historic Sites of Canada in New Brunswick
- List of historic places in New Brunswick
