= Acadian Peninsula =

Peninsula in New Brunswick, Canada

Coordinates: 47°30′N 65°10′W

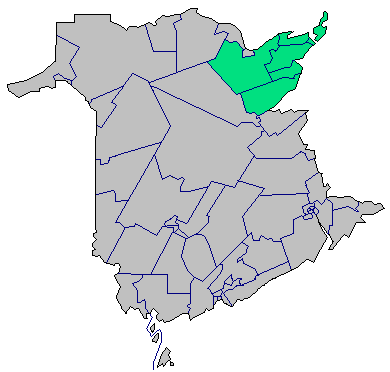
New Brunswick electoral districts, with districts of the peninsula highlighted in green

The Acadian Peninsula

The Acadian Peninsula (French: Péninsule acadienne) is situated in the northeastern corner of New Brunswick, Canada, encompassing portions of Gloucester and Northumberland Counties. It derives its name from the large Acadian population located there. Two major islands off the northeast tip of the peninsula, Lamèque Island and Miscou Island, are culturally considered part of the Acadian Peninsula.

Most settlement in the peninsula occurred as a result of the Expulsion of the Acadians during the Gulf of St. Lawrence Campaign (1758), where British personnel forcibly removed them from their homes, mostly in southern New Brunswick and Nova Scotia.

Fishing is the dominant industry on the peninsula, with a large agricultural sector as well. The disappearance of the Lady Audette and Lady Dorianne vessels in 1970/71 shocked the peninsula. Peat bogs are found in the Shippagan and Lameque areas.

== List of major towns ==
Major towns on the Acadian Peninsula include:

- Caraquet
- Shippagan
- Tracadie
- Neguac
- Lamèque (on Lamèque Island)

== See also ==
- Acadian World Congress
