= Shippagan =

- Town
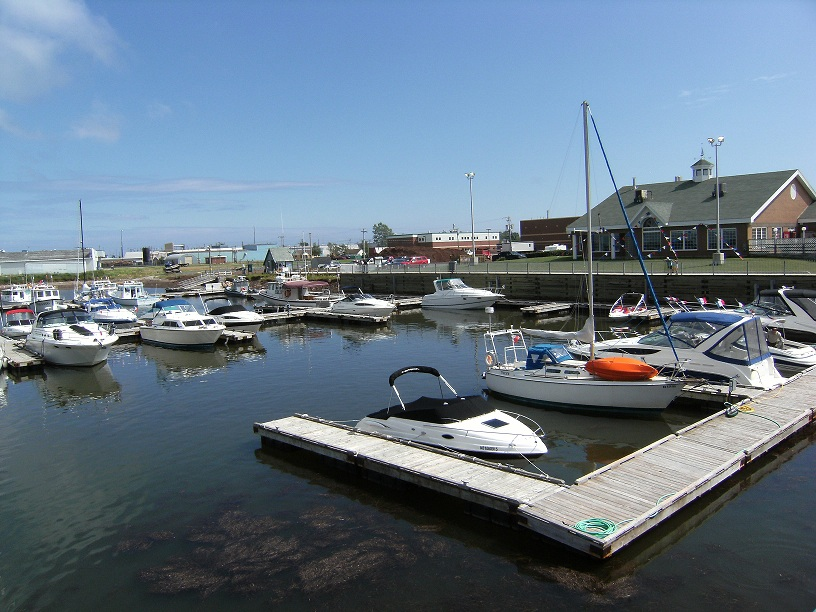
- The Marina in Shippagan

- Location within New Brunswick.
- Coordinates: 47.743889°N 64.717778°W
- Country: Canada
- Province: New Brunswick
- County: Gloucester
- Parish: Shippegan
- Founded: 1790

Government
  - Type: Town Council
  - Mayor: Kassim Doumbia

Area
  - Land: 9.96 km^{2} (3.85 sq mi)

Population (2021)
  - Total: 2,672
  - Density: 268.3/km^{2} (695/sq mi)
  - Change (2016–21): ▲3.6%
  - Dwellings: 1,274
- Time zone: UTC-4 (AST)
  - Summer (DST): UTC-3 (ADT)
- Postal code(s): E8S
- Area code: 506
- Website: www.shippagan.ca

Shippagan is a Canadian town within (Note: Under the Interpretation Act parishes include the municipalities within their borders; Statistics Canada treats parishes as census subdivisions that exclude the municipalities.) Shippegan Parish, Gloucester County, New Brunswick.

The parish retains the original English spelling, while the town officially adopted the colloquial French spelling on 1 July 1981.

Shippagan was greatly enlarged on 1 January 2023, when it amalgamated with Le Goulet and all or part of seven local service districts Revised census figures have not been released.

== Geography ==
Shippagan is located in the northeastern part of the Acadian Peninsula: a combination bridge-causeway connects the town with Lamèque Island to the northeast.

The peninsula is approximately 5 km (3 miles) long and at maximum 5 km (3 miles) wide, bordered on the north-west by Shippagan Bay, to the north by Shippagan harbour to the east by the Gulf of Saint Lawrence and to the west by St Simon's Bay.

Approximately 99% of the town's residents are Francophone.

== History ==
The town was founded by Jean Mallet (son of Francois Mallet and Marie Madeleine Larocque) and Marie Josephte Duguay (daughter of Rene Duguay and Marguerite LeBreton) from Paspébiac, Quebec and the Robichaux family from Bonaventure, Quebec in 1790, as a result of expansion of the Charles Robin Company. Jean-Baptiste Robichaux was in 1798 the first settler from Grand Chipagan to petition the government for title to his land, in 1798; he was the son of an expelled Acadian.

The location of the town is an ideal spot for fishing, which was its first economic product, as well as exporting timber from further inland. There are also numerous peat bogs in the area, and their exploitation continues to this day.

Shippagan is home to campuses of the Université de Moncton and New Brunswick Community College.

On 25 May 2021, Shippagan elected Kassim Doumbia as mayor, making him the first Black mayor in New Brunswick.

=== Etymology ===
The name originates from the Mi'kmaq Sepagun-chiche, which roughly translates as "Ducks' transit route". This name described the immediate region rather than the specific location of the current settlement that inherited the name.

Different spellings have been applied over the years. None of the earliest known francophone explorers such as Jacques Cartier, Samuel de Champlain and Nicolas Denys mentions the name Shippagan, which appears in writing for the first time only in 1656 when Ignatius of Paris, a Capucine missionary, wrote to his superiors recommending the establishment of four or five missionary posts, one of which he called "Cibaguensi", a Latinised form of Shippagan.

During the eighteenth century various orthographies were used for the nearby settlement on the site of what is now Bas-Caraquet, most commonly Chipagan, and this is the name subsequently applied and adapted for modern-day Shippagan. Early English language texts applied the francophone spelling, "Chipagan", but from the early nineteenth centuries various anglophone variants were preferred, such as Shipagan, Ship-a-gang, Shipegan, Shippegan, Shippigan and Shippagan. By the twenty-first century custom had settled on "Town of Shippagan" which on 9 September 2009, was officially reduced to "Shippagan".

== Demographics ==
In the 2021 Canadian census conducted by Statistics Canada, Shippagan had a population of 2,672 living in 1,197 of its 1,274 total private dwellings, a change of 3.6% from its 2016 population of 2,580. With a land area of 9.96 km^{2} (3.85 sq mi), it had a population density of 268.3/km^{2} (694.8/sq mi) in 2021.

Canada census – Shippagan, New Brunswick community profile

	2016	2011
Population	2,580 (-1.9% from 2011)	2,603 (-5.5% from 2006)
Land area	10.02 km^{2} (3.87 sq mi)	9.94 km^{2} (3.84 sq mi)
Population density	257.6/km^{2} (667/sq mi)	261.9/km^{2} (678/sq mi)
Median age	50.2 (M: 49.3, F: 51.3)	47.4 (M: 45.6, F: 49.2)
Private dwellings	1,225 (total)	1,211 (total)
Median household income	$51,968	$45,486

References: 2016 2011

Historical Census Data – Shippagan, New Brunswick

Year	Pop.	±%
1991	2,760	—
1996	2,862	+3.7%
2001	2,872	+0.3%

Year	Pop.	±%
2001A	2,920	+1.7%
2006	2,754	−5.7%
2011	2,603	−5.5%

Year	Pop.	±%
2011E	2,631	+1.1%
2016	2,580	−1.9%

(A) adjustment due to boundary change
(E) revised count – Population and dwelling count amendments, 2011 Census

=== Language ===
Canada Census Mother Tongue – Shippagan, New Brunswick
Census	Total	French			English			French & English			Other		
Year	Responses	Count	Trend	Pop %	Count	Trend	Pop %	Count	Trend	Pop %	Count	Trend	Pop %
2011	2,465	2,375	▼4.4%	96.35%	45	▼35.7%	1.82%	10	0.0%	0.41%	35	▲75.0%	1.42%
2006	2,585	2,485	▼7.1%	96.13%	70	▲180.0%	2.71%	10	▲ n/a%	0.39%	20	▲100.0%	0.77%
2001	2,710	2,675	▲2.1%	98.71%	25	▼64.3%	0.92%	0	▼100.0%	0.00%	10	▲ n/a%	0.37%
1996	2,700	2,620	n/a	97.04%	70	n/a	2.59%	10	n/a	0.37%	0	n/a	0.00%

== Coat of arms ==
On 15 August 2019, the town was granted a coat of arms by the Canadian Heraldic Authority, while the announcement of the Letters Patent was made on 28 March 2020, in Volume 154, page 692 of the Canada Gazette.

Coat of arms of Shippagan

Granted
15 August 2019
Crest
A demi-mallard duck wings elevated and addorsed proper holding in its beak a scroll Argent bound Azure and rising from a bed of beech leaves proper.
Escutcheon
Azure a bar gemel wavy Argent, overall an anchor, in the dexter chief a mullet Or.
Supporters
Two Atlantic cod proper issuant from barry wavy Argent and Azure flanking a bog of sphagnum moss set with cloudberry plants proper.
Motto
BÂTIR ENSEMBLE

== Notable people ==
- Luc Bourdon – an NHL ice hockey defenseman who played with the Vancouver Canucks.

== See also ==
- List of communities in New Brunswick
