= List of New Brunswick provincial highways =

New Brunswick provincial highway system
- Standard highway markers for New Brunswick

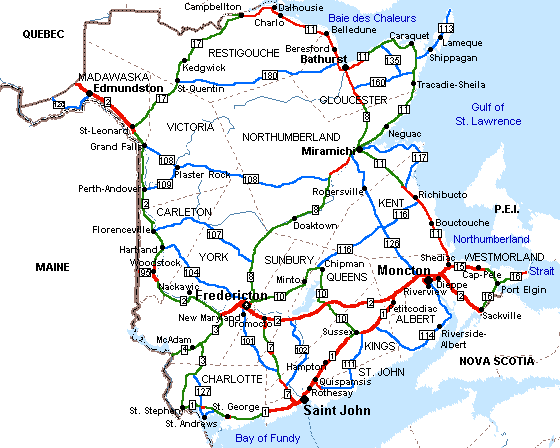
- Major highways in New Brunswick

Highway names
- Provincial Highways: New Brunswick Route XX (Route XX)

System links
- Provincial highways in New Brunswick; Former routes

This is a list of numbered provincial highways in the Canadian province of New Brunswick. These provincial highways are maintained by the Department of Transportation and Infrastructure in New Brunswick. For a list of formerly-numbered highways, see List of former New Brunswick provincial highways.

== Arterial highways ==
Marked by green signs, these highways are the primary routes in the system, and Routes 1, 2, 7, 8, 11, 15, 16 and 95 are all expressways or freeways for part or all of their length. The speed limit generally ranges from 80 to 110 km/h (50 to 68 mph), with the highest limits on four-lane freeway sections.

Route	Length (km)	Length (mi)	Southern / western terminus	Northern / eastern terminus	References
Route 1	237	147	International Avenue to US 1 in Calais	Route 2 (TCH) in River Glade	
Route 2 (TCH)	514	319	A-85 (TCH) near Edmundston	Hwy 104 (TCH) near Fort Lawrence	
Route 3	93.9	58.3	Route 170 in St. Stephen	Route 102 in Longs Creek	
Route 4	28.3	17.6	SR 6 at the Vanceboro–St. Croix Border Crossing	Route 3 in Thomaston Corner	
Route 7	96.6	60.0	Route 101 in Fredericton	Route 1 near Saint John	
Route 8	257	160	Route 2 (TCH) near Fredericton	Route 11 near Bathurst	
Route 10	144	89	Route 8 in Fredericton	Route 1 in Sussex	
Route 11	440.4	273.7	Route 2 (TCH) / Route 15 near Shediac	R-132 near Matapédia	
Route 15	78.7	48.9	Route 106 / Route 114 in Riverview	Route 16 (TCH) / Route 970 near Strait Shores	
Route 16 (TCH)	56.1	34.9	Route 2 (TCH) in Aulac	Route 1 (TCH) on the Confederation Bridge	
Route 17	145	90	Route 2 (TCH) in Saint-Léonard	Route 11 in Glencoe	
Route 95	14.5	9.0	I-95 at the Houlton–Woodstock Border Crossing	Route 2 (TCH) / Route 103 in Woodstock	

== Collector highways ==
Marked by blue signs, these secondary highways are sometimes the old alignments of primary highways or connector routes between towns or to and from primary highways. The speed limit is generally 80 km/h (50 mph).

- Route 100 -- Saint John - Rothesay - Quispamsis - Hampton
- Route 101 -- Fredericton - Tracy - Fredericton Junction - Welsford
- Route 102 -- Pokiok - Kingsclear - Fredericton - Oromocto - Arcadia - Westfield
- Route 103 -- Woodstock - Florenceville
- Route 104 -- Hartland - Nackawic-Millville - Keswick Ridge
- Route 105 -- Grand Falls - Perth-Andover - Bristol - Florenceville - Hartland - Grafton - Nackawic-Millville - Mactaquac - Fredericton - Jemseg - Youngs Cove
- Route 106 -- Three Rivers - Salisbury - Moncton - Dieppe - Memramcook - Dorchester - Sackville
- Route 107 -- Bristol - Juniper - Nashwaak - Nashwaak Bridge
- Route 108 -- Grand Falls - Tobique Valley - Renous-Quarryville - Miramichi
- Route 109 -- Perth-Andover - Tobique Valley
- Route 110 -- Florenceville - Centreville - U.S. border at Bridgewater, Maine
- Route 111 -- Rothesay - Saint John Airport - Fundy-St. Martins - Sussex Corner
- Route 112 -- Coles Island - Canaan Forks - Salisbury - Riverview
- Route 113 -- Pokemouche - Shippagan - Lamèque - Miscou Island
- Route 114 -- Sussex - Fundy National Park - Riverside-Albert - Hillsborough - Riverview - Moncton
- Route 115 -- Moncton - Champdoré - Bouctouche
- Route 116 -- Upper Salmon Creek - Harcourt - Elsipogtog First Nation - Five Rivers
- Route 117 -- Kouchibouguac National Park - Baie-Sainte-Anne - Miramichi
- Route 118 -- Miramichi River Valley - Miramichi
- Route 119 -- Quispamsis - Gondola Point
- Route 120 -- Edmundston - Baker Brook - Lac-Baker - Quebec border at Saint-Jean-de-la-Lande
- Route 121 -- Hampton - Valley Waters - Sussex - Sussex Corner
- Route 122 -- Lakeland Ridges - Fosterville - U.S. border at Orient, Maine
- Route 123 -- Chipman - Doaktown
- Route 124 -- Evandale - Springfield - Valley Waters
- Route 126 -- Moncton - Harcourt - Nouvelle-Arcadie - Miramichi
- Route 127 -- Lawrence Station - St. Andrews - Digdeguash
- Route 128 -- Moncton - Berry Mills
- Route 130 -- Grand Falls - Grand Falls Portage - Aroostook - Perth-Andover - Florenceville-Bristol - Hartland - Waterville
- Route 132 -- Dieppe - Scoudouc - Shediac
- Route 133 -- Shediac - Cap-Pele
- Route 134 -- Moncton - Shediac - Bouctouche - Five Rivers - Richibucto - St-Louis-de-Kent / Allardville - Bathurst - Beresford - Belledune - Charlo - Dalhousie - Campbellton
- Route 135 -- Pokeshaw - Hautes-Terres
- Route 140 -- Shediac (Ohio Road)
- Route 144 -- Edmundston - Saint-Léonard - Grand Falls
- Route 145 -- Caraquet - Bas-Caraquet
- Route 148 -- Fredericton - Nashwaak Village
- Route 150 -- Tracadie-Sheila - Losier Settlement - Six Roads
- Route 160 -- Allardville - Hautes-Terres - Losier Settlement
- Route 161 -- Caron Brook - Clair
- Route 165 -- Woodstock - Lakeland Ridges
- Route 170 -- St. Stephen - Waweig
- Route 172 -- St. George - L'Etete
- Route 175 -- Pennfield - Lepreau
- Route 176 -- Pennfield - Blacks Harbour
- Route 177 -- Grand Bay - Westfield
- Route 180 -- Saint-Quentin - Bathurst
- Route 190 -- Perth-Andover - U.S. border at Fort Fairfield, Maine

== Local highways ==
Marked by black signs, these are the tertiary routes that fill out the highway network and connect small communities and areas to more important highways. The speed limit is generally 80 km/h (50 mph) or lower depending on road design standards.

- Route 205 -- Clair - Saint-François-de-Madawaska - Connors
- Route 215 -- Saint-François-de-Madawaska - Lac Unique - Route 289 (Quebec)
- Route 218 -- Grand Falls - U.S. border crossing at Hamlin, Maine
- Route 255 -- Saint-André - Route 17
- Route 260 -- Rang-Douze-Sud - Rang-Quatorze - Limerick - Saint-Martin-de-Restigouche - Thibault - Kedgwick
- Route 265 -- Kedgwick River - Six-Milles - Quatre-Milles - Rang-Double-Nord
- Route 275 -- Glencoe - Val-Melanson - Saint-Arthur - McKendrick - Maltais - Blair Athol - Upper Balmoral - Balmoral - Selwood - Eel River Crossing - Darlington
- Route 280 -- McLeods - Upper Dundee - Shannonvale - Dundee - Eel River Cove - Charlo
- Route 303 -- Dugas - Village-des-Poirier - Maisonnette
- Route 305 -- Lamèque - Ste-Marie-St-Raphaël - Pigeon Hill
- Route 310 -- Lamèque Island (Coteau Road)
- Route 313 -- Lamèque - Petite-Lamèque - Petite-Rivière-de-l'Ile - Petit-Shippagan
- Route 315 -- Bathurst - Dunlop - Nigadoo - LaPlante - Petit-Rocher
- Route 320 -- Grande-Anse - Anse-Bleue - Maisonnette
- Route 322 -- Bathurst - Robertville - Saint-Laurent - Nigadoo
- Route 325 -- Caraquet - Bertrand - Trudel
- Route 330 -- Black Rock - Saint-Léolin - Grande-Anse
- Route 335 -- Caraquet - Saint-Simon - Evangeline
- Route 340 -- Janeville - Notre-Dame-des-Erables - Hautes-Terres
- Route 345 -- Pokemouche - Evangeline - Inkerman Ferry
- Route 350 -- Hautes-Terres - Maltampec - Pokemouche
- Route 355 -- Bois-Blanc - Sainte-Rose - Six Roads
- Route 360 -- Allardville - Middle Landing - Brunswick Mines
- Route 363 -- Saint-Sauveur - Butte D'Or - Spruce Brook - Hacheyville
- Route 365 -- Saint-Isidore - Tracadie
- Route 370 -- Riviere-du-Portage - Pont-Lafrance - Sheila
- Route 375 -- Lower Portage - US border
- Route 380 -- Lake Edward - Bell Grove - Three Brooks
- Route 385 -- Weaver - Mapleview - Burntland Brook - Oxbow - Everett - Two Brooks - Blue Mountain Bend - Riley Brook - Nictau - Mount Carleton Provincial Park - Route 180 (Saint-Quentin to Bathurst)
- Route 390 -- Tobique Valley - Wapske - Odell - Arthurette - Rowena - Tobique Narrows
- Route 395 -- Hazedean - Anfield - McLaughlin - Route 109
- Route 415 -- Renous-Quarryville - Warwick Settlement - Red Bank
- Route 420 -- Derby Junction - Red Bank - Sillikers - Interchange with Route 108 (Renous-Quarryville)
- Route 425 -- Red Bank - Sunny Corner - Whitney - Strathadam - Eel Ground - Miramichi
- Route 430 -- Miramichi -- Heath Steele—Bathurst Mines -- Bathurst
- Route 435 -- Whitney -- Maple Glen
- Route 440 -- Nouvelle-Arcadie - Shediac Ridge - Rosaireville - St. Margaret's
- Route 445 -- Lagacéville - Fairisle - Covedell
- Route 450 -- Village-Saint-Laurent - Lagacéville - Lavillette - Route 8
- Route 455 -- Neguac - Fairisle - Lavillette
- Route 460 -- Neguac - Price Settlement - Gaythorne - Tabusintac
- Route 465 -- Coal Branch - Ford's Mills - Smith's Corner
- Route 470 -- Ford's Mills - Pine Ridge - Mundleville
- Route 475 -- Bouctouche - Baie de Bouctouche - Saint-Édouard-de-Kent - Sainte-Anne-de-Kent
- Route 480 -- Kouchibouguac - Acadieville - Acadie Siding
- Route 485 -- Canaan - Route 490
- Route 490 -- Moncton - Irishtown - McLean Settlement - Pine Ridge - Browns Yard - Bass River
- Route 495 -- Five Rivers - Mundleville - Murphy Settlement - Sainte-Marie-de-Kent
- Route 505 -- Sainte-Anne-de-Kent - Richibucto-Village - Five Rivers
- Route 510 -- Mundleville - Browns Yard - Fords Mills
- Route 515 -- Hebert - McLean Settlement - Sainte-Marie-de-Kent - Bouctouche
- Route 525 -- Sainte-Marie-de-Kent - Champdoré
- Route 530 -- Grande-Digue - Caissie Cape - Cocagne
- Route 535 -- Notre-Dame - Cocagne - Saint-Francois-de-Kent
- Route 540 -- Graham Corner - Debec - Richmond Corner - Belleville
- Route 550 -- Woodstock - Bloomfield - Tracey Mills (Route 110)
- Route 555 -- Woodstock - Richmond Corner - Route 95
- Route 560 -- Woodstock - Lakeville - Centreville - River de Chute (Route 130)
- Route 565 -- Upper Kent- Holmesville - Giberson Settlement - Bath
- Route 570 -- Gordonsville - Coldstream
- Route 575 -- Hartland - Pole Hill - Cloverdale
- Route 580 -- Glassville - Lower Windsor
- Route 585 -- Woodstock - Grafton - Hawkins Corner
- Route 590 -- Jacksonville - Waterville
- Route 595 -- Bull Lake - Temperance Vale
- Route 605 -- Nackawic-Millville
- Route 610 -- Upper Queensbury - Upper Caverhill - Upper Hainesville
- Route 615 -- Mactaquac - Springfield -- Upper Caverhill
- Route 616 -- Keswick Ridge - Zealand
- Route 617 -- Burtts Corner - Birdton - Hamtown Corner
- Route 620 -- Fredericton - Tay Creek - Nashwaak
- Route 625 -- Boiestown - Parker Ridge - Cross Creek
- Route 628 -- Fredericton - Penniac - Durham Bridge - Taymouth
- Route 630 -- Lakeland Ridges - Andersonville
- Route 635 -- Lower Prince William - Lake George - Magaguadavic - York Mills
- Route 636 -- Lake George - Harvey Station
- Route 640 -- Fredericton - Hanwell - Acton
- Route 645 -- Hurley Corner - Rooth - Tracy
- Route 655 -- Nasonworth - Rusagonis-Waasis - Lincoln
- Route 670 -- Lakeville Corner - Ripples - Albrights Corner
- Route 690 -- Sheffield - Lakeville Corner - Douglas Harbour - Newcastle Creek - Minto
- Route 695 -- Springfield - Arcadia - Jemseg
- Route 705 -- Kars - Wickham - MacDonald Point - Belyeas Cove - Henderson Settlement
- Route 710 -- Hatfield Point - Henderson Settlement - Big Cove - Arcadia - Codys - Chambers Corner
- Route 715 -- Jemseg - Lower Cambridge - Arcadia - Coles Island
- Route 725 -- St. Stephen - Little Ridge - St. Croix River
- Route 730 -- Upper Little Ridge - Scotch Ridge - Basswood Ridge - DeWolfe
- Route 735 -- St. Stephen - Scotch Ridge - St. Croix River
- Route 740 -- St. Stephen - Basswood Ridge
- Route 745 -- Moores Mills - Oak Hill - Canoose - St. Croix River
- Route 750 -- Honeydale - Moores Mills - Maxwell Crossing - St. Stephen
- Route 755 -- Andersonville - Honeydale - Oak Bay
- Route 760 -- Simpson Corner - Waweig - Elmsville - Bethel (Route 1)
- Route 770 -- Route 127 - Rollingdam - Clarence Ridge - Bonny River - St. George
- Route 772 -- Deer Island
- Route 774 -- Campobello Island
- Route 776 -- Grand Manan Island
- Route 778 -- Pennfield - Beaver Harbour - Blacks Harbour
- Route 780 -- St. George - Utopia - Lepreau
- Route 785 -- Pennfield - Utopia - Mount Pleasant - Blissville
- Route 790 -- Lepreau - Dipper Harbour - Chance Harbour - Musquash
- Route 795 -- Lepreau - Wetmore Creek
- Route 820 -- Loch Lomond - Upham - Upperton (Route 111)
- Route 825 -- Loch Lomond - Garnett Settlement - Gardner Creek - Simonds
- Route 845 -- Kingston - Hampton
- Route 850 -- Kingston - Urquhart - Erbs Cove - Long Point - Keirsteadville - Springfield
- Route 855 -- Midland - Bloomfield
- Route 860 -- Saint John - Rothesay (Wells) - French Village - Titusville - Clover Hill
- Route 865 -- Valley Waters - Clover Hill - Hillsdale
- Route 870 -- Springfield - Belleisle Creek - Kierstead Mountain
- Route 875 -- Belleisle Creek - Searsville - Lower Millstream
- Route 880 -- Apohaqui - Berwick - Havelock
- Route 885 -- Three Rivers - Havelock - New Canaan
- Route 890 -- Sussex - Cornhill - Three Rivers
- Route 895 -- Anagance - Portage Vale - Goshen - Elgin - Little River - Coverdale
- Route 905 -- Three Rivers - Elgin
- Route 910 -- Coverdale - Caledonia Mountain - Hillsborough
- Route 915 -- Riverside-Albert - Cape Enrage - Alma
- Route 925 -- Dieppe - Dover - Memramcook
- Route 933 -- Memramcook - Haute-Aboujagane - Barachois
- Route 935 -- Dorchester - Johnson's Mills - Sackville
- Route 940 -- Sackville - Shemogue
- Route 945 -- Haute-Aboujagane - Beaubassin-Est - Cap-Pelé
- Route 950 -- Cap-Pelé - Petit-Cap - Shemogue
- Route 955 -- Mates Corner - Chapmans Corner - Cadman Corner - Murray Corner - Spence Settlement - Bayfield - Cape Tormentine
- Route 960 -- Strait Shores - Upper Cape - Cape Spear - Cape Tormentine
- Route 970 -- Strait Shores - Baie Verte - Route 366 (Nova Scotia)

== Other highways ==
The following roads are designated provincial highways by the New Brunswick Department of Transportation, but have no signed numerical designation:

- Deer Island Point Road - Route from Deer Island (New Brunswick) that connects Route 772 to Route 774 on Campobello Island via Cummings Cove to Welshpool Ferry and also from Deer Island (New Brunswick) New Brunswick Route 772 to Maine State Route 190 in Eastport, Maine via Cummings Cove to Eastport Ferry.
- Gunningsville Bridge and approaches, Moncton to Riverview (2.2 km)
- Palmer Brook Connector (1.6 km): Connector from Route 100 to Route 1 east of Quispamsis, and former alignment of Route 1.
- Prospect Street Extension, Fredericton (2.7 km): A former alignment of Route 2 from Hanwell Road (Route 640) to Woodstock Road (Route 102).
- Rue Principale, Tracadie-Sheila (7.4 km): A former alignment of Route 11.
- Vanier Boulevard, Bathurst (1.7 km): A continuation of Route 180 from Route 11 to St. Peter Boulevard (Route 134).
- Westmorland Street Bridge, Fredericton (1.6 km)
