= New Brunswick Route 11 =

Highway in New Brunswick

Route 11
- Route 11 highlighted in red

Route information
- Maintained by New Brunswick Department of Transportation
- Length: 440.4 km (273.7 mi)
- Existed: 1920s–present

Major junctions
- South end: Route 2 / Route 15 in Moncton
- Route 15 in Shediac; Route 8 / Route 117 in Miramichi; Route 8 in Bathurst; Route 17 near Glencoe
- North end: R-132 on the Matapédia Bridge at the Quebec border

Location
- Country: Canada
- Province: New Brunswick
- Major cities: Bouctouche, Richibucto, Miramichi, Tracadie–Sheila, Caraquet, Bathurst, Campbellton

Highway system
- Provincial highways in New Brunswick; Former routes
← Route 10	→ Route 15

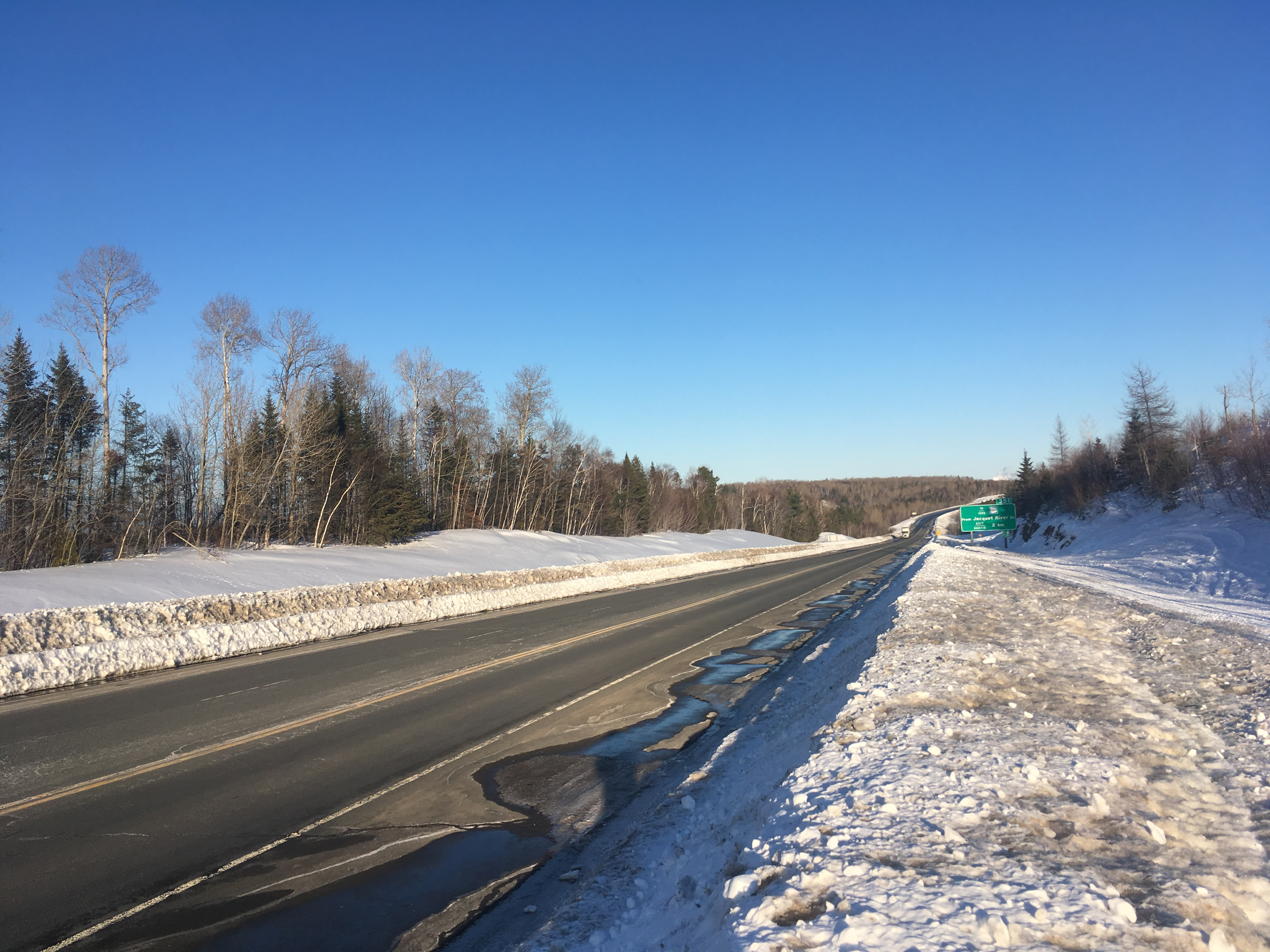
Route 11 in Jacquet River, approximately halfway between Bathurst and Campbellton

Route 11 is a provincial highway in northeastern New Brunswick, Canada. The 440-kilometre (270 mi) road runs from Moncton to the Quebec border, near Campbellton, at the Matapédia Bridge, following the province's eastern and northern coastlines.

Between Shediac Bridge and Miramichi, and between Bathurst and Campbellton, it is a two-lane road with some sections designed as a super two expressway. The highway is twinned for 7 kilometres in the Shediac region near the Route 15 interchange.

== Route description ==
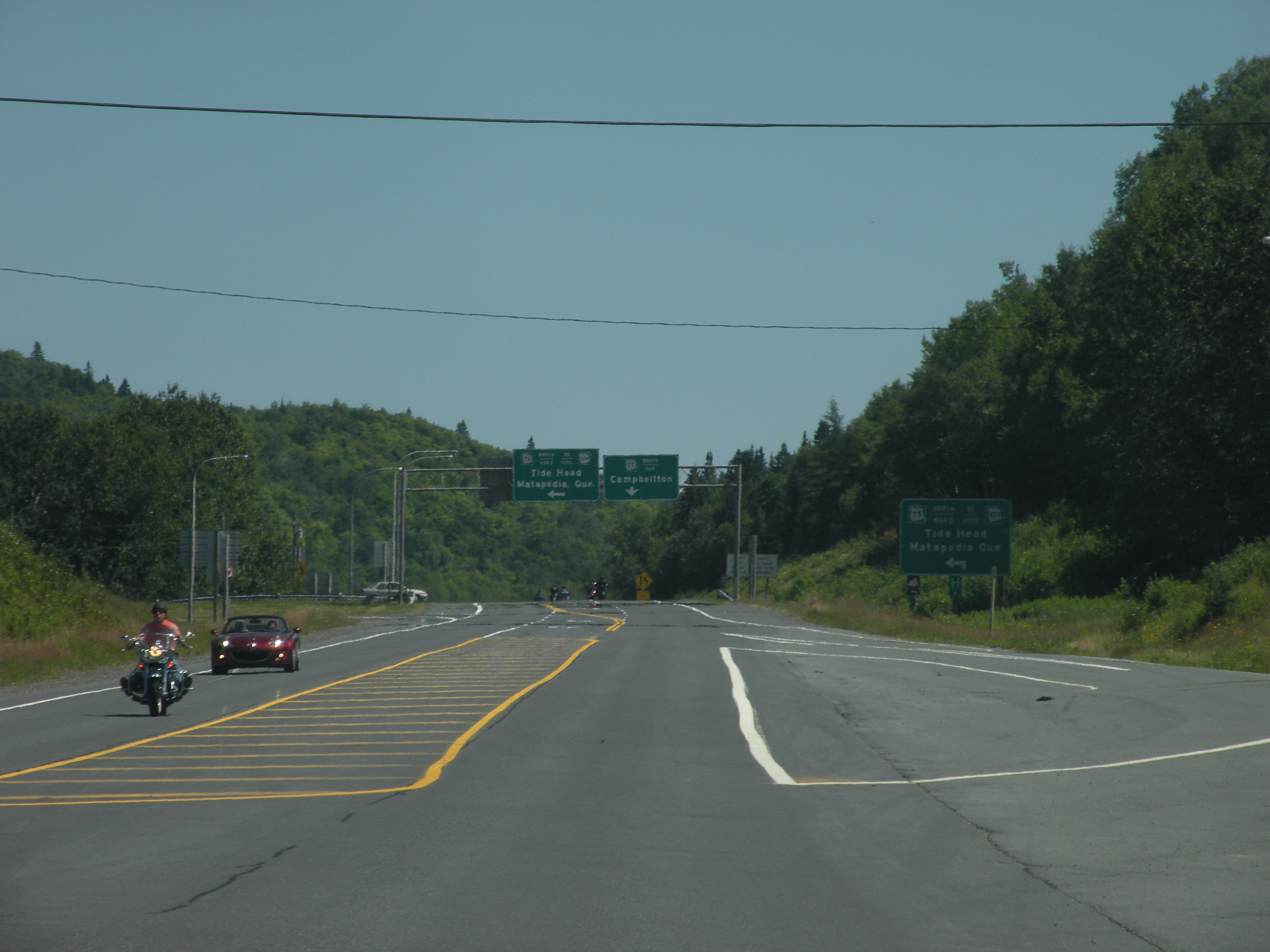
Route 11's intersection with Route 17, east of Glencoe.

The southern terminus of Route 11 is at an interchange with Route 2 in Moncton, where it begins a concurrency with Route 15 for 12 kilometres (7.5 mi) to Shediac. At Shediac, Route 11 departs Route 15 and turns northward, where its exit numbers are reset. It runs northward, parallel to Route 134 as a four-lane divided highway for 7 kilometres (4.3 mi), then becomes a super two controlled-access highway. The route passes through the communities of Shediac Cape, intersecting Route 134, and crosses the Shediac River. The highway then enters Cocagne by crossing the Cocagne River. Intersecting with Route 535, the route continues through Ward Corner passing McKees Mills and Saint-François-de-Kent at the intersection of Route 115. The route crosses the Little Bouctouche River, then the Bouctouche River as it enters Bouctouche.

From Bouctouche, Route 11 continues north to Richibucto as well as Kouchibouguac National Park. The highway reverts to a 2-lane uncontrolled access highway between the national park and the city of Miramichi to the northwest. The highway crosses the Miramichi River in the Miramichi borough of Chatham on the Centennial Bridge with Route 8.

Immediately after crossing the Miramichi River, Route 11 exits the right of way, leaving Route 8 alone on the super two. Route 11 continues on a 2-lane uncontrolled access highway northeast along the coast of Miramichi Bay and the Gulf of St. Lawrence as it runs around the perimeter of the Acadian Peninsula. Through this region, Route 11 typically forms the main street through most of the coastal towns and settlements such as Neguac, Caraquet, Bertrand, Grande-Anse, and Stonehaven. The only exception is a Super 2 controlled access bypass of the town of Tracadie-Sheila.

Route 11 has another interchange with Route 8 at Bathurst, where the latter terminates. Route 11 becomes a super two controlled-access highway from Bathurst, running northwest several kilometres inland from the coast of Chaleur Bay to Glencoe, west of the city of Campbellton. Near Glencoe, Route 11 intersects Route 17 and turns north onto a 2-lane local road toward Tide Head. The highway turns west to follow the Restigouche River and terminates at the Matapédia Bridge, which crosses the river and connects to Quebec Route 132 in Matapédia, Quebec.

== History ==
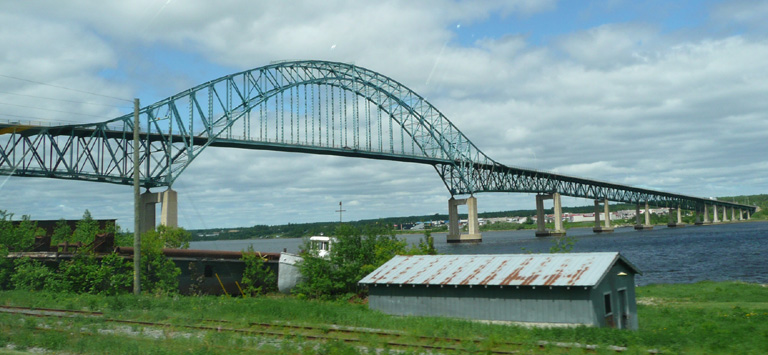
Centennial Bridge carries Route 11 over the Miramichi River.

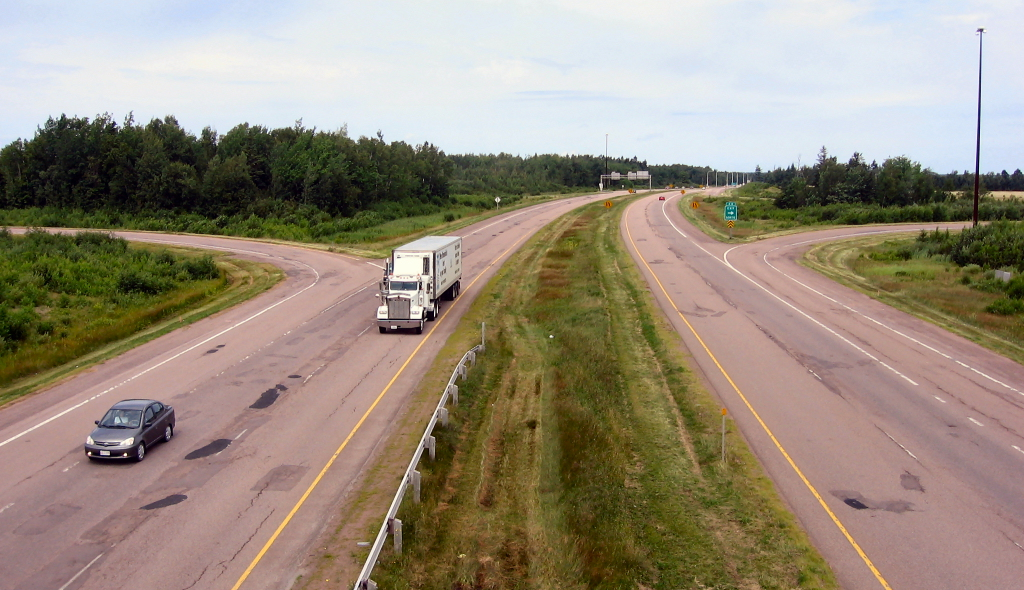
Divided section of Route 11 outside Shediac.

Since the late 1960s, Route 11 has received several upgrades and re-designations as it progresses towards becoming an expressway.

The most significant upgrade to the entire highway route along the east coast of New Brunswick was the opening of the Centennial Bridge which replaced a ferry service and bypassed the town of Chatham in 1967.

In 1973 a new 4-lane expressway opened between Moncton and Shediac, which was then referred to as the Shediac Four-Lane Highway or Shediac Expressway (it was subsequently numbered Route 15 and is known as the Veterans Memorial Highway). Prior to this new expressway, Route 11 followed the Shediac Road from Shediac to Moncton, terminating at Route 2, the Trans-Canada Highway in Lakeville. Route 11's southern terminus was then changed to the current interchange at Route 15 in Shediac.

Controlled access Super 2 expressway sections on Route 11 were completed during the 1970s in Bathurst and the Campbellton-Dalhousie area, as well as between Shediac and Bouctouche.

During the 1980s and into the early 1990s, two long stretches of Super 2 expressway were completed on Route 11; one running from Bouctouche to Kouchibouguac National Park (bypassing Richibucto), and another running between Bathurst and Charlo, where the existing Super 2 section running east from Campbellton ended. The Super 2 section in Bathurst was also extended eastward past Salmon Beach at the city's east end.

A bypass of Tracadie-Sheila opened to traffic in 2003. Also, an extension to that existing bypass was done in 2009, linking the northern end and Six-Roads, near Pokemouche.

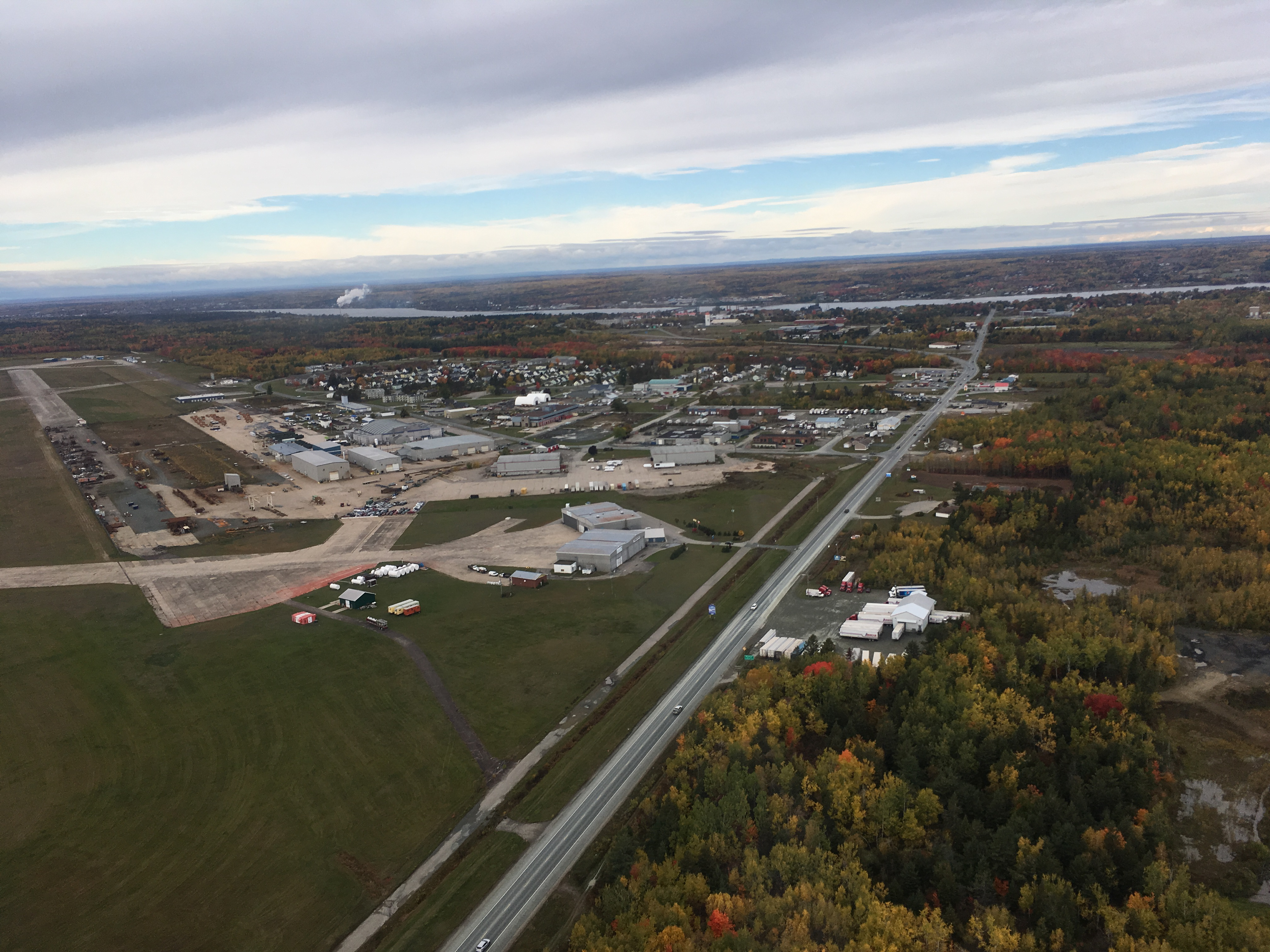
Route 11 in Miramichi

A bypass of Caraquet opened to traffic in 2016. Also going south from exiting Route 11 from Portage Road to Bertrand. The 13 km construction started in 2013, then finished in 2016.

In 2017, work was completed on a new interchange between Route 11 and 15 in Shediac, and 7 kilometres of twinned highway.

Currently, two other sections of highway are being twinned. The first is from the south side of the Shediac River to the Cocagne River, and the second from the north side of the Cocagne River to the Little Bouctouche River, meaning the highway will revert to two lanes across the Cocagne River on the current bridge.

== Cultural significance ==
Music and popular culture

New Brunswick Route 11 holds cultural significance within Acadian communities of northeastern New Brunswick. The highway is referenced in the French-language Acadian song « Highway 11 » by the local group Tradition, where Route 11 is portrayed as a symbolic “road home.” The song reflects the importance of Route 11 in connecting Acadian coastal communities and expresses themes of return, memory, and regional identity.

== Major intersections ==
County	Location	km	mi	Exit	Destinations	Notes
Westmorland	Moncton; Dieppe	0.0	0.0	—	Route 15 west – Dieppe, Moncton, Roméo LeBlanc International Airport	Route 11 southern terminus; south end of Route 15 concurrency; exit numbers follow Route 15
Westmorland	Moncton; Dieppe	0.0	0.0	19	Route 2 (TCH) – Sackville, Nova Scotia, Saint John, Fredericton	Signed as exits 19A (east) and 19B (west); Route 2 exit 467
Westmorland	Scoudouc	7.3	4.5	26	Industrial Drive	
Westmorland	Shediac	11.6	7.2	(0)	Route 15 east – Strait Shores, Prince Edward Island	Eastbound exit and westbound entrance; north end of Route 15 concurrency
Westmorland	Shediac	12.5	7.8	1	To Route 132 / Route 133 / Route 15 east – Shediac, Scoudouc	Westbound Route 15 access (via exit 31) to Route 11
Westmorland		14.0	8.7	2	Route 134 – Lakeville, Westmorland County, Shediac Cape	
Westmorland	Shediac Bridge	18.4	11.4	Crosses the Shediac River		
Westmorland	Shediac Bridge	19.4	12.1	7	To Route 134 / Route 530 – Shediac Bridge, Grande-Digue	
Kent	Cocagne	25.7	16.0	13	To Route 134 / Route 530 / Cocagne Sud Road	Southbound exit and entrance, full interchange proposed
Kent	Cocagne	26.0– 26.5	16.2– 16.5	Crosses the Cocagne River		
Kent	Cocagne	27.2	16.9	15	Route 535 to Route 134 – Cocagne, Notre-Dame, Champdoré	
Kent		38.8	24.1	27	Route 115 to Route 134 / Route 535 – McKees Mills, Saint-Thomas	
Kent		39.5	24.5	Crosses the Little Bouctouche River		
Kent	Bouctouche	40.2	25.0	29	Sheridan Road	
Kent	Bouctouche	43.6	27.1	Crosses the Bouctouche River		
Kent	Bouctouche	44.1	27.4	32	Route 515 (Irving Boulevard) to Route 135 – Bouctouche, Sainte-Marie	Signed as exits 32A (east) and 32B (west)
Kent		47.2	29.3	36	Route 135 – Saint-Maurice, MacIntosh Hill	
Kent	Sainte-Anne-de-Kent	53.1	33.0	42	To Route 134 / Route 475 / Route 505 – Sainte-Anne, South Branch	
Kent	Five Rivers	64.1	39.8	53	Route 134 to Route 116 / Route 505 – Five Rivers, Richibouctou-Village, Elsipogtog First Nation	
Kent	Five Rivers	66.6– 67.2	41.4– 41.8	Crosses the Richibucto River		
Kent	Richibucto	67.9	42.2	57	Route 134 – Richibucto, Five Rivers	
Kent	Saint-Charles	74.7	46.4	64	Saint-Charles, Aidouane	
Kent	Saint-Louis-de-Kent	80.0	49.7	69	Saint-Louis, Saint-Ignace	
Kent	Saint-Louis-de-Kent	80.7	50.1	Crosses the Kouchibouguacis River		
Kent		85.7	53.3	75	Route 117 north / Route 480 west – Acadieville, Kouchibouguac National Park, Pointe-Sapin	
Kent				North end of freeway		
Kent	Kouchibouguac	88.4	54.9		Route 134 south – Saint-Louis-de-Kent	
Northumberland	St. Margarets	106.9	66.4		Route 440 west – Nouvelle-Arcadie	
Northumberland	Black River	118.8	73.8		To Route 117 / South Black River Road – Baie-Sainte-Anne	
Northumberland	Miramichi	130.1	80.8		King Street	
Northumberland	Miramichi	130.1	80.8	South end of freeway		
Northumberland	Miramichi	131.1	81.5	119	Route 8 south – Miramichi Airport, Fredericton; Route 117 south (University Avenue) to Route 128	South end of Route 8 concurrency
Northumberland	Miramichi	132.3	82.2	120	Church Street	
Northumberland	Miramichi	132.4– 133.5	82.3– 83.0	Centennial Bridge crosses the Miramichi River		
Northumberland	Miramichi	133.6	83.0	179	King George Highway Route 8 north – Bathurst	North end of Route 8 concurrency
Northumberland	Miramichi	133.6	83.0	North end of freeway		
Northumberland	Bartibog Bridge	150.0	93.2	Crosses the Bartibog River		
Northumberland	Village-Saint-Laurent	166.7	103.6		Route 450 north – Lagacéville	
Northumberland	Neguac	174.7	108.6		Route 455 east (Fairisle Street)	
Northumberland	Neguac	176.9	109.9		Route 460 north (Stymiest Street)	
Northumberland	Tabusintac	183.5	114.0		Route 455 east (Fairisle Street)	
Northumberland	Tabusintac	185.5	115.3	Crosses the Tabusintac River		
Northumberland		186.8	116.1		Route 460 south	
Northumberland	Rivière-du-Portage	197.1	122.5		Route 370 north (Rivière-du-Portage Road)	
Gloucester	Tracadie-Sheila	203.1– 203.5	126.2– 126.4	Crosses the Big Tracadie River		
Gloucester	Tracadie-Sheila			South end of freeway		
Gloucester	Tracadie-Sheila	204.3	126.9	192	Route 370 (Pointe-des-Feruson Road) – Point-Lafrance	
Gloucester	Tracadie-Sheila	205.7	127.8	194	Principale Street	
Gloucester	Tracadie-Sheila	208.5	129.6	198	Riviere-a-la-Truite Street	
Gloucester	Tracadie-Sheila	210.4– 210.8	130.7– 131.0	Crosses the Little Tracadie River		
Gloucester	Tracadie-Sheila	213.4	132.6	203	Route 150 north (Principale Street) to Route 160 – Hautes-Terres	
Gloucester	Tracadie-Sheila			North end of freeway		
Gloucester	Six Roads	220.8	137.2		Route 150 south / Petit Carey Road	
Gloucester	Six Roads	222.1	138.0		Route 355 north – Sainte-Rose	
Gloucester	Pokemouche	227.6	141.4	Crosses the Pokemouche River		
Gloucester	Pokemouche	228.3	141.9	217	Route 113 north – Shippagan, Lameque; Route 350 west – Hautes-Terres	At-grade
Gloucester		231.7	144.0		Route 345 east to Route 335 – Evangeline, Saint-Simon	
Gloucester	Caraquet	239.0	148.5		To Route 145 / Rue du Portage – Bas-Caraquet, Caraquet	South end of Caraquet Bypass
Gloucester	Caraquet	244.2	151.7	234	To Route 145 / Alexis Road – Caraquet	Interchange
Gloucester	Bertrand	251.9	156.5		Route 145 north – Caraquet; Route 325 south – Hautes-Terres	Roundabout; north end of Caraquet Bypass
Gloucester		257.6	160.1		Route 303 east – Maisonnette	
Gloucester		261.1	162.2		Route 320 east – Anse-Bleue	
Gloucester	Grande-Anse	265.2	164.8		Route 330 south – Saint-Leolin	
Gloucester	Pokeshaw	272.1	169.1		Route 135 south – Hautes-Terres, Saint-Leolin	
Gloucester	Janeville	290.3	180.4		Route 340 south – Notre-Dame-des-Érables	
Gloucester				South end of freeway		
Gloucester	Bathurst	310.1	192.7	300	Route 134 (Miramichi Avenue) – Allardville	Signed as exits 300A (north) and 300B (south)
Gloucester	Bathurst	310.5– 311.4	192.9– 193.5	301	Route 8 south – Miramichi	Route 8 northern terminus
Gloucester	Bathurst	312.9	194.4	Crosses the Nepisiguit River		
Gloucester	Bathurst	313.3	194.7	304	Route 430 (King Avenue)	
Gloucester	Bathurst	318.5	197.9	308	St-Anne Street	
Gloucester	Bathurst	320.0	198.8	310	Route 180 (Vanier Boulevard) to Route 134 – Bathurst Airport, South Tetagouche	
Gloucester	Bathurst	320.9	199.4	311	Route 315 (Sunset Drive) – North Tetagouche	
Gloucester	Beresford	328.0	203.8	318	To Route 134 – Beresford, Robertville	
Gloucester	Nigadoo	331.2	205.8	321	To Route 134 / Route 315 – Nigadoo, Nicholas-Denys	
Gloucester	LaPlante	336.0	208.8	326	Route 315 to Route 134 – LaPlante, Petit-Rocher	
Gloucester		342.5	212.8	333	To Route 134 – Madran, Pointe-Verte	
Gloucester	Belledune	349.4	217.1	344	To Route 134 / Turgeon Road – Belledune	
Restigouche	Belledune	360.4	223.9	351	To Route 134 / Jacquet River Drive	
Restigouche	Nash Creek	366.9	228.0	357	To Route 134 – Nash Creek, Lorne	
Restigouche	Charlo	385.3	239.4	375	To Route 134 – Charlo	
Restigouche	Charlo	389.6	242.1	385	To Route 134 – Charlo, Charlo Airport, Balmoral	
Restigouche		392.2	243.7	388	Route 280 to Route 134 – Eel River Crossing	
Restigouche	Dalhousie	395.9	246.0	391	Route 275 to Route 134 – Dalhousie, Eel River Bar, Eel River Crossing	
Restigouche	Dalhousie Junction	401.5	249.5	397	To Route 134 – Dalhousie Junction, Point La Nim	
Restigouche		407.4	253.1	403	Route 280 to Route 134 – Dundee, McLeods	
Restigouche	Campbellton	416.4	258.7	412	To Route 134 / R-132 – Campbellton, Pointe-à-la-Croix, QC	
Restigouche	Atholville	419.4	260.6	415	To Route 134 – Atholville, Campbellton	Former Route 270
Restigouche	Glencoe			North end of freeway		
Restigouche	Glencoe	426.9	265.3		Route 17 south – Saint-Leonard	Route 17 northern terminus
Restigouche	Tide Head	430.1	267.3		Route 134 south – Atholville	Route 134 northern terminus
New Brunswick–Quebec border		440.4– 441.4	273.7– 274.3	Matapédia Bridge crosses the Restigouche River		
Gaspésie–Îles-de-la-Madeleine (Quebec)	Matapédia	441.5	274.3		R-132 – Amqui, Matapédia, Gaspe, Pointe-à-la-Croix	T-intersection
1.000 mi = 1.609 km; 1.000 km = 0.621 mi: Concurrency terminus; Incomplete access; Route transition

== See also ==
- List of New Brunswick provincial highways
