= New Brunswick Route 134 =

Highway in New Brunswick

Route 134

Route information
- Maintained by New Brunswick Department of Transportation
- Length: 260.7 km (162.0 mi)
- Existed: 1972–present

Southern section
- Length: 102.8 km (63.9 mi)
- South end: Route 106 in Moncton
- Major intersections: Route 15 in Moncton; Route 2 in Moncton; Route 11 near Shediac
- North end: Route 11 at Kouchibouguac

Northern section
- Length: 157.9 km (98.1 mi)
- South end: Route 8 near Allardville
- North end: Route 11 in Tide Head

Location
- Country: Canada
- Province: New Brunswick
- Major cities: Moncton, Shediac, Bouctouche, Five Rivers, Richibucto, Saint-Louis-de-Kent, Bathurst, Miramichi, Belledune, Dalhousie, Campbellton

Highway system
- Provincial highways in New Brunswick; Former routes
← Route 133	→ Route 135

Route 134 is a 261 km (162 mi)-long north–south secondary highway in eastern New Brunswick, Canada. The highway is divided into a northern and southern section by a gap in Northumberland County connected by Route 11 and Route 8.

== History ==
Route 134, for the most part, consists of former routings of Route 8 and Route 11. It was first designated in 1972 with the opening of the Shediac four-lane highway between Moncton and Shediac (now part of Route 15). Different sections of Route 134 continued to appear between the mid-1970s and the early 1990s as construction continued of new controlled-access alignments of Route 8 and Route 11.

As Route 11 between Kouchibouguac and Miramichi, and a stretch of Route 8 south of Allardville have never been upgraded, Route 134 remains a "broken" route.

A third segment of Route 134 appeared briefly on maps in the early 1990s along Oldfield Road north of Miramichi (after a new alignment of Route 8 was constructed), whether it was signed or officially part of the route is uncertain.

Route 134 was rerouted in a portion of Belledune in 1996 after the footprint of a new power plant took over a section of the route's former alignment.

== Route ==
=== Moncton ===
The route's southern terminus begins at the intersection of Route 106 in Moncton (Main St) where the route is called Botsford St. The route travels north crossing Route 126 (Mountain Rd), then Route 15 (Wheeler Blvd). Now known as Lewisville Road, the route crosses Humphrey Brook, passing the southern terminus of Route 115, turning north east and is known as Shediac Rd. Continuing out of the city crossing under Route 2 as it exits the city passing through Lakeville north east.

=== Rural Westmorland County ===
The route continues north-east passing through the community of Shediac Cape in Westmorland County, crossing Route 11 where it takes a sharp turn north at the northern terminus of Route 133.

=== Kent County ===
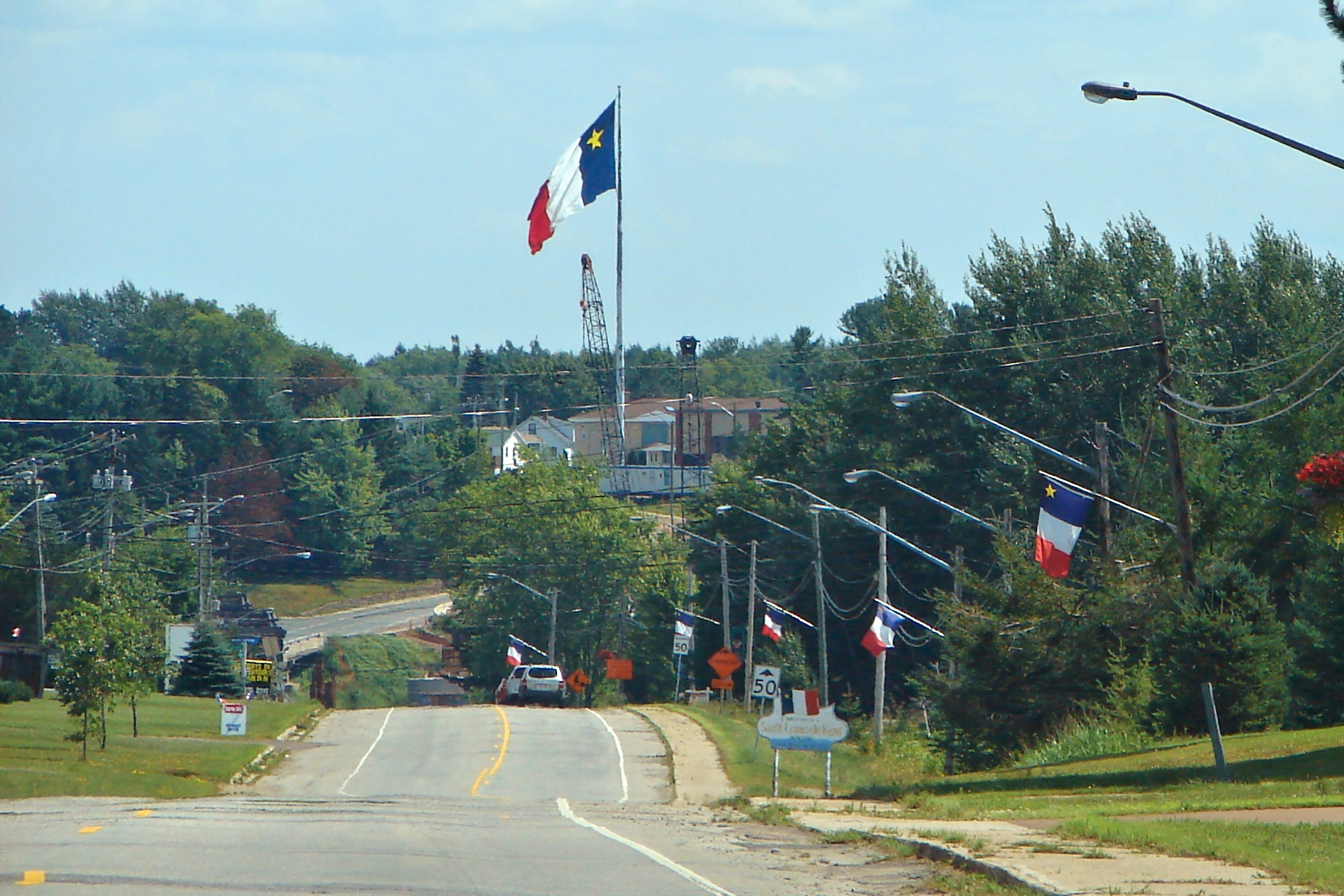
Route 134 at Saint-Louis-de-Kent

=== Gloucester County ===
As Route 134 enters Gloucester County, it is concurrent with Route 8. After a few kilometres, it splits away and heads NNW to Allardville. After passing through Allardville, intersecting Route 160, it continues for about 25 km heading NNW for Bathurst. After passing through Bathurst and serving as the eastern terminus of Route 180, it goes up the SW coast of Chaleur Bay for about 30 km before hopping into Restigouche County near Belledune.

=== Restigouche County ===
In Restigouche County, it continues to run along the Bay of Chaleur. Upon entering from the south, Route 134 follows a short alignment, built around a power plant in Belledune. North of it, the road continues along the coast, running through the communities of Jacquet River, Nash Creek, and New Mills among others, before reaching the Village of Charlo. In the northern part of the village, there is a beach which the route travels through, along the mouth of the Eel River. On the other side of the Eel River, is Eel River Bar First Nation. The road then proceeds through downtown Dalhousie, along Renfrew, William, and George Street's. After a right turn, Route 134 heads west for Campbellton. In the 20 km between the two municipalities, the posted speed limit varies from 60 – 80 km/h. Upon entering Campbellton, the speed limit is reduced to 50 km/h, and a sidewalk appears. The road takes a route through downtown Campbellton, following Ramsay, Water, Andrew, and Roseberry Street's. West of Campbellton are Atholville and Tide Head. Through the villages, it becomes a truck route, linking highways to local industry. At the intersection with Route 11 in Tide Head, Route 134 reaches its northern terminus.

== Communities along Route 134 ==
- Grande-Digue
- Cocagne
- Breau-Village
- Despres-Village
- Ward Corner
- Bouctouche
- McIntosh Hill
- Collette-Village
- Sainte-Anne-de-Kent
- Galloway
- Five Rivers
- Richibucto
- Aldouane
- Portage St-Louis
- St-Louis-de-Kent
- Saint-Louis
- Kouchibouguac
- Daulnay
- Allardville
- Goodwin Mill
- Poirier Subdivision
- Bathurst
- Beresford
- Nigadoo
- Petit-Rocher
- Pointe-Verte
- Belledune
- Nash Creek
- Black Point
- Seaside
- New Mills
- Charlo
- Eel River Bar
- Dalhousie
- Point La Nim
- Dalhousie Junction
- McLeods
- Campbellton
- Atholville
- Tide Head

== Major intersections ==
County	Location	km	mi	Destinations	Notes
Westmorland	Moncton	0.0	0.0	Main Street (Route 106)	Southern terminus; follows Botsford Street
Westmorland	Moncton	0.7	0.43	Mountain Road (Route 126)	
Westmorland	Moncton	1.1	0.68	Wheeler Boulevard (Route 15)	Becomes Lewisville Road
Westmorland	Moncton	1.5	0.93	Elmwood Drive (Route 115 north)	
Westmorland	Moncton	2.2	1.4	Paul Street	Located 200 m (660 ft) from Route 15; Route 134 turns onto Shediac Road
Westmorland	Moncton	8.0	5.0	Route 2 (TCH) – Sackville, Saint John, Fredericton	Route 2 exit 465
Westmorland		23.0	14.3	Route 11 – Moncton, Miramichi	Route 11 exit 2
Westmorland	Shediac Cape	24.0	14.9	Route 133 east – Shediac	
Westmorland	Shediac Bridge-Shediac River	28.7	17.8	Crosses the Shediac River	
Kent	Shediac Bridge-Shediac River	29.8	18.5	Route 530 north – Grande-Digue, Caissie Cape	
Kent	Cocagne	35.9	22.3	Route 530 south – Grande-Digue, Cap-de-Cocagne	
Kent	Cocagne	36.6	22.7	Crosses the Cocagne River	
Kent	Cocagne	37.0	23.0	Route 535 south – Notre-Dame	
Kent	Saint-François-de-Kent	50.3	31.3	Route 115 south – McKees Mills	
Kent	Saint-François-de-Kent	51.2	31.8	Route 535 south – Saint-Thomas	
Kent	Bouctouche	51.5	32.0	Crosses the Little Bouctouche River	
Kent	Bouctouche	54.3	33.7	Crosses the Bouctouche River	
Kent	Bouctouche	54.5	33.9	Route 515 west (Irving Boulevard) – Sainte-Marie	
Kent	Bouctouche	54.7	34.0	Route 475 north – Baie de Bouctouche	
Kent		58.6	36.4	Route 11 – Moncton, Miramichi	Route 11 exit 36
Kent	Sainte-Anne-de-Kent	65.2	40.5	Route 505 north to Route 475 – Cap-Lumiere, Saint-Édouard-de-Kent	
Kent		76.3	47.4	Route 11 – Moncton, Miramichi	Route 11 exit 53
Kent	Five Rivers	77.9	48.4	Route 495 south / Route 505 east – South Branch, Richibouctou-Village, Cap-Lumiere	
Kent	Five Rivers	78.7	48.9	Crosses the Richibucto River	
Kent	Five Rivers	79.0	49.1	Route 116 west – Elsipogtog First Nation, Harcourt	
Kent	Richibucto	81.4	50.6	Route 11 – Moncton, Miramichi	Route 11 exit 57
Kent	Aldouane	87.6	54.4	Crosses the Little Aldouane River	
Kent	Aldouane	90.1	56.0	Crosses the Saint-Charles River	
Kent	Saint-Louis-de-Kent	95.2	59.2	Crosses the Kouchibouguacis River	
Kent		99.6	61.9	Route 117 to Route 480 west – Acadieville, Kouchibouguac National Park, Pointe-Sapin	
Kent	Kouchibouguac	102.8	63.9	Route 11 – Moncton, Miramichi	
82.8 km (51.4 mi) gap in Route 134
Gloucester	Jeanne-Mance	185.6	115.3	Route 8 – Miramichi, Bathurst	
Gloucester	Allardville	199.7	124.1	Route 160 to Route 360 west – Tracadie-Sheila, Brunswick Mines	
Gloucester	Bathurst	298.5	185.5	Route 11 to Route 8 – Caraquet, Campbellton, Miramichi	Route 11 exit 300
Gloucester	Bathurst	219.3	136.3	Crosses the Nepisiguit River	
Gloucester	Bathurst	220.0	136.7	Route 430 south (Dumaresq Street)	
Gloucester	Bathurst	223.5	138.9	Crosses the Bathurst Basin	
Gloucester	Bathurst	224.4	139.4	Route 180 west (Vanier Boulevard) – South Tetagouche	
Gloucester	Bathurst	225.1	139.9	Crosses the Tetagouche River	
Gloucester	Beresford	232.1	144.2	Crosses the Millstream River	
Gloucester	Nigadoo	236.7	147.1	Crosses the Nigadoo River	
Gloucester	Petit-Rocher	240.7	149.6	Route 315 west – LaPlante	
Gloucester	Petit-Rocher	225.1	139.9	Crosses the Elmtree River	
Restigouche	Belledune	274.2	170.4	Crosses the Jacquet River	
Restigouche	Benjamin River	286.8	178.2	Crosses the Benjamin River	
Restigouche	Eel River Cove	303.2	188.4	Route 280 west – Eel River Crossing	
Restigouche	Eel River Bar	304.8	189.4	Crosses the Eel River	
Restigouche	Dalhousie	307.2	190.9	Route 275 south – Eel River Crossing	
Restigouche	McLeods	324.7	201.8	Route 280 south – Dundee	
Restigouche	Campbellton	334.0	207.5	To R-132 / Salmon Boulevard – Pointe-à-la-Croix	
Restigouche	Campbellton	335.2	208.3	To R-132 / Subway Street – Pointe-à-la-Croix	
Restigouche	Atholville	337.8	209.9	Beauvista Drive	Former Route 270
Restigouche	Tide Head	343.5	213.4	Route 11 to Route 17 – Saint-Léonard, Matapédia	Northern terminus
1.000 mi = 1.609 km; 1.000 km = 0.621 mi

== See also ==
- List of New Brunswick provincial highways
