= New Brunswick Route 450 =

Highway in New Brunswick, Canada

Coordinates: 47.274687°N 65.289516°W

Route 450

Route information
- Maintained by New Brunswick Department of Transportation
- Length: 22 km (14 mi)

Major junctions
- West end: Route 8 / Route 134 west of Lavilette
- East end: Route 11 in Village-Saint-Laurent

Location
- Country: Canada
- Province: New Brunswick

Highway system
- Provincial highways in New Brunswick; Former routes
← Route 445	→ Route 455

Route 450 is a 22-kilometre (14 mi) long mostly west–east secondary highway in the northwest portion of New Brunswick, Canada.

The route's western terminus starts at the merged highways Route 134 and Route 8 west of the community of Lavillette. travels east through the community of Lavillette before taking a 45 degree turn north. The road then takes a 90 degree turn East at the intersection of Route 455 travelling through the community of Saint-Wilfred before turning south passing by Drisdelle Settlement before entering the community of Lagaceville. The road briefly turns east before the intersection of Route 445 before its last stretch south to the community of Village-Saint-Laurent at the intersection of Route 11.
