= New Brunswick Route 445 =

Highway in New Brunswick, Canada

Coordinates: 47.291572°N 65.113049°W

Route 445

Route information
- Maintained by New Brunswick Department of Transportation

Major junctions
- West end: Route 450 in Lagaceville
- East end: Route 11 in Covedell

Location
- Country: Canada
- Province: New Brunswick

Highway system
- Provincial highways in New Brunswick; Former routes
← Route 440	→ Route 450

Route 445 is a 11-kilometre (6.8 mi) long mostly West–East secondary highway in the northwest portion of New Brunswick, Canada.

The route's western terminus starts at a 90 degree turn of Route 450 in the community of Lagaceville. The Road begins traveling north-east through a mostly treed area passing over a brook and briefly merging with Route 455 at Caissie Road until Fairisle where it separates. The road continues until the community of Stymiest Road where it briefly merges with Route 460. The road lastly ends in the community of Covedell at Route 11.
