= New Brunswick Route 150 =

Highway in New Brunswick, Canada

Route 150

Route information
- Maintained by New Brunswick Department of Transportation

Major junctions
- South end: Route 11 in Tracadie
- Route 160 in Losier Settlement
- North end: Route 11 in Six Roads

Location
- Country: Canada
- Province: New Brunswick

Highway system
- Provincial highways in New Brunswick; Former routes
← Route 148	→ Route 160

Route 150 is a 5-kilometre (3.1 mi)-long north–south secondary highway in the northeast New Brunswick, Canada. The highway starts at Route 11 (exit 203) as a continuation of Principale Street from Tracadie. Route 150 parallels Route 11 northward and passes through Sainte-Rose and Losier Settlement before its terminus near Six Roads. Route 150 is a former alignment of Route 11, resulting from an extension of the Tracadie-Sheila Bypass.
