= New Brunswick Route 315 =

Highway in New Brunswick, Canada

Route 315

Route information
- Maintained by New Brunswick Department of Transportation
- Length: 20 km (12 mi)

Major junctions
- South end: Route 180 in Bathurst
- Route 11 in Bathurst; Route 322 in Sainte-Anne & Nigadoo; Route 11 in LaPlante
- North end: Route 134 in Petit-Rocher

Location
- Country: Canada
- Province: New Brunswick
- Counties: Gloucester

Highway system
- Provincial highways in New Brunswick; Former routes
← Route 313	→ Route 320

Route 315 is a 20 km (12 mi) local highway in northwestern New Brunswick, Canada. The road runs from New Brunswick Route 180 in Bathurst to its northern terminus at New Brunswick Route 134 in Petit-Rocher, its route running mostly parallel to the west with New Brunswick Route 11.

== Communities along Route 315 ==
- Bathurst
- Dunlop
- Nigadoo
- LaPlante
- Petit-Rocher

== See also ==
- List of New Brunswick provincial highways
