= Beausoleil, New Brunswick =

Beausoleil
- Rural community
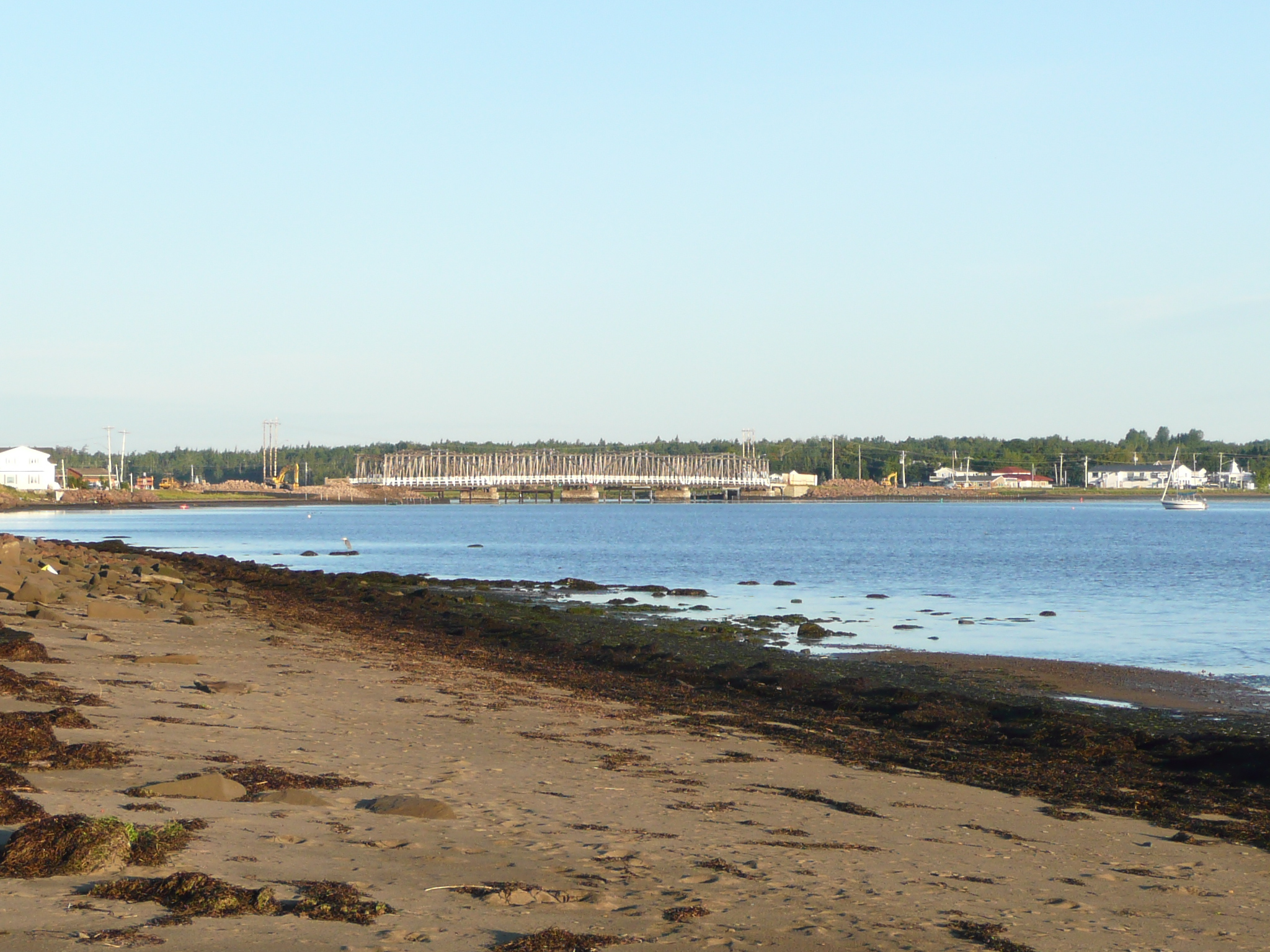

- Location within New Brunswick
- Coordinates: 46°20′26″N 64°37′12″W
- Country: Canada
- Province: New Brunswick
- County: Kent County
- Regional service commission: Kent
- Incorporated: January 1, 2023

Government
  - Type: Rural community council
  - Mayor: Roméo J. Bourque
  - MP: Dominic LeBlanc (L)
  - Provincial Representative: Benoît Bourque (L)
- Time zone: UTC-4 (AST)
  - Summer (DST): UTC-3 (ADT)

Beausoleil is a rural community in the Canadian province of New Brunswick. It was formed through the 2023 New Brunswick local governance reforms. It encompasses the communities of Cocagne, Grande-Digue, Notre-Dame, Shediac Bridge, Shediac River.

== History ==
Beausoleil was incorporated on January 1, 2023.

== Geography ==
The community is located around the mouth of the Cocagne River in Cocagne Bay at the crossroads of Route 535 and Route 134. Beausoleil is also located around the mouth of the Shediac River in Shediac Bay at the crossroads of Route 530 and Route 134.

== Education ==
- École Blanche-Bourgeois
- École Notre-Dame
- École Grande-Digue

== Notable people ==
- Auguste Théophile Léger (1852-1923) - New Brunswick politician
- Alfred Edmond Bourgeois (1872-1939) - New Brunswick politician, clerk, landlord and merchant.
- Allison Dysart (1880-1962) - New Brunswick politician, lawyer and judge
- Louis-Prudent-Alexandre Robichaud (1890-1971) - New Brunswick political figure and jurist.
- Michel Cormier (b. 1957) - Canadian journalist, lecturer and author.

== See also ==
- List of communities in New Brunswick
- List of municipalities in New Brunswick
- Joseph Beausoleil Broussard
