= New Brunswick Route 455 =

Highway in New Brunswick, Canada

Coordinates: 47.303913°N 65.197678°W

Route 455

Route information
- Maintained by New Brunswick Department of Transportation

Major junctions
- West end: Route 450 west of Allainville
- East end: Route 11 in Neguac

Location
- Country: Canada
- Province: New Brunswick

Highway system
- Provincial highways in New Brunswick; Former routes
← Route 450	→ Route 460

Route 455 is a 13-kilometre (8.1 mi) long mostly West–East secondary highway in the northwest portion of New Brunswick, Canada.

The route's western terminus starts west of Allainville at a 90 degree turn on Route 450. The road travels east through the community of Allainville then Lauvergot before briefly merging with Route 445 in Fairisle south to Caissie Road. From there the road again continues south east entering the community of Neguac at Route 11.
