= New Brunswick Route 365 =

Highway in New Brunswick, Canada

Route 365

Route information
- Maintained by New Brunswick Department of Transportation

Major junctions
- East end: Route 160 in Hautes-Terres
- West end: Route 135 in Tracadie-Sheila

Location
- Country: Canada
- Province: New Brunswick
- Major cities: Tilley Road, Gauvreau, Little Tracadie

Highway system
- Provincial highways in New Brunswick; Former routes
← Route 363	→ Route 370

Route 365 is a 14-kilometre (8.7 mi) long east–west secondary highway in the northeast portion of New Brunswick, Canada.

The route's eastern terminus is in the town of Hautes-Terres. The road starts off traveling south to the community of Tilley Road. Here the road takes a 90 degree turn east to the community of Gauvreau. The road then follows the Tracadie River, crossing the river twice before entering the community of Little Tracadie. The road crosses Route 11 before ending in the town of Tracadie-Sheila.

== Intersecting routes ==
- Route 11
