= New Brunswick Route 440 =

Highway in New Brunswick, Canada

Coordinates: 46.817918°N 65.323334°W

Route 440

Route information
- Maintained by New Brunswick Department of Transportation
- Length: 29 km (18 mi)

Major junctions
- North end: Route 11 / Route 134 in St. Margarets
- South end: Route 126 in Nouvelle-Arcadie

Location
- Country: Canada
- Province: New Brunswick

Highway system
- Provincial highways in New Brunswick; Former routes
← Route 435	→ Route 445

Route 440 is a 29-kilometre (18 mi) long mostly North–South secondary highway in the northwest portion of New Brunswick, Canada.

The route's Northern terminus starts at the intersection of Route 134 and Route 11 in the community of St. Margarets. The Road begins traveling south-west through a mostly treed area passing through the community of Wine River, Rosaireville and finally Shediac Ridge before entering the village of Nouvelle-Arcadie as the road Rue des Erables ending at Route 126.

== Intersecting routes ==
- None
