= New Brunswick Route 355 =

Highway in New Brunswick, Canada

Route 355

Route information
- Maintained by New Brunswick Department of Transportation
- Length: 17.3 km (10.7 mi)

Major junctions
- East end: Route 135 in Bois-Blanc
- West end: Route 11 in Six-Roads

Location
- Country: Canada
- Province: New Brunswick
- Major cities: Sainte-Rose

Highway system
- Provincial highways in New Brunswick; Former routes
← Route 350	→ Route 360

Route 355 is a 17.3-kilometre (10.7 mi) long east–west secondary highway in the northeast portion of New Brunswick, Canada.

The route's eastern terminus is in the community of Bois-Blanc. The road travels east to the community of Haut-Sainte-Rose. The route then continues to the community of Sainte-Rose before continuing to Sainte-Rose-Gloucester. The routes ends in the community of Six-Roads at Route 113.

== Intersecting routes ==
- no major ones
