= New Brunswick Route 320 =

Highway in New Brunswick, Canada

Route 320

Route information
- Maintained by New Brunswick Department of Transportation
- Length: 9 km (5.6 mi)

Major junctions
- West end: Route 11 in Grande-Anse
- East end: Route 303 in Maisonnette

Location
- Country: Canada
- Province: New Brunswick
- Counties: Gloucester

Highway system
- Provincial highways in New Brunswick; Former routes
← Route 315	→ Route 322

Route 320 is a short provincial route in New Brunswick, Canada that runs from Route 11 in Grande-Anse to an intersection with Route 303 in Maisonnette.

== Communities ==
- Grande-Anse
- Anse-Bleue
- Maisonnette

== See also ==
- List of New Brunswick provincial highways
