= New Brunswick Route 313 =

Highway in New Brunswick, Canada

Route 313

Route information
- Maintained by New Brunswick Department of Transportation
- Length: 18.30 km (11.37 mi)
- Existed: 1999–present

Major junctions
- North end: Route 113 Lameque
- South end: Route 113 Little Shippagan

Location
- Country: Canada
- Province: New Brunswick
- Major cities: Pointe-Alexandre, Petite-Lameque, Pointe-Canot, Sainte-Cecile, Petite-Riviere-de-l'Ile

Highway system
- Provincial highways in New Brunswick; Former routes
| ← Route 310 | → Route 315 |

Route 313 is an 18 km (11 mi) north–south secondary highway in the northeast Canadian province of New Brunswick on Lameque Island.

The route's southern terminus is near the center of Lameque Island, and it begins by running along the western coast of the island. The route (named Rue Principale) travels northwest through the town of Lameque. From here, the highway follows Chaleur Bay through the communities of Pointe-Alexandre, Petite-Lameque, and Pointe-Canot before turning northeast through the communities of Sainte-Cécile and Petite-Riviere-de-l'Ile. It ends at an intersection with Route 113 in the community of Little Shippagan.

== See also ==
- List of New Brunswick provincial highways
