= New Brunswick Route 515 =

Highway in New Brunswick, Canada

Coordinates: 46.3803°N 64.9118°W

Route 515

Route information
- Maintained by New Brunswick Department of Transportation

Major junctions
- East end: Route 134 / Route 475 in Bouctouche
- Route 11 in Bouctouche
- West end: Route 126 in Hebert

Location
- Country: Canada
- Province: New Brunswick

Highway system
- Provincial highways in New Brunswick; Former routes
← Route 510	→ Route 525

Route 515 is a 38-kilometre (24 mi) long east–west secondary highway in the south east portion of New Brunswick, Canada.

The route's eastern terminus is at Route 475 and Route 134 in the town of Bouctouche. The road runs parallel to the north bank of the Bouctouche River. Route 515 briefly merges with Route 134, which is known as Irving Blvd, as it travels southwest across Route 11 to the Bouctouche neighbourhood of Boisjoli. The road crosses a small branch of the Bouctouche River and continues to the community of Maria-de-Kent. It then crosses another small branch and continues on to the community of Sainte-Marie-de-Kent, where it intersects with the northern terminus of Route 115 and Route 525. Continuing, the road meets up with the southern terminus of Route 495 before turning west and continuing to the community of Saint-Cyrille. The road continues to the community of McLean Settlement, where it briefly merges with Route 490. Route 515 continues west to Saint-Paul before ending at Route 126 in Hebert.
