= New Brunswick Route 370 =

Highway in New Brunswick, Canada

Route 370

Route information
- Maintained by New Brunswick Department of Transportation

Major junctions
- North end: Route 11 in Tracadie–Sheila
- South end: Route 11 in Riviere-du-Portage

Location
- Country: Canada
- Province: New Brunswick
- Major cities: Pont-Lafrance

Highway system
- Provincial highways in New Brunswick; Former routes
← Route 365	→ Route 375

Route 370 is a 14-kilometre (8.7 mi) long east–west secondary highway in the northeast portion of New Brunswick, Canada.
