= New Brunswick Route 360 =

Highway in New Brunswick, Canada

Route 360

Route information
- Maintained by New Brunswick Department of Transportation

Major junctions
- East end: Route 430 south-west of Blue Mountain Settlement
- West end: Route 8 / Route 160 in Allardville

Location
- Country: Canada
- Province: New Brunswick
- Major cities: Middle Landing

Highway system
- Provincial highways in New Brunswick; Former routes
| ← Route 355 | → Route 363 |

Route 360 is a 13-kilometre (8.1 mi) long east–west secondary highway in the northeast portion of New Brunswick, Canada.

The route's eastern terminus is southwest of the community of Blue Mountain Settlement in the Brunswick Mines area close to Pabineau Lake. The road travels southeast to the community of Middle Landing and then crosses the Nepisiguit River. The route then continues through mostly treed area crossing a railway track and then intersecting with Route 8 before continuing to the community Allardville at the intersection of Route 134 and Route 160.

== Intersecting routes ==
- Route 8
