= New Brunswick Route 772 =

Highway in New Brunswick, Canada

Route 772

Route information
- Maintained by New Brunswick Department of Transportation
- Length: 20.1 km (12.5 mi)

Major junctions
- North end: Route 172 / Letete to Deer Island Ferry north of Stuart Town
- South end: Deer Island Point Road in Cummings Cove

Location
- Country: Canada
- Province: New Brunswick

Highway system
- Provincial highways in New Brunswick; Former routes
← Route 770	→ Route 774

Route 772 is a 20.1-kilometre-long (12.5 mi) north–south secondary looping highway on Deer Island, Charlotte County, New Brunswick, Canada.

== Route description ==
The route's northern terminus is at the L'Etete to Deer Island Ferry terminal on Deer Island. It travels southwest through Stuart Town and Lambertville and continues to Lords Cove then passing Richardson and Hopper Pond where the highway divides and the loop begins.

Travelling west, Route 772 passes Passamaquoddy Bay and enters Fairhaven. It continues past Clam Cove and Cummings Cove and intersects with the Deer Island Point Road. Continuing around the loop, the highway enters Chocolate Cove and Hibernia Cove, passes Bar Island, and enters Leonardville. From here, the highway turns west again to complete the loop.
