= New Brunswick Route 303 =

Highway in New Brunswick, Canada

Route 303

Route information
- Maintained by New Brunswick Department of Transportation
- Length: 7 km (4.3 mi)

Major junctions
- West end: Route 11 in Dugas
- East end: Route 320 in Maisonnette

Location
- Country: Canada
- Province: New Brunswick
- Counties: Gloucester

Highway system
- Provincial highways in New Brunswick; Former routes
← Route 280	→ Route 305

Route 303 is a short provincial route in New Brunswick, Canada that runs from Route 11 near Dugas to an intersection with Route 320 in Maisonnette.

== Communities ==
- Dugas
- Village-des-Poirier
- Maisonnette

== See also ==
- List of New Brunswick provincial highways
