= New Brunswick Route 480 =

Highway in New Brunswick, Canada

Coordinates: 46.542923°N 64.705181°W

Route 480

Route information
- Maintained by New Brunswick Department of Transportation

Major junctions
- West end: Route 126 in Acadie Siding
- East end: Route 11 / Route 117 south of Kouchibouguac

Location
- Country: Canada
- Province: New Brunswick

Highway system
- Provincial highways in New Brunswick; Former routes
← Route 475	→ Route 485

Route 480 is a 21-kilometre (13 mi) long west–east secondary highway in the northwest portion of New Brunswick, Canada.

The route's Western terminus starts at Route 126 north of Acadie Siding. The road follows the Kouchibouguac River traveling east to the community of Pineau, Centre-Acadie and Acadieville. Continuing on the road, the road passes Vautour then crosses the Kouchibouguac River as it enters the community of Saint-Luc. The road then enters a mostly treed area until it gets to the intersection of Route 11 and Route 117 south of Kouchibouguac.
