= New Brunswick Route 460 =

Highway in New Brunswick, Canada

Coordinates: 47.326723°N 65.094681°W

Route 460

Route information
- Maintained by New Brunswick Department of Transportation

Major junctions
- South end: Route 11 in Lower Neguac
- North end: Route 11 in Wishart Point

Location
- Country: Canada
- Province: New Brunswick

Highway system
- Provincial highways in New Brunswick; Former routes
← Route 455	→ Route 465

Route 460 is a 18-kilometre (11 mi) long looping secondary highway in the northwest portion of New Brunswick, Canada.

The route's southern terminus starts at the intersection of Route 11 in Lower Neguac heading north into the community of Stymiest Road, where it temporarily merges with Route 445. The road continues to travel north-west where it takes a 90 degree turn north-east into the community of Price Settlement before taking another sharp turn north-west following then crossing the Tabusintac River. The highway passes through the Tabusintac 9 Indian Reserve then enters the community of Cains Point. The road then crosses the river again heading north-east near Redpine Island, crossing the river again before entering the community of Gaythorne. The road then travels east before heading south-east near Campbells Island and then connecting up to Route 11 near Robertson Island just outside Wishart Point.
