= New Brunswick Route 505 =

Highway in New Brunswick, Canada

Coordinates: 46.618318°N 64.721146°W

Route 505

Route information
- Maintained by New Brunswick Department of Transportation

Major junctions
- North end: Route 134 / Route 495 in Five Rivers
- South end: Route 134 south of Sainte-Anne-de-Kent

Location
- Country: Canada
- Province: New Brunswick

Highway system
- Provincial highways in New Brunswick; Former routes
← Route 495	→ Route 510

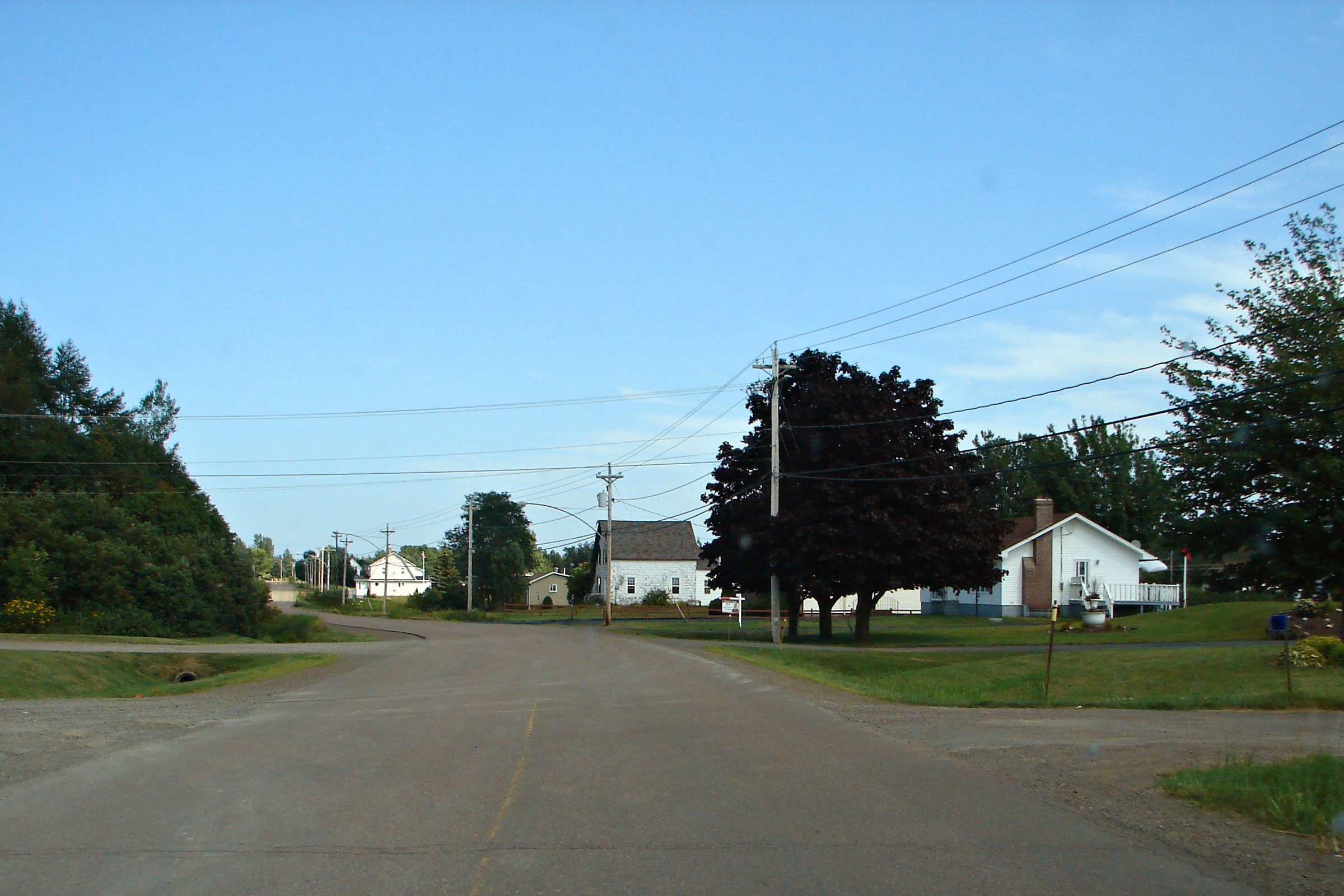
Route 505 at Richibucto Village

Route 505 is a 45-kilometre (28 mi) long north–south secondary highway in the northwest portion of New Brunswick, Canada.

The route's northern terminus is at the intersection of Route 134 and Route 495. The road begins as Centennial Avenue East and travels north-east in the village of Five Rivers. The road runs parallel to the south bank of the Richibucto River as it travels north-east crossing Beeties Creek. The road turns and crosses Route 11 in Jardineville, and it then makes a sharp 90 degree turn east entering the community of Peters Mills. The road continues and enters the community of Richibucto-Village and then Cap-Lumiere. The road then takes a sharp 90 degree turn south following the coast of the Northumberland Strait before turning slightly inland however still following the coast. The road passes Petit-Chockpish and Caissie-Village, and it crosses the Chockpish River near the merge with Route 475. It turns southeast where it ends in the community of Sainte-Anne-de-Kent at Route 134.
