= New Brunswick Route 322 =

Highway in New Brunswick, Canada

Route 322

Route information
- Maintained by New Brunswick Department of Transportation
- Length: 11 km (6.8 mi)

Major junctions
- South end: Route 315 in Bathurst
- North end: Route 315 in Nigadoo

Location
- Country: Canada
- Province: New Brunswick
- Counties: Gloucester

Highway system
- Provincial highways in New Brunswick; Former routes
← Route 320	→ Route 325

Route 322 is an 11 km (6.8 mi) local highway in northwestern New Brunswick, Canada. The road runs from New Brunswick Route 315 in Bathurst to its northern terminus at New Brunswick Route 315 in Nigadoo, as it runs parallel to the west of Route 315.

== Communities along Route 322 ==
- Bathurst
- Robertville
- Saint-Laurent
- Nigadoo

== See also ==
- List of New Brunswick provincial highways
