= New Brunswick Route 180 =

Highway in New Brunswick, Canada

Route 180

Route information
- Maintained by New Brunswick Department of Transportation
- Length: 140.0 km (87.0 mi)
- Existed: 1984–present

Major junctions
- West end: Route 17 in Saint-Quentin
- Route 260 in Five Fingers; Route 385 at Mount Carleton Provincial Park; Route 11 in Bathurst
- East end: Route 134 in Bathurst

Location
- Country: Canada
- Province: New Brunswick
- Counties: Restigouche, Gloucester

Highway system
- Provincial highways in New Brunswick; Former routes
← Route 177	→ Route 190

Route 180 is a 140 km (87 mi) collector highway in northern New Brunswick, Canada. The western terminus is Route 17 at Saint-Quentin and the eastern terminus is Route 134 (St. Peter Ave.) in Bathurst. In Saint-Quentin, the road is called rue Mgr-Martin Est, and in Bathurst, it is named Vanier Boulevard.

== Communities along Route 180 ==
- Saint-Quentin
- Five Fingers
- Rang-Seize
- Rang-Dix-Huit
- Simpson Field
- South Tetagouche
- Sainte-Anne
- Bathurst

== See also ==
- List of New Brunswick provincial highways
