= New Brunswick Route 495 =

Highway in New Brunswick, Canada

Coordinates: 46.551778°N 64.903364°W

Route 495

Route information
- Maintained by New Brunswick Department of Transportation

Major junctions
- North end: Route 134 / Route 505 in Five Rivers
- South end: Route 515 south of Saint-Marie-de-Kent

Location
- Country: Canada
- Province: New Brunswick

Highway system
- Provincial highways in New Brunswick; Former routes
← Route 490	→ Route 505

Route 495 is a 23-kilometre (14 mi) long north–south secondary highway in the northwest portion of New Brunswick, Canada.

The route's northern terminus is at the intersection of Route 134 and Route 505. It begins as Centennial Avenue West and travels south-west in the village of Five Rivers. The road runs parallel to the south bank of the Richibucto River as it travels south-west crossing Childs Creek. The road turns south and comes to the western terminus of Route 470 near Mundleville. The road then follows the St. Nicholas River as it crosses the East Branch River. The road continues to follow the South Branch River into the communities of South Branch, Balla Philip and Murphy Settlement before making a sharp 90 degree turn east. The road continues southeast passing the communities of Bastarache and Saint-Fabien before ending at Route 515 near Saint-Marie-de-Kent.
