= New Brunswick Route 530 =

Highway in New Brunswick, Canada

Coordinates: 46.354629°N 64.536438°W

Route 530

Route information
- Maintained by New Brunswick Department of Transportation

Major junctions
- North end: Route 134 in Cocagne
- South end: Route 134 in Shediac Bridge-Shediac River

Location
- Country: Canada
- Province: New Brunswick

Highway system
- Provincial highways in New Brunswick; Former routes
← Route 525	→ Route 535

Route 530 is a 22-kilometre (14 mi) long north-east looping secondary highway in the southeast portion of New Brunswick, Canada.

The route's northern terminus is at Route 134 in the community of Cocagne. The road travels southeast around a portion of Cocagne Bay to the community of Saint-Marcel. The road then makes a sharp northeast turn before heading almost due north through the community of Cocagne Cove. Route 530 continues through the community of Cocagne Cape, makes a U-turn, and continues south along the Northumberland Strait. The road passes through the communities of Caissie Cape, Bourgeois, and Grande-Digue before ending at Route 134 in the local service district of Shediac Bridge-Shediac River.
