= New Brunswick Route 115 =

Highway in New Brunswick, Canada

Route 115

Route information
- Maintained by New Brunswick Department of Transportation
- Length: 43.985 km (27.331 mi)
- Existed: 1965–present

Major junctions
- South end: Route 134 in Moncton
- Route 2 (TCH) in Moncton; Route 11 in Saint-Gregoire
- North end: Route 134 in Saint-François-de-Kent

Location
- Country: Canada
- Province: New Brunswick
- Major cities: Irishtown, Notre-Dame, Champdoré

Highway system
- Provincial highways in New Brunswick; Former routes
← Route 114	→ Route 116

Route 115 is a highway in New Brunswick, Canada; running from a junction with Route 134 in the Lewisville neighbourhood of Moncton to Route 134 in Saint-François-de-Kent (near Bouctouche, a distance of 44 kilometres.

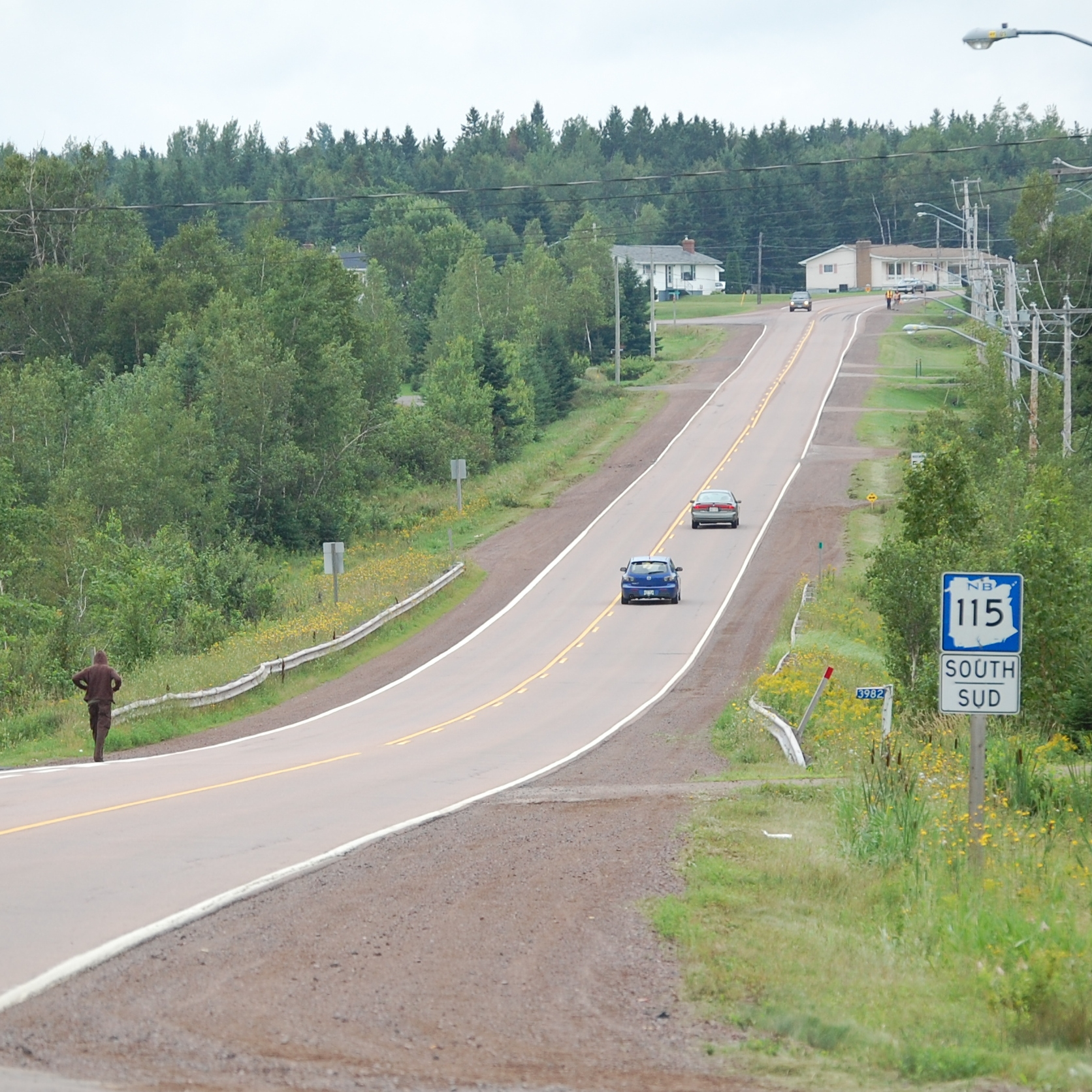
Route 115

In Moncton, Route 115 follows Elmwood Drive, a suburban arterial running due north from the city through the neighbourhood of Sunny Brae. The route continues north to the community of Irishtown, then northeast to Notre-Dame. From Notre-Dame, Route 115 turns north to the town of Champdoré, becoming known as rue Principale and chemin McKees Mills, then follows the south bank of the Little Bouctouche River to through McKees Mills as it ends in Saint-Francois-de-Kent.

== History ==
Route 115 came into existence in 1965 as a renumbering of Route 31, during a mass redesignation of provincial highways. Until the late 1970s, Route 115 was routed from Notre-Dame eastward along present-day Route 535 to its former northern terminus in Cocagne.

== See also ==
- List of New Brunswick provincial highways
