= New Brunswick Route 475 =

Highway in New Brunswick, Canada

Coordinates: 46.542923°N 64.705181°W

Route 475

Route information
- Maintained by New Brunswick Department of Transportation
- Length: 16.6 km (10.3 mi)

Major junctions
- South end: Route 134 / Route 515 in Bouctouche
- North end: Route 505 in Sainte-Anne-de-Kent

Location
- Country: Canada
- Province: New Brunswick

Highway system
- Provincial highways in New Brunswick; Former routes
← Route 470	→ Route 480

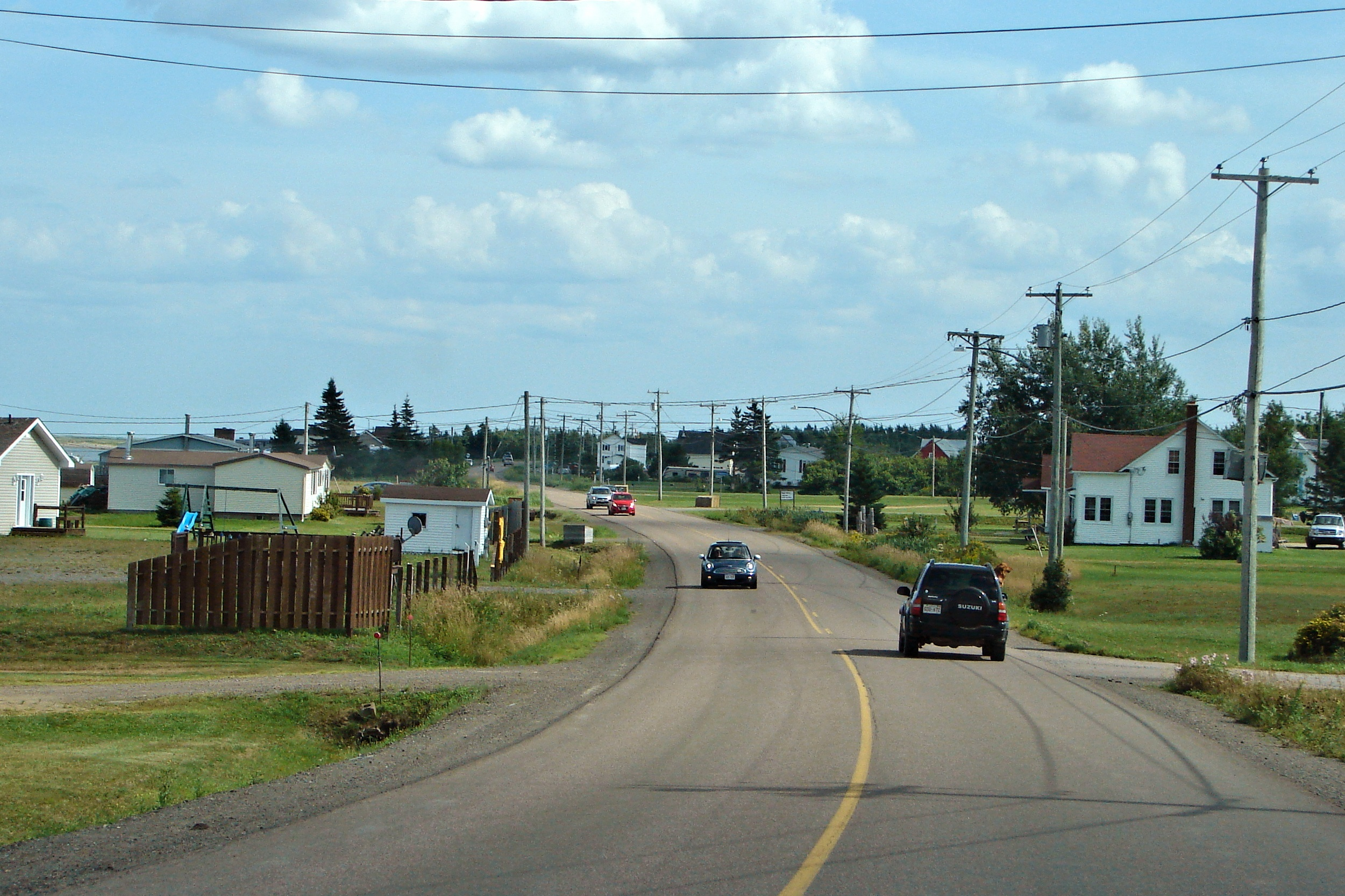
Route 475 at Saint-Edouard-de-Kent

Route 475 is a 17-kilometre (11 mi) long west–east secondary highway in the northwest portion of New Brunswick, Canada.

The route's southern terminus starts at the intersection of Route 134 and Route 515, in the town of Bouctouche. The road is a continuation of Route 515 (Irving Blvd) called Chemin-du-Couvent in the Bouctouche Neighbourhood of Sainte-Jean-Baptiste. The road travels east following the north bank of the Bouctouche Bay passing the Irving Arboretum, and Kent Museum before turning north and crossing the Mascogne River. The road continues following the Bouctouche Bay, passing by the Irving Eco-Centre passing Village-Sainte-Croix. The road now follows the Northumberland Strait crossing the Black River and the Saint-Édouard-de-Kent March into the community of Saint-Édouard-de-Kent then moving west inland upon entering the community of Chockpish. The road takes a sharp turn west as it follows the Chockpish then briefly merging with Route 505 where it ends in the community of Sainte-Anne-de-Kent.
