= New Brunswick Route 535 =

Highway in New Brunswick, Canada

Coordinates: 46.384833°N 64.618835°W

Route 535

Route information
- Maintained by New Brunswick Department of Transportation

Major junctions
- North end: Route 134 in Saint-Francois-de-Kent
- Route 11 near Cocagne
- West end: Route 115 in Notre-Dame

Location
- Country: Canada
- Province: New Brunswick

Highway system
- Provincial highways in New Brunswick; Former routes
| ← Route 530 | → Route 540 |

Route 535 is a 30-kilometre (19 mi) long north-east looping secondary highway in the south east portion of New Brunswick, Canada.

The route's northern terminus is at Route 134 in the community of Saint-Francois-de-Kent. The road travels northeast around a portion of the Cocagne Bay starting at the Little Bouctouche River until the community of Dixon Point. The road then makes a sharp southeast turn to follow the Northumberland Strait through the community of Saint-Thomas-de-Kent. It continues through the communities of Bar-de-Cocagne and Cormierville. The road then passes Surette Island and Cocagne Island before crossing into the village of Cocagne. Route 535 then crosses Route 134 and begins to follow the north bank of the Cocagne River. The road then intersects Route 11 and passes through Cocagne-Nord before ending at Route 115 in Notre-Dame.
