= CCGS Tuebor =

Canadian Coast Guard vessel

History

Canada
- Name: Tuebor
- Namesake: Latin for I will defend
- Operator: Canadian Coast Guard
- Builder: Bateau de Mer, Cocagne, New Brunswick
- Launched: 1985
- Completed: 1985
- Commissioned: 1985
- In service: 1987–2018
- Out of service: 2018
- Home port: CCG Base Saint John, New Brunswick and Quebec City, Quebec
- Identification: VO4996; 808729
- Status: Sold in 2018

General characteristics
- Type: Specialty vessel – environmental response
- Tonnage: 34.7 GT
- Length: 12.9 m (42 ft 4 in)
- Beam: 4.5 m (14 ft 9 in)
- Draft: 1.9 m (6 ft 3 in)
- Propulsion: Caterpillar 3116 geared diesel engine Volvo Penta TAMD 103A geared diesel engine
- Speed: 10 knots (19 km/h)
- Range: 500 nmi (930 km)
- Endurance: 3.5 days
- Boats & landing craft carried: RHI Zodiac (Slide)
- Complement: 3
- Sensors & processing systems: ICOM IC-M700

CCGS Tuebor was a specialty vessel of the Canadian Coast Guard used for environmental responses in the Maritimes and formerly a fisheries patrol vessel. The vessel was listed for auction in November 2018 as a "1987 Les Bateau 12M Marine Vessel..." for $30,000.00 Canadian. At time of sale she had undergone refit less than 200 hours of use prior, and was equipped with a Volvo Penta Inboard Diesel, model TAMD 103A. She was registered to Ottawa, under 808729.
