= Losier Settlement, New Brunswick =

Community in New Brunswick, Canada

Coordinates: 47.564°N 64.933°W

Location of Losier Settlement in New Brunswick

Losier Settlement is a community in the Canadian province of New Brunswick. There are 3 major highways that intersections with Losier Settlement, Route 11, Route 150, and Route 160. It is now part of the Regional Municipality of Grand Tracadie.

== See also ==
- List of communities in New Brunswick
