= Matapédia Bridge =

Bridge in Canada

Matapédia Bridge Pont Matapédia
- Coordinates: 47°58′57″N 66°55′23″W
- Crosses: Restigouche River
- Locale: Flatlands, New Brunswick, Matapédia, Quebec
- Other name(s): Pont Interprovincial; Interprovincial Bridge

Characteristics
- Total length: 419 metres (1375 feet)
- Width: Two Lanes

History
- Built: 1974

The Matapédia Bridge (French: Pont Matapédia) crosses the Restigouche River from Matapédia, Quebec to Flatlands, New Brunswick, connecting New Brunswick Route 11 to Quebec Route 132. It was built in 1974, and is 419 metres (1,375 ft) long.
