= New Brunswick Route 160 =

Highway in New Brunswick, Canada

Route 160

Route information
- Maintained by New Brunswick Department of Transportation
- Length: 49.90 km (31.01 mi)
- Existed: 1984–present

Major junctions
- West end: Route 8 / Route 360 in Allardville
- East end: Route 150 in Losier Settlement

Location
- Country: Canada
- Province: New Brunswick
- Major cities: Hautes-Terres

Highway system
- Provincial highways in New Brunswick; Former routes
← Route 150	→ Route 161

Route 160 is a 50 km (31 mi)-long east–west secondary highway in the northeast New Brunswick, Canada. In Hautes-Terres, the route is known as Boulevard des Fondateurs.

Route 160 starts at an intersection with Route 8 and Route 360 near Allardville. From there, it runs east through Hautes-Terres to its terminus at Route 150 in Losier Settlement.

== Intersecting routes ==
- Route 135 in Hautes-Terres
- Route 365 in Hautes-Terres

== River crossings ==
- Gaspereau Brook
- Pont-Landry

== Communities along the Route ==
- Pont-Landry
- Boishebert
- Hautes-Terres
- Haut Saint-Isidore
- Bois-Gagnon
- Pokemouche Landing
- Saint-Sauveur
- Allardville East

== See also ==
- List of New Brunswick provincial highways
