= Dalhousie Junction, New Brunswick =

Dalhousie Junction
- Local Service District
- Location within New Brunswick.
- Coordinates: 48.04°N 66.49°W
- Country: Canada
- Province: New Brunswick
- County: Restigouche
- Parish: Dalhousie
- Electoral Districts Federal: Madawaska—Restigouche
- Provincial: Campbellton-Dalhousie

Government
  - Type: Local Service District
  - MP: René Arseneault (Lib.)
  - MLA: Guy Arseneault (Lib.)

Area
  - Land: 16.65 km^{2} (6.43 sq mi)

Population (2016)
  - Total: 396
  - Density: 23.78/km^{2} (61.6/sq mi)
  - Pop 2011-2016: ▼7.26%
  - Dwellings: 193
- Time zone: UTC-4 (AST)
  - Summer (DST): UTC-3 (ADT)
- Postal code(s): E3N
- Area code: 506
- Access Routes Route 11: Route 134
- Median Income*: $55,168 CDN
- Median household income, 2015 (all households)

Dalhousie Junction is a rural community and former local service district in Restigouche County, New Brunswick, Canada. As of 2016, its population is 396 people.

== Demographics ==
In the 2021 Census of Population conducted by Statistics Canada, Dalhousie Junction had a population of 402 living in 182 of its 196 total private dwellings, a change of 1.5% from its 2016 population of 396. With a land area of 16.65 km^{2} (6.43 sq mi), it had a population density of 24.1/km^{2} (62.5/sq mi) in 2021.

== See also ==
- List of communities in New Brunswick
