= Buctouche River =

River in New Brunswick, Canada

Coordinates: 46.371095°N 64.877701°W

The Buctouche River (colloquially spelt Bouctouche) is a river in eastern New Brunswick, Canada which empties into the Buctouche Bay in the Northumberland Strait in the town of Bouctouche.

Buctouche means "Little Great Harbour" in the Mi'kmaq.

== River communities ==
- Saint-Joseph-de-Kent
- Maria-de-Kent
- Roy
- Sainte-Marie-de-Kent
- Upper Buctouche
- Coates Mills
- McLean Settlement
- Hebert

== River crossings ==
- Route 126
- Route 515
- Route 490
- Route 525
- Route 11
- Route 134

== See also ==
- List of rivers of New Brunswick
