= Pointe-Canot, New Brunswick =

Coordinates: 47.833252°N 64.695998°W

Pointe-Canot is an unincorporated place in New Brunswick, Canada. It is recognized as a designated place by Statistics Canada.

== Demographics ==
In the 2021 Census of Population conducted by Statistics Canada, Pointe-Canot had a population of 252 living in 119 of its 138 total private dwellings, a change of 2% from its 2016 population of 247. With a land area of 3.46 km^{2} (1.34 sq mi), it had a population density of 72.8/km^{2} (188.6/sq mi) in 2021.

== See also ==
- List of communities in New Brunswick
