= Point La Nim, New Brunswick =

Point La Nim
- Local Service District
- Location within New Brunswick.
- Coordinates: 48.06°N 66.45°W
- Country: Canada
- Province: New Brunswick
- County: Restigouche
- Parish: Dalhousie
- Electoral Districts Federal: Madawaska—Restigouche
- Provincial: Campbellton-Dalhousie

Government
  - Type: Local service district
  - MP: René Arseneault (Lib.)
  - MLA: Guy Arseneault (Lib.)

Area
  - Land: 10.91 km^{2} (4.21 sq mi)

Population (2016)
  - Total: 231
  - Density: 21.17/km^{2} (54.8/sq mi)
  - Pop 2011-2016: ▼10.81%
  - Dwellings: 130
- Time zone: UTC-4 (AST)
  - Summer (DST): UTC-3 (ADT)
- Postal code(s): E3N
- Area code: 506
- Access Routes: Route 134
- Median Income*: $57,472 CDN
- Median household income, 2015 (all households)

Point La Nim (2016 pop. 231) is an unincorporated community and former local service district in Restigouche County, New Brunswick, Canada.

The community is located on the Restigouche River immediately upstream (west) from the town of Dalhousie. Its name was taken from Mi'kmaq name "ananimkik" which translates to "lookout place". Located west of Dalhousie. Point La Nim's post office was originally called "Point La Nin" in 1855. It was renamed Point La Nim in 1862.

== Demographics ==
In the 2021 Census of Population conducted by Statistics Canada, Point La Nim / Pointe La Nim had a population of 247 living in 120 of its 131 total private dwellings, a change of 6.9% from its 2016 population of 231. With a land area of 10.92 km^{2} (4.22 sq mi), it had a population density of 22.6/km^{2} (58.6/sq mi) in 2021.

== See also ==
- List of communities in New Brunswick
