= Rosaireville, New Brunswick =

Eastern New Brunswick community

Coordinates: 46°49′30″N 65°17′59″W

Rosaireville is a community in the Canadian province of New Brunswick in Northumberland County, located mainly on Route 440.

== Notable people ==
- Lisa LeBlanc, singer-songwriter born in 1990.
- Johnny Burke, country singer

== See also ==
- List of communities in New Brunswick
