= Allainville, New Brunswick =

Coordinates: 47.2955°N 65.252194°W

Location of Allainville in New Brunswick

Allainville is a community in Northumberland County in the Canadian province of New Brunswick. Originally named New Chelsea, the community was renamed to Allainville in 1940 in honour of Thomas Allain, an early settler. It is in the parish of Alnwick.

== See also ==
- List of communities in New Brunswick
