= McLeods, New Brunswick =

McLeods
- Local Service District
- Location within New Brunswick.
- Coordinates: 48.02°N 66.57°W
- Country: Canada
- Province: New Brunswick
- County: Restigouche
- Parish: Dalhousie
- Electoral Districts Federal: Madawaska—Restigouche
- Provincial: Campbellton-Dalhousie

Government
  - Type: Local Service District
  - MP: René Arseneault (Lib.)
  - MLA: Guy Arseneault (Lib.)

Area
  - Land: 14.55 km^{2} (5.62 sq mi)

Population (2016)
  - Total: 372
  - Density: 25.57/km^{2} (66.2/sq mi)
  - Pop 2011-2016: ▼2.36%
  - Dwellings: 188
- Time zone: UTC-4 (AST)
  - Summer (DST): UTC-3 (ADT)
- Postal code(s): E3N
- Area code: 506
- Access Routes Route 11: Route 134; Route 280
- Median Income*: $70,656 CDN
- Median household income, 2015 (all households)

McLeods was a local service district in Restigouche County, New Brunswick, Canada. In 2016, it had a population of 372 people.

== Demographics ==
In the 2021 Census of Population conducted by Statistics Canada, McLeods had a population of 383 living in 176 of its 205 total private dwellings, a change of 3% from its 2016 population of 372. With a land area of 14.55 km^{2} (5.62 sq mi), it had a population density of 26.3/km^{2} (68.2/sq mi) in 2021.

== See also ==
- List of communities in New Brunswick
