= Caissie Cape, New Brunswick =

Community in New Brunswick, Canada

Coordinates: 46°20′N 64°32′W

Caissie Cape English: /ˈkeɪsiː/ French: Cap-des-Caissie, is a small coastal community in Dundas Parish, Kent County, New Brunswick. Bordered on the north by Cocagne Cape, to the east by Cocagne Cove, and to the south by Bourgeois, Caissie Cape comprises New Brunswick Route 530, Chemin De La Cote (Shore Road in English) and the roads that run between them. The community mostly consists of cottages owned by residents of New Brunswick, especially Moncton, though year-round homes do exist. Those who do live in Caissie Cape year round are primarily Acadians. Many of the streets are privately owned, as is common with other cottage communities in the area such as Grande-Digue and Shediac Bridge-Shediac River.

== History ==
The name Caissie Cape is derived from the community's waterfront location as well as its history. As is typical with New Brunswick communities, Caissie Cape is named after those who settled it, Joseph Caissie, a descendant of Roger Kuessey (Sasey, Caissy, Quessy) originally from Ireland, a settler of the Chignecto area in the 1600s, as well as other grantees in the area. In 1898 Caissie Cape was a farming and fishing settlement with a lobster factory and a population of 200. A post office branch was located here from 1931 to 1955.

In the early 1930s, Tony Downing cleared some of the wooded area near his shop and built twenty summer cottages. The area was known informally as Downing's Beach. Soon, this area became a popular summer destination and rapidly expanded. There is no record of this area of Caissie Cape ever being legally called Downing's Beach. Other sections were developed by the LeBlanc's.

Tony's Store is a general store and popular landmark in the area. Located on Rue De La Cote, it is known primarily for selling ice cream. The store was founded by Tony and Elodie Downing (née DeGrace) in 1932. Originally, the store was attached to their house and at one time also served as a gas station. It is common ritual for one to spend a day at the beach and then buy an ice cream cone at Tony's. The store and many buildings were destroyed by the Fire of 1946. The building was rebuilt the next year.

== See also ==
- List of communities in New Brunswick
