= Lavillette, New Brunswick =

Lavillette
- Location within New Brunswick
- Coordinates: 47.261243°N 65.328663°W
- Country: Canada
- Province: New Brunswick
- County: Northumberland
- Parish: Alnwick
- Electoral Districts Federal: Miramichi—Grand Lake
- Provincial: Miramichi Bay-Neguac

Government
  - MP: Pat Finnigan (Lib.)
  - MLA: Lisa Harris (Lib.)
- Postal code(s): E9G: 2P5, 2P6, 2P7, 2R8, 2P9, 2S1, 2S2, 2S3
- Area code: 506
- Access Routes Route 8: Route 450

Lavillette is a community in the Canadian province of New Brunswick, in Alnwick Parish of Northumberland County. It is in the Acadian Peninsula region.

== See also ==
- List of communities in New Brunswick
