= St. Margarets, New Brunswick =

Coordinates: 46.906°N 65.196°W

Saint Margaret's Church in Saint-Margarets

Location of St. Margarets in New Brunswick

St. Margarets is a settlement in Northumberland County, New Brunswick near the intersection of Route 11 and Route 440.

The former local service district of St. Margarets took its name from the community.

== Demographics ==
In the 2021 Census of Population conducted by Statistics Canada, St. Margarets had a population of 269 living in 113 of its 125 total private dwellings, a change of 4.3% from its 2016 population of 258. With a land area of 56.73 km^{2} (21.90 sq mi), it had a population density of 4.7/km^{2} (12.3/sq mi) in 2021.

== See also ==
- List of communities in New Brunswick
