= Rivière-du-Portage, New Brunswick =

Coordinates: 47.420°N 64.934°W

Location of Rivière-du-Portage in the province of New Brunswick

Rivière-du-Portage was a settlement in Northumberland County, New Brunswick at the intersection of Route 11 and the eastern terminus of Route 370. This community was incorporated into the Regional Municipality of Grand Tracadie–Sheila.

== See also ==
- History of New Brunswick
- List of communities in New Brunswick
