= Shediac Cape, New Brunswick =

Coordinates: 46.236996°N 64.564701°W

Shediac Cape is an unincorporated place in New Brunswick, Canada. It is recognized as a designated place by Statistics Canada.

== Demographics ==
In the 2021 Census of Population conducted by Statistics Canada, Shediac Cape had a population of 1,062 living in 429 of its 493 total private dwellings, a change of 26.7% from its 2016 population of 838. With a land area of 38.95 km^{2} (15.04 sq mi), it had a population density of 27.3/km^{2} (70.6/sq mi) in 2021.

== See also ==
- List of communities in New Brunswick
