= Six Roads, New Brunswick =

Coordinates: 47.622595°N 64.872122°W

Location of Six-Roads in New Brunswick

Six-Roads is a settlement in New Brunswick, Canada. The Community is located mainly at the intersection of Route 355 and Route 11. Since 2014 it has been part of the Regional Municipality of Tracadie.

== See also ==
- List of communities in New Brunswick
