= Richibucto-Village, New Brunswick =

Coordinates: 46.659°N 64.760°W

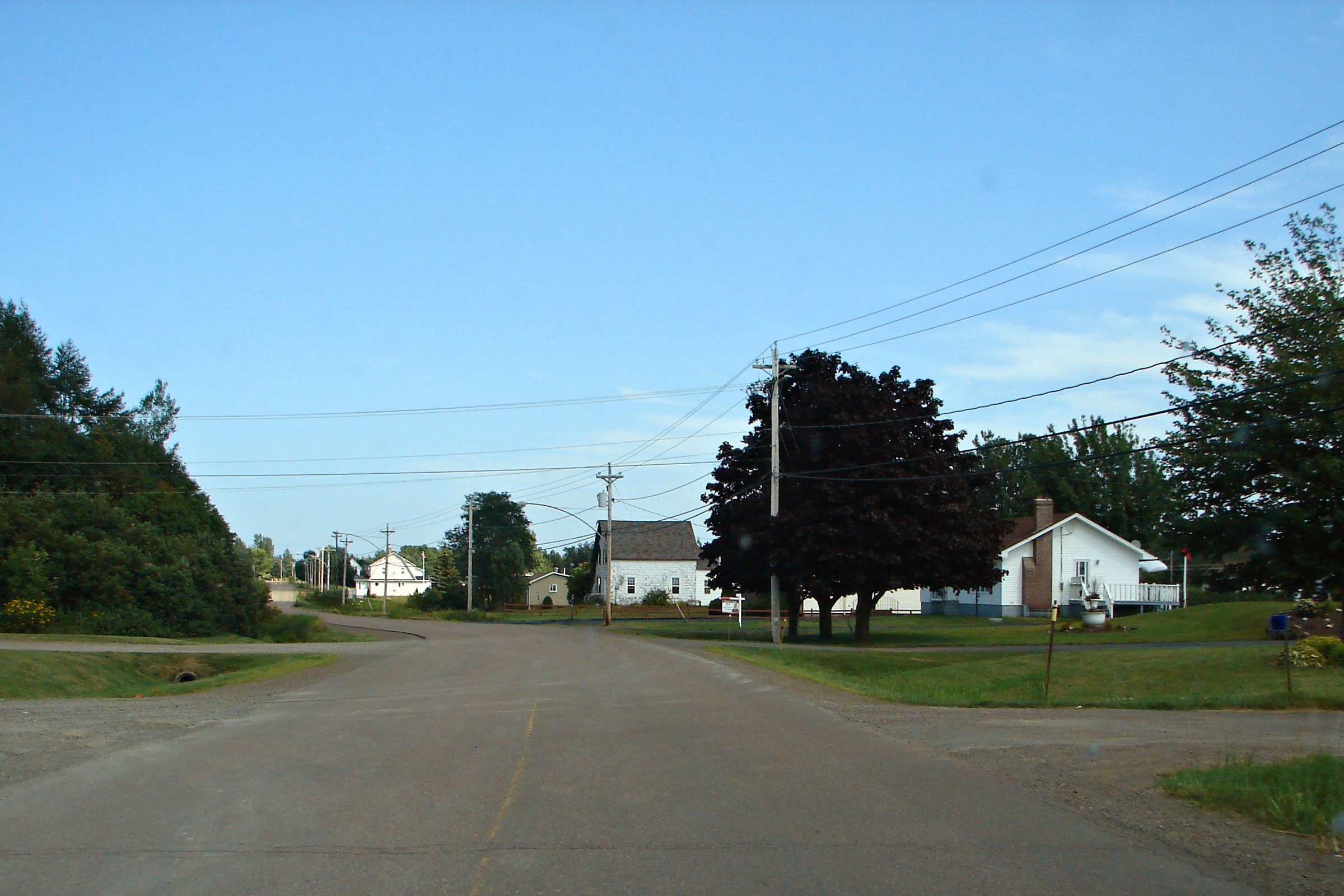
Richibouctou Village

Location of Richibouctou-Village in New Brunswick

Richibucto-Village (often spelt Richibouctou-Village) is a settlement in Kent County, New Brunswick, on Route 505.

== History ==
On January 1, 2023, in the 2023 local governance reforms, the settlement became part of the Kent Rural District.

== See also ==
- List of communities in New Brunswick
- Five Rivers, New Brunswick
- Richibucto, New Brunswick
- Bonar Law
