= Anse-Bleue, New Brunswick =

Coordinates: 47.8283°N 65.0818°W

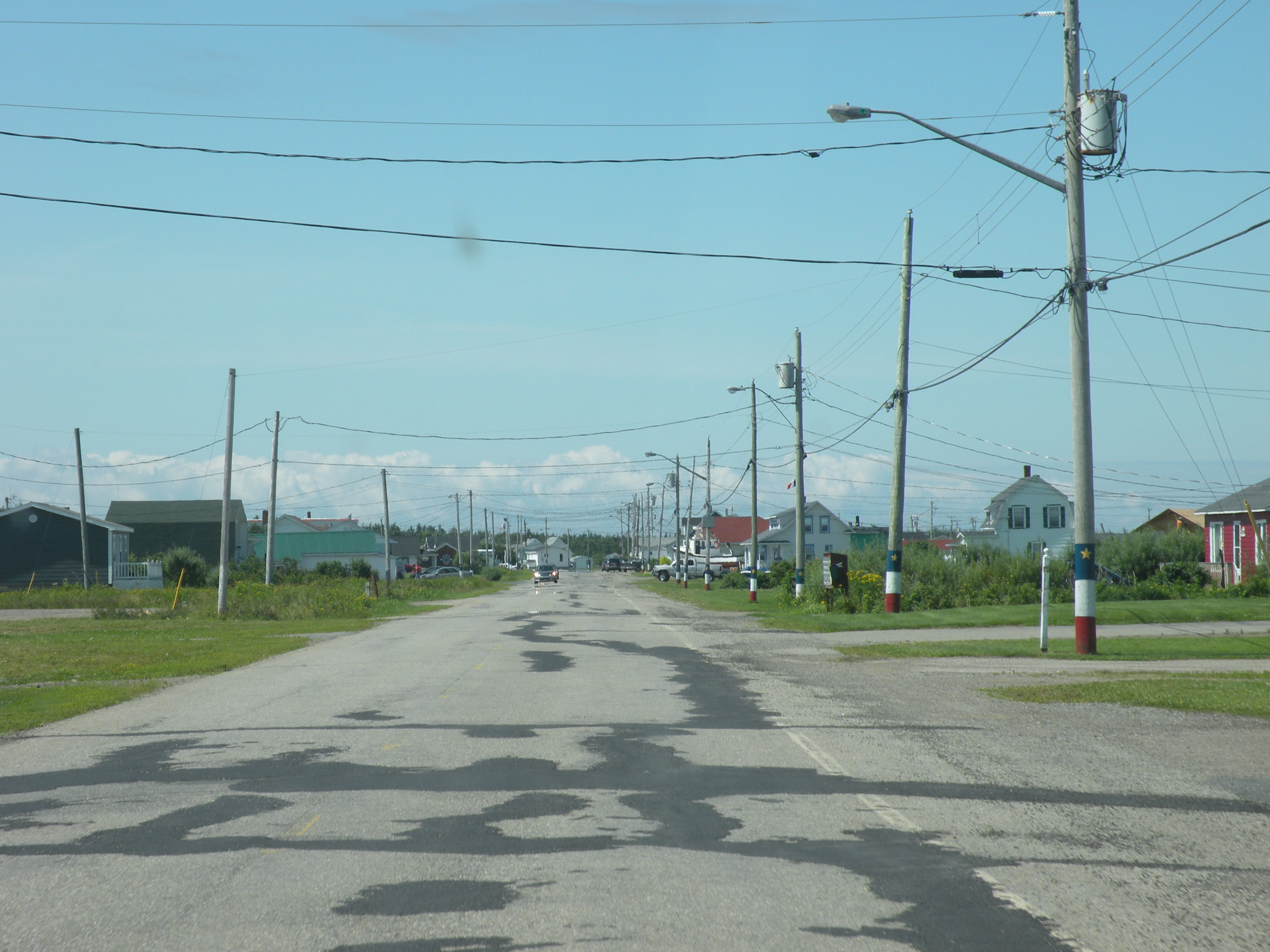
Street in Anse-Bleue

Location of Anse-Bleue in New Brunswick

Anse-Bleue (/ænzˈbʌlə/ anz-BUL-ə) is a community in the Canadian province of New Brunswick. The small community is located in New Bandon Parish in Gloucester County, northern New Brunswick, on the southern shore of Chaleur Bay. Most of the population is of Acadian descent and is located along the beach.

Prior to 2023 local governance reforms, the community formed a local service district.

== Demographics ==
In the 2021 Census of Population conducted by Statistics Canada, Anse-Bleue had a population of 338 living in 163 of its 201 total private dwellings, a change of 3.4% from its 2016 population of 327. With a land area of 9.03 km^{2} (3.49 sq mi), it had a population density of 37.4/km^{2} (96.9/sq mi) in 2021.
