= Village-Saint-Laurent, New Brunswick =

Coordinates: 47.7250°N 65.7737°W

Location of Village-Saint-Laurent in New Brunswick

Village-Saint-Laurent is a settlement in New Brunswick.

== See also ==
- List of communities in New Brunswick
