= South Tetagouche, New Brunswick =

Community in New Brunswick, Canada

South Tetagouche
- Unincorporated community
- Interactive map of South Tetagouche
- Coordinates: 47°36′N 65°49′W
- Country: Canada
- Province: New Brunswick
- County: Gloucester County
- Time zone: UTC−4 (Atlantic Standard Time)
  - Summer (DST): UTC−3 (Atlantic Daylight Time)
- Area code: 506

South Tetagouche is an unincorporated community in Gloucester County, New Brunswick, Canada. South Tetagouche is an unincorporated community in Gloucester County, New Brunswick, Canada. The community is west of Bathurst.

== See also ==
- List of communities in New Brunswick
