= Acadieville, New Brunswick =

Acadieville
- Location of Acadieville in New Brunswick
- Coordinates: 46.7308353°N 65.266629°W
- Country: Canada
- Province: New Brunswick
- County: Kent County
- Lowest elevation: 0 m (0 ft)
- Time zone: UTC-4 (Atlantic (AST))
  - Summer (DST): UTC-3 (ADT)
- Area code: 506
- NTS Map: 21I10 Richibucto

Acadieville is a small rural community in New Brunswick, Canada situated on the Kouchibouguac River west of Kouchibouguac National Park. Acadieville has approximately 600 people. The population is mostly French Acadian. The Route is on Route 480.

== Education ==
District	School name	Grades	Notes
Francophone Sud			
Anglophone North			

== See also ==
- List of communities in New Brunswick
