= Fairisle, New Brunswick =

Community in New Brunswick, Canada

Coordinates: 47.279306°N 65.124528°W

Location of Fairisle in New Brunswick

Fairisle or Fair Isle is a community in the Canadian province of New Brunswick. It is situated in Alnwick, a parish of Northumberland County.

The former local service district of Fair Isle took its name from this community but spelt it differently.

== Demographics ==
In the 2021 Census of Population conducted by Statistics Canada, Fair Isle had a population of 895 living in 387 of its 415 total private dwellings, a change of -4.4% from its 2016 population of 936. With a land area of 64.44 km^{2} (24.88 sq mi), it had a population density of 13.9/km^{2} (36.0/sq mi) in 2021.

== See also ==
- List of communities in New Brunswick
