= LaPlante, New Brunswick =

Coordinates: 47.769°N 65.774°W

Location of LaPlante in New Brunswick

LaPlante is a settlement in New Brunswick.

The former local service district of Laplante took the name of the community but was styled differently.

== Demographics ==
In the 2021 Census of Population conducted by Statistics Canada, Laplante had a population of 320 living in 129 of its 135 total private dwellings, a change of -2.4% from its 2016 population of 328. With a land area of 7.19 km^{2} (2.78 sq mi), it had a population density of 44.5/km^{2} (115.3/sq mi) in 2021.

== See also ==
- List of communities in New Brunswick
