= Notre-Dame, New Brunswick =

Notre-Dame
- Location of Notre-Dame in New Brunswick
- Coordinates: 46.311°N 64.723°W
- Country: Canada
- Province: New Brunswick
- County: Kent County
- Lowest elevation: 0 m (0 ft)
- Time zone: UTC-4 (Atlantic (AST))
  - Summer (DST): UTC-3 (ADT)
- Area code: 506

Notre-Dame is a settlement in New Brunswick around the intersection of Route 115 and Route 535 on the Cocagne River.

== See also ==
- List of communities in New Brunswick
