= Lagacéville, New Brunswick =

Coordinates: 47°13′47.9″N 65°10′37.5″W

Location of Lagacéville in New Brunswick

Lagacéville is a community in Northumberland County, New Brunswick.

== See also ==
- List of communities in New Brunswick
