= Sainte-Rose, New Brunswick =

Coordinates: 47.621265°N 64.956579°W

Location of Sainte-Rose in New Brunswick

Sainte-Rose was a settlement in New Brunswick. Originally surveyed as the Ste. Rose Settlement for land grants, it eventually differentiated into the communities of Sainte-Rose-Gloucester and Haut-Sainte-Rose; from 1988 it formed the core of a local service district named Sainte-Rose. It was annexed by the Regional Municipality of Tracadie in 2014.

== Demographics ==
In the 2021 Census of Population conducted by Statistics Canada, Sainte-Rose had a population of 721 living in 319 of its 340 total private dwellings, a change of -3.1% from its 2016 population of 744. With a land area of 48.47 km^{2} (18.71 sq mi), it had a population density of 14.9/km^{2} (38.5/sq mi) in 2021.

Population of Sainte-Rose
Name	Population (2021)	Population (2016)	Change	Land area (km^{2})	Population density
Sainte-Rose part A	706	744	−5.1%	42.45	16.6/km^{2}
Sainte-Rose part B	15	0	NA	6.02	2.5/km^{2}
Total	721	744	−3.1%	48.47	14.9/km^{2}

== See also ==
- List of communities in New Brunswick
