= Shediac Bridge-Shediac River =

Community in New Brunswick, Canada

Coordinates: 46.2737°N 64.6037°W

Location of Shediac Bridge-Shediac River in New Brunswick

Shediac Bridge-Shediac River was a local service district in the Canadian province of New Brunswick. The small local service district is located in Shediac Parish, Westmorland County, and Dundas Parish, Kent County, straddling the lower reaches of the Shediac River. It is now part of the incorporated rural community of Beausoleil.

== Demographics ==
In the 2021 Census of Population conducted by Statistics Canada, Shediac Bridge - Shediac River had a population of 1,177 living in 544 of its 661 total private dwellings, a change of 7.2% from its 2016 population of 1,098. With a land area of 10.99 km^{2} (4.24 sq mi), it had a population density of 107.1/km^{2} (277.4/sq mi) in 2021.
