= Kouchibouguac, New Brunswick =

Coordinates: 46°47′44.6″N 65°3′21.1″W

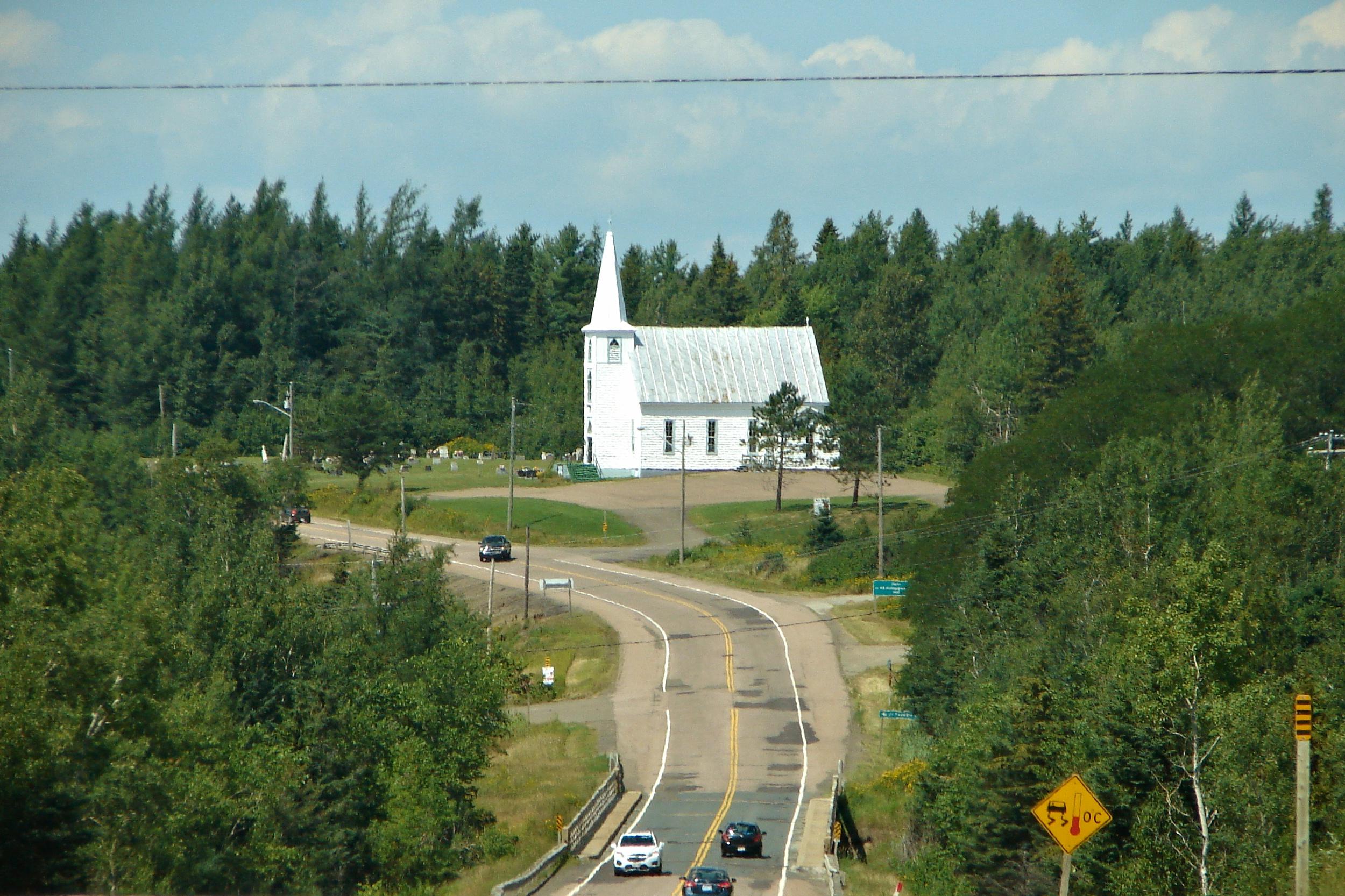
Kouchibouguac

Kouchibouguac is a community in the Canadian province of New Brunswick. Kouchibouguac is also home to Kouchibouguac National Park.

Kouchibouguac is a corruption, partially through the French, of the Mi'kmaq Pijeboogwek, meaning "long tideway river"- a descriptive for the length of the river's tidal estuary. The name was adopted for the region's national park in 1971.

== See also ==
- List of communities in New Brunswick
