= Cocagne =

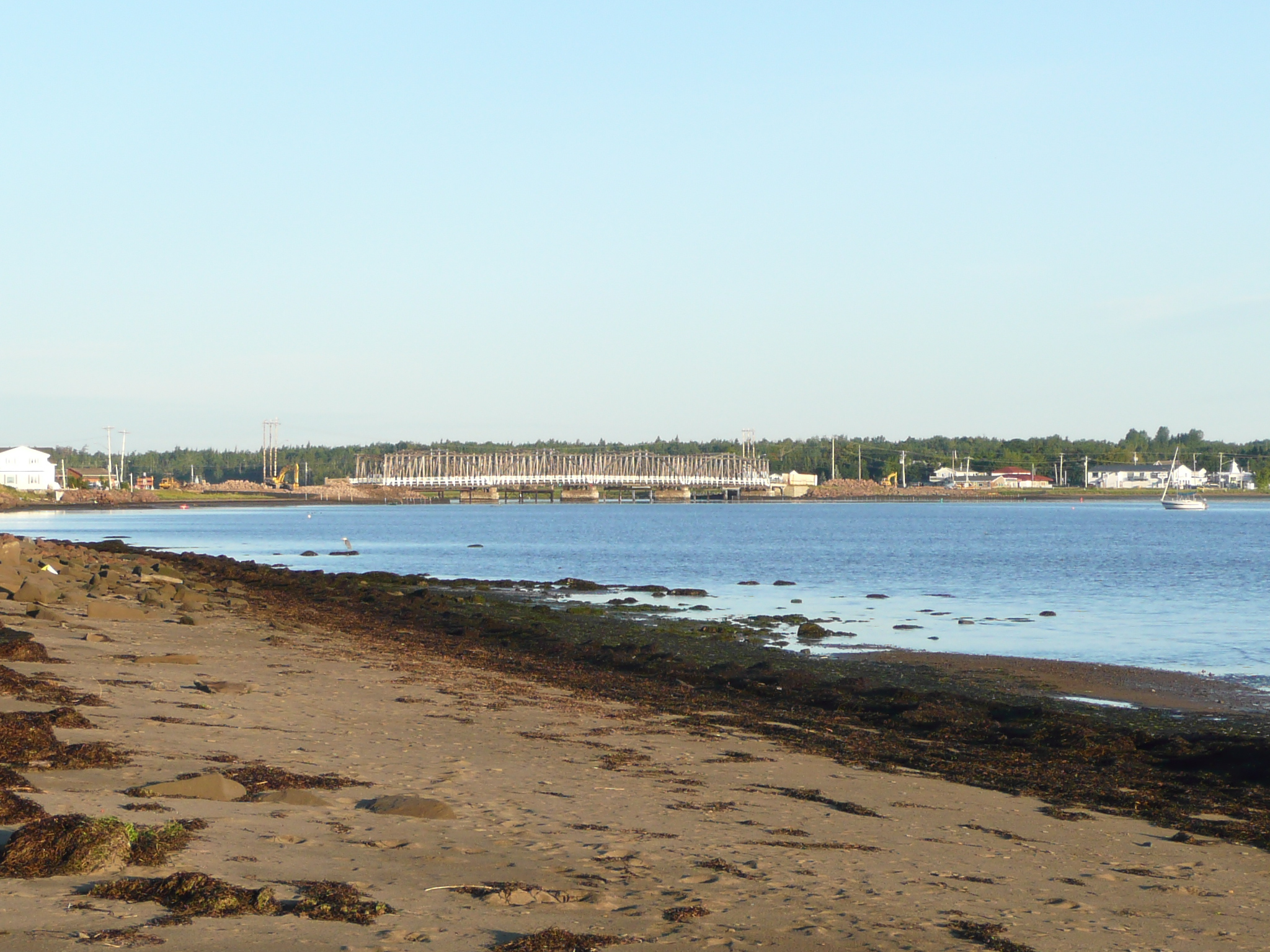

- Location of Cocagne in New Brunswick
- Coordinates: 46°20′26″N 64°37′12″W
- Country: Canada
- Province: New Brunswick
- County: Kent County
- Municipality: Beausoleil
- Settled: 1767

Government
  - MP: Dominic LeBlanc (L)
  - Provincial Representative: Benoît Bourque (L)

Area
  - Land: 69.23 km^{2} (26.73 sq mi)
- Lowest elevation: 0 m (0 ft)

Population (2021)
  - Total: 2,757
  - Density: 39.8/km^{2} (103/sq mi)
  - Change 2016-2021: ▲4.1%
- Time zone: UTC-4 (Atlantic (AST))
  - Summer (DST): UTC-3 (ADT)
- Cocagne Range Front Lighthouse
- Constructed: 1907
- Foundation: concrete base
- Construction: wooden tower
- Height: 7 m (23 ft)
- Shape: square truncated tower with balcony and lantern
- Markings: white tower, red lantern
- Power source: solar power
- Operator: private
- Focal height: 8 m (26 ft)
- Range: 13 nmi (24 km; 15 mi)
- Characteristic: F Y

Cocagne (English: /koʊˈkæn/) is a Canadian community, formerly part of an eponymous local service district (LSD) and later incorporated rural community, in Kent County, New Brunswick. It is now part of the rural community of Beausoleil.

== History ==
It was named after Cockaigne, a mythical paradise in medieval French literature. It is located at the mouth of the Cocagne River on the Northumberland Strait.

William Francis Ganong identified the Mi'kmaq name as Wijulmacadie, referring to a plant found along the river. In 1866 Cocagne was a farming community with about 65 families: in 1871 the community and surrounding district had a population of 900: in 1898 Cocagne was a sub-port of entry with a population of 250. A post office branch has been located here since 1837.

On 1 January 2023, the rural community of Cocagne amalgamated with all or part of six LSDs to form the new rural community of Beausoleil. The community's name remains in official use, as do those of other communities within the former rural community.

== Geography ==
The community is located around the mouth of the Cocagne River in Cocagne Bay at the crossroads of Route 535 and Route 134. Cocagne is also located on the northern terminus of Route 530

== Demographics ==
In the 2021 Census of Population conducted by Statistics Canada, Cocagne had a population of 2,757 living in 1,214 of its 1,430 total private dwellings, a change of 4.1% from its 2016 population of 2,649. With a land area of 69.23 km^{2} (26.73 sq mi), it had a population density of 39.8/km^{2} (103.1/sq mi) in 2021.

== Education ==
- École Blanche-Bourgeois

== Notable people ==
- Auguste Théophile Léger (1852-1923) - New Brunswick politician
- Alfred Edmond Bourgeois (1872-1939) - New Brunswick politician, clerk, landlord and merchant.
- Allison Dysart (1880-1962) - New Brunswick politician, lawyer and judge
- Louis-Prudent-Alexandre Robichaud (1890-1971) - New Brunswick political figure and jurist.
- Michel Cormier (b. 1957) - Canadian journalist, lecturer and author.

== See also ==
- List of lighthouses in New Brunswick
- List of communities in New Brunswick
