= List of former New Brunswick provincial highways =

- Standard highway markers for New Brunswick

Highway names
- Provincial Highways: New Brunswick Route XX (Route XX)

System links
- Provincial highways in New Brunswick; Former routes

Until 1965, New Brunswick highways were numbered consecutively from 1 to 42. A massive renumbering led to the current three-tier system. Some changes have taken place to highway numbering since then, and the following numbers are no longer used:

- Route 2A—2 sections:
  - Fredericton-Saint John area—Fredericton to Saint John via Broad Road; Designated as Route 7.
  - Moncton area—Salisbury to Sackville, via Downtown Moncton, after Moncton Bypass was built in the early 1960s; Designated as Route 6 in 1965 (see below), then Route 106 in 1984.
- Route 2B
- Route 5 (1927–1981)—Original route now designated as Route 555; Route 5 realigned and renumbered as Route 95.
- Route 6 (1927–1965)—Renumbered Route 555; now Route 110
- Route 6 (1965–1984)—Designated as Route 106 in 1984.
- Route 7 (1927–1965)—renumbered Route 19, now Route 190
- Route 9 (1927–1965)—Fredericton to Sussex, later part of Route 2; now part of Route 105 and Route 10.
- Route 9 (1965-197?)—Route 1 to Quispamsis; now part of Route 100.
- Route 9A
- Route 12 (1927–1965)—Newcastle to Chatham (Miramichi region); this section was absorbed as part of route 126 in 1965.
- Route 12 (1965–1976)—Fredericton – Lincoln; now designated as part of route 102.
- Route 13 (1927–1965) —Pokemouche to Miscou Island; Now designated as Route 113.
- Route 14 (1927–1965)—Now designated as Route 114
- Route 14 (1965–1984)—St-Jacques to St-Basile via Edmundston downtown; now designated as part of route 144.
- Route 18—Grand Falls to US Border near Hamlin, ME; now designated as route 218.
- Route 19 (1927–1965)—Limestone to US Border; now designated as route 375.
- Route 19—Perth-Andover to US Border; now designated as route 190.
- Route 20—Edmundston to Quebec border, by Lac Baker; now designated as route 120.
- Route 20A—Caron Brook to Connors via Clair; now designated as route 161 and route 205.
- Route 21—Fredericton to Grand Falls; now designated as route 105.
- Route 22—Grand Falls to north of Perth; now designated as route 108.
- Route 23—Three Brooks to Nictau; now designated as route 108.
- Route 24—Hartland to Mouth of Keswick; now designated as route 104.
- Route 25—Fredericton to Boiestown; now designated as routes 620 and 625.
- Route 25A—Stanley to Nashwaak Bridge; now designated as part of route 107.
- Route 26—Maine (Forest City) to Meductic; now designated as part of route 122.
- Route 27—Andersonville to St. Croix; now designated as route 630.
- Route 28—Welsford to Fredericton; now designated as route 101.
- Route 29—Saint John to Sussex; now designated as route 111.
- Route 30—Coles Island to Salisbury; now designated as route 112.
- Route 31—Moncton to Cocagne via St-Antoine; now designated as route 115.
- Route 32—Parts of it now designated as route 132.
- Route 33—Moncton to Miramichi; now designated as route 126.
- Route 34—Chipman to Rexton; now designated as route 116.
- Route 35—Now designated as route 135.
- Route 36
- Route 37—Now designated as route 440.
- Route 38—Dalhousie to Campbellton, via Eel River Crossing, Balmoral and Val D'Amours; now designated as Route 275, but extended through St-Arthur via former Route 270.
- Route 39
- Route 40—Now designated as route 124.
- Route 41—Now designated as route 127.
- Route 42—Now designated as route 560.
- Route 96 (unsigned) – Royree Road (2 km west of New Brunswick Route 720) – Route 3 in St. Stephen, New Brunswick (via St. Stephen Drive; now entirely absorbed by Route 1)
- Route 106 (1965–1968)— Hartland – Perth-Andover (Now part of Routes 103 and 130)
- Route 106 (1976–1984)— Oromocto – Route 7 at Geary (Became part of Route 660; now unnumbered)
- Route 110 (1965)
- Route 125—Perth-Andover – Grand Falls (Now part of Route 105)
- Route 142—Saint John – Grand Bay (via Westfield Road)
- Route 191—Bathurst – Janeville (via Bridge Street/Cape Road)
- Route 192
- Route 270—Campbellton – Val d'Amour – Route 275 (via Val d'Amour Road)
- Route 393—Plaster Rock – Hazeldean (Now part of Route 108)
- Route 520
- Route 545
- Route 555 (1965–1976)—Florenceville-Bristol – Maine (Now Route 110)
- Route 650
- Route 660—Oromocto – Geary – Blissville (via Broad Road/Branch Road)
- Route 685
- Route 720—Route 725 to Route 170 in Saint Stephen via Church Street (Now part of Route 725)
- Route 765—Lawrence Station – Waweig (Now part of Route 127)
- Route 810
- Route 930—Upper Sackville – Haute Aboujagane (via Upper Aboujagane Road)
