= Department of Transportation (New Brunswick) =

Canadian provincial government agency

The Department of Transportation is a part of the Government of New Brunswick. It is charged with the maintenance of the provincial highway network and the management of the province's automobile fleet.

The department was established in 1967 when Premier Louis Robichaud split the Department of Public Works and Highways. In 2012, it returned to these roots when it was merged with most of the Department of Supply and Services to form a new Department of Transportation and Infrastructure.

== Ministers ==
| # | Minister | Term | Administration |
|---|---|---|---|
| 1. | Andre Richard | November 20, 1967 - November 12, 1970 | under Robichaud |
| 2. | J. Stewart Brooks | November 12, 1970 - July 18, 1972 | under Hatfield |
| 3. | W. G. Bishop | July 18, 1972 - October 3, 1985 | under Hatfield |
| 4. | Robert McCready | October 3, 1985 - October 27, 1987 | under Hatfield |
| 5. | Sheldon Lee | October 27, 1987 - October 13, 1997 | under McKenna |
| 5. | Sheldon Lee | October 13, 1997 - May 14, 1998 | under Frenette |
| 5. | Sheldon Lee | May 14, 1998 - June 21, 1999 | under Thériault |
| 6. | Margaret-Ann Blaney | June 21, 1999 - October 9, 2001 | under Lord |
| 7. | Percy Mockler | October 9, 2001 - June 27, 2003 | under Lord |
| 8. | Paul Robichaud | June 27, 2003 - October 3, 2006 | under Lord |
| 9. | Denis Landry | October 3, 2006 - October 12, 2010 | under Graham |
| 10. | Claude Williams | October 12, 2010 - March 15, 2012* | under Alward |

* Williams continued with responsibility for this department when it was merged into the new Department of Transportation & Infrastructure.
