= List of designated places in New Brunswick =

A designated place is a type of geographic unit used by Statistics Canada to disseminate census data. It is usually "a small community that does not meet the criteria used to define incorporated municipalities or Statistics Canada population centres (areas with a population of at least 1,000 and no fewer than 400 persons per square kilometre)." Provincial and territorial authorities collaborate with Statistics Canada in the creation of designated places so that data can be published for sub-areas within municipalities. Starting in 2016, Statistics Canada allowed the overlapping of designated places with population centres.

In the 2021 Census of Population, New Brunswick had 161 designated places, an increase from 157 in 2016. Designated place types in New Brunswick include 8 former local governments, 152 local service districts (Note: Local service districts (LSDs) delineated by Statistics Canada usually correspond to provincially-delineated LSDs but may have boundary and/or name differences or correspond to areas with altered services that are only part of a provincial-delineated LSD. Examples include the Alcida census LSD, based on the Alcida and Dauversière service area of the parish of Beresford LSD, and the Chiasson-Savoy census LSD, which includes a large area to the north of the provincial LSD of the same name.) and a single retired population centre. In 2021, the 161 designated places had a cumulative population of 93,925 and an average population of 583. New Brunswick's largest designated place is Tracadie with a population of 5,349.

== List ==
List of designated places in New Brunswick
| Name | Type | 2021 Census of Population | | | | |
| Name | Type | Population (2021) | Population (2016) | Change (%) | Land area (km^{2}) | Population density (per km^{2}) |
|---|---|---|---|---|---|---|
| Aldouane | Local service district | 947 | 895 | +5.8% | 9.95 | 95.2/km^{2} |
| Anse-Bleue | Local service district | 338 | 327 | +3.4% | 9.03 | 37.4/km^{2} |
| Atholville | Former local government | 1,084 | 1,150 | −5.7% | 10.27 | 105.6/km^{2} |
| Baie du Petit Pokemouche | Local service district | 162 | 162 | 0.0% | 2.69 | 60.2/km^{2} |
| Baie Ste. Anne | Local service district | 1,252 | 1,319 | −5.1% | 28.27 | 44.3/km^{2} |
| Baie-Verte | Local service district | 421 | 316 | +33.2% | 35.54 | 11.8/km^{2} |
| Baker Brook | Former local government | 555 | 564 | −1.6% | 12.31 | 45.1/km^{2} |
| Balmoral - St. Maure | Local service district | 156 | 148 | +5.4% | 11.2 | 13.9/km^{2} |
| Barryville-New Jersey | Local service district | 214 | 210 | +1.9% | 46.46 | 4.6/km^{2} |
| Bayfield | Local service district | 42 | 34 | +23.5% | 1.42 | 29.6/km^{2} |
| Bayside | Local service district | 355 | 347 | +2.3% | 33.99 | 10.4/km^{2} |
| Beaver Harbour | Local service district | 291 | 277 | +5.1% | 2.25 | 129.3/km^{2} |
| Benoit | Local service district | 161 | 198 | −18.7% | 3.69 | 43.6/km^{2} |
| Benton part A | Local service district | 55 | 50 | +10.0% | 8.52 | 6.5/km^{2} |
| Benton part B | Local service district | 33 | 33 | 0.0% | 3.79 | 8.7/km^{2} |
| Beresford Nord | Local service district | 788 | 806 | −2.2% | 151.68 | 5.2/km^{2} |
| Beresford Sud | Local service district | 1,523 | 1,525 | −0.1% | 239.95 | 6.3/km^{2} |
| Big River | Local service district | 791 | 721 | +9.7% | 21.72 | 36.4/km^{2} |
| Black River-Hardwicke part A | Local service district | 726 | 690 | +5.2% | 157.84 | 4.6/km^{2} |
| Black River-Hardwicke part B | Local service district | 341 | 358 | −4.7% | 64.81 | 5.3/km^{2} |
| Blair Athol | Local service district | 52 | 54 | −3.7% | 5.73 | 9.1/km^{2} |
| Blanchard Settlement | Local service district | 396 | 394 | +0.5% | 28.86 | 13.7/km^{2} |
| Bonny-River - Second Falls | Local service district | 420 | 381 | +10.2% | 169.03 | 2.5/km^{2} |
| Boudreau West | Local service district | 360 | 358 | +0.6% | 4.78 | 75.3/km^{2} |
| Brantville | Local service district | 891 | 903 | −1.3% | 39.46 | 22.6/km^{2} |
| Canton des Basques | Local service district | 319 | 342 | −6.7% | 1.47 | 217.0/km^{2} |
| Cap-Bateau | Local service district | 229 | 262 | −12.6% | 5.28 | 43.4/km^{2} |
| Cap-de-Richiboucto | Local service district | 1,067 | 989 | +7.9% | 62.02 | 17.2/km^{2} |
| Cape Tormentine | Local service district | 97 | 77 | +26.0% | 0.94 | 103.2/km^{2} |
| Carlisle Road | Local service district | 967 | 924 | +4.7% | 4.29 | 225.4/km^{2} |
| Chiasson-Savoy | Local service district | 462 | 456 | +1.3% | 26.93 | 17.2/km^{2} |
| Clair | Former local government | 794 | 781 | +1.7% | 10.49 | 75.7/km^{2} |
| Coldstream | Local service district | 102 | 151 | −32.5% | 4.33 | 23.6/km^{2} |
| Collette | Local service district | 420 | 456 | −7.9% | 61.27 | 6.9/km^{2} |
| Coteau Road | Local service district | 393 | 410 | −4.1% | 14.74 | 26.7/km^{2} |
| Dalhousie Junction | Local service district | 402 | 396 | +1.5% | 16.65 | 24.1/km^{2} |
| Debec | Local service district | 104 | 98 | +6.1% | 0.96 | 108.3/km^{2} |
| Dennis-Weston | Local service district | 970 | 1,023 | −5.2% | 43.57 | 22.3/km^{2} |
| Dugas | Local service district | 67 | 67 | 0.0% | 4.57 | 14.7/km^{2} |
| Dunlop | Local service district | 930 | 950 | −2.1% | 18.29 | 50.8/km^{2} |
| Eel River Crossing | Former local government | 1,082 | 1,157 | −6.5% | 18.92 | 57.2/km^{2} |
| Elgin | Local service district | 213 | 203 | +4.9% | 4.29 | 49.7/km^{2} |
| Escuminac | Local service district | 152 | 166 | −8.4% | 12.47 | 12.2/km^{2} |
| Estey's Bridge | Local service district | 1,908 | 1,766 | +8.0% | 152.05 | 12.5/km^{2} |
| Evangéline | Local service district | 340 | 368 | −7.6% | 6.73 | 50.5/km^{2} |
| Evergreen Park | Local service district | 687 | 674 | +1.9% | 3.31 | 207.6/km^{2} |
| Fair Isle | Local service district | 895 | 936 | −4.4% | 64.44 | 13.9/km^{2} |
| Fairfield | Local service district | 295 | 294 | +0.3% | 25.33 | 11.6/km^{2} |
| Flatlands part A | Local service district | 148 | 143 | +3.5% | 15.71 | 9.4/km^{2} |
| Flatlands part B | Local service district | 5 | 0 | NA | 3.12 | 1.6/km^{2} |
| Fundy Bay | Local service district | 1,236 | 1,167 | +5.9% | 60.19 | 20.5/km^{2} |
| Gauvreau-Petit Tracadie | Local service district | 415 | 413 | +0.5% | 14.97 | 27.7/km^{2} |
| Glassville | Local service district | 77 | 63 | +22.2% | 0.56 | 137.5/km^{2} |
| Glencoe | Local service district | 280 | 207 | +35.3% | 17.58 | 15.9/km^{2} |
| Grand Barachois | Local service district | 3,087 | 2,819 | +9.5% | 38.93 | 79.3/km^{2} |
| Grand Saint-Antoine part A | Local service district | 223 | 230 | −3.0% | 10.16 | 21.9/km^{2} |
| Grand Saint-Antoine part B | Local service district | 161 | 153 | +5.2% | 13.01 | 12.4/km^{2} |
| Grand Saint-Antoine part C | Local service district | 104 | 88 | +18.2% | 8.04 | 12.9/km^{2} |
| Grande-Digue | Local service district | 2,596 | 2,261 | +14.8% | 46.23 | 56.2/km^{2} |
| Greater Lakeburn | Local service district | 1,529 | 1,014 | +50.8% | 23.07 | 66.3/km^{2} |
| Haute Aboujagane | Local service district | 982 | 974 | +0.8% | 77.81 | 12.6/km^{2} |
| Haut-Lamèque | Local service district | 278 | 285 | −2.5% | 8.29 | 33.5/km^{2} |
| Haut-Sheila | Local service district | 729 | 752 | −3.1% | 4.71 | 154.8/km^{2} |
| Haut-Shippagan | Local service district | 265 | 280 | −5.4% | 6.49 | 40.8/km^{2} |
| Havelock Inside | Local service district | 307 | 310 | −1.0% | 10.04 | 30.6/km^{2} |
| Inkerman | Local service district | 712 | 642 | +10.9% | 24.19 | 29.4/km^{2} |
| Inkerman Centre | Local service district | 788 | 816 | −3.4% | 27.58 | 28.6/km^{2} |
| Kedgwick | Retired population centre | 953 | 993 | −4.0% | 4 | 238.3/km^{2} |
| Keswick Ridge | Local service district | 1,643 | 1,652 | −0.5% | 55.16 | 29.8/km^{2} |
| Lakeville | Local service district | 266 | 305 | −12.8% | 33.72 | 7.9/km^{2} |
| Landry Office | Local service district | 403 | 417 | −3.4% | 37.75 | 10.7/km^{2} |
| Laplante | Local service district | 320 | 328 | −2.4% | 7.19 | 44.5/km^{2} |
| Leech | Local service district | 635 | 608 | +4.4% | 79.04 | 8.0/km^{2} |
| Lincoln | Local service district | 2,441 | 2,504 | −2.5% | 25.54 | 95.6/km^{2} |
| Lorne | Local service district | 516 | 600 | −14.0% | 32.83 | 15.7/km^{2} |
| Lower Newcastle-Russellville part B | Local service district | 369 | 352 | +4.8% | 18.77 | 19.7/km^{2} |
| Madran | Local service district | 263 | 260 | +1.2% | 15.23 | 17.3/km^{2} |
| Maltempec | Local service district | 307 | 275 | +11.6% | 13.4 | 22.9/km^{2} |
| Mann Mountain | Local service district | 52 | 51 | +2.0% | 15.41 | 3.4/km^{2} |
| McLeods | Local service district | 383 | 372 | +3.0% | 14.55 | 26.3/km^{2} |
| Menneval | Local service district | 58 | 55 | +5.5% | 29.15 | 2.0/km^{2} |
| Miscou Island | Local service district | 551 | 530 | +4.0% | 62.08 | 8.9/km^{2} |
| Murray Corner | Local service district | 371 | 368 | +0.8% | 87.9 | 4.2/km^{2} |
| Nauwigewauk | Local service district | 1,538 | 1,472 | +4.5% | 30.49 | 50.4/km^{2} |
| Nevers Road | Local service district | 417 | 421 | −1.0% | 1.69 | 246.7/km^{2} |
| New Bandon-Salmon Beach part A | Local service district | 487 | 459 | +6.1% | 191.66 | 2.5/km^{2} |
| New Bandon-Salmon Beach part B | Local service district | 345 | 354 | −2.5% | 154.14 | 2.2/km^{2} |
| Noonan | Local service district | 1,086 | 1,042 | +4.2% | 75.81 | 14.3/km^{2} |
| North Tetagouche | Local service district | 908 | 945 | −3.9% | 22.42 | 40.5/km^{2} |
| Notre-Dame-des-Érables part A | Local service district | 723 | 782 | −7.5% | 78.11 | 9.3/km^{2} |
| Notre-Dame-des-Érables part B | Local service district | 44 | 52 | −15.4% | 11.33 | 3.9/km^{2} |
| Oak Point - Bartibog Bridge | Local service district | 272 | 249 | +9.2% | 20.75 | 13.1/km^{2} |
| Oswald Gray | Local service district | 84 | 103 | −18.4% | 0.19 | 442.1/km^{2} |
| Pepper Creek | Local service district | 772 | 802 | −3.7% | 1.73 | 446.2/km^{2} |
| Petite-Lamèque | Local service district | 356 | 364 | −2.2% | 9.18 | 38.8/km^{2} |
| Petit-Rocher-Nord (Devereaux) | Local service district | 577 | 572 | +0.9% | 8.69 | 66.4/km^{2} |
| Petit-Rocher-Sud | Local service district | 393 | 411 | −4.4% | 2.2 | 178.6/km^{2} |
| Pigeon Hill | Local service district | 436 | 443 | −1.6% | 9.84 | 44.3/km^{2} |
| Point La Nim | Local service district | 247 | 231 | +6.9% | 10.92 | 22.6/km^{2} |
| Pointe de Bute | Local service district | 561 | 571 | −1.8% | 80.17 | 7.0/km^{2} |
| Pointe LaFrance | Local service district | 682 | 708 | −3.7% | 6.69 | 101.9/km^{2} |
| Pointe Sauvage (Indian Point) | Local service district | 74 | 85 | −12.9% | 2.16 | 34.3/km^{2} |
| Pointe-à-Bouleau | Local service district | 199 | 191 | +4.2% | 4.29 | 46.4/km^{2} |
| Pointe-Alexandre | Local service district | 347 | 303 | +14.5% | 6.19 | 56.1/km^{2} |
| Pointe-Brûlée | Local service district | 228 | 221 | +3.2% | 2.08 | 109.6/km^{2} |
| Pointe-Canot | Local service district | 252 | 247 | +2.0% | 3.46 | 72.8/km^{2} |
| Pointe-du-Chêne | Local service district | 767 | 716 | +7.1% | 2.3 | 333.5/km^{2} |
| Pointe-Sapin | Local service district | 475 | 477 | −0.4% | 71.54 | 6.6/km^{2} |
| Poirier | Local service district | 97 | 83 | +16.9% | 7.74 | 12.5/km^{2} |
| Pokemouche | Local service district | 535 | 490 | +9.2% | 22.17 | 24.1/km^{2} |
| Pokesudie | Local service district | 202 | 228 | −11.4% | 13.37 | 15.1/km^{2} |
| Pont Landry part A | Local service district | 679 | 662 | +2.6% | 15.34 | 44.3/km^{2} |
| Pont Landry part B | Local service district | 372 | 402 | −7.5% | 17.02 | 21.9/km^{2} |
| Pont Landry part C | Local service district | 227 | 267 | −15.0% | 9.92 | 22.9/km^{2} |
| Portage River-Tracadie Beach part A | Local service district | 440 | 499 | −11.8% | 15.56 | 28.3/km^{2} |
| Portage River-Tracadie Beach part B | Local service district | 121 | 119 | +1.7% | 2.07 | 58.5/km^{2} |
| Renous-Quarryville part A | Local service district | 710 | 723 | −1.8% | 39.6 | 17.9/km^{2} |
| Renous-Quarryville part B | Local service district | 326 | 306 | +6.5% | 25.62 | 12.7/km^{2} |
| Riley Brook | Local service district | 40 | 71 | −43.7% | 10.76 | 3.7/km^{2} |
| Rivière à la Truite | Local service district | 438 | 387 | +13.2% | 7.04 | 62.2/km^{2} |
| Robertville | Local service district | 969 | 937 | +3.4% | 5.64 | 171.8/km^{2} |
| Rusagonis-Waasis | Local service district | 4,661 | 4,252 | +9.6% | 132.2 | 35.3/km^{2} |
| Saint Irénée and Alderwood | Local service district | 827 | 847 | −2.4% | 63.63 | 13.0/km^{2} |
| Saint-André | Former local government | 371 | 349 | +6.3% | 3.67 | 101.1/km^{2} |
| Saint-André & LeBlanc Office | Local service district | 461 | 459 | +0.4% | 45.86 | 10.1/km^{2} |
| Sainte-Anne-de-Kent part A | Local service district | 941 | 902 | +4.3% | 44.53 | 21.1/km^{2} |
| Sainte-Anne-de-Kent part B | Local service district | 138 | 146 | −5.5% | 13.21 | 10.4/km^{2} |
| Sainte-Rose part A | Local service district | 706 | 744 | −5.1% | 42.45 | 16.6/km^{2} |
| Sainte-Rose part B | Local service district | 15 | 0 | NA | 6.02 | 2.5/km^{2} |
| Saint-François | Former local government | 468 | 470 | −0.4% | 6.17 | 75.9/km^{2} |
| Saint-Hilaire | Former local government | 273 | 252 | +8.3% | 5.69 | 48.0/km^{2} |
| Saint-Ignace | Local service district | 566 | 567 | −0.2% | 31.9 | 17.7/km^{2} |
| Saint-Pons | Local service district | 254 | 319 | −20.4% | 8.49 | 29.9/km^{2} |
| Saint-Sauveur | Local service district | 598 | 673 | −11.1% | 170.34 | 3.5/km^{2} |
| Saumarez | Local service district | 471 | 502 | −6.2% | 3.65 | 129.0/km^{2} |
| Scoudouc part A | Local service district | 1,000 | 1,009 | −0.9% | 52.21 | 19.2/km^{2} |
| Scoudouc part B | Local service district | 101 | 75 | +34.7% | 6.38 | 15.8/km^{2} |
| Scoudouc Road | Local service district | 228 | 193 | +18.1% | 10.71 | 21.3/km^{2} |
| Seigas | Local service district | 185 | 201 | −8.0% | 5.77 | 32.1/km^{2} |
| Shediac Bridge - Shediac River | Local service district | 1,177 | 1,098 | +7.2% | 10.99 | 107.1/km^{2} |
| Shediac Cape | Local service district | 1,062 | 838 | +26.7% | 38.95 | 27.3/km^{2} |
| Somerville | Local service district | 299 | 286 | +4.5% | 1.62 | 184.6/km^{2} |
| St. Margarets | Local service district | 269 | 258 | +4.3% | 56.73 | 4.7/km^{2} |
| St. Martin-de-Restigouche | Local service district | 105 | 92 | +14.1% | 5.77 | 18.2/km^{2} |
| St. Simon | Local service district | 648 | 700 | −7.4% | 18.11 | 35.8/km^{2} |
| St.-Jean Baptiste-de-Restigouche | Local service district | 146 | 161 | −9.3% | 96.01 | 1.5/km^{2} |
| Ste. Cécile | Local service district | 733 | 732 | +0.1% | 18.56 | 39.5/km^{2} |
| Sunny Corner | Local service district | 737 | 789 | −6.6% | 17.65 | 41.8/km^{2} |
| Tabusintac | Local service district | 852 | 861 | −1.0% | 152.13 | 5.6/km^{2} |
| Tracadie | Former local government | 5,349 | 5,171 | +3.4% | 24.65 | 217.0/km^{2} |
| Tremblay | Local service district | 463 | 459 | +0.9% | 6.58 | 70.4/km^{2} |
| Upper and Lower Northampton | Local service district | 348 | 311 | +11.9% | 64.28 | 5.4/km^{2} |
| Upper Kent | Local service district | 106 | 160 | −33.7% | 0.65 | 163.1/km^{2} |
| Upper Portage River | Local service district | 656 | 668 | −1.8% | 8.47 | 77.4/km^{2} |
| Val-Comeau part A | Local service district | 745 | 770 | −3.2% | 6.22 | 119.8/km^{2} |
| Val Comeau part B | Local service district | 0 | 0 | NA | 1.94 | 0.0/km^{2} |
| Western Charlotte part A | Local service district | 373 | 435 | −14.3% | 162.01 | 2.3/km^{2} |
| Western Charlotte part B | Local service district | 478 | 534 | −10.5% | 28.93 | 16.5/km^{2} |
| Westfield East | Local service district | 657 | 600 | +9.5% | 60.78 | 10.8/km^{2} |
| White's Brook | Local service district | 104 | 96 | +8.3% | 29.35 | 3.5/km^{2} |
| Wirral-Enniskillen | Local service district | 226 | 204 | +10.8% | 29.3 | 7.7/km^{2} |
| Total designated places | — | 93,925 | 92,031 | +2.1% | 5,101.42 | 18.4/km^{2} |
| Province of New Brunswick | — | 775,610 | 747,101 | +3.8% | 71,248.50 | 10.9/km^{2} |

== See also ==
- List of census agglomerations in Atlantic Canada
- List of local service districts in New Brunswick
- List of population centres in New Brunswick
