= List of local service districts in New Brunswick =

The Canadian province of New Brunswick contained 236 local service districts prior to governance reforms in 2023; another 80 former LSDs were previously dissolved or incorporated.

Reforms to New Brunswick's local governance system on 1 January 2023 abolished local service districts.

== List of service districts on 31 December 2022 ==
Provincial government guidelines required capitalising the word parish only if it followed the specific part of the name: e.g. Flatlands Local Service District but the local service district of Flatlands.

Changes in 2023 have been noted; the percentages given in the report refer to LSDs' population according to the original report, not their land area. Maps were not finalised until the appropriate Regulation is released; there were differences between maps released in March and the original boundary proposals. Because property and survey lines were the basis for the new boundaries, small adjustments were too common to list.

Names for the new municipal entities and rural districts were released on 24 May 2022.

Existing local service districts when dissolved by 2023 local governance reform
Official name (Note: French names usually differ only in using "la paroisse de" instead of "the parish of"; other differences are noted. Spellings used are those in Regulation 84-168; these sometimes vary from the spellings used in other Acts and Regulations or colloquial usage.)	County	Parish	Established	2023 reform
The parish of Aberdeen	Carleton		1966-11-23	District of Carleton North
The parish of Acadieville	Kent		1966-11-23	Nouvelle-Arcadie
The parish of Addington	Restigouche		1966-11-23	Campbellton (small areas west and southwest of Glencoe); Restigouche rural district (unpopulated interior)
Aldouane	Kent	Saint-Charles	1980-09-24	Beaurivage
Allardville	Gloucester	Allardville; Bathurst	1999-10-14	Chaleur rural district
The parish of Alma	Albert		1973-11-01	Fundy Albert (Fundy National Park); Southeast rural district (remainder)
The parish of Alnwick	Northumberland		1968-06-27	Alnwick
The parish of Andover	Victoria		1966-11-23	Regional Community of Southern Victoria (Hillandale and area to north); Western Valley rural district (area south and west of Hillandale)
Anse-Bleue (French: Anse Bleue)	Gloucester	New Bandon	1968-07-17	Rivière-du-Nord
Baie du Petit Pokemouche	Gloucester	Shippegan	1980-09-16	Shippagan
Baie Ste. Anne (French: Baie-Sainte-Anne)	Northumberland	Hardwicke	1967-12-06	Kent rural district
Baie-Verte	Westmorland	Westmorland	1974-09-11	Strait Shores
The parish of Balmoral	Restigouche		1966-11-23	Bois-Joli (Boissonault, Drapeau, and Saint-Maure Roads); Campbellton (area on southern side of McAbbie Road); Heron Bay (areas along eastern border); Restigouche rural district (unpopulated interior)
Balmoral-St. Maure	Restigouche	Balmoral	1968-01-31	Bois-Joli
The parish of Bathurst	Gloucester		1969-09-24	City of Bathurst (Chamberlain Settlement, Gloucester Junction, area north of Goodwins Mill); Belle-Baie (Dunlop area); Chaleur rural district (remainder)
Bayfield	Westmorland	Botsford	1973-07-18	Strait Shores
Bayside	Charlotte	Saint Croix	1985-06-03	Town of Saint Andrews
Beaver Harbour	Charlotte	Pennfield	1971-02-17	Eastern Charlotte
Benton	Carleton, York	Richmond, Woodstock, Canterbury (Note: Extension into this county or parish not explicitly stated.)	1967-10-30	Municipality of Lakeland Ridges
The parish of Beresford	Gloucester		1969-09-24	Belle-Baie (populated area); Chaleur rural district (interior)
Big River	Gloucester	Bathurst	1989-12-22	City of Bathurst (Big River and Rough Waters); Chaleur rural district (south of Big River)
Black River-Hardwicke	Northumberland	Glenelg, Hardwicke	1971-10-18	Greater Miramichi rural district
The parish of Blackville	Northumberland		1968-06-27	Miramichi River Valley (north of community of Cains River); Greater Miramichi rural district (Cains River and Crown lands along western border of parish)
Blair Athol	Restigouche	Balmoral	1983-11-28	Bois-Joli
Blanchard Settlement	Gloucester	Caraquet	1987-08-04	Caraquet
The parish of Blissfield	Northumberland		1968-06-27	Village of Doaktown (populated area); Greater Miramichi rural district (Crown lands)
The parish of Blissville	Sunbury		1966-11-23	Capital Region rural district
The parish of Botsford	Westmorland		1966-11-23	Strait Shores
The parish of Bright	York		1966-11-23	Central York (populated area except Howland Ridge); Nackawic-Millville (Howland Ridge area); Hartland (Becaguimec South Branch Road); Capital Region rural district (remainder)
The parish of Brighton	Carleton		1966-11-23	Hartland
The parish of Brunswick	Queens		1968-06-27	Butternut Valley (populated area); Kings rural district (interior)
The parish of Burton (Note: Burton's LSDAC calls itself the Burton-Greater Geary Local Service District Advisory Committee)	Sunbury		1966-11-23	Capital Region rural district
The parish of Cambridge	Queens		1968-06-27	Arcadia
The parish of Canning	Queens		1966-11-23	Arcadia (along Route 695); Municipality of Grand Lake (most); Capital Region rural district (Clarks Corner, Douglas Harbour, areas to southwest)
The parish of Canterbury	York		1966-11-23	Municipality of Lakeland Ridges
Cap-Bateau (French: Cap-Bâteau)	Gloucester	Shippegan	1987-04-21	Île-de-Lamèque
Cap-de-Richibouctou	Kent	Richibucto	1973-07-18	Five Rivers (small areas on southern edge); Kent rural district (most)
Cape Tormentine (French: Cap Tormentin)	Westmorland	Botsford	1972-11-08	Strait Shores
The parish of Caraquet	Gloucester		1968-06-27	Caraquet (most); Municipalité des Hautes-Terres (Maltampec Road and areas west); Shippagan (small area, possibly error)
The parish of Cardwell	Kings		1968-06-27	The Community of Three Rivers (small area near Upper Goshen); Kings rural district (most)
The parish of Carleton	Kent		1966-11-23	Beaurivage (Route 480, west of Route 11); Kent rural district
Chaleur	Restigouche	Colborne, Durham	1996-12-10	Heron Bay (Benjamin River, Blackland, New Mills, area south of Charlo, and Heron Island); Restigouche rural district (Black Point, Gravel Hill, Nash Creek, interior)
Chamcook	Charlotte	Saint Andrews	1997-07-29	Town of Saint Andrews
The parish of Chatham	Northumberland		1967-12-20	Greater Miramichi rural district
Chiasson-Savoy	Gloucester	Shippegan	1970-04-29	Île-de-Lamèque
The parish of Chipman	Queens		1966-11-23	Municipality of Grand Lake (populated area); Capital Region rural district (remainder)
The parish of Clarendon	Charlotte		1975-01-15	Capital Region rural district
the local service district of Coldstream	Carleton	Brighton	1970-10-14	Hartland
Collette	Northumberland	Rogersville	1983-12-20	Nouvelle-Arcadie
Coteau Road (French: Chemin Coteau)	Gloucester	Shippegan	1987-08-04	Île-de-Lamèque
The parish of Coverdale	Albert		1966-11-23	Fundy Albert (along Petitcodiac River south of Riverview); Salisbury (Colpitts Settlement and west of Riverview); Southeast rural district (remainder)
The parish of Dalhousie	Restigouche		1966-11-23	Bois-Joli (eastern portion southwest of railway); Campbellton (portion west of Eel River Crossing); Heron Bay (eastern portion northwest of railway, islands)
Dalhousie Junction	Restigouche	Dalhousie	1968-06-19	Heron Bay
Debec Consolidated School District (French: le district scolaire consolidé de Debec)	Carleton	Richmond, Woodstock	1966-11-23	Municipality of Lakeland Ridges (most); Woodstock (Beardsley area, Dugan Road)
The parish of Denmark	Victoria		1966-11-23	Western Valley rural district
Dennis-Weston	Charlotte	Saint Stephen	1988-11-02	Municipal District of St. Stephen
The parish of Derby	Northumberland		1967-12-20	Miramichi River Valley
The parish of Dorchester	Westmorland		1966-11-23	Tantramar (portion east of Memramcook River and south of Memramcook); Southeast rural district (remainder)
The parish of Douglas	York		1966-11-23	Central York (Dorn Ridge Road and areas south of Hamtown and west of Carlisle Road); Fredericton (Carlisle Road and area north to Claudie Road, Lower Douglas, Saint John River islands); Nashwaak (populated area north from Hamtown Corner); Capital Region rural district (interior)
The parish of Drummond	Victoria		1966-11-23	Grand Falls (populated area); Vallée-des-Rivières (area along northern side of Route 17 on western border); Northwest rural district (interior)
The parish of Dufferin	Charlotte		1969-02-19	Municipal District of St. Stephen
Dugas	Gloucester	New Bandon	1979-05-17	Rivière-du-Nord
The parish of Dumbarton	Charlotte		1969-02-19	Southwest rural district
The parish of Dumfries	York		1966-11-23	Harvey (area between Magaguadavic Lake and Mud Lake); Nackawic-Millville (inland along Allandale Road and along Saint John River); Capital Region rural district (interior)
The parish of Dundas	Kent		1966-11-23	Beausoleil (Notre-Dame, MacDougall Settlement); Champdoré (Saint-Antoine Sud, east of Grand Saint-Antoine); Maple Hills (Dundas, Trafalgar Road)
Dunlop	Gloucester	Beresford, Bathurst	1987-12-18	Belle-Baie
The parish of Eldon	Restigouche		1966-11-23	Kedgwick (Adams Gulch and Wyers Brook); Restigouche rural district (remainder)
Elgin	Albert	Elgin	1968-02-07	The Community of Three Rivers
The parish of Elgin	Albert		1966-11-23	Salisbury (Little River); The Community of Three Rivers (populated area except Little River); Southeast rural district (remainder)
Escuminac	Northumberland	Hardwicke	1969-01-29	Greater Miramichi rural district
Estey's Bridge	York	Douglas	1987-06-30	Central York (most); Fredericton (Killarney Road, Lakeside Estates, McLeod Hill); Nashwaak (Hamtown Corner)
Evangéline (French: Évangéline)	Gloucester	Inkerman	1988-03-22	Caraquet (most); Shippagan (small area on southeastern border)
Fair Isle	Northumberland	Alnwick	1987-04-21	Alnwick
Fairfield	Saint John	Simonds	1974-10-09	Fundy-St. Martins
Flatlands	Restigouche	Addington, Eldon	1966-11-23	Restigouche rural district
the local service district of Fundy Bay	Charlotte	Saint George	1978-05-24	Eastern Charlotte
The parish of Gladstone	Sunbury		1966-11-23	Sunbury-York South (Mersereau Lake Road); Capital Region rural district (remainder)
Glassville	Carleton	Aberdeen	1974-12-28	District of Carleton North
Glencoe	Restigouche	Addington	1977-09-21	Campbellton
The parish of Glenelg	Northumberland		1967-12-20	Greater Miramichi rural district
The parish of Gordon	Victoria		1966-11-23	District of Tobique Valley (populated area); Western Valley rural district (interior)
Grande-Digue	Kent, Westmorland	Dundas, Shediac	1991-05-16	Beausoleil
The parish of Grand Falls (French: la paroisse de Grand-Sault)	Victoria		1966-11-23	Grand Falls
Grand Saint-Antoine	Kent	Dundas, Sainte-Marie, Wellington	1981-09-17	Champdoré
The parish of Greenwich	Kings		1976-12-15	Fundy rural district
The parish of Hammond	Kings		1968-06-27	Kings rural district
Hampstead	Queens	Hampstead	1981-12-17	Arcadia
The parish of Hampton	Kings		1968-06-27	Hampton
The parish of Harcourt	Kent	Harcourt, Huskisson	1966-11-23	Champdoré (Birch Ridge area); Five Rivers (Adamsville, Coal Branch, Harcourt); Grand Lake (western populated area along Route 116); Nouvelle-Arcadie (northern and eastern Huskisson Parish); Kent rural district (interior)
The parish of Hardwicke	Northumberland		1968-06-27	Greater Miramichi rural district (mainland west of Eel River region, islands); Kent rural district (Eel River region and mainland to east)
The parish of Harvey	Albert		1966-11-23	Fundy Albert (most); Southeast rural district (interior)
Haut-Lamèque	Gloucester	Shippegan	1977-05-18	Île-de-Lamèque
Haut-Shippagan	Gloucester	Shippegan	1988-03-22	Shippagan
The parish of Havelock	Kings		1968-06-27	Butternut Valley (most); Kings rural district (small border areas)
The parish of Hillsborough	Albert		1966-11-23	Fundy Albert (most); Southeast rural district (Crown lands along inland borders)
The parish of Hopewell	Albert		1966-11-23	Fundy Albert (most); Southeast rural district (Caledonia Gorge area)
Inkerman Centre	Gloucester	Caraquet, Inkerman	1970-02-25	Shippagan
The parish of Johnston	Queens		1968-06-27	Butternut Valley (populated area except Kelly Road); Kings rural district (Kelly Road and interior)
The parish of Kars	Kings		1968-06-27	Valley Waters
The parish of Kent	Carleton		1966-11-23	District of Carleton North (populated area); Western Valley rural district (interior)
the local service district of Keswick Ridge	York	Bright	1974-02-27	Central York
The parish of Kingsclear	York		1966-11-23	Central York (Saint John River islands); Harvey (New Market and Smithfield); Hanwell (remainder)
The parish of Kingston	Kings		1968-06-27	Hampton (along Route 845 from Lower Norton); Fundy rural district (remainder)
Lakeville	Carleton	Wakefield, Wilmot	1985-06-03	District of Carleton North
Landry Office	Gloucester	Inkerman	1988-03-22	Caraquet
Laplante	Gloucester	Beresford	1980-09-16	Belle-Baie
The parish of Lepreau	Charlotte		1970-06-03	Fundy Shores (south); Southwest rural district (interior)
The parish of Lincoln	Sunbury		1966-11-23	Fredericton (Fredericton Airport and corridor along highway); Oromocto (remainder)
Lorne	Restigouche	Colborne, Durham	1994-09-16	Restigouche rural district
The parish of Lorne	Victoria		1966-11-23	District of Tobique Valley (populated area); Western Valley rural district (remainder)
Lower Newcastle-Russellville	Northumberland	Newcastle	1989-09-01	Greater Miramichi rural district (Note: listed as Ferry Road-Russellville)
The parish of Madawaska	Madawaska		1966-11-23	Northwest rural district
Madran	Gloucester	Beresford	1991-05-07	Belle-Baie
Maltempec	Gloucester	Inkerman	1987-08-04	Municipalité des Hautes-Terres
Mann Mountain	Restigouche	Eldon	1975-04-09	Restigouche rural district
The parish of Manners Sutton	York		1966-11-23	Harvey (populated area except Flume Ridge Road); Capital Region rural district (remainder)
The parish of Maugerville	Sunbury		1966-11-23	Capital Region rural district
The parish of McAdam	York		1973-11-01	Southwest rural district
McLeods	Restigouche	Dalhousie	1969-09-03	Bois-Joli (small area west of Route 280); Campbellton (remainder)
Miscou Island (French: île de Miscou [sic])	Gloucester	Shippegan	1980-09-16	Acadian Peninsula rural district
The parish of Moncton	Westmorland		1966-11-23	Beausoleil (MacDougall Settlement); Dieppe (Greater Lakeburn, Calhoun Road); Maple Hills (most of populated area); Moncton (Charles Lutes Road, Zack Road); Salisbury (Salisbury River and along Homestead Road west of Steeves Mountain); Southeast rural district (northwestern corner)
Murray Corner	Westmorland	Botsford	1984-05-16	Strait Shores
The parish of Musquash	Saint John		1985-06-03	Fundy Shores
The parish of Nelson	Northumberland		1967-12-20	Miramichi (upriver to North Barnaby Road, Old Track Road and part of Route 126); Miramichi River Valley (Quarryville Road and areas along southwestern border); Nouvelle-Arcadie (Murray Settlement area and border areas); Greater Miramichi rural district (remainder)
The parish of New Bandon	Gloucester		1969-09-24	Rivière-du-Nord (Boudreau Road and area north of Bertrand); Chaleur rural district (most); Acadian Peninsula rural district (may be erroneous)
New Bandon-Salmon Beach	Gloucester	Bathurst, New Bandon	1976-11-03	The City of Bathurst (area northeast of Route 134); Chaleur rural district (remainder)
The parish of New Maryland	York		1966-11-23	Harvey (South Oromocto Lake and Route 645); Sunbury-York South (Beaver Dam, Charters Settlement, Nasonworth); Capital Region rural district (interior)
The parish of Newcastle	Northumberland		1967-12-20	Miramichi River Valley (Chaplin Island Road area); Miramichi (border city along Beaverbrook Road, O'Keefe Road, and Route 430); Greater Miramichi rural district (remainder)
Noonan	Sunbury	Maugerville	1988-03-22	Capital Region rural district
The parish of North Esk	Northumberland	Northesk	1968-06-27	Miramichi River Valley (along river, Chaplin Island Road, Maple Glen); Greater Miramichi rural district (interior)
The parish of North Lake	York		1966-11-23	Municipality of Lakeland Ridges
North Tetagouche	Gloucester	Bathurst	1987-04-21	City of Bathurst (most); Belle-Baie(small area on southern edge of Dunlop)
The parish of Northampton	Carleton		1966-11-23	Woodstock
The parish of Northfield	Sunbury		1966-11-23	Municipality of Grand Lake (populated area); Capital Region rural district (interior)
The parish of Norton	Kings		1968-06-27	Valley Waters (Bloomfield, Bloomfield Ridge, Bloomfield Station, Dickie Mountain); Hampton (Central Norton, Lower Norton, Passekeag); Fundy rural district (easternmost corner)
The parish of Notre-Dame-de-Lourdes	Madawaska		1966-11-23	Vallée-des-Rivières (populated area); Northwest rural district (interior)
Oak Point - Bartibog Bridge	Northumberland	Alnwick	1970-10-22	Alnwick
The parish of Paquetville	Gloucester		1969-09-24	Municipalité des Hautes-Terres
the Paroisse Notre-Dame-des-Érables	Gloucester	New Bandon, Paquetville	1986-01-10	Municipalité des Hautes-Terres
The parish of Peel	Carleton		1966-11-23	District of Carleton North (most); Hartland (community of Peel)
The parish of Pennfield	Charlotte		1970-06-03	Eastern Charlotte (populated area except Route 780); Southwest rural district (Route 780, interior)
The parish of Perth	Victoria		1966-11-23	Regional Community of Southern Victoria (Tobique River downstream to Inman); Western Valley rural district (remainder)
The parish of Petersville	Queens		1973-03-14	Fundy rural district
Petite-Lamèque	Gloucester	Shippegan	1970-04-29	Île-de-Lamèque
Petit-Rocher-Nord (Devereaux)	Gloucester	Beresford	1978-06-14	Belle-Baie
Petit-Rocher-Sud (French: Petit-Rocher-sud)	Gloucester	Beresford	1969-02-05	Belle-Baie
Pigeon Hill	Gloucester	Shippegan	1987-08-04	Île-de-Lamèque
Pointe-Alexandre	Gloucester	Shippegan	1989-12-22	Île-de-Lamèque
Pointe-Canot	Gloucester	Shippegan	1987-04-21	Île-de-Lamèque
Pointe de Bute	Westmorland	Westmorland	1984-01-01	Tantramar (most); Southeast rural district (small area in northern corner)
Pointe-du-Chêne	Westmorland	Shediac	1971-11-03	Shediac
Point La Nim (French: Pointe La Nim)	Restigouche	Dalhousie	1977-06-08	Heron Bay
Pointe-Sapin	Kent	Carleton	1970-05-06	Kent rural district
Pointe-Sauvage (Indian Point)	Gloucester	Shippegan	1974-10-16	Shippagan
Poirier	Gloucester	New Bandon	1987-04-21	Rivière-du-Nord
Pokemouche	Gloucester	Inkerman	1987-08-04	Caraquet
Pokesudie	Gloucester	Caraquet	1988-03-22	Caraquet
The parish of Prince William	York		1966-11-23	Harvey (most); Capital Region rural district (west of Magaguadavic Lake)
The parish of Queensbury	York		1966-11-23	Central York (Lower Queensbury, Scotch Lake, Upper Hainesville); Nackawic-Millville (remainder)
Renous-Quarryville	Northumberland	Blackville, Derby	1970-02-11	Miramichi River Valley
The parish of Richibucto (French: la paroisse de Richibouctou)	Kent		1966-11-23	Beaurivage (Crown land north of railway); Five Rivers (most); Grand-Bouctouche (border areas and northwest of Service Road)
The parish of Richmond	Carleton		1966-11-23	Woodstock
Riley Brook	Victoria	Lorne	1969-09-10	District of Tobique Valley
The parish of Rivière-Verte	Madawaska		1973-11-01	Vallée-des-Rivières (small border area along Montagne-de-la-Croix Road); Northwest rural district (most)
Robertville	Gloucester	Beresford	1970-03-25	Belle-Baie
The parish of Rogersville	Northumberland		1967-12-20	Nouvelle-Arcadie
The parish of Rothesay	Kings		1968-06-27	Fundy rural district
Rusagonis-Waasis	Sunbury	Lincoln	1987-08-14	Fredericton (area between Highways 2 and 7); Sunbury-York South (most); Capital Region rural district (areas on southern border and southwestern corner)
The parish of Sackville	Westmorland		1966-11-23	Tantramar (populated area); Southeast rural district (northeastern and northwestern corners)
The parish of Sainte-Anne	Madawaska		1966-11-23	Vallée-des-Rivières (populated area); Northwest rural district (interior)
Sainte-Anne-de-Kent	Kent	Richibucto, Wellington	1971-11-24	Grand-Bouctouche
The parish of Saint-Basile	Madawaska		1966-11-23	Northwest rural district
Ste. Cecile (French: Ste-Cécile)	Gloucester	Shippegan	1972-12-13	Île-de-Lamèque
The parish of Saint-Charles	Kent		1966-11-23	Beaurivage
The parish of Saint Croix	Charlotte		1970-06-03	Municipal District of St. Stephen (Board Road); Southwest rural district (remainder)
The parish of Saint David	Charlotte		1969-02-19	Municipal District of St. Stephen (Saint David Ridge, Sawyer Road and areas); Southwest rural district (north)
The parish of Saint George	Charlotte		1970-06-03	Eastern Charlotte (Lee Settlement and south except Red Rock Road); Southwest rural district (remainder)
Saint-Ignace	Kent	Saint-Louis	1991-04-30	Beaurivage
The parish of Saint-Isidore	Gloucester	Saint-Isidore, Paquetville	1968-06-27	Municipalité des Hautes-Terres
The parish of Saint-Jacques	Madawaska		1966-11-23	Edmundston (Madawaska River grants from Edmundston to provincial border); Northwest rural district (remainder)
The parish of Saint James	Charlotte		1969-02-19	Municipal District of St. Stephen (small border areas); Southwest rural district (remainder)
St. Jean Baptiste – Menneval (Note: Menneval and St. Jean Baptiste de Restigouche formed a joint advisory council five years before their legal merger.)	Restigouche	Eldon	2019-06-01	Kedgwick
The parish of Saint-Joseph	Madawaska		1966-11-23	Edmundston (block on eastern bank of Iroquois River along Couturier and Deuxième Sault Roads); Northwest rural district (remainder)
The parish of Saint-Léonard	Madawaska		1966-11-23	Vallée-des-Rivières (populated area); Northwest rural district (interior and corner southeast of Route 17)
The parish of Saint-Louis	Kent		1966-11-23	Beaurivage (most); Nouvelle-Arcadie (western gore); Kent rural district (Kouchibouguac National Park)
St. Margarets	Northumberland	Glenelg	1985-03-15	Greater Miramichi rural district
St. Martin de Restigouche (French: St-Martin-de-Restigouche)	Restigouche	Saint-Quentin	1968-06-27	Saint-Quentin
The parish of Saint Martins	Saint John		1966-11-23	Fundy-St. Martins (Little River and west); Fundy rural district (remainder)
The parish of Saint Mary (French: la paroisse de Sainte-Marie)	Kent	Sainte-Marie	1966-11-23	Champdoré (most); Grand-Bouctouche (small area near McDonald Road)
The parish of Saint Marys	York		1966-11-23	Fredericton (Evergreen Park, Pepper Creek, Richibucto Road); Nashwaak (populated area north of Fredericton); Capital Region rural district (east)
The parish of Saint Patrick	Charlotte		1970-06-03	Eastern Charlotte (Bethel, Digdeguash, southern Route 760); Southwest rural district (remainder)
The parish of Saint-Paul	Kent		1966-11-23	Champdoré (most); Five Rivers (northern edge, near Clairville and Coal Branch); Maple Hills (Dundas)
The parish of Saint-Quentin	Restigouche		1966-11-23	Kedgwick (area south of Petit-Ouest Road); Saint-Quentin (populated area surrounding town); Northwest rural district
Saint-Sauveur	Gloucester	Allardville	1985-06-03	Municipalité des Hautes-Terres
St. Simon (French: St-Simon)	Gloucester	Caraquet	1971-09-22	Caraquet
The parish of Saint Stephen	Charlotte		1969-02-19	Municipal District of St. Stephen
The parish of Salisbury	Westmorland		1966-11-23	Salisbury (Lewis Mountain, Monteagle, River Glade, Second North River, The Glades); The Community of Three Rivers (Harewood and remainder of south); Southeast rural district (north)
Scoudouc	Westmorland	Shediac, Moncton	1987-11-30	Dieppe (Calhoun Road area); Shediac (remainder)
Scoudouc Road	Westmorland	Shediac	1987-08-04	Shediac
The parish of Shediac	Westmorland		1966-11-23	Beausoleil (MacDougall Settlement); Maple Hills (Saint-Philippe)
Shediac Bridge-Shediac River (French: Shediac Bridge – Shediac River)	Westmorland, Kent	Shediac, Dundas	1988-03-22	Beausoleil
Shediac Cape	Westmorland	Shediac	1987-04-21	Shediac
The parish of Sheffield	Sunbury		1966-11-23	Municipality of Grand Lake (Albrights Corner, New Zion, Ripples); Capital Region rural district (remainder)
The parish of Shippegan	Gloucester		1968-06-27	Île-de-Lamèque (areas on Lamèque Island); Shippagan (mainland, William Island, tidal islands in Baie du Petit-Pokemouche); Acadian Peninsula rural district (Miscou Island, minor islands)
The parish of Simonds	Carleton		1966-11-23	Hartland (St. Thomas, Simonds); District of Carleton North (remainder)
The parish of Simonds	Saint John		1976-10-13	Fundy-St. Martins (most); Fundy rural district (Sands Road and Upper Golden Grove Road)
Somerville	Carleton	Wakefield	1971-10-13	Hartland
The parish of South Esk	Northumberland	Southesk	1968-06-27	Miramichi River Valley (Little Southwest Miramichi River from Dennis down, all areas to east); Greater Miramichi rural district (remainder)
The parish of Southampton	York		1966-11-23	Nackawic-Millville (most); Woodstock (small areas on western border); Capital Region rural district (small areas on northeastern border)
The parish of Springfield	Kings		1968-06-27	Valley Waters
The parish of Stanley	York		1966-11-23	Nashwaak (Green Hill, Maple Grove, and to south); Capital Region rural district (Maple Grove Station, remainder of southern portion, northern portion)
The parish of Studholm	Kings		1968-06-27	Butternut Valley
Sunny Corner	Northumberland	Northesk	1980-08-14	Miramichi River Valley
The parish of Sussex	Kings		1968-06-27	Sussex (small areas along Cumberland Road and west of Church Avenue); Kings rural district (remainder)
Tabusintac	Northumberland	Alnwick	1968-05-01	Alnwick
Tremblay	Gloucester	Beresford	1972-08-16	Belle-Baie
The parish of Upham	Kings		1967-07-01	Hampton (Barnesville, Titusville, Upham); Valley Waters (Cassidy Lake, Clover Hill, Salt Springs); Kings rural district (remainder)
Upper and Lower Northampton	Carleton	Northampton	1987-08-04	Woodstock
Upper Gagetown	Queens	Gagetown	1968-07-30	Arcadia
Upper Kent (French: Haut-Kent)	Carleton	Kent	1968-06-27	District of Carleton North
The parish of Wakefield	Carleton		1966-11-23	Hartland (Wakefield Outside taxing authority); Woodstock (Wakefield Inside taxing authority)
The parish of Waterborough	Queens		1966-11-23	Arcadia (populated area); Capital Region rural district (remainder)
The parish of Waterford	Kings		1968-06-27	Kings rural district
The parish of Weldford	Kent		1966-11-23	Champdoré (small border areas); Five Rivers (most); Nouvelle-Arcadie (Kent Junction)
The parish of Wellington	Kent		1966-11-23	Beausoleil (two small areas along Route 134 on border of Cocagne); Champdoré (McKees Mills and roads to Saint-Antoine); Grand-Bouctouche (most)
The parish of West Isles	Charlotte		1970-06-03	Southwest rural district
Western Charlotte	Charlotte	Saint James, Saint Stephen	1988-11-02	Municipal District of St. Stephen (Little Ridge and south from junction of Route 735 and Mill Road); Southwest rural district (remainder)
The parish of Westfield (Note: The advisory committee for the parish of Westfield is often referred to as serving Westfield West; it is unclear if there is a separate Westfield East committee serving the Kingston Peninsula and Kennebecasis Island portions of the parish.)	Kings		1972-12-13	Grand Bay-Westfield (Brittain Road, Campbell Road); Fundy rural district (remainder)
The parish of Westmorland	Westmorland		1966-11-23	Strait Shores (Coburg Road, Route 16); Southeast rural district (interior)
White Head Island	Charlotte	Grand Manan	1979-10-17	Southwest rural district
White's Brook	Restigouche	Eldon, Grimmer	1986-03-14	Kedgwick
The parish of Wickham	Queens		1968-06-27	Valley Waters
The parish of Wicklow	Carleton		1966-11-23	District of Carleton North
The parish of Wilmot	Carleton		1966-11-23	District of Carleton North
Wirral-Enniskillen	Queens	Petersville	1968-02-29	Capital Region rural district
The parish of Woodstock	Carleton	Richmond, (Note: The extension of the parish of Woodstock into Richmond Parish occurred when the town of Woodstock was enlarged and the boundary description of the parish of Woodstock was replaced by a map that shows ignorance of the southern boundary between Richmond Parish and Woodstock Parish; this is not the first time an error has occurred when a map replaced a written boundary description in an amendment of Regulation 84-168) Woodstock	1966-11-23	Municipality of Lakeland Ridges (south from Critter Road and Punkin Road); Woodstock (remainder)

== Former local service districts ==
Former local service districts, as of 1 July 2017
Official name	County	Parish	Established	Repealed	Current status
The parish of Allardville	Gloucester		1969-09-24	1999-10-14	part of LSD Allardville
Allardville Centre (French: Allardville-centre)	Gloucester	Allardville	1970-11-24	1999-10-14	part of LSD Allardville
Armstrong Brook	Restigouche	Durham	1985-06-03	1994-01-01	annexed by Belledune
The parish of Baker Brook	Madawaska		1966-11-23	2017-07-01	part of rural community of Haut-Madawaska
Barsa Subdivision (French: lotissement Barsa)	Kings	Rothesay	1973-10-10	1998-01-01	annexed by Rothesay
Benoit	Gloucester	Saumarez	1985-03-15	2014-07-01	part of Regional Municipality of Tracadie
Boudreau West (French: Boudreau ouest)	Westmorland	Shediac	1989-09-07	1995-05-08	part of rural community of Beaubassin East
Brantville	Northumberland	Alnwick	1984-01-01	2014-07-01	part of Regional Municipality of Tracadie
Breau Creek	Westmorland	Dorchester	1978-09-06	1995-05-08	annexed by Memramcook
The parish of Campobello	Charlotte		1969-02-19	2010-08-31	incorporated as rural community of Campobello Island
School district No. 9 in the parish of Canning	Queens	Canning	1966-11-23	1967-12-20	annexed by Minto
the local service district of Castalia	Charlotte	Grand Manan	1969-01-15	1995-05-08	annexed by village of Grand Manan
Chatham Head	Northumberland	Chatham	1973-08-15	1995-01-01	annexed by Miramichi
The parish of Clair	Madawaska		1966-11-23	2017-07-01	part of rural community of Haut-Madawaska
Cocagne	Kent	Dundas, Wellington	1988-03-22	2014-05-23	incorporated as rural community of Cocagne
The parish of Colborne	Restigouche		1973-11-01	1996-12-10	part of LSD Chaleur
Cormier's Cove (French: Cormier Cove)	Westmorland	Dorchester	1980-10-23	1995-05-08	annexed by Memramcook
Darlington	Restigouche	Dalhousie	1966-11-23	1977-06-08	incorporated as a village, later annexed by Dalhousie
Douglasfield	Northumberland	Chatham, Glenelg	1975-05-07	1995-01-01	annexed by Miramichi
Dover-Fox Creek	Westmorland	Dorchester, Moncton	1972-08-30	1973-07-09	annexed by Dieppe
Dundee	Restigouche	Dalhousie	1968-01-31	2015-09-01	annexed by Eel River Crossing
The parish of Durham	Restigouche		1966-11-23	1996-12-10	part of LSD Chaleur
Garden Creek	York	Kingsclear	1966-11-23	1973-11-01	part annexed by Fredericton, remainder added to LSD the parish of Kingsclear; part later included in the local service district of Hanwell
Gauvreau-Petit Tracadie	Gloucester	Saumarez	1989-09-07	2014-07-01	part of Regional Municipality of Tracadie
Grand Barachois	Westmorland	Shediac	1990-06-29	1995-05-08	part of rural community of Beaubassin East
The parish of Grimmer	Restigouche		1966-11-23	2012-07-01	merged with village of Kedgwick to form rural community of Kedgwick
the local service district of Hanwell	York	Kingsclear	1974-11-20	2014-05-23	incorporated as rural community of Hanwell
Haute-Aboujagane	Westmorland	Shediac	1986-01-10	1995-05-08	part of rural community of Beaubassin East
Haut Pointe Verte	Gloucester	Beresford	1971-11-24	1977-08-10	annexed by Pointe-Verte
Haut-Sheila	Gloucester	Saumarez	1983-11-28	2014-07-01	part of Regional Municipality of Tracadie
The parish of Inkerman	Gloucester		1968-06-27	2014-07-01	part of Regional Municipality of Tracadie
The parish of Lac Baker	Madawaska		1966-11-23	2017-07-01	part of rural community of Haut-Madawaska
La Hêtrière-McGinley Corner	Westmorland	Dorchester	1974-04-24	1995-05-08	annexed by Memramcook
Lakeview	Westmorland	Sackville	1968-11-27	1978-09-06	annexed by Sackville
Leech	Gloucester	Saumarez	1987-04-21	2014-07-01	part of Regional Municipality of Tracadie
LeGoulet	Gloucester	Shippegan	1967-08-30	1986-05-12	most incorporated as village of Le Goulet; excluded areas now part of LSD Baie du Petit Pokemouche (Note: When Baie du Petit Pokemouche was established its eastern boundary overlapped with LeGoulet. When LeGoulet was incorporated as a village its western boundary was updated, leaving a small gore out of both. The map released for the Shippagan-Sur-Mer in 2012 finally clarified the east boundary of Baie du Petit Pokemouche.) and LSD The parish of Shippegan
Parish of Ludlow	Northumberland	Ludlow	1968-06-27	1971-03-10	included in LSD Upper Miramichi, which later became the rural community of Upper Miramichi
Maisonnette	Gloucester	New Bandon	1967-07-01	1986-05-12	incorporated as a village
Memramcook	Westmorland	Dorchester	1978-09-06	1995-05-08	annexed by village of Memramcook
Memramcook East (French: Memramcook-est)	Westmorland	Dorchester	1979-10-11	1995-05-08	annexed by Memramcook
Menneval	Restigouche	Eldon	1986-01-10	2019-06-01	part of LSD St. Jean Baptiste – Menneval
Moorefield	Northumberland	Newcastle	1989-09-01	1995-01-01	annexed by Miramichi
Nash Creek	Restigouche	Durham	1968-07-17	1996-12-10	part of LSD Chaleur
Nashwaak	York	Saint Marys	1969-12-17	1987-08-14	returned to LSD The parish of Saint Marys
Nordin	Northumberland	Newcastle	1975-07-30	1995-01-01	annexed by Miramichi
Pigeon Hill-Coteau Road (French: Pigeon Hill-chemin Coteau)	Gloucester	Shippegan	1971-04-14	1987-08-04	split to form cores of LSD Pigeon Hill and LSD Coteau Road
Pointe-à-Bouleau	Gloucester	Saumarez	1988-04-19	2014-07-01	part of Regional Municipality of Tracadie
Point Verte Sud	Gloucester	Beresford	1973-03-14	1977-08-10	annexed by Pointe-Verte
Pont LaFrance	Gloucester	Saumarez	1982-04-01	2014-07-01	part of Regional Municipality of Tracadie
Pont Landry	Gloucester	Inkerman, Saint-Isidore, Saumarez	1986-01-10	2014-07-01	part of Regional Municipality of Tracadie
Portage-de-Shippegan (French: Portage de Shippagan)	Gloucester	Shippegan	1979-05-03	2001-10-01	annexed by Shippagan
Portage River-Tracadie Beach (French: Rivière-du-Portage-Tracadie Beach)	Northumberland, Gloucester	Alnwick, Saumarez	1979-08-16	2014-07-01	part of Regional Municipality of Tracadie
Pré-d'en-Haut	Westmorland	Dorchester	1969-09-24	1995-05-08	annexed by Memramcook
Richardsville	Restigouche	Dalhousie	1966-11-23	1980-10-23	annexed by Campbellton
Rivière à la Truite	Gloucester	Saumarez	1989-09-07	2014-07-01	part of Regional Municipality of Tracadie
The parish of Saint-André	Madawaska		1966-11-23	2006-07-31	merged with village of St. André to form rural community of Saint-André
Saint-André & LeBlanc Office (French: Saint-André & Leblanc Office)	Westmorland	Shediac, Botsford, Sackville	1987-11-30	1995-05-08	part of rural community of Beaubassin East
The parish of Saint Andrews	Charlotte		1970-06-03	1997-07-29	replaced by LSD Chamcook
St. Arthur (French: St-Arthur)	Restigouche	Addington	1970-08-12	2015-07-01	annexed by Atholville
The parish of Saint-François	Madawaska		1966-11-23	2017-07-01	part of rural community of Haut-Madawaska
The parish of Saint-Hilaire	Madawaska		1966-11-23	2017-07-01	part of rural community of Haut-Madawaska
Saint Irénée and Alderwood (French: Saint Irénée et Alderwood)	Gloucester	Saumarez	1987-04-21	2014-07-01	part of Regional Municipality of Tracadie
St. Isidore Centre (French: St-Isidore-centre)	Gloucester	Saint-Isidore	1970-06-24	1991-06-01	incorporated as core of village of Saint-Isidore
St. Jean Baptiste de Restigouche (French: Saint-Jean-Baptiste-de-Restigouche)	Restigouche	Eldon	1966-11-23	2019-06-01	part of LSD St. Jean Baptiste – Menneval
St. Leolin	Gloucester	New Bandon	1969-12-17	1978-06-14	incorporated as village of Saint-Léolin
St. Paul (French: St-Paul)	Gloucester	New Bandon	1977-06-22	1990-01-01	annexed by Grande-Anse (Note: Conversion between imperial and metric measure when boundary descriptions were updated might leave a narrow strip between Saint-Léolin and Grande-Anse.)
Saint-Pons	Gloucester	Saumarez	1985-03-15	2014-07-01	part of Regional Municipality of Tracadie
St. Raphael sur-Mer (French: St-Raphaël-Sur-Mer)	Gloucester	Shippegan	1970-03-25	1986-05-12	most incorporated as core of Sainte-Marie-Saint-Raphaël; remainder returned to LSD The parish of Shippegan, then separated as LSD Cap-Bateau
Sainte-Rose	Gloucester	Inkerman, Paquetville, Saint-Isidore	1988-07-12	2014-07-01	part of Regional Municipality of Tracadie
Saumarez	Gloucester	Saumarez	1987-04-21	2014-07-01	part of Regional Municipality of Tracadie
the local service district of the Parish of Saumarez (French: la paroisse de Saumarez)	Gloucester		1968-06-27	2014-07-01	part of Regional Municipality of Tracadie
Shediac Road (French: Chemin Shédiac)	Westmorland	Dorchester	1980-10-23	1995-05-08	annexed by Memramcook
Sheila	Gloucester	Saumarez	1970-09-02	1978-08-16	incorporated as a village; now part of Regional Municipality of Tracadie
Silverwood	York	Kingsclear	1968-01-31	1968-09-18	incorporated as village of Springhill; now part of Fredericton
the local service district of Upper Miramichi	Northumberland, York	Ludlow, Stanley	1971-03-10	2008-03-17	incorporated as rural community
Upper Portage River (Haut-Rivière-du-Portage)	Northumberland	Alnwick	1971-12-15	2014-07-01	part of Regional Municipality of Tracadie
Val-Comeau (French: Val- Comeau [sic])	Gloucester, Northumberland	Saumarez, Alnwick	1985-03-15	2014-07-01	part of Regional Municipality of Tracadie
Val D'Amours	Restigouche	Addington, Balmoral, Dalhousie	1980-10-09	2015-07-01	annexed by Atholville
Verret	Madawaska	Madawaska	1967-07-07	1978-06-21	incorporated as a village; now part of Edmundston
the local service district of Woodwards Cove	Charlotte	Grand Manan	1967-04-17	1995-05-08	annexed by village of Grand Manan

== Special services areas ==
The following were areas within local service districts that generally received services not provided in other parts of the LSD.

- the parish of Acadieville
  - Acadie Siding (Note: Area with reduced services.)
- the parish of Alnwick
  - Barryville-New Jersey (Note: Counted as an LSD in 2016 Canadian Census, sometimes with a slight difference in name and/or altered boundaries.)
- the parish of Beresford
  - Alcida and Dauversière
  - Nicholas-Denys, Free Grant, Sainte-Rosette and Sormany
    - Nicholas-Denys, Free Grant and Sainte-Rosette
    - Sormany
  - Petit Rocher West (Petit-Rocher-Ouest)
  - Saint-Laurent
  - Saint-Laurent Nord
  - Sainte-Louise
  - Sainte-Thérèse Sud
- the parish of Dorchester and the parish of Moncton
  - Calhoun Road
- the parish of Douglas
  - Carlisle Road (chemin Carlisle)
  - Lower Douglas
- the parish of Hampton
  - Fairmont Subdivision (Lotissement de Fairmont)
- the parish of Havelock
  - Havelock Inside (Note: Boundaries extended into the parish of Salisbury)
- the parish of Kingsclear
  - Oswald Gray
- the parish of Maugerville
  - Inner Maugerville
- the parish of Moncton
  - Greater Lakeburn
  - Irishtown
  - Painsec Junction
- the parish of New Maryland
  - Howorth
  - Nasonworth
- the parish of Sainte-Anne
  - Seigas
- the parish of Saint George
  - Bonny River-Second Falls
- the parish of Saint-Isidore
  - Bois-Blanc-Hacheyville-Duguayville
    - Bois-Blanc
- the parish of Saint-Léonard
  - Poitier
  - Saint-Léonard-Parent
- the parish of Saint-Louis
  - Canisto Road (chemin Canisto)
- the parish of Saint Marys
  - Evergreen Park
  - Pepper Creek
- the parish of Shippegan
  - Pointe Brûlée
- the parish of Studholm
  - Lower Millstream
- the parish of Sussex
  - Apohaqui
- the parish of Wakefield
  - Wakefield Inside
- the parish of Wellington
  - Bouctouche Cove
  - Desroches
  - Dixon Point-Route 134
  - Saint-Grégoire (Note: Boundaries extended into the parish of Dundas.)
- the parish of Westfield
  - the Kingston Peninsula and Kennebecasis Island

== See also ==
- 2023 New Brunswick local governance reform
