= Gloucester County, New Brunswick =

County in New Brunswick, Canada

Coordinates: 47°43′3.6″N 64°49′21.2″W

Gloucester
- County
- Gloucester County
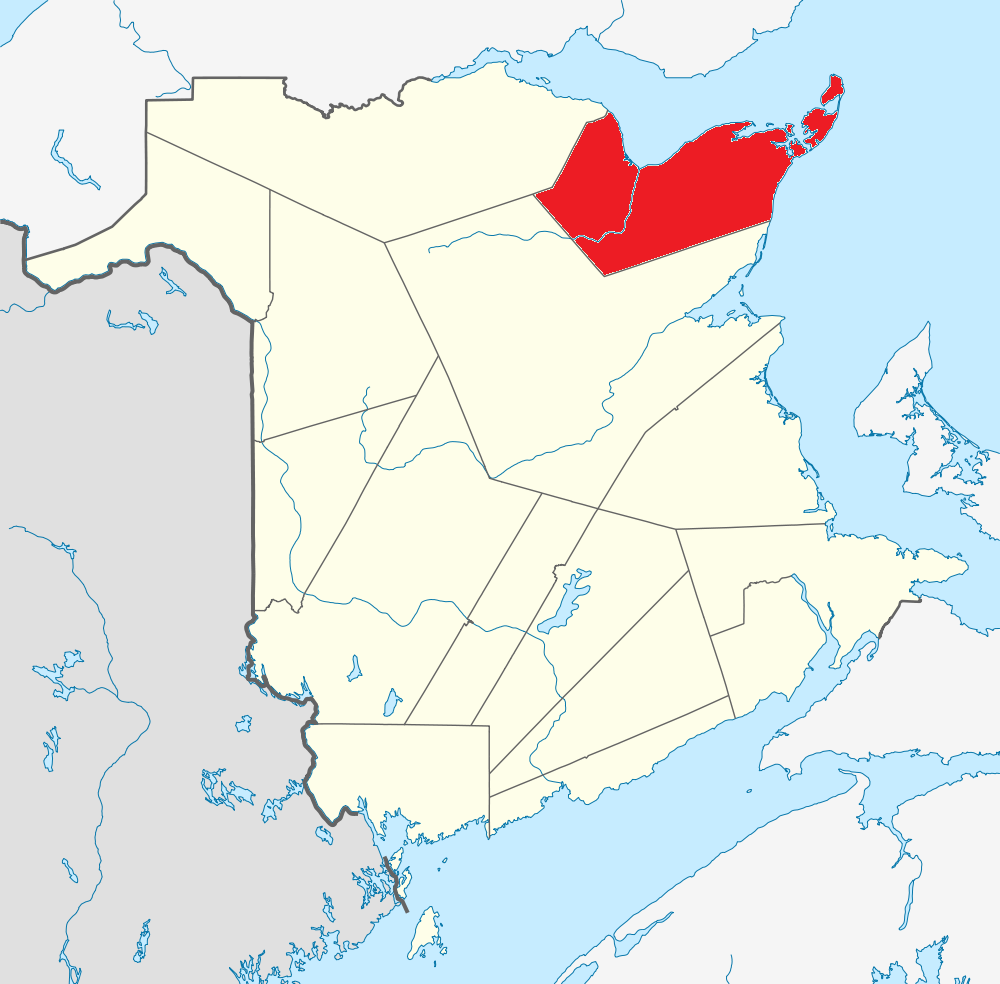
- Location within New Brunswick.
- Country: Canada
- Province: New Brunswick
- Established: 1826
- Named for: Princess Mary, Duchess of Gloucester and Edinburgh

Area
  - Land: 4,734.30 km^{2} (1,827.92 sq mi)

Population (2021)
  - Total: 78,256
  - Density: 16.5/km^{2} (43/sq mi)
  - Change 2016-2021: ▼0.2%
  - Dwellings: 39,145
- Time zone: UTC-4 (AST)
  - Summer (DST): UTC-3 (ADT)
- Area code: 506

Gloucester County (2021 population 78,256) is located in the northeastern corner of New Brunswick, Canada. Fishing, mining and forestry are the major industries in the county. The eastern section of the county is known for its Acadian culture. The county is named for Princess Mary, Duchess of Gloucester and Edinburgh.

== Census subdivisions ==
=== Communities ===
There are 19 municipalities within the county. They are listed below by 2016 population:

Official name	Designation	Area km^{2}	Population	Parish
Bathurst	City	92.04	11,897	Bathurst
Tracadie-Sheila	Town (dissolved)	24.65	5,171	Saumarez
Beresford	Town	19.41	4,288	Beresford
Caraquet	Town	68.35	4,248	Caraquet
Shippagan	Town	10.02	2,580	Shippagan
Petit-Rocher	Village	4.52	1,897	Beresford
Belledune	Village	189.47	1,417	Beresford
Bas-Caraquet	Village	31.01	1,305	Caraquet
Lamèque	Town	12.51	1,285	Shippagan
Bertrand	Village	57.44	1,166	Caraquet
Nigadoo	Village	7.65	963	Beresford
Grande-Anse	Village	24.33	899	New Bandon
Pointe-Verte	Village	13.79	886	Beresford
Sainte-Marie-Saint-Raphaël	Village	15.90	879	Shippagan
Le Goulet	Village	5.49	793	Shippagan
Saint-Isidore	Village	22.94	764	Saint-Isidore
Paquetville	Village	9.26	720	Paquetville
Saint-Léolin	Village	19.73	647	New Bandon
Maisonnette	Village	12.90	495	New Bandon

=== First Nations ===
There is one First Nations reservation in Gloucester County (listed with 2016 population):

Official name	Designation	Area km^{2}	Population	Parish
Pabineau 11	Reservation	4.92	134	Bathurst

=== Parishes ===
The county is subdivided into ten parishes (listed by 2016 population):

Official name	Area km^{2}	Population	Municipalities	Unincorporated communities
Saumarez	326.78	6,618	Tracadie-Sheila (town)	Benoit / Charnisay / Commeau / Ferguson Point / Gauvreau / Haut-Sheila / Leech / Little Gaspereau / Losier Settlement / Petit-Tracadie / Pointe-à-Bouleau / Pont-Lafrance / Rivière-à-la-truite / Saint Irénée and Alderwood / Saint-Isidore Station / Saint-Pons / Saumarez / St. Pierre / Tracadie Beach / Val-Comeau
Beresford	456.86	6,248	Beresford (town); Petit-Rocher (village); Belledune (village); Nigadoo (village); Pointe-Verte (village)	Alcida and Dauversière / Dempsey Settlement / Devereaux / Dunlop / Free Grant / LaPlante / Lincour / Madran / Massabielle / Nicholas-Denys / Robertville / Saint-Laurent / Sainte-Louise / Sainte-Rosette / Sormany / St. George / Tremblay / Val-Michaud
Shippegan	208.08	4,800	Shippagan (town); Lamèque (town); Le Goulet (village); Ste-Marie-St-Raphaël (village)	Cap-Bateau / Chiasson-Savoy / Coteau Road / Haut-Lamèque / Haut-Shippagan / Herring Point / Miscou Centre / Miscou Harbour / Miscou Lighthouse / Miscou Plains / Petite-Lamèque / Petite-Rivière-de-l'lle / Petit-Shippagan / Pigeon Hill / Pointe-Alexandre / Pointe-Brûlé / Pointe-Canot / Sainte-Cécile / Shippagan Portage / Wilson Point
Bathurst	1504.87	4,797	Bathurst (city); Pabineau 11 (reservation)	Bartibog Station / Bathurst Mines / Big Antler / Big Moose / Big River / Blue Mountain Settlement / Bruce / Brunswick Mines / Chamberlain Settlement / Goodwin Mill / Gloucester Junction / Hachey Siding / Lawson Brook Siding / Miller Brook / Nepisiguit Junction / North Tetagouche / Ottawa Road / Pitre Road / Red Pine / Rio Grande / Russell / Salmon Beach / South Tetagouche / Tetagouche Hill / Upper Rosehill
Inkerman	107.56	2,366		Boudreau Road / Cowans Creek / Evangeline / Four Roads / Gaspereau / Haché Road / Haut Pokemouche / Inkerman / Inkerman Ferry / Landry / Maltampec / Pokemouche / Pokemouche Junction / Sainte-Rose-Gloucester / Six Roads
Paquetville	220.51	2,329	Paquetville (village)	Burnsville / Notre-Dame-des-Érables / Petit-Paquetville / Rang-Saint-Georges / Saint-Amateur / Trudel / Val-Doucet
Allardville	654.69	2,032		Allardville / Allardville East / Veniot / Bear Landing / Beaubois / Butte-d'Or / Daulnay / Goodwin Mill / Jeanne-Mance / Saint-Sauveur
Saint-Isidore	173.25	1,361	Saint-Isidore (village)	Bois-Blanc / Bois-Gagnon / Boishébert / Duguayville / Hacheyville / Haut-Saint-Isidore / Haut Tilley Road / Pokemouche Landing / Pont-Landry / Spruce Brook / Tilley Road
Caraquet	109.97	1,337	Caraquet (town); Bas-Caraquet (village); Bertrand (village)	Blanchard Settlement / Caraquet Island / Haut-Saint-Simon / Marsoliau / Pokesudie / Saint-Simon / Saint-Simon Centre
New Bandon	359.11	1,214	Grande-Anse (village); Maisonnette (village); Saint-Léolin (village)	Anse-Bleue / Bertrand Station / Black Rock / Canobie / Clifton / Dugas / Janeville / Johnson / Lobster Beach / New Bandon-Salmon Beach / Pokeshaw / Rocheville / Springfield / Stonehaven / Village-des-Poirier / Village-Saint-Paul / Waterloo Settlement

== Demographics ==
Historical Census Data - Gloucester County, New Brunswick
Year	Pop.	±%
1991	87,613	—
1996	87,601	−0.0%
2001	82,929	−5.3%
2006	78,948	−4.8%
2011	77,792	−1.5%
2011 rev	79,943	+2.8%
2016	78,444	−1.9%
2021	78,256	−0.2%
The 2011 population count was revised

As a census division in the 2021 Census of Population conducted by Statistics Canada, Gloucester County had a population of 78,256 living in 35,830 of its 39,145 total private dwellings, a change of −0.2% from its 2016 population of 78,444. With a land area of 4,734.3 km^{2} (1,827.9 sq mi), it had a population density of 16.5/km^{2} (42.8/sq mi) in 2021.

Canada census – Gloucester community profile

	2021	2016	2011
Population	78,256 (-0.2% from 2016)	78,444 (+0.8% from 2011)	77,792 (-1.5% from 2006)
Land area	4,734.30 km^{2} (1,827.92 sq mi)	4,743.67 km^{2} (1,831.54 sq mi)	4,675.21 km^{2} (1,805.11 sq mi)
Population density	16.5/km^{2} (43/sq mi)	16.5/km^{2} (43/sq mi)	16.6/km^{2} (43/sq mi)
Median age	53.6 (M: 52.8, F: 54.0)	51.1 (M: 50.5, F: 51.6)	47.9 (M: 47.4, F: 48.4)
Private dwellings	39,145 (total) 35,830 (occupied)	38,789 (total)	36,482 (total)
Median household income	$60,800	$52,793	$46,728

References: 2021 2016 2011

=== Language ===
Canada Census Mother Tongue - Gloucester County, New Brunswick
Census	Total	French			English			French & English			Non-official languages		
Year	Responses	Count	Trend	Pop %	Count	Trend	Pop %	Count	Trend	Pop %	Count	Trend	Pop %
2016	77,065	64,890	▲1.0%	84.20%	10,795	▼2.8%	14.01%	810	▲8.0%	1.05%	220	▼44.3%	0.28%
2011	76,515	64,270	▼1.4%	84.00%	11,105	▼0.5%	14.51%	745	▲19.2%	0.97%	395	▼41.5%	0.52%
2006	77,675	65,210	▼4.7%	83.95%	11,165	▼8.9%	14.37%	625	▼26.0%	0.80%	675	▲206.8%	0.87%
2001	81,760	68,440	▼5.0%	83.71%	12,255	▼9.5%	14.99%	845	▲8.3%	1.03%	220	▼6.4%	0.27%
1996	86,620	72,060	n/a	83.19%	13,545	n/a	15.64%	780	n/a	0.90%	235	n/a	0.27%

== Access Routes ==
Highways and numbered routes that run through the county, including external routes that start or finish at the county limits:

- Highways
  - Route 8
  - Route 11
- Principal Routes
  - Route 113
  - Route 134
  - Route 135
  - Route 145
  - Route 150
  - Route 160
  - Route 180
- Secondary Routes:
  - Route 315
  - Route 320
  - Route 322
  - Route 303
  - Route 305
  - Route 310
  - Route 313
  - Route 325
  - Route 330
  - Route 335
- Secondary Routes (cont):
  - Route 340
  - Route 345
  - Route 350
  - Route 355
  - Route 360
  - Route 363
  - Route 365
  - Route 370
  - Route 430
- External Routes:
  - None

== See also ==
- List of communities in New Brunswick
- Royal eponyms in Canada
