= Saint-Pons =

Saint-Pons may refer to:

== Places in France ==
- Saint-Pons, Alpes-de-Haute-Provence, in the Alpes-de-Haute-Provence department
- Saint-Pons, Ardèche, in the Ardèche department
- Saint-Pons-de-Mauchiens, in the Hérault department
- Saint-Pons-de-Thomières, in the Hérault department
- Saint-Pons-la-Calm, in the Gard department

== Places in Canada ==
- Saint-Pons, New Brunswick, a former local service district in New Brunswick

== See also ==
- Saint Pontius (disambiguation), a number of Catholic saints
