= Brantville =

Brantville may refer to the following locations:

- Brantville, New Brunswick
- Brantville, West Virginia
