= New Brunswick Route 305 =

Highway in New Brunswick, Canada

Route 305

Route information
- Maintained by New Brunswick Department of Transportation
- Length: 19.42 km (12.07 mi)

Major junctions
- North end: Route 113 East of Haut-Lameque
- South end: Chaleur Bay South End

Location
- Country: Canada
- Province: New Brunswick
- Major cities: Haut-Lamèque, Ste-Marie-St-Raphaël, Cap-Bateau, Pigeon Hill

Highway system
- Provincial highways in New Brunswick; Former routes
| ← Route 303 | → Route 310 |

Route 305 is a 19 km (12 mi) north–south secondary highway in the northeast Canadian province of New Brunswick.

The route's southern terminus is east of Haut-Lameque on Lameque Island where it is known as Rue Sainte-Marie. The route travels southeast to the village of Ste-Marie-St-Raphaël. From here, the highway takes a sharp turn north following the Gulf of St. Lawrence continues north to the town of Cap-Bateau and passes Grand Etang before intersecting with Route 310. From there, the highway continues north to the community of Pigeon Hill. The last stretch of the highway continues north before ending at Chaleur Bay at Pointe a Baleine.

== See also ==
- List of New Brunswick provincial highways
