= Pepper Creek =

Pepper Creek may refer to:

- Pepper Creek (Delaware), United States, a stream
- Pepper Creek, Marion Township, Davis County, Iowa, United States, a stream
- Pepper Creek, New Brunswick, Canada, a local service district
- Pepper Creek Outdoor Learning Center, Dawes County, Nebraska
