= Évangéline, New Brunswick =

Évangéline, New Brunswick may refer to:

- Evangéline, New Brunswick (designated place), a local service district in Inkerman Parish
- Evangeline, Westmorland County, New Brunswick, a community in Greater Moncton, Westmorland County
