= Gauvreau, New Brunswick =

Coordinates: 47.533222°N 64.987944°W

Location of Gauvreau in New Brunswick

Gauvreau was a Canadian rural community located in Gloucester County, New Brunswick. It is now part of the Regional Municipality of Grand Tracadie–Sheila.

== See also ==
- List of communities in New Brunswick
