= Western Charlotte =

Western Charlotte or Charlotte West may refer to:

- Charlotte West (horse), a British thoroughbred racehorse
- Charlotte West (electoral district), a defunct provincial electoral district in New Brunswick, Canada
- Western Charlotte, New Brunswick, a local service district near St. Stephen, New Brunswick, Canada
- Western Charlotte (Electoral District), a provincial electoral district in southwestern New Brunswick
