= Canton-des-Basques =

Coordinates: 47.542°N 64.922°W

Location of Canton des Basques in New Brunswick

Canton des Basques is a settlement in New Brunswick. The name was also applied to an area of the local service district of the Parish of Saumarez with enhanced services, now part of the Regional Municipality of Tracadie.

== Demographics ==
In the 2021 Census of Population conducted by Statistics Canada, Canton des Basques had a population of 319 living in 152 of its 159 total private dwellings, a change of -6.7% from its 2016 population of 342. With a land area of 1.47 km^{2} (0.57 sq mi), it had a population density of 217.0/km^{2} (562.0/sq mi) in 2021.

== See also ==
- List of communities in New Brunswick
