= Saint-Simon, New Brunswick =

Saint-Simon
- Settlement
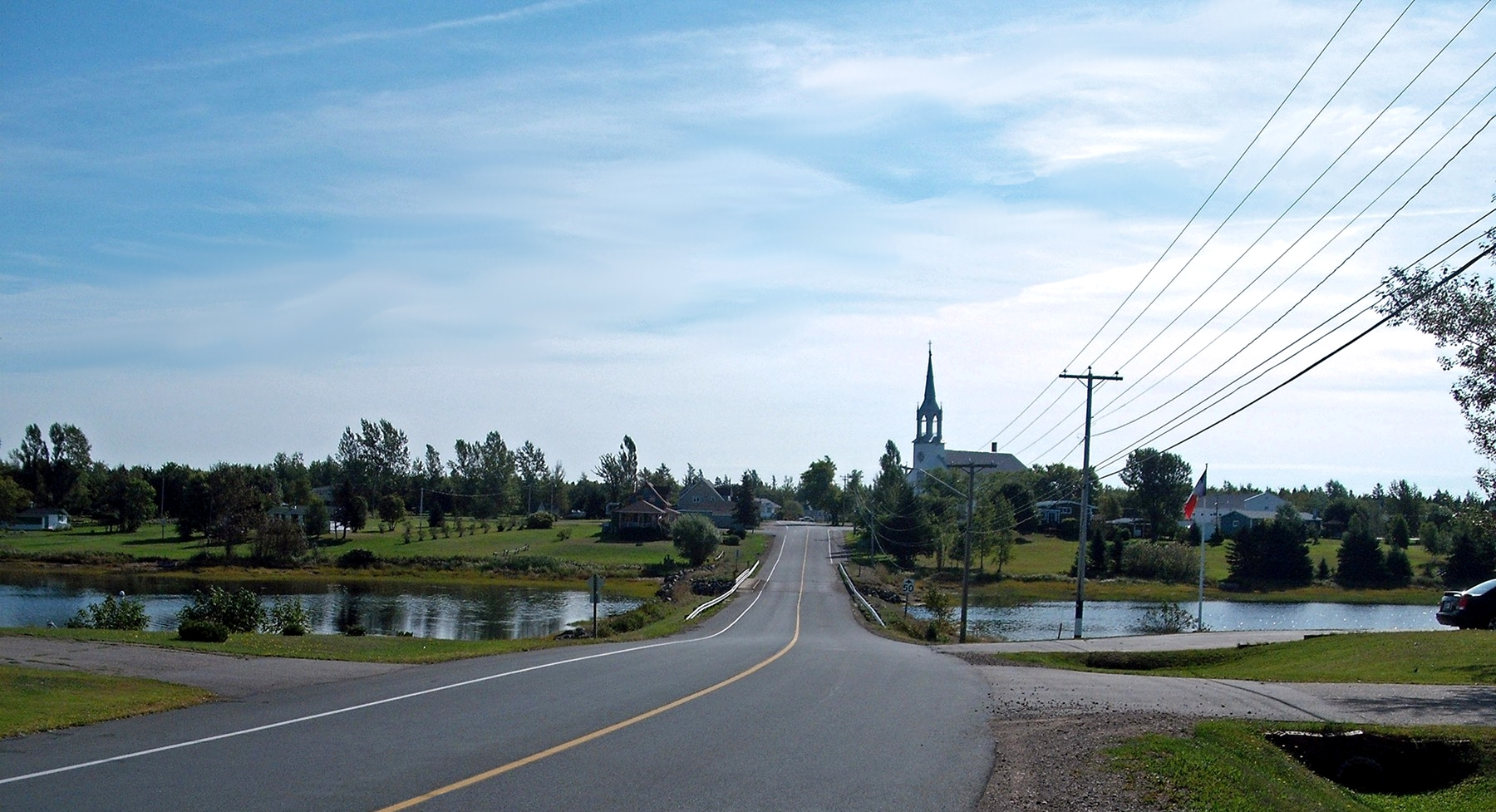
- Entrance to Saint-Simon

- Location of Saint-Simon in New Brunswick
- Coordinates: 47.7773°N 64.8892°W
- Country: Canada
- Province: New Brunswick
- County: Gloucester

Population (2011)
  - Total: 724
  - Density: 40/km^{2} (100/sq mi)
- Time zone: UTC-4 (AST)
  - Summer (DST): UTC-3 (ADT)

Saint-Simon or St. Simon is a settlement in Gloucester County, New Brunswick, Canada. It is located in the Acadian Peninsula.

Saint-Simon is primarily a francophone community.

The former local service district of St. Simon included Saint-Simon and several nearby communities.

== Demographics ==
In the 2021 Census of Population conducted by Statistics Canada, St. Simon had a population of 648 living in 307 of its 333 total private dwellings, a change of −7.4% from its 2016 population of 700. With a land area of 18.11 km^{2} (6.99 sq mi), it had a population density of 35.8/km^{2} (92.7/sq mi) in 2021.

== Education ==
Since the closure of the École Lorette-Doiron, French-speaking students benefit from schools in Caraquet. The town of Shippagan is home to the CCNB-Péninsule acadienne campus of the Université de Moncton.

English-speaking people have a school in Brantville which welcomes students from kindergarten to eighth grade. They must then continue their studies in Miramichi. The closest English higher education institutions are in Fredericton, the provincial capital, or Miramichi.

There is a public library in Caraquet. However, the Bookmobile North makes a stop in the village.

== See also ==
- List of communities in New Brunswick
