= Cap-de-Richiboucto, New Brunswick =

Coordinates: 46.659988°N 64.766108°W

Cap-de-Richiboucto is an unincorporated place in New Brunswick, Canada. It is recognized as a designated place by Statistics Canada.

== Demographics ==
In the 2021 Census of Population conducted by Statistics Canada, Cap-de-Richiboucto had a population of 1,067 living in 508 of its 599 total private dwellings, a change of 7.9% from its 2016 population of 989. With a land area of 62.02 km^{2} (23.95 sq mi), it had a population density of 17.2/km^{2} (44.6/sq mi) in 2021.

== See also ==
- List of communities in New Brunswick
