= Ste. Cécile, New Brunswick =

Coordinates: 47.855151°N 64.665440°W

Ste. Cécile is an unincorporated place in New Brunswick, Canada. It is recognized as a designated place by Statistics Canada.

== Demographics ==
In the 2021 Census of Population conducted by Statistics Canada, Ste. Cécile had a population of 733 living in 351 of its 388 total private dwellings, a change of 0.1% from its 2016 population of 732. With a land area of 18.56 km^{2} (7.17 sq mi), it had a population density of 39.5/km^{2} (102.3/sq mi) in 2021.

== See also ==
- List of communities in New Brunswick
