= St. Martin-de-Restigouche, New Brunswick =

Coordinates: 47.567661°N 67.336770°W

St. Martin-de-Restigouche is an unincorporated place in New Brunswick, Canada. It is recognized as a designated place by Statistics Canada.

== Demographics ==
In the 2021 Census of Population conducted by Statistics Canada, St. Martin-de-Restigouche had a population of 105 living in 44 of its 47 total private dwellings, a change of 14.1% from its 2016 population of 92. With a land area of 5.77 km^{2} (2.23 sq mi), it had a population density of 18.2/km^{2} (47.1/sq mi) in 2021.

== See also ==
- List of communities in New Brunswick
