= Benton, New Brunswick =

Local service district in New Brunswick

Coordinates: 45.987°N 67.609°W

Location of Benton in New Brunswick

Benton was a local service district that was partially within Carleton County and partially within York County in the Canadian province New Brunswick. Straddling the boundaries of two parishes – Woodstock and Canterbury – the local service district was divided into two designated places by Statistics Canada.

== Demographics ==
In the 2021 Census of Population conducted by Statistics Canada, Benton had a population of 88 living in 37 of its 39 total private dwellings, a change of 6% from its 2016 population of 83. With a land area of 12.31 km^{2} (4.75 sq mi), it had a population density of 7.1/km^{2} (18.5/sq mi) in 2021.

Population of Benton
Name	County	Parish	Population (2021)	Population (2016)	Change	Land area (km^{2})	Population density
Benton part A	Carleton County	Woodstock	55	50	+10.0%	8.52	6.5/km^{2}
Benton part B	York County	Canterbury	33	33	0.0%	3.79	8.7/km^{2}
Total	—	—	88	83	+6.0%	12.31	7.1/km^{2}

== See also ==
- List of communities in New Brunswick
- List of local service districts in New Brunswick
