= Pointe Sauvage (Indian Point), New Brunswick =

Coordinates: 47.727225°N 64.689629°W

Pointe Sauvage (Indian Point) is an unincorporated place in New Brunswick, Canada. It is recognized as a designated place by Statistics Canada.

== Demographics ==
In the 2021 Census of Population conducted by Statistics Canada, Pointe Sauvage (Indian Point) had a population of 74 living in 34 of its 38 total private dwellings, a change of -12.9% from its 2016 population of 85. With a land area of 2.16 km^{2} (0.83 sq mi), it had a population density of 34.3/km^{2} (88.7/sq mi) in 2021.

== See also ==
- List of communities in New Brunswick
