= Balmoral - St. Maure, New Brunswick =

Coordinates: 47.950364°N 66.468278°W

Balmoral - St. Maure is an unincorporated place in New Brunswick, Canada. It is recognized as a designated place by Statistics Canada.

== Demographics ==
In the 2021 Census of Population conducted by Statistics Canada, Balmoral - St. Maure had a population of 156 living in 63 of its 68 total private dwellings, a change of 5.4% from its 2016 population of 148. With a land area of 11.2 km^{2} (4.3 sq mi), it had a population density of 13.9/km^{2} (36.1/sq mi) in 2021.

== See also ==
- List of communities in New Brunswick
