= Dennis-Weston, New Brunswick =

Coordinates: 45.241792°N 67.284971°W

Dennis-Weston is an unincorporated place in New Brunswick, Canada. It is recognized as a designated place by Statistics Canada.

== Demographics ==
In the 2021 Census of Population conducted by Statistics Canada, Dennis-Weston had a population of 970 living in 412 of its 450 total private dwellings, a change of -5.2% from its 2016 population of 1,023. With a land area of 43.57 km^{2} (16.82 sq mi), it had a population density of 22.3/km^{2} (57.7/sq mi) in 2021.

== See also ==
- List of communities in New Brunswick
