= Westfield East, New Brunswick =

Coordinates: 45.357831°N 66.165032°W

Westfield East is an unincorporated place in New Brunswick, Canada. It is recognized as a designated place by Statistics Canada.

== Demographics ==
In the 2021 Census of Population conducted by Statistics Canada, Westfield East had a population of 657 living in 291 of its 330 total private dwellings, a change of 9.5% from its 2016 population of 600. With a land area of 60.78 km^{2} (23.47 sq mi), it had a population density of 10.8/km^{2} (28.0/sq mi) in 2021.

== See also ==
- List of communities in New Brunswick
