= St.-Jean Baptiste-de-Restigouche, New Brunswick =

Coordinates: 47.767358°N 67.211962°W

St.-Jean Baptiste-de-Restigouche is an unincorporated place in New Brunswick, Canada. It is recognized as a designated place by Statistics Canada.

== Demographics ==
In the 2021 Census of Population conducted by Statistics Canada, St.-Jean Baptiste-de-Restigouche had a population of 146 living in 72 of its 78 total private dwellings, a change of -9.3% from its 2016 population of 161. With a land area of 96.01 km^{2} (37.07 sq mi), it had a population density of 1.5/km^{2} (3.9/sq mi) in 2021.

== See also ==
- List of communities in New Brunswick
