= Grand Saint-Antoine, New Brunswick =

Local service district in New Brunswick

Coordinates: 46.363°N 64.753°W

Location of Grand Saint-Antoine in New Brunswick

Grand Saint-Antoine was a local service district within Kent County that surrounded the village of Saint-Antoine in the Canadian province New Brunswick. Straddling the boundaries of three parishes – Dundas, Saint Mary, and Wellington – the local service district was divided into three designated places by Statistics Canada.

== Demographics ==
In the 2021 Census of Population conducted by Statistics Canada, Grand Saint-Antoine had a population of 488 living in 192 of its 207 total private dwellings, a change of 3.6% from its 2016 population of 471. With a land area of 31.21 km^{2} (12.05 sq mi), it had a population density of 15.6/km^{2} (40.5/sq mi) in 2021.

Population of Grand Saint-Antoine
Name	Parish	Population (2021)	Population (2016)	Change	Land area (km^{2})	Population density
Grand Saint-Antoine part A	Saint Mary	223	230	−3.0%	10.16	21.9/km^{2}
Grand Saint-Antoine part B	Dundas	161	153	+5.2%	13.01	12.4/km^{2}
Grand Saint-Antoine part C	Wellington	104	88	+18.2%	8.04	12.9/km^{2}
Total	—	488	471	+3.6%	31.21	15.6/km^{2}

== See also ==
- List of communities in New Brunswick
- List of local service districts in New Brunswick
