= Nevers Road, New Brunswick =

Unincorporated place in New Brunswick, Canada

Coordinates: 45.858710°N 66.561460°W

Nevers Road is an unincorporated place in New Brunswick, Canada. It is recognized as a designated place by Statistics Canada.

== Demographics ==
In the 2021 Census of Population conducted by Statistics Canada, Nevers Road had a population of 417 living in 183 of its 184 total private dwellings, a change of -1% from its 2016 population of 421. With a land area of 1.69 km^{2} (0.65 sq mi), it had a population density of 246.7/km^{2} (639.1/sq mi) in 2021.

== See also ==
- List of communities in New Brunswick
