= Bonny River-Second Falls, New Brunswick =

Coordinates: 45.202086°N 66.857558°W

Bonny River-Second Falls is an unincorporated place in New Brunswick, Canada. It is recognized as a designated place by Statistics Canada.

== Demographics ==
In the 2021 Census of Population conducted by Statistics Canada, Bonny-River - Second Falls had a population of 420 living in 175 of its 183 total private dwellings, a change of 10.2% from its 2016 population of 381. With a land area of 169.03 km^{2} (65.26 sq mi), it had a population density of 2.5/km^{2} (6.4/sq mi) in 2021.

== See also ==
- List of communities in New Brunswick
