= Beresford Sud, New Brunswick =

Coordinates: 47.667763°N 65.870826°W

Beresford Sud is an unincorporated place in New Brunswick, Canada. It is recognized as a designated place by Statistics Canada.

== Demographics ==
In the 2021 Census of Population conducted by Statistics Canada, Beresford Sud had a population of 1,523 living in 687 of its 718 total private dwellings, a change of -0.1% from its 2016 population of 1,525. With a land area of 239.95 km^{2} (92.65 sq mi), it had a population density of 6.3/km^{2} (16.4/sq mi) in 2021.

== See also ==
- List of communities in New Brunswick
