= Beresford Nord, New Brunswick =

Coordinates: 47.782491°N 65.835649°W

Beresford Nord is an unincorporated place in New Brunswick, Canada. It is recognized as a designated place by Statistics Canada.

== Demographics ==
In the 2021 Census of Population conducted by Statistics Canada, Beresford Nord had a population of 788 living in 319 of its 332 total private dwellings, a change of -2.2% from its 2016 population of 806. With a land area of 151.68 km^{2} (58.56 sq mi), it had a population density of 5.2/km^{2} (13.5/sq mi) in 2021.

== See also ==
- List of communities in New Brunswick
