= Saint Pontius =

Saint Pontius may refer to a number of Catholic saints:

- Pontius of Carthage (mid-third century), Christian saint and Latin author from Carthage
- Pontius of Cimiez (died 257), Roman saint
- Ebontius (died 1104), also known as Pontius, Bishop of Barbastro, Spain
