= Sainte-Louise, Kent County, New Brunswick =

Coordinates: 47°41′26.5″N 65°47′44.3″W

Location of Sainte-Louise in New Brunswick

Sainte-Louise is a settlement in the Canadian province of New Brunswick.

== See also ==
- List of communities in New Brunswick
