= Brantville, West Virginia =

Unincorporated community in West Virginia, United States

- Unincorporated community
- Location within West Virginia Location within the United States
- Coordinates: 37°54′14″N 80°26′03″W
- Country: United States
- State: West Virginia
- County: Greenbrier
- Elevation: 2,310 ft (700 m)
- Time zone: UTC-5 (Eastern (EST))
  - Summer (DST): UTC-4 (EDT)
- Area codes: 304 & 681
- GNIS feature ID: 1553966

Brantville is an unincorporated community in Greenbrier County, West Virginia, United States. Brantville is 7 miles (11 km) north of Lewisburg.
