= Pointe-à-Bouleau, New Brunswick =

Coordinates: 47.502°N 64.878°W

Location of Pointe-à-Bouleau in New Brunswick

Pointe-à-Bouleau was a settlement and local service district in Gloucester County, New Brunswick. It is now part of the Regional Municipality of Grand Tracadie–Sheila.

== Demographics ==
In the 2021 Census of Population conducted by Statistics Canada, Pointe-à-Bouleau had a population of 199 living in 83 of its 89 total private dwellings, a change of 4.2% from its 2016 population of 191. With a land area of 4.29 km^{2} (1.66 sq mi), it had a population density of 46.4/km^{2} (120.1/sq mi) in 2021.

== See also ==
- List of communities in New Brunswick
