= Upper and Lower Northampton, New Brunswick =

Coordinates: 46.068201°N 67.551340°W

Upper and Lower Northampton is an unincorporated place in New Brunswick, Canada. It is recognized as a designated place by Statistics Canada.

== Demographics ==
In the 2021 Census of Population conducted by Statistics Canada, Upper and Lower Northampton had a population of 348 living in 133 of its 142 total private dwellings, a change of 11.9% from its 2016 population of 311. With a land area of 64.28 km^{2} (24.82 sq mi), it had a population density of 5.4/km^{2} (14.0/sq mi) in 2021.

== See also ==
- List of communities in New Brunswick
