= Haut-Sheila, New Brunswick =

Human settlement in Regional Municipality of Tracadie, New Brunswick, Canada

Coordinates: 47.746°N 64.908°W

Location of Haut-Sheila in New Brunswick

Haut-Sheila was a local service district in Gloucester County, New Brunswick, centred around the settlement of Upper Sheila. It was incorporated into the Regional Municipality of Grand Tracadie–Sheila.

== Demographics ==
In the 2021 Census of Population conducted by Statistics Canada, Haut-Sheila had a population of 729 living in 317 of its 348 total private dwellings, a change of -3.1% from its 2016 population of 752. With a land area of 4.71 km^{2} (1.82 sq mi), it had a population density of 154.8/km^{2} (400.9/sq mi) in 2021.

== See also ==
- List of neighbourhoods in New Brunswick
