= Western Charlotte, New Brunswick =

Coordinates: 45.259982°N 67.386812°W

Western Charlotte is an unincorporated place in New Brunswick, Canada. It is recognized as a two-part designated place by Statistics Canada.

== Demographics ==
In the 2021 Census of Population conducted by Statistics Canada, Western Charlotte had a population of 851 living in 369 of its 401 total private dwellings, a change of -12.2% from its 2016 population of 969. With a land area of 190.94 km^{2} (73.72 sq mi), it had a population density of 4.5/km^{2} (11.5/sq mi) in 2021.

Population of Western Charlotte
Name	Population (2021)	Population (2016)	Change	Land area (km^{2})	Population density
Western Charlotte part A	373	435	−14.3%	162.01	2.3/km^{2}
Western Charlotte part B	478	534	−10.5%	28.93	16.5/km^{2}
Total	851	969	−12.2%	190.94	4.5/km^{2}

== See also ==
- List of communities in New Brunswick
