= Estey's Bridge, New Brunswick =

Coordinates: 46.079449°N 66.721116°W

Estey's Bridge is an unincorporated place in New Brunswick, Canada. It is recognized as a designated place by Statistics Canada.

== Demographics ==
In the 2021 Census of Population conducted by Statistics Canada, Estey's Bridge had a population of 1,908 living in 725 of its 742 total private dwellings, a change of 8% from its 2016 population of 1,766. With a land area of 152.05 km^{2} (58.71 sq mi), it had a population density of 12.5/km^{2} (32.5/sq mi) in 2021.

== See also ==
- List of communities in New Brunswick
