= Portage River-Tracadie Beach, New Brunswick =

Coordinates: 47.439266°N 64.922165°W

Portage River-Tracadie Beach is an unincorporated place in New Brunswick, Canada. It is recognized as a two-part designated place by Statistics Canada.

== Demographics ==
In the 2021 Census of Population conducted by Statistics Canada, Portage River-Tracadie Beach had a population of 561 living in 267 of its 291 total private dwellings, a change of -9.5% from its 2016 population of 620. With a land area of 17.63 km^{2} (6.81 sq mi), it had a population density of 31.8/km^{2} (82.4/sq mi) in 2021.

Population of Portage River-Tracadie Beach
Name	Population (2021)	Population (2016)	Change	Land area (km^{2})	Population density
Portage River-Tracadie Beach part A	440	499	−11.8%	15.56	28.3/km^{2}
Portage River-Tracadie Beach part B	121	119	+1.7%	2.07	58.5/km^{2}
Total	561	620	−9.5%	17.63	31.8/km^{2}

== See also ==
- List of communities in New Brunswick
