= Blair Athol, New Brunswick =

Coordinates: 47.938772°N 66.580939°W

Blair Athol is an unincorporated place in New Brunswick, Canada. It is recognized as a designated place by Statistics Canada.

== Demographics ==
In the 2021 Census of Population conducted by Statistics Canada, Blair Athol had a population of 52 living in 22 of its 22 total private dwellings, a change of -3.7% from its 2016 population of 54. With a land area of 5.73 km^{2} (2.21 sq mi), it had a population density of 9.1/km^{2} (23.5/sq mi) in 2021.

== See also ==
- List of communities in New Brunswick
