= Grand Barachois, New Brunswick =

Coordinates: 46.224286°N 64.422473°W

Grand Barachois is an unincorporated place in New Brunswick, Canada. It is recognized as a designated place by Statistics Canada.

== Demographics ==
In the 2021 Census of Population conducted by Statistics Canada, Grand Barachois had a population of 3,087 living in 1,304 of its 1,593 total private dwellings, a change of 9.5% from its 2016 population of 2,819. With a land area of 38.93 km^{2} (15.03 sq mi), it had a population density of 79.3/km^{2} (205.4/sq mi) in 2021.

== See also ==
- List of communities in New Brunswick
