= Upper Portage River, New Brunswick =

Coordinates: 47.411429°N 64.965506°W

Upper Portage River is an unincorporated place in New Brunswick, Canada. It is recognized as a designated place by Statistics Canada.

== Demographics ==
In the 2021 Census of Population conducted by Statistics Canada, Upper Portage River had a population of 656 living in 276 of its 293 total private dwellings, a change of -1.8% from its 2016 population of 668. With a land area of 8.47 km^{2} (3.27 sq mi), it had a population density of 77.4/km^{2} (200.6/sq mi) in 2021.

== See also ==
- List of communities in New Brunswick
