= Oswald Gray, New Brunswick =

Coordinates: 45.938322°N 66.867576°W

Oswald Gray is an unincorporated place in New Brunswick, Canada. It is recognized as a designated place by Statistics Canada.

== Demographics ==
In the 2021 Census of Population conducted by Statistics Canada, Oswald Gray had a population of 84 living in 35 of its 36 total private dwellings, a change of -18.4% from its 2016 population of 103. With a land area of 0.19 km^{2} (0.073 sq mi), it had a population density of 442.1/km^{2} (1,145.0/sq mi) in 2021.

== See also ==
- List of communities in New Brunswick
