= Scoudouc Road, New Brunswick =

Coordinates: 46.179623°N 64.436946°W

Scoudouc Road is an unincorporated place in New Brunswick, Canada. It is recognized as a designated place by Statistics Canada.

== Demographics ==
In the 2021 Census of Population conducted by Statistics Canada, Scoudouc Road had a population of 228 living in 91 of its 94 total private dwellings, a change of 18.1% from its 2016 population of 193. With a land area of 10.71 km^{2} (4.14 sq mi), it had a population density of 21.3/km^{2} (55.1/sq mi) in 2021.

== See also ==
- List of communities in New Brunswick
