= Boudreau West, New Brunswick =

Coordinates: 46.226690°N 64.482902°W

Boudreau West is an unincorporated place in New Brunswick, Canada. It is recognized as a designated place by Statistics Canada.

== Demographics ==
In the 2021 Census of Population conducted by Statistics Canada, Boudreau West had a population of 360 living in 169 of its 243 total private dwellings, a change of 0.6% from its 2016 population of 358. With a land area of 4.78 km^{2} (1.85 sq mi), it had a population density of 75.3/km^{2} (195.1/sq mi) in 2021.

== See also ==
- List of communities in New Brunswick
