= Baie du Petit Pokemouche, New Brunswick =

Coordinates: 47.706865°N 65.733750°W

Baie du Petit Pokemouche is an unincorporated community in New Brunswick Canada. It is recognized as a designated place by Statistics Canada.

== Demographics ==
In the 2021 Census of Population conducted by Statistics Canada, Baie du Petit Pokemouche had a population of 162 living in 76 of its 81 total private dwellings, a change of 0% from its 2016 population of 162. With a land area of 2.69 km^{2} (1.04 sq mi), it had a population density of 60.2/km^{2} (156.0/sq mi) in 2021.

== See also ==
- List of communities in New Brunswick
