= Evangéline, New Brunswick (designated place) =

Coordinates: 47.692490°N 64.845688°W

Evangéline is an unincorporated place in New Brunswick, Canada. It is recognized as a designated place by Statistics Canada.

== Demographics ==
In the 2021 Census of Population conducted by Statistics Canada, Evangéline had a population of 340 living in 132 of its 140 total private dwellings, a change of -7.6% from its 2016 population of 368. With a land area of 6.73 km^{2} (2.60 sq mi), it had a population density of 50.5/km^{2} (130.8/sq mi) in 2021.

== See also ==
- List of communities in New Brunswick
