= Fairfield, New Brunswick =

Coordinates: 45.338588°N 65.686364°W

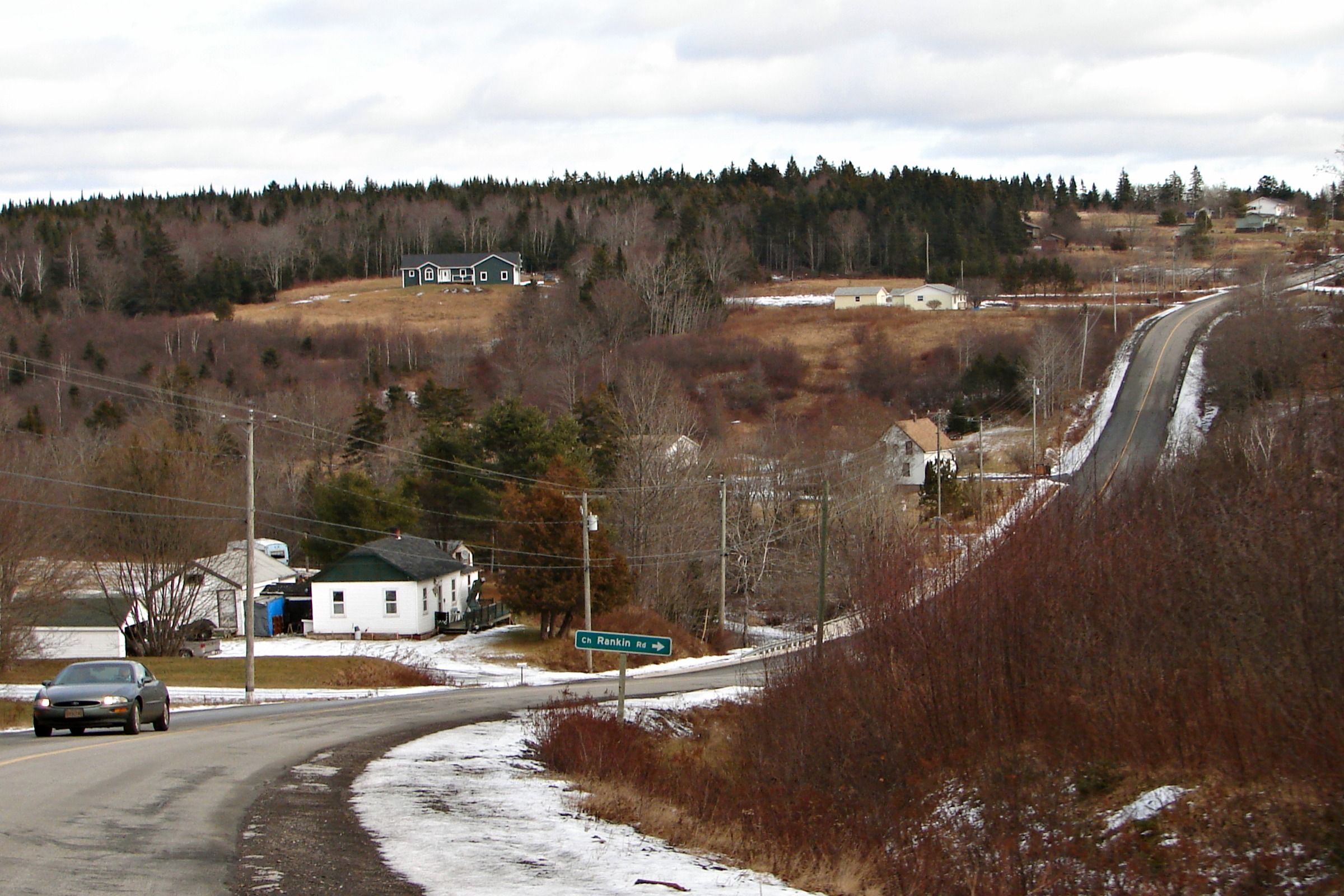

Fairfield is an unincorporated place in New Brunswick, Canada. It is recognized as a designated place by Statistics Canada.

== Demographics ==
In the 2021 Census of Population conducted by Statistics Canada, Fairfield had a population of 295 living in 117 of its 126 total private dwellings, a change of 0.3% from its 2016 population of 294. With a land area of 25.33 km^{2} (9.78 sq mi), it had a population density of 11.6/km^{2} (30.2/sq mi) in 2021.

== See also ==
- List of communities in New Brunswick
