= Pont-Landry, New Brunswick =

Coordinates: 47.577°N 64.948°W

Location of Pont-Landry in New Brunswick

Pont-Landry is a community in Gloucester County, New Brunswick, located at the junction of Inkerman, Saint-Isidore, and Saumarez Parishes. It was grouped with the communities of Boishébert, Gaspereau, and Losier Settlement in 1986 to form the local service district of Pont Landry, which was annexed by the Regional Municipality of Grand Tracadie–Sheila in 2014.

== Demographics ==
In the 2021 Census of Population conducted by Statistics Canada, Pont Landry had a population of 1,278 living in 547 of its 566 total private dwellings, a change of −4% from its 2016 population of 1,331. With a land area of 42.28 km^{2} (16.32 sq mi), it had a population density of 30.2/km^{2} (78.3/sq mi) in 2021.

Population of Pont-Landry
Name	Population (2021)	Population (2016)	Change	Land area (km^{2})	Population density
Pont-Landry part A	679	662	+2.6%	15.34	44.3/km^{2}
Pont-Landry part B	372	402	−7.5%	17.02	21.9/km^{2}
Pont-Landry part C	227	267	−15.0%	9.92	22.9/km^{2}
Total	1,278	1,331	−4.0%	42.28	30.2/km^{2}

== See also ==
- List of communities in New Brunswick
