= Rivière à la Truite, New Brunswick =

Unincorporated place in New Brunswick, Canada

Coordinates: 47.512457°N 64.936238°W

Rivière à la Truite is an unincorporated place in New Brunswick, Canada. It is recognized as a designated place by Statistics Canada.

== Demographics ==
In the 2021 Census of Population conducted by Statistics Canada, Rivière à la Truite had a population of 438 living in 171 of its 181 total private dwellings, a change of 13.2% from its 2016 population of 387. With a land area of 7.04 km^{2} (2.72 sq mi), it had a population density of 62.2/km^{2} (161.1/sq mi) in 2021.

== See also ==
- List of communities in New Brunswick
