= Flatlands, New Brunswick =

Flatlands
- Unincorporated community
- Location of Flatlands, New Brunswick
- Coordinates: 47.983333°N 66.883333°W
- Country: Canada
- Province: New Brunswick
- County: Restigouche
- Parish: Addington
- Electoral Districts Federal: Madawaska—Restigouche
- Provincial: Restigouche West

Government
  - Type: Local service district

Area
  - Land: 18.94 km^{2} (7.31 sq mi)

Population (2016)
  - Total: 143
  - Density: 7.55/km^{2} (19.6/sq mi)
  - Pop 2011-2016: ▼15.9%
  - Dwellings: 83
- Time zone: UTC-4 (AST)
  - Summer (DST): UTC-3 (ADT)
- Postal code(s): E3N: 0A5, 0A8; 4X2-4X3, 4X5-4X6; 5A4
- Area code: 506
- Access Routes: Route 11

Flatlands was a local service district in Addington Parish, Restigouche County, New Brunswick, Canada. The Duncan family of Aberdeen, Scotland were the original settlers of Flatlands and Campbellton. In 1866, Flatlands was a farming and lumbering settlement with approximately 27 resident families. In 1871, it had a population of 150. In 1898, Flatlands was a station on the Intercolonial Railway and had one post office, three stores, a shingle mill, a church, and a population of about 400.

== Geography ==
Flatlands is located along the Restigouche River, opposite the Province of Quebec. It is approximately 5 km from Matapédia, Quebec, a 5-minute drive, and about 15 km from downtown Campbellton, New Brunswick, a 20-minute drive. Route 11 is the major highway running through the community, with a posted speed limit of 80 km/h.

== Demographics ==
In the 2021 Census of Population conducted by Statistics Canada, Flatlands had a population of 153 living in 78 of its 87 total private dwellings, a change of 7% from its 2016 population of 143. With a land area of 18.83 km^{2} (7.27 sq mi), it had a population density of 8.1/km^{2} (21.0/sq mi) in 2021.

Population of Flatlands
Name	Parish	Population (2021)	Population (2016)	Change	Land area (km^{2})	Population density
Flatlands part A	Addington	148	143	+3.5%	15.71	9.4/km^{2}
Flatlands part B	Eldon	5	0	NA	3.12	1.6/km^{2}
Total	—	153	143	+7.0%	18.83	8.1/km^{2}
