= Poirier, New Brunswick =

Coordinates: 47.806276°N 65.056550°W

Poirier is a community in Maple Hills, New Brunswick, Canada. It is recognized as a designated place by Statistics Canada.

== Demographics ==
In the 2021 Census of Population conducted by Statistics Canada, Poirier had a population of 97 living in 48 of its 66 total private dwellings, a change of 16.9% from its 2016 population of 83. With a land area of 7.74 km^{2} (2.99 sq mi), it had a population density of 12.5/km^{2} (32.5/sq mi) in 2021.

== See also ==
- List of communities in New Brunswick
