= Carlisle Road, New Brunswick =

Unincorporated place in Canada

Coordinates: 45.987768°N 66.757210°W

Carlisle Road is an unincorporated place in New Brunswick, Canada. It is recognized as a designated place by Statistics Canada.

== Demographics ==
In the 2021 Census of Population conducted by Statistics Canada, Carlisle Road had a population of 967 living in 362 of its 364 total private dwellings, a change of 4.7% from its 2016 population of 924. With a land area of 4.29 km^{2} (1.66 sq mi), it had a population density of 225.4/km^{2} (583.8/sq mi) in 2021.

== See also ==
- List of communities in New Brunswick
