= Havelock Inside, New Brunswick =

Coordinates: 45.996021°N 65.314153°W

Havelock Inside is an unincorporated place in New Brunswick, Canada. It is recognized as a designated place by Statistics Canada.

== Demographics ==
In the 2021 Census of Population conducted by Statistics Canada, Havelock Inside had a population of 307 living in 127 of its 138 total private dwellings, a change of -1% from its 2016 population of 310. With a land area of 10.04 km^{2} (3.88 sq mi), it had a population density of 30.6/km^{2} (79.2/sq mi) in 2021.

== See also ==
- List of communities in New Brunswick
