= Siegas, New Brunswick =

Coordinates: 47°12′59″N 67°58′36″W

Siegas or Seigas is a community in the Canadian province of New Brunswick.

The special service area and taxing authority within the former local service district of the parish of Sainte-Anne-de-Madawaska used the spelling Seigas.

== Demographics ==
In the 2021 Census of Population conducted by Statistics Canada, Seigas had a population of 185 living in 84 of its 87 total private dwellings, a change of -8% from its 2016 population of 201. With a land area of 5.77 km^{2} (2.23 sq mi), it had a population density of 32.1/km^{2} (83.0/sq mi) in 2021.

== See also ==
- List of communities in New Brunswick
