= Pointe-Brûlée, New Brunswick =

Coordinates: 47.756695°N 64.732389°W

Pointe-Brûlée is an unincorporated place in New Brunswick, Canada. It is recognized as a designated place by Statistics Canada.

== Demographics ==
In the 2021 Census of Population conducted by Statistics Canada, Pointe-Brûlée had a population of 228 living in 107 of its 156 total private dwellings, a change of 3.2% from its 2016 population of 221. With a land area of 2.08 km^{2} (0.80 sq mi), it had a population density of 109.6/km^{2} (283.9/sq mi) in 2021.

== See also ==
- List of communities in New Brunswick
