= Village-Blanchard, New Brunswick =

Coordinates: 47.727°N 64.9013°W

Location of Village-Blanchard in New Brunswick

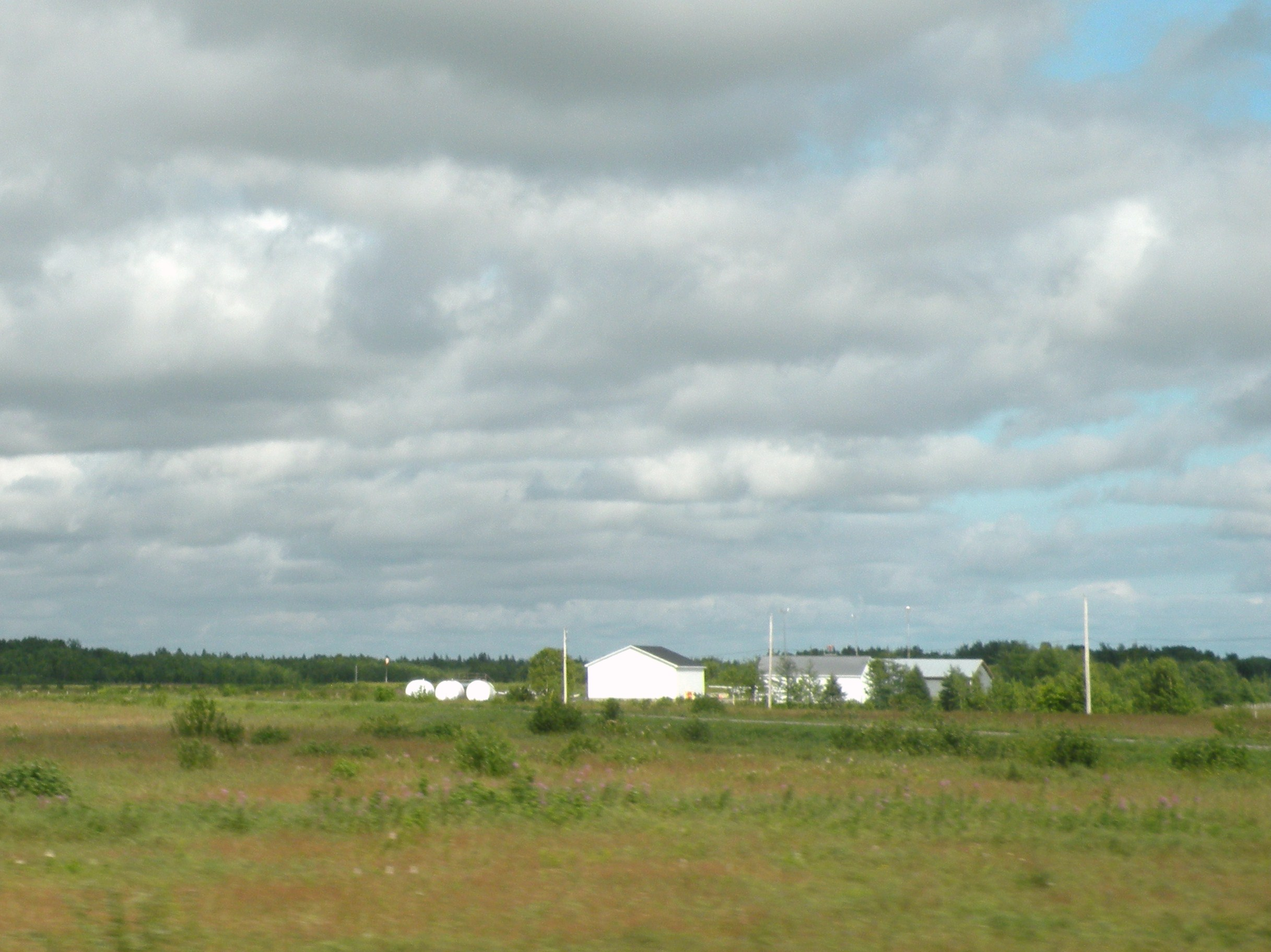
The Pokemouche Airport in Village-Blanchard, New Brunswick

Village-Blanchard is an unincorporated community in New Brunswick, Canada. It was called Blanchard Settlement until 2010.

The former local service district continued to use Blanchard Settlement until its dissolution in New Brunswick's 2023 local governance reforms.

== Demographics ==
In the 2021 Census of Population conducted by Statistics Canada, Blanchard Settlement had a population of 396 living in 183 of its 198 total private dwellings, a change of 0.5% from its 2016 population of 394. With a land area of 28.86 km^{2} (11.14 sq mi), it had a population density of 13.7/km^{2} (35.5/sq mi) in 2021.

== See also ==
- List of communities in New Brunswick
