= Fundy Bay, New Brunswick =

Fundy Bay is an unincorporated place in New Brunswick, Canada. It is recognized as a designated place by Statistics Canada.

== Demographics ==
In the 2021 Census of Population conducted by Statistics Canada, Fundy Bay had a population of 1,236 living in 519 of its 588 total private dwellings, a change of 5.9% from its 2016 population of 1,167. With a land area of 60.19 km^{2} (23.24 sq mi), it had a population density of 20.5/km^{2} (53.2/sq mi) in 2021.

== See also ==
- List of communities in New Brunswick
