= Landry Office, New Brunswick =

Unincorporated place in Canada

Coordinates: 47.670162°N 64.940010°W

Landry Office is an unincorporated place in New Brunswick, Canada. It is recognized as a designated place by Statistics Canada.

== Demographics ==
In the 2021 Census of Population conducted by Statistics Canada, Landry Office had a population of 403 living in 178 of its 215 total private dwellings, a change of −3.4% from its 2016 population of 417. With a land area of 37.75 km^{2} (14.58 sq mi), it had a population density of 10.7/km^{2} (27.6/sq mi) in 2021.

== See also ==
- List of communities in New Brunswick
