= Chiasson-Savoy, New Brunswick =

Unincorporated place in New Brunswick, Canada

Coordinates: 47.745140°N 64.655087°W

Chiasson-Savoy is an unincorporated place in New Brunswick, Canada. It is recognized as a designated place by Statistics Canada.

== Demographics ==
In the 2021 Census of Population conducted by Statistics Canada, Chiasson-Savoy had a population of 462 living in 208 of its 263 total private dwellings, a change of 1.3% from its 2016 population of 456. With a land area of 26.93 km^{2} (10.40 sq mi), it had a population density of 17.2/km^{2} (44.4/sq mi) in 2021.

== See also ==
- List of communities in New Brunswick
