= Maltempec, New Brunswick =

Coordinates: 47.673214°N 64.982242°W

Maltempec is an unincorporated place in New Brunswick, Canada. It is recognized as a designated place by Statistics Canada.

== Demographics ==
In the 2021 Census of Population conducted by Statistics Canada, Maltempec had a population of 307 living in 135 of its 150 total private dwellings, a change of 11.6% from its 2016 population of 275. With a land area of 13.4 km^{2} (5.2 sq mi), it had a population density of 22.9/km^{2} (59.3/sq mi) in 2021.

== See also ==
- List of communities in New Brunswick
