= Saint-André & LeBlanc Office, New Brunswick =

Coordinates: 46.177359°N 64.300713°W

Saint-André & LeBlanc Office is an unincorporated place in New Brunswick, Canada. It is recognized as a designated place by Statistics Canada.

== Demographics ==
In the 2021 Census of Population conducted by Statistics Canada, Saint-André & LeBlanc Office had a population of 461 living in 201 of its 215 total private dwellings, a change of 0.4% from its 2016 population of 459. With a land area of 45.86 km^{2} (17.71 sq mi), it had a population density of 10.1/km^{2} (26.0/sq mi) in 2021.

== See also ==
- List of communities in New Brunswick
