= Gauvreau-Petit Tracadie, New Brunswick =

Coordinates: 47.533168°N 64.963543°W

Gauvreau-Petit Tracadie is an unincorporated place in New Brunswick, Canada. It is recognized as a designated place by Statistics Canada.

== Demographics ==
In the 2021 Census of Population conducted by Statistics Canada, Gauvreau-Petit Tracadie had a population of 415 individuals residing within 179 of its 201 total private dwellings, a change of 0.5% from its 2016 population of 413. With a land area of 14.97 km^{2} (5.78 sq mi), it had a population density of 27.7/km^{2} (71.8/sq mi) in 2021.

== See also ==
- List of communities in New Brunswick
