= Petit-Rocher-Sud, New Brunswick =

Unincorporated place in New Brunswick, Canada

Coordinates: 47.763493°N 65.713779°W

Petit-Rocher-Sud is an unincorporated place in New Brunswick, Canada, located south of Petit-Rocher. It is recognized as a designated place by Statistics Canada.

== Demographics ==
In the 2021 Census of Population conducted by Statistics Canada, Petit-Rocher-Sud had a population of 393 living in 186 of its 208 total private dwellings, a change of -4.4% from its 2016 population of 411. With a land area of 2.2 km^{2} (0.85 sq mi), it had a population density of 178.6/km^{2} (462.7/sq mi) in 2021.

== See also ==
- List of communities in New Brunswick
