= Saumarez, New Brunswick =

Coordinates: 47.5001°N 64.9388°W

Location of Saumarez in New Brunswick

Saumarez is a community and former local service district in Gloucester County, New Brunswick, Canada. It is in Saumarez Parish, now a part of the Regional Municipality of Tracadie.

== Demographics ==
In the 2021 Census of Population conducted by Statistics Canada, Saumarez had a population of 471 living in 204 of its 212 total private dwellings, a change of -6.2% from its 2016 population of 502. With a land area of 3.65 km^{2} (1.41 sq mi), it had a population density of 129.0/km^{2} (334.2/sq mi) in 2021.

== See also ==
- List of communities in New Brunswick
