= Evergreen Park, New Brunswick =

Coordinates: 45.960489°N 66.579090°W

Evergreen Park is an unincorporated place in New Brunswick, Canada. It is recognized as a designated place by Statistics Canada.

== Demographics ==
In the 2021 Census of Population conducted by Statistics Canada, Evergreen Park had a population of 687 living in 237 of its 238 total private dwellings, a change of 1.9% from its 2016 population of 674. With a land area of 3.31 km^{2} (1.28 sq mi), it had a population density of 207.6/km^{2} (537.6/sq mi) in 2021.

== See also ==
- List of communities in New Brunswick
