= Pepper Creek, New Brunswick =

Coordinates: 45.944906°N 66.592281°W

Pepper Creek is an unincorporated place in New Brunswick, Canada. It is recognized as a designated place by Statistics Canada.

== Demographics ==
In the 2021 Census of Population conducted by Statistics Canada, Pepper Creek had a population of 772 living in 272 of its 281 total private dwellings, a change of -3.7% from its 2016 population of 802. With a land area of 1.73 km^{2} (0.67 sq mi), it had a population density of 446.2/km^{2} (1,155.8/sq mi) in 2021.

== See also ==
- List of communities in New Brunswick
