= Leech, New Brunswick =

Coordinates: 47.453239°N 64.981838°W

Leech is an unincorporated place in New Brunswick, Canada. It is recognized as a designated place by Statistics Canada.

== Demographics ==
In the 2021 Census of Population conducted by Statistics Canada, Leech had a population of 635 living in 263 of its 284 total private dwellings, a change of 4.4% from its 2016 population of 608. With a land area of 79.04 km^{2} (30.52 sq mi), it had a population density of 8.0/km^{2} (20.8/sq mi) in 2021.

== See also ==
- List of communities in New Brunswick
