= Petit-Rocher-Nord (Devereaux), New Brunswick =

Unincorporated place in New Brunswick, Canada

Coordinates: 47.809471°N 65.732633°W

Petit-Rocher-Nord, also known as Devereaux, is an unincorporated place in New Brunswick, Canada, located north of Petit-Rocher. It is recognized as a designated place by Statistics Canada.

== Demographics ==
In the 2021 Census of Population conducted by Statistics Canada, Petit-Rocher-Nord (Deveraux) had a population of 577 living in 245 of its 257 total private dwellings, a change of 0.9% from its 2016 population of 572. With a land area of 8.69 km^{2} (3.36 sq mi), it had a population density of 66.4/km^{2} (172.0/sq mi) in 2021.

== See also ==
- List of communities in New Brunswick
