= Petite-Lamèque, New Brunswick =

Coordinates: 47.823936°N 64.683866°W

Petite-Lamèque is an unincorporated place in New Brunswick, Canada. It is recognized as a designated place by Statistics Canada.

== Demographics ==
In the 2021 Census of Population conducted by Statistics Canada, Petite-Lamèque had a population of 356 living in 180 of its 194 total private dwellings, a change of -2.2% from its 2016 population of 364. With a land area of 9.18 km^{2} (3.54 sq mi), it had a population density of 38.8/km^{2} (100.4/sq mi) in 2021.

== See also ==
- List of communities in New Brunswick
