= Madran, New Brunswick =

Coordinates: 47°49′01″N 65°46′20″W

Madran was a local service district in the Canadian province of New Brunswick. It is now part of the town of Belle-Baie. As of 2016, Madran had a population of 260.

== Demographics ==
In the 2021 Census of Population conducted by Statistics Canada, Madran had a population of 263 living in 129 of its 135 total private dwellings, a change of 1.2% from its 2016 population of 260. With a land area of 15.23 km^{2} (5.88 sq mi), it had a population density of 17.3/km^{2} (44.7/sq mi) in 2021.

== See also ==
- List of communities in New Brunswick
