= Inkerman Centre, New Brunswick =

Coordinates: 47.667259°N 64.825170°W

Inkerman Centre is an unincorporated place in New Brunswick, Canada. It is recognized as a designated place by Statistics Canada.

== Demographics ==
In the 2021 Census of Population conducted by Statistics Canada, Inkerman Centre had a population of 788 living in 341 of its 370 total private dwellings, a change of -3.4% from its 2016 population of 816. With a land area of 27.58 km^{2} (10.65 sq mi), it had a population density of 28.6/km^{2} (74.0/sq mi) in 2021.

== See also ==
- List of communities in New Brunswick
