= Tracadie, New Brunswick =

Tracadie
- Regional municipality
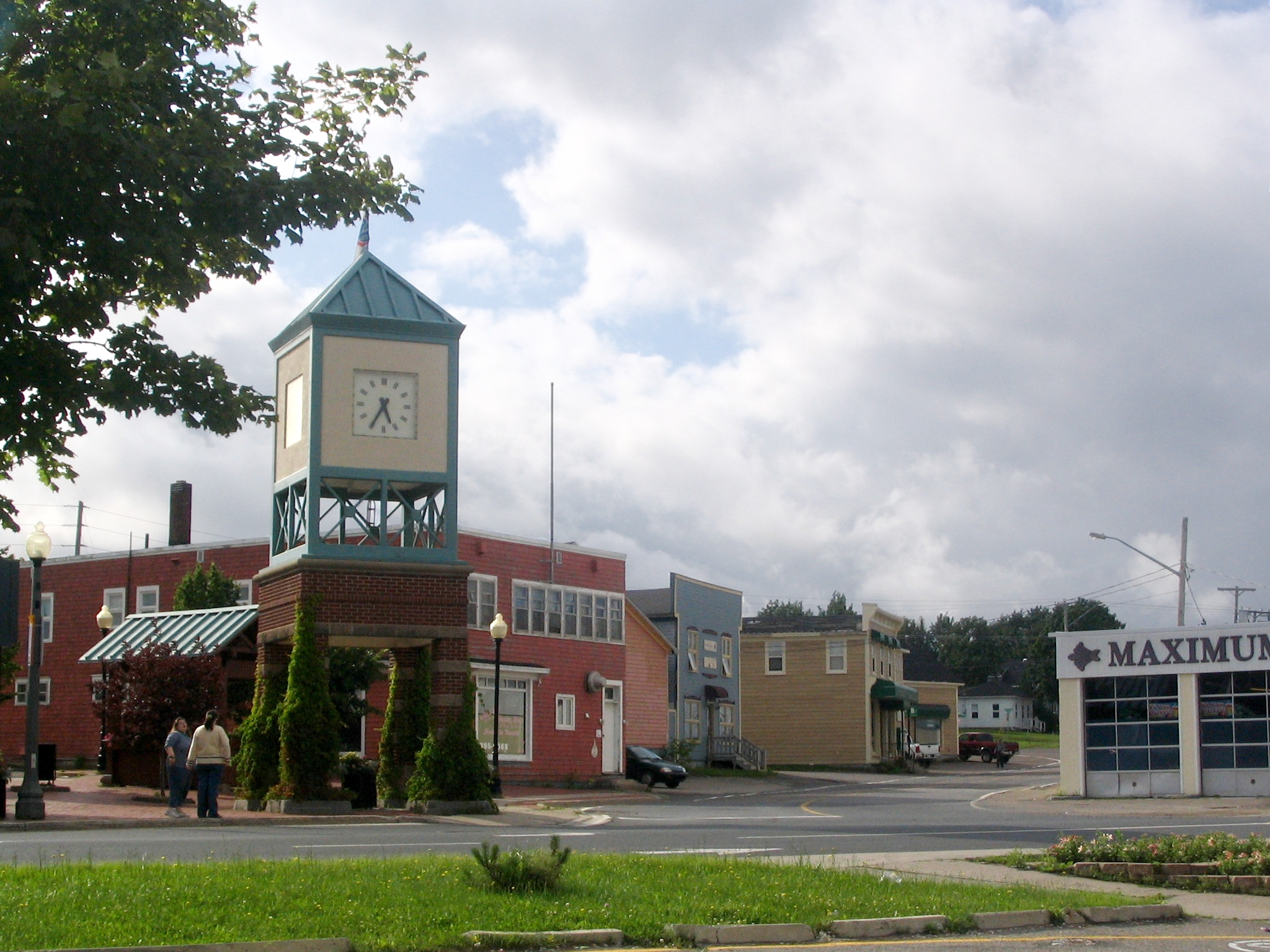
- Downtown Tracadie

- Location within New Brunswick.
- Coordinates: 47.51239°N 64.91010°W
- Country: Canada
- Province: New Brunswick
- County: Gloucester
- Regional municipality: July 1, 2014

Government
  - Mayor: Clifford Robichaud

Area
  - Land: 516.55 km^{2} (199.44 sq mi)

Population (2021)
  - Total: 16,043
  - Density: 31.1/km^{2} (81/sq mi)
  - Change (2016–21): ▼0.4%
- Time zone: UTC-4 (AST)
  - Summer (DST): UTC-3 (ADT)
- Postal code(s): E1X
- Area code: 506: Area exchanges: 394
- Website: tracadie-sheila.ca

The Regional Municipality of Tracadie (French pronunciation: [tʁakadi]) is the first and only regional municipality in the province of New Brunswick, Canada.

== History ==
Tracadie and Sheila were separate communities whose municipal governments were merged into the Town of Grand Tracadie-Sheila on January 1, 1992. The new entity also encompassed a non-incorporated sector north of the town which was located in the civil parish of Saumarez. In total, the new town of Tracadie-Sheila counted some 4,200 inhabitants upon creation. There were several reasons for this amalgamation. The towns of Tracadie and Sheila shared contiguous borders and several common services such as recreation and police services, and their amalgamation resulted in savings in administrative costs by eliminating a duplication of administrative services, fire services and public works.

In July 2014, the Regional Municipality (RM) of Grand Tracadie–Sheila was formed through a municipal restructuring process of the former Town of Tracadie–Sheila, eighteen local service districts (LSDs) and portions of two other LSDs. The eighteen LSDs that were included in their entirety were Benoit, Brantville, Gauvreau-Petit Tracadie, Haut-Sheila, Leech, the parish of Inkerman, the parish of Saumarez, Pointe-à-Bouleau, Pont LaFrance, Pont Landry, Portage River-Tracadie Beach, Rivière à la Truite, Saint Irénée and Alderwood, Saint-Pons, Sainte-Rose, Saumarez, Upper Portage River (Haut-Rivière-du-Portage), and Val-Comeau. The two LSDs with portions incorporated into the RM were Inkerman Centre and Tabusintac. The amalgamation followed a plebiscite that was held in December 2013.

The first election of the new municipality of Grand Tracadie-Sheila was held on May 12, 2014, and the new municipality was officially incorporated on July 1, 2014, with the understanding that the new regional municipal council would consider another town name for the long-term.

On June 15, 2015, the municipality of Grand Tracadie-Sheila officially changed its name to Tracadie, following an amendment to a regulation under the provincial Municipalities Act. The change reflects the historic identity of the area and the name of the two main rivers that flow through the municipality.

== Demographics ==
In the 2021 Census of Population conducted by Statistics Canada, Tracadie had a population of 16,043 living in 7,113 of its 7,539 total private dwellings, a change of −0.4% from its 2016 population of 16,114. With a land area of 516.55 km^{2} (199.44 sq mi), it had a population density of 31.1/km^{2} (80.4/sq mi) in 2021.

== Education ==
Tracadie is home to four French schools: the École La Ruche (a kindergarten to grade 5 primary school), the École La Source (a kindergarten to grade 8 primary school), the École Le Tremplin (grades 6, 7 and 8), and the Polyvalente W.-A. Losier, a high school (grades 9 to 12). The public library is located in the Hotel de ville, where the old hospital once stood.

== Government ==
The council of the RM of Tracadie comprises eleven elected officials including a mayor and ten councillors. The councillors represent eight wards. Six of the wards are rural in nature and are represented by one councillor each. The remaining two wards are urban in nature and are represented by two councillors each. The current mayor is Denis Losier, a retired 55-year-old school principal who was a rookie politician when he was elected in 2016.

== See also ==
- List of communities in New Brunswick
- List of municipalities in New Brunswick
