= Tremblay, New Brunswick =

Coordinates: 47.7478°N 65.7578°W

Tremblay is a community in the Canadian province of New Brunswick on Route 315 and Route 11.

The former local service district of Tremblay took its name from the community.

== Demographics ==
In the 2021 Census of Population conducted by Statistics Canada, Tremblay had a population of 463 living in 195 of its 199 total private dwellings, a change of 0.9% from its 2016 population of 459. With a land area of 6.58 km^{2} (2.54 sq mi), it had a population density of 70.4/km^{2} (182.2/sq mi) in 2021.

== See also ==
- List of communities in New Brunswick
