= Coteau Road, New Brunswick =

Coordinates: 47.835914°N 64.557713°W

Coteau Road is an unincorporated place in New Brunswick, Canada. It is recognized as a designated place by Statistics Canada.

== Demographics ==
In the 2021 Census of Population conducted by Statistics Canada, Coteau Road had a population of 393 living in 184 of its 199 total private dwellings, a change of -4.1% from its 2016 population of 410. With a land area of 14.74 km^{2} (5.69 sq mi), it had a population density of 26.7/km^{2} (69.1/sq mi) in 2021.

== See also ==
- List of communities in New Brunswick
