= Pointe-Alexandre, New Brunswick =

Coordinates: 47.805551°N 64.668796°W

Pointe-Alexandre is an unincorporated place in New Brunswick, Canada. It is recognized as a designated place by Statistics Canada.

== Demographics ==
In the 2021 Census of Population conducted by Statistics Canada, Pointe-Alexandre had a population of 347 living in 160 of its 237 total private dwellings, a change of 14.5% from its 2016 population of 303. With a land area of 6.19 km^{2} (2.39 sq mi), it had a population density of 56.1/km^{2} (145.2/sq mi) in 2021.

== See also ==
- List of communities in New Brunswick
