= Val-Comeau, New Brunswick =

Coordinates: 47.461°N 64.880°W

Location of Val-Comeau in New Brunswick

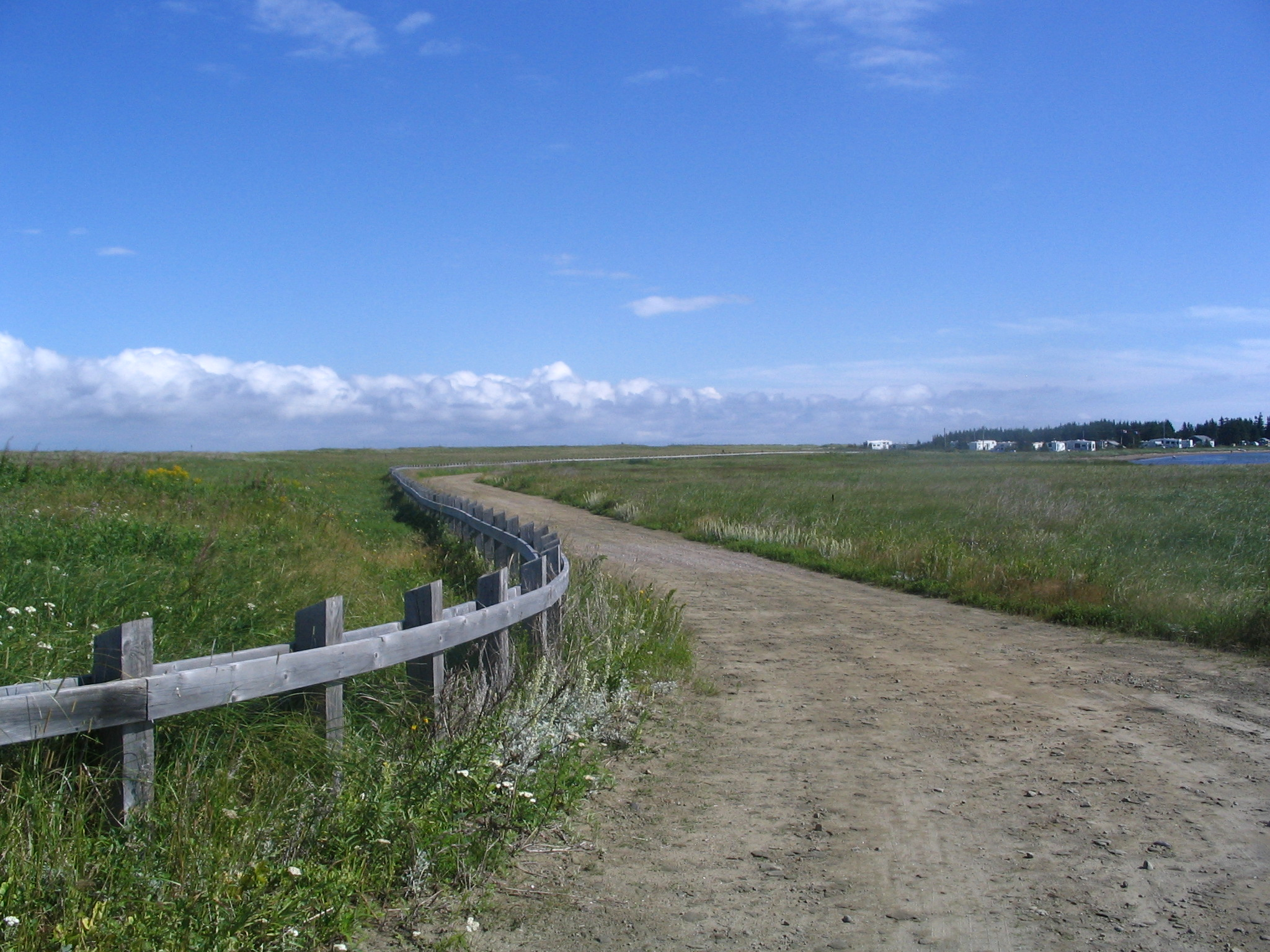
The provincial park of Val-Comeau, New Brunswick, Canada.

Val-Comeau was a settlement and local service district in New Brunswick. It is now part of the Regional Municipality of Grand Tracadie–Sheila.

== Demographics ==
In the 2021 Census of Population conducted by Statistics Canada, Val-Comeau had a population of 745 living in 344 of its 398 total private dwellings, a change of −3.2% from its 2016 population of 770. With a land area of 8.16 km^{2} (3.15 sq mi), it had a population density of 91.3/km^{2} (236.5/sq mi) in 2021.

Population of Val-Comeau
Name	Population (2021)	Population (2016)	Change	Land area (km^{2})	Population density
Val-Comeau part A	745	770	−3.2%	6.22	119.8/km^{2}
Val Comeau part B	0	0	NA	1.94	0.0/km^{2}
Total	745	770	−3.2%	8.16	91.3/km^{2}

== See also ==
- List of communities in New Brunswick
