= Benoit, New Brunswick =

Coordinates: 47.486477°N 64.961039°W

Benoit is an unincorporated place in New Brunswick, Canada. It is recognized as a designated place by Statistics Canada.

== Demographics ==
In the 2021 Census of Population conducted by Statistics Canada, Benoit had a population of 161 living in 73 of its 74 total private dwellings, a change of -18.7% from its 2016 population of 198. With a land area of 3.69 km^{2} (1.42 sq mi), it had a population density of 43.6/km^{2} (113.0/sq mi) in 2021.

== See also ==
- List of communities in New Brunswick
