= Haut-Lamèque, New Brunswick =

Coordinates: 47.791425°N 64.616602°W

A view of road 113 in Haut-Lamèque, New Brunswick, Canada.

Haut-Lamèque is an unincorporated place in New Brunswick, Canada. It is recognized as a designated place by Statistics Canada.

== Demographics ==
In the 2021 Census of Population conducted by Statistics Canada, Haut-Lamèque had a population of 278 living in 122 of its 134 total private dwellings, a change of −2.5% from its 2016 population of 285. With a land area of 8.29 km^{2} (3.20 sq mi), it had a population density of 33.5/km^{2} (86.9/sq mi) in 2021.

== See also ==
- List of communities in New Brunswick
