= Saint-Pons, New Brunswick =

Coordinates: 47.477722°N 64.961509°W

Saint-Pons is an unincorporated place in New Brunswick, Canada. It is recognized as a designated place by Statistics Canada.

== Demographics ==
In the 2021 Census of Population conducted by Statistics Canada, Saint-Pons had a population of 254 living in 116 of its 119 total private dwellings, a change of -20.4% from its 2016 population of 319. With a land area of 8.49 km^{2} (3.28 sq mi), it had a population density of 29.9/km^{2} (77.5/sq mi) in 2021.

== See also ==
- List of communities in New Brunswick
