= Cap-Bateau, New Brunswick =

Coordinates: 47.812132°N 64.537753°W

Cap-Bateau is an unincorporated place in New Brunswick, Canada. It is recognized as a designated place by Statistics Canada.

== Demographics ==
In the 2021 Census of Population conducted by Statistics Canada, Cap-Bateau had a population of 229 living in 104 of its 117 total private dwellings, a change of -12.6% from its 2016 population of 262. With a land area of 5.28 km^{2} (2.04 sq mi), it had a population density of 43.4/km^{2} (112.3/sq mi) in 2021.

== See also ==
- List of communities in New Brunswick
