= Brantville, New Brunswick =

Coordinates: 47.37557°N 64.971085°W

Location of Brantville in New Brunswick

Brantville is a neighbourhood in the Regional Municipality of Grand Tracadie–Sheila, in Northumberland County, New Brunswick, Canada.

It is named for the brant goose. Brant Island is located offshore.

== Demographics ==
In the 2021 Census of Population conducted by Statistics Canada, Brantville had a population of 891 living in 380 of its 392 total private dwellings, a change of -1.3% from its 2016 population of 903. With a land area of 39.46 km^{2} (15.24 sq mi), it had a population density of 22.6/km^{2} (58.5/sq mi) in 2021.

== See also ==
- List of communities in New Brunswick
