= Pigeon Hill, New Brunswick =

Coordinates: 47.847744°N 64.511485°W

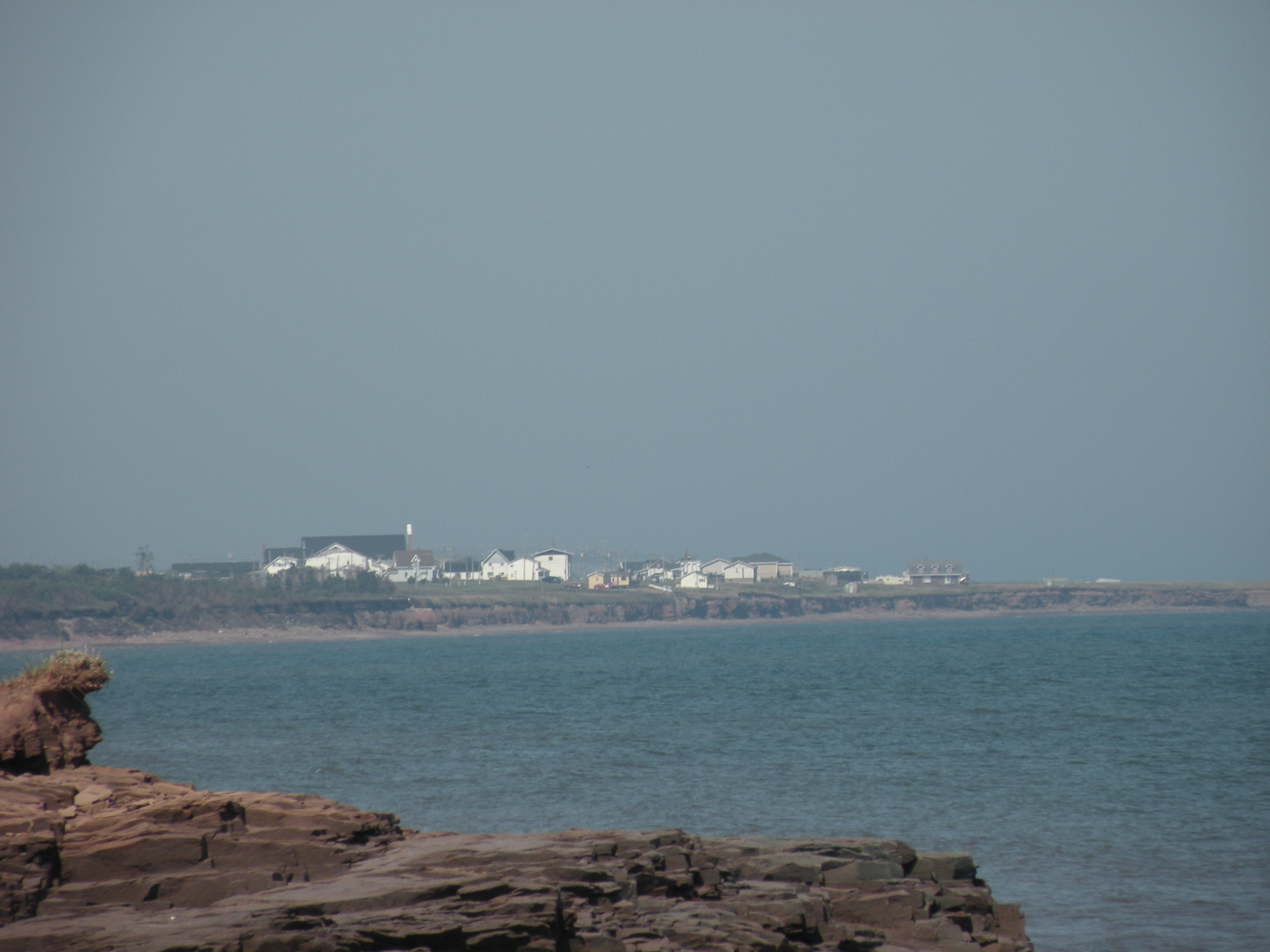
Pigeon Hill, New Brunswick, Canada, as seen from Cap-Bateau.

Pigeon Hill is an unincorporated place in New Brunswick, Canada. It is recognized as a designated place by Statistics Canada.

== Demographics ==
In the 2021 Census of Population conducted by Statistics Canada, Pigeon Hill had a population of 436 living in 202 of its 227 total private dwellings, a change of -1.6% from its 2016 population of 443. With a land area of 9.84 km^{2} (3.80 sq mi), it had a population density of 44.3/km^{2} (114.8/sq mi) in 2021.

== See also ==
- List of communities in New Brunswick
