= Atlantic Northeast =

Coordinates: 43.6806°N 70.7336°W

- Region
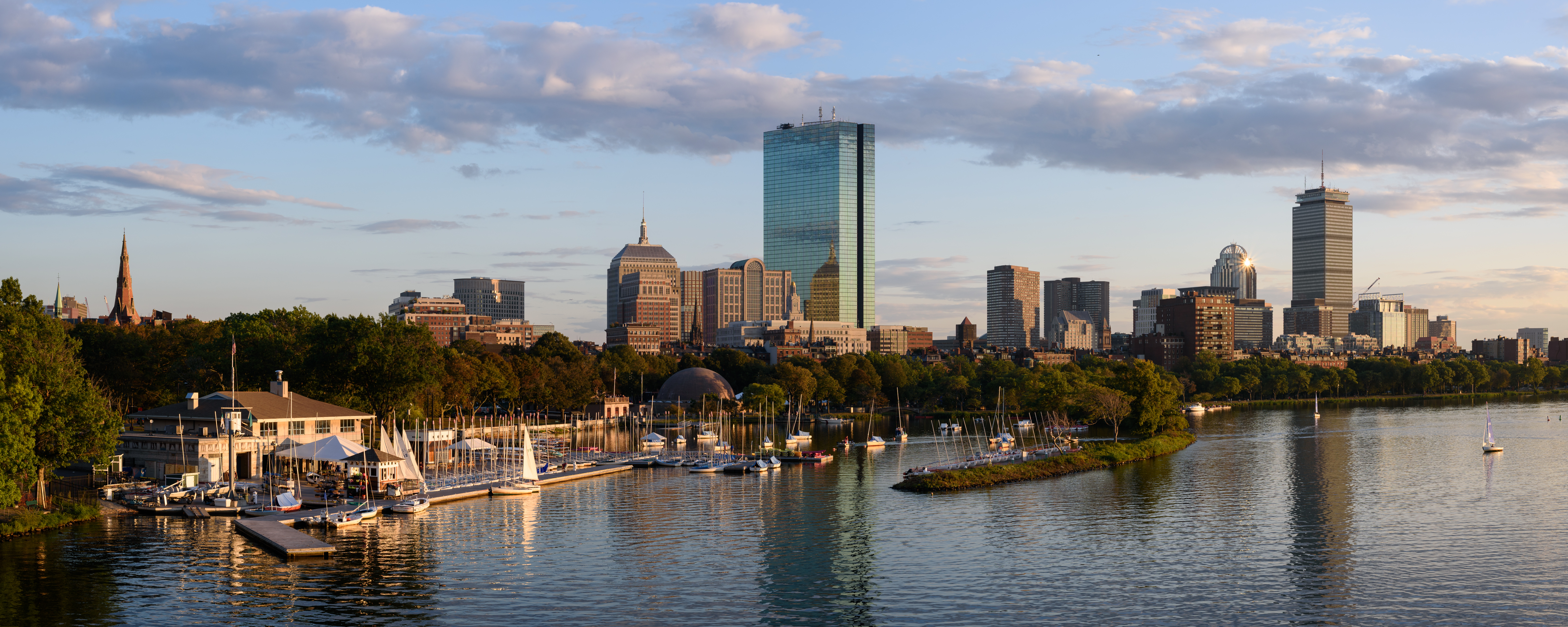
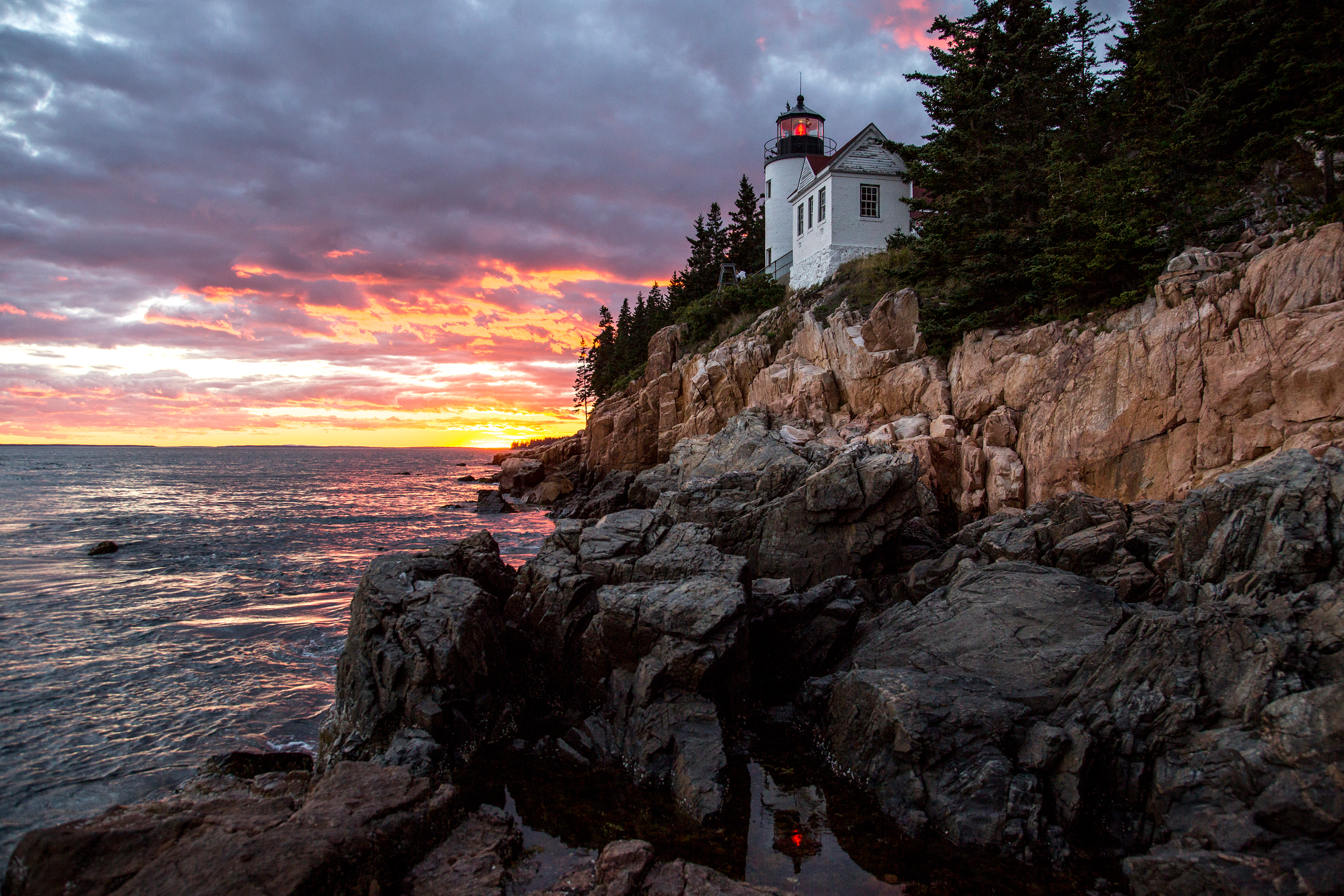
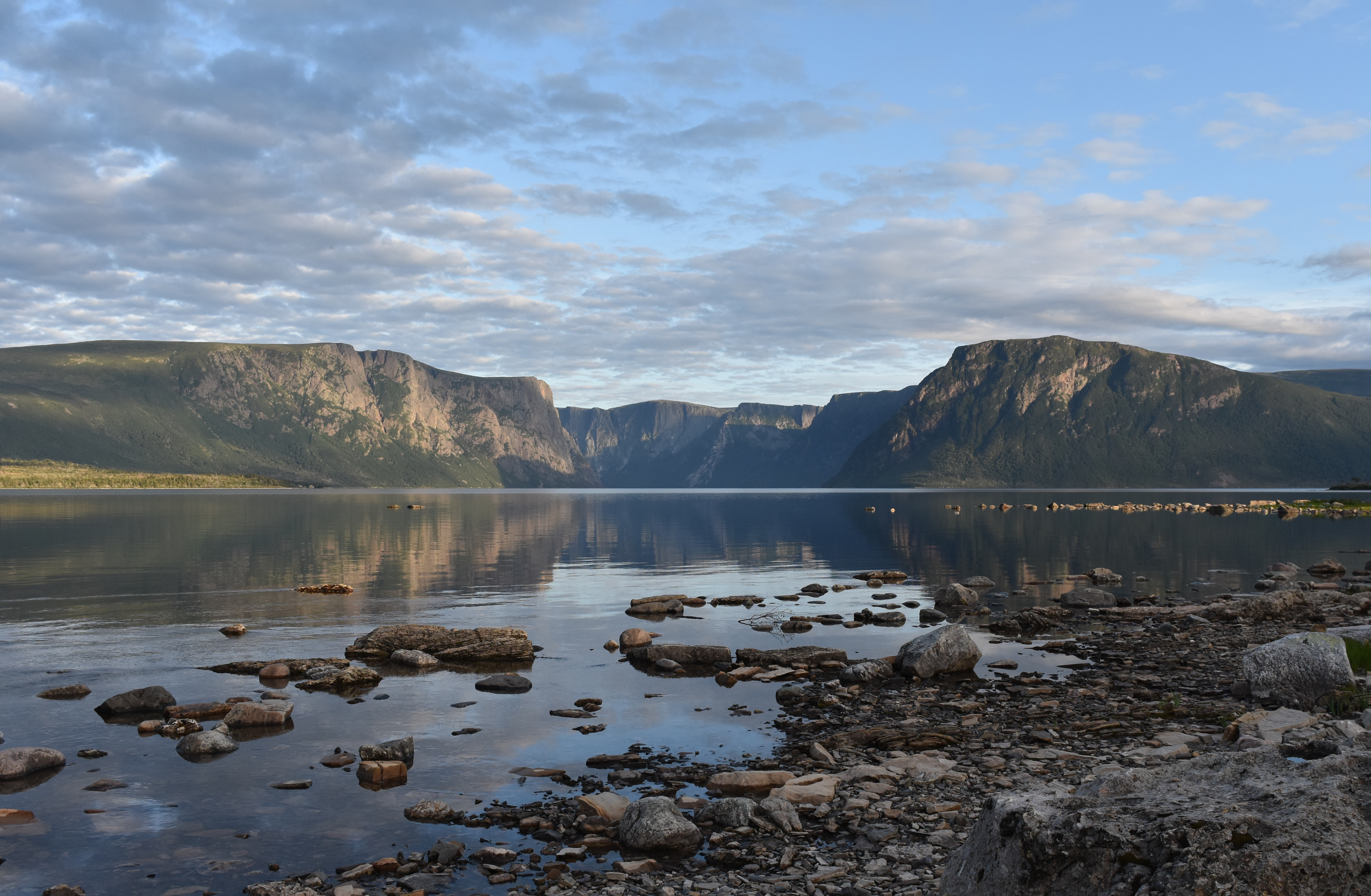
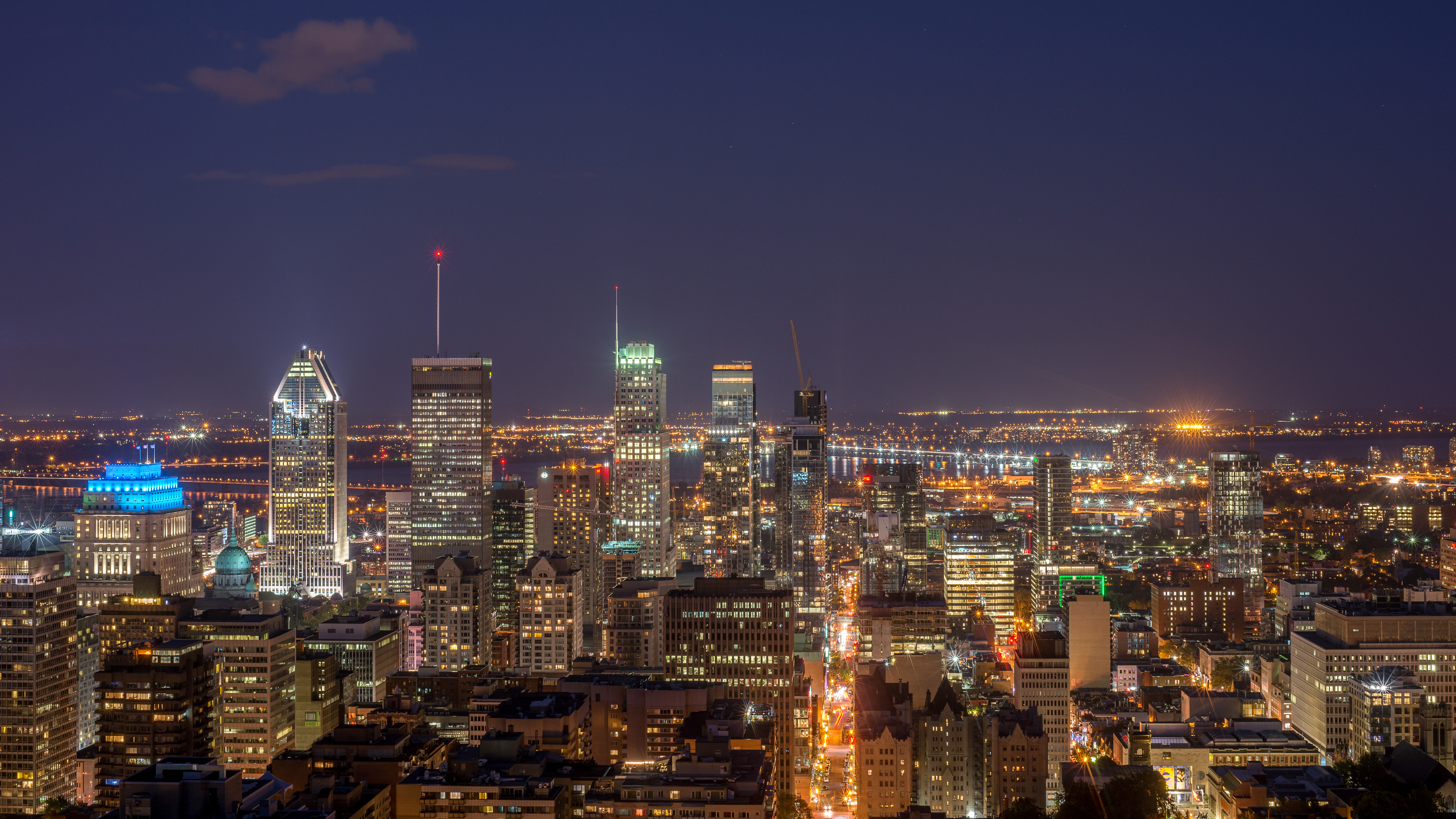
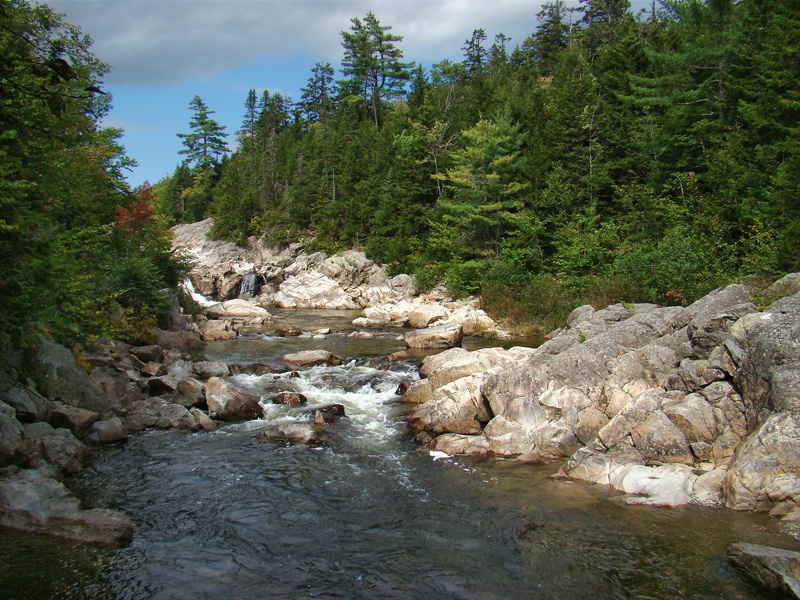
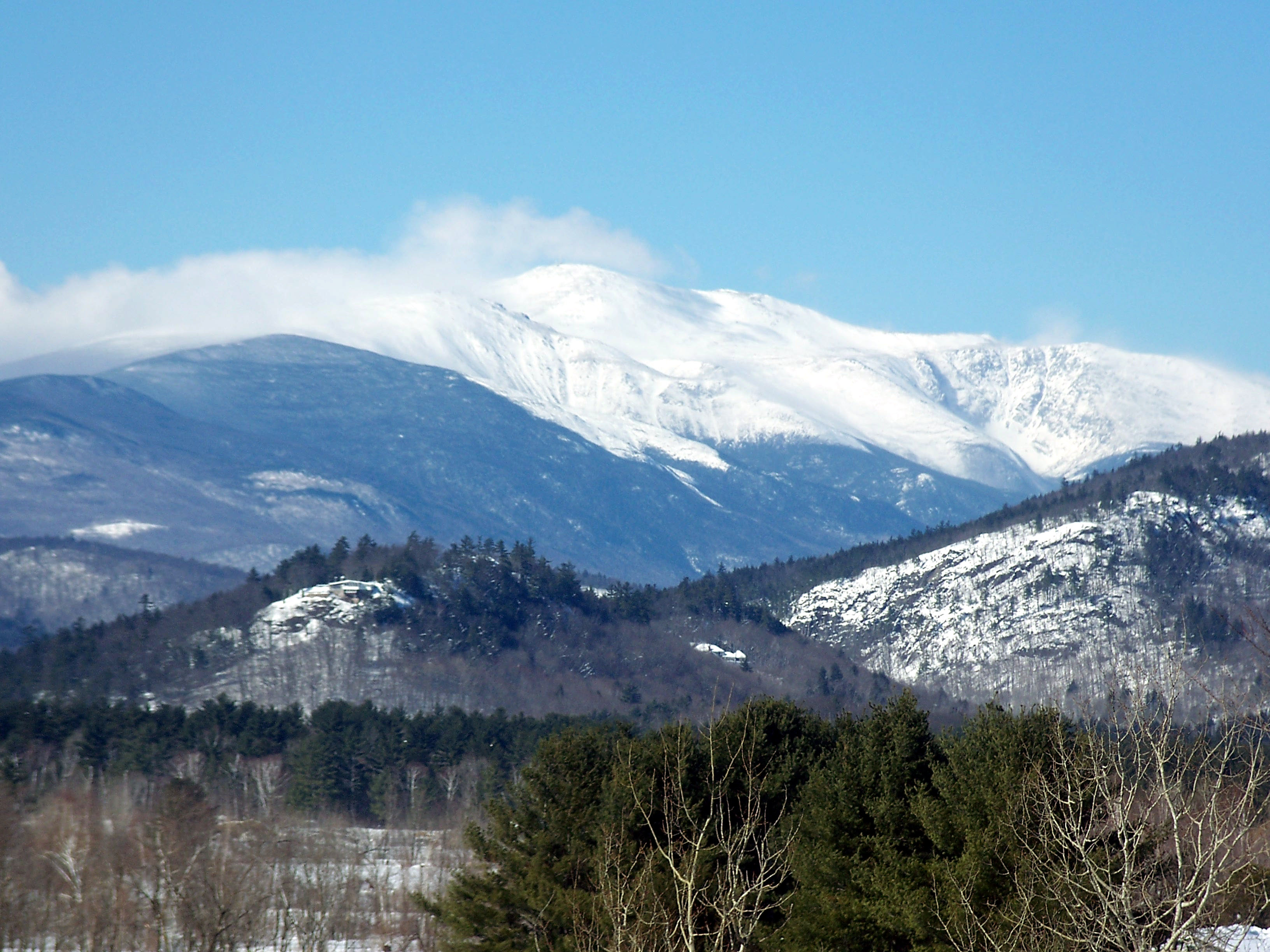
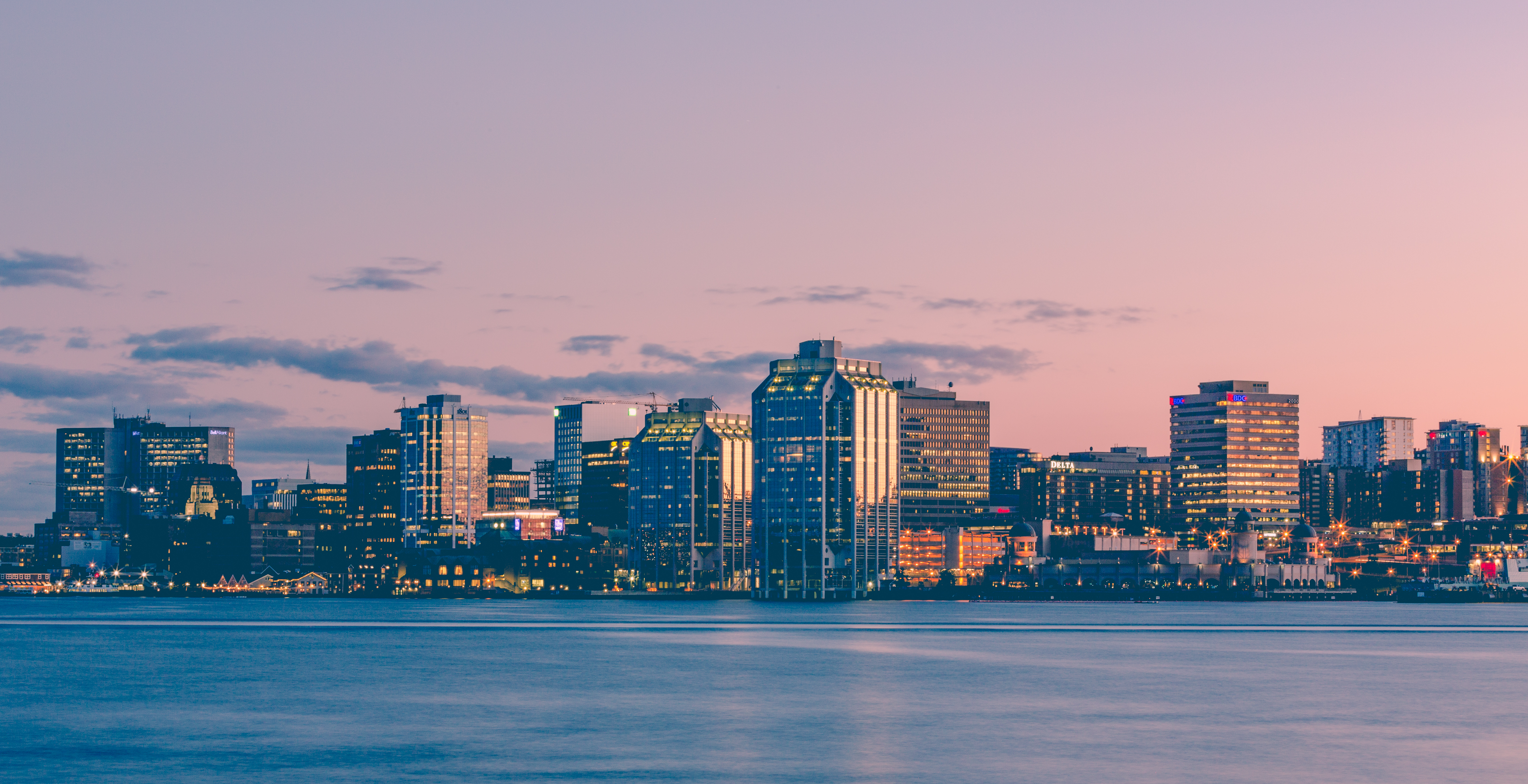
- Left-right from top: Boston skyline, Bass Harbor Head Light, Western Brook Pond, Montreal skyline, Fundy National Park, Mount Washington, Halifax skyline
- Nickname: Atlantica
- Countries: Canada and United States
- States/Provinces: Connecticut; Maine; Massachusetts; New Brunswick; New Hampshire; Newfoundland and Labrador; Nova Scotia; Prince Edward Island; Quebec; Rhode Island; Vermont
- Territories: Wabanaki Confederacy; Mi'kma'ki; Wolastokuk; Ndakinna; Peskotomuhkatik; Pαnawαhpskewahki
- Largest metropolitan areas: Greater Boston; Greater Montreal; Greater Providence
- Languages: Indigenous languages: Abenaki; Algonquin; East Cree; Innu-aimun; Kanienʼkéha; Mi'kawi'simk; Naskapi; New Massachusett; Passamaquoddy; Wəlastəkwey; Wendat; English dialects: Aboriginal English; Afro-Nova Scotian English; Atlantic Canadian English; Black English; Lunenburg English; Newfoundland English; New England English; Quebec English; French dialects: Acadian French; Brayon French; Chaouin; Chiac; Joual; Màgoua; New England French; Newfoundland French; Quebec French; Manual languages: American Sign Language (ASL); Langue des signes québécoise (LSQ); Maritime Sign Language (MSL); Black American Sign Language (BASL); Protactile; Other languages: Canadian Gaelic; Newfoundland Irish

The Atlantic Northeast (French: Atlantique nord-est) is a geographic and cultural region of eastern North America bounded by the Atlantic Ocean to the east and (loosely) by the Saint Lawrence River to the northwest. Though no official boundary exists, the most common conception includes the Maritime provinces, southern Quebec, and the island of Newfoundland in Canada, and the New England region of the United States. Broader conceptions reach further north into Canada, including Labrador and the Côte-Nord region of Quebec. Narrower conceptions may be limited to the coastal areas east of the Appalachian Mountains. The variety of definitions can be attributed to overlapping commonalities of the region's history, culture, geography, ecology, society, and other factors.

== Definition ==
The term "Atlantic Northeast" should not be confused with Atlantic Canada, which includes the entirety of New Brunswick, Newfoundland and Labrador, Nova Scotia, and Prince Edward Island, but excludes Quebec. It should also not be confused with the northeastern portion of the Atlantic Ocean.

== History ==
The predominant nations in the region over the course of the estimated last 11,000 years have been the Abenaki, Penobscot, Mi'kmaq, Wolastoqiyik, and Passamaquoddy, all of whom were later associated with the Wabanaki Confederacy. These nations' countries mainly overlapped the soon-to-be Maritime provinces, such as Mi'kma'ki and Wolastokuk with New Brunswick, Nova Scotia, and Prince Edward Island, as well as Ndakinna, Peskotomuhkatik, and Pαnawαhpskewahki with Vermont, New Hampshire, and Massachusetts.

Before 1620 the conflicts between First Nations and English settlers started due to the alienation of tribes; they also kidnapped members of the tribes through violence. The violence confused many Indigenous nations because they also traded with proper settlers, but this left the First Nations resentful of the European nations.The presence of the French and English in the Atlantic Northeast attracted the Dutch to begin trading on the Hudson River with different peoples. The new presence of these traders also brought unwanted microbes, viruses, and bacteria that took a disastrous toll on the Indigenous populations. When smallpox swept the New England area in 1610, the native population hit an all-time low, since they were trying to fight off a virus that was not indigenous to the area. Eventually the population recovered but not completely. After the outbreak settlers became highly interested in the Wabanaki beaver pelts, which they would trade for glass, metal, and weapons.

During the period of the expulsion of the Acadians, thousands were deported from the present-day Canadian provinces of Nova Scotia, New Brunswick, and PEI, as well as from northern Maine — parts of the French region called Acadie — into the Thirteen Colonies, from 1755 until 1758. Large parts of Nova Scotia were subsequently resettled by new arrivals from New England before 1775. At the end of the American Revolution, nearly 75,000 Loyalists resettled in Nova Scotia, New Brunswick and Québec. Close to 3,500 free African Americans went to Nova Scotia. Before 1860, about 30,000–40,000 black people entered Canada, many of them joining the previous group in Nova Scotia, either free or as escaped slaves through the Underground Railroad. From the mid-19th century until the Great Depression in the 1930s, nearly 900,000 French Canadians emigrated from Québec to the U.S. Two-thirds went into New England mill towns.

== Geography ==
Major geographical features of the Atlantic Northeast include the Appalachian Mountains, the Green Mountains, the Atlantic Ocean, Long Island Sound, the Gulf of Maine, the Gulf of Saint Lawrence, the Bay of Fundy, the Merrimack River, the Boston Harbor, the Taunton River, the Blackstone River, the Connecticut River, the Housatonic River, and the Hoosic River.

=== Border disputes ===
The "Gray Zone" is an area of land and sea which is claimed by both Canada and the United States. It is located off the coasts of New Brunswick and Maine. The only land within this area are two islands, Machias Seal Island and North Rock. The "Gray Zone" is one of four areas between the two countries whose sovereignty is still in dispute, but is the only one of the disputed areas containing land. In 1979, both countries filed a joint application to the International Court of Justice to avoid having the dispute settled when oceanic boundaries in the area were set for mineral and fishing rights. Canadians have had a continuous presence in the area since 1832 when a lighthouse was built.

=== Places of interest ===
The Maritimes in the Atlantic Northeast

Northeast Canyons and Seamounts Marine National Monument is located 150 miles (240 km) off the shore of Cape Cod. The national monument comprises 4,900 square miles (13,000 km^{2}) of underwater canyons carved into the continental shelf, and has an underwater mountain rising 7,000 feet (2,100 m) above the ocean floor. This monument is home to many marine species, fish, whales, and dolphins. The monument was formed by a declaration by President Barack Obama.

Salem, Massachusetts, is a famous location in New England known primarily for the Salem witch trials. It was also one of Massachusetts' wealthiest ports for trading in the late 18th century.

Acadia National Park is on Mount Desert Island in Maine, with 47,000 acres (19,000 ha) of woodlands, rocky shoreline, trails, camping, and wildlife. The park is home to Cadillac Mountain, the highest mountain on the east coast of the United States.

== Climate ==
The Atlantic Northeast region has a four-season climate. In the New England region of the United States, summers are hot with an average temperature of 80–85 °F (27–29 °C) in late June through August. In the fall the air is cool, with temperatures from 45 to 50 °F (7 to 10 °C), and in the spring it tends to be rainy, with temperatures from 40 to 60 °F (4 to 16 °C). In the winter there tends to be a lot of snowfall averaging around 35 inches (890 mm) per year. The typical temperature in this area during the winter is around 25 °F (−4 °C). The Canadian Maritimes have seasons very similar to the New England areas. New Brunswick has cold winters ranging from approximately 19–31 °F (−7 – −1 °C) and hot summers with temperatures from 72 to 77 °F (22 to 25 °C). Prince Edward Island has a climate similar to New Brunswick with temperatures ranging from 46 to 71 °F (8 to 22 °C) in the summer and 11 to 26 °F (−12 to −3 °C) in the winter. In the summer in Nova Scotia temperatures will reach around 75 °F (24 °C), and in the winter temperatures will drop as low as 24 °F (−4 °C).

== Demographics ==
Most of the region's population is concentrated in southwestern New England and the Saint Lawrence Lowlands of Quebec, both of which form the northern part of their respective country's largest megalopolises. The region's largest metropolitan areas are Greater Boston, Massachusetts, with 4.8 million people; Greater Montreal, Quebec, with 4.1 million people; Greater Providence, Rhode Island, with 1.62 million people; and Greater Hartford, Connecticut, with 1.21 million people.

=== Largest cities and metropolitan areas ===
This is a list of the most populous cities and metropolitan areas in the Atlantic Northeast based on the 2016 Canadian census and United States Census Bureau population estimates as of July 1, 2019.

City	State/Province	Population	Metropolitan area
Montreal	Quebec	1,704,694	4,098,927
Boston	Massachusetts	692,600	4,875,390
Quebec City	Quebec	531,902	800,296
Laval	Quebec	422,993	(Note: Part of Greater Montreal.)
Halifax	Nova Scotia	316,701	403,131
Longueuil	Quebec	239,700	
Worcester	Massachusetts	185,428	923,672
Providence	Rhode Island	179,883	1,609,359
St. John's	Newfoundland and Labrador	178,427	205,955
Sherbrooke	Quebec	161,323	212,105
Springfield	Massachusetts	153,606	692,942
Saguenay	Quebec	145,949	160,980
Bridgeport	Connecticut	144,399	939,904
Lévis	Quebec	143,414	(Note: Part of the Communauté métropolitaine de Québec.)
Trois-Rivières	Quebec	134,413	156,042
New Haven	Connecticut	130,250	862,477
Stamford	Connecticut	129,638	(Note: Part of Greater Bridgeport.)
Hartford	Connecticut	122,105	1,214,295
Cambridge	Massachusetts	118,927	(Note: Part of Greater Boston.)
Manchester	New Hampshire	112,673	406,678
Terrebonne	Quebec	111,575	
Lowell	Massachusetts	110,997	
Moncton	New Brunswick	108,620	144,810
Waterbury	Connecticut	107,568	(Note: Part of Greater New Haven.)
Dartmouth	Nova Scotia	72,139	(Note: Part of Greater Halifax.)
Saint John	New Brunswick	69,895	130,613
Fredericton	New Brunswick	63,116	108,610
Norwich	Connecticut	40,125	274,055
Charlottetown	Prince Edward Island	38,809	78,858
Sydney	Nova Scotia	30,960	93,694 (Note: Part of Cape Breton Regional Municipality)
Dieppe	New Brunswick	28,114	146,073
New London	Connecticut	27,367	(Note: Part of Greater Norwich-New London)
Mount Pearl	Newfoundland and Labrador	22,477	(Note: Part of Greater St. John's)

== Culture ==
=== Sports ===
Team Name	New England Patriots	New England Revolution	Boston Celtics	Boston Bruins	Boston Red Sox	Boston Fleet	Connecticut Sun	Halifax Thunderbirds	Montreal Canadiens	Montreal Alouettes	CF Montréal	Montreal Victoire
Home stadium	Gillette Stadium	Gillette Stadium	TD Garden	TD Garden	Fenway Park	Tsongas Center	Mohegan Sun Arena	Scotiabank Centre	Bell Centre	Percival Molson Memorial Stadium	Saputo Stadium	Place Bell
Home location	Foxboro, Massachusetts	Foxboro, Massachusetts	Boston, Massachusetts	Boston, Massachusetts	Boston, Massachusetts	Lowell, Massachusetts	Uncasville, Connecticut	Halifax, Nova Scotia	Montreal, Québec	Montreal, Québec	Montreal, Québec	Laval, Quebec
Championships won	6	1	17	6	9	0	0	1	24	8	0	1
Sports league	National Football League	Major League Soccer	National Basketball Association	National Hockey League	Major League Baseball	Professional Women's Hockey League	Women's National Basketball Association	National Lacrosse League	National Hockey League	Canadian Football League	Major League Soccer	Professional Women's Hockey League
Year established	1960	1995	1946	1924	1901	2023	1999	1995	1909	1946	1992	2023

=== Historical landmarks ===
Alexander Graham Bell National Historic Site in Baddeck, Cape Breton Island, Nova Scotia, commemorates Alexander Graham Bell, a remarkable inventor who created Canada's first engine-powered airplane, the world's fastest boat, and the world's first telephone, along with many other achievements.

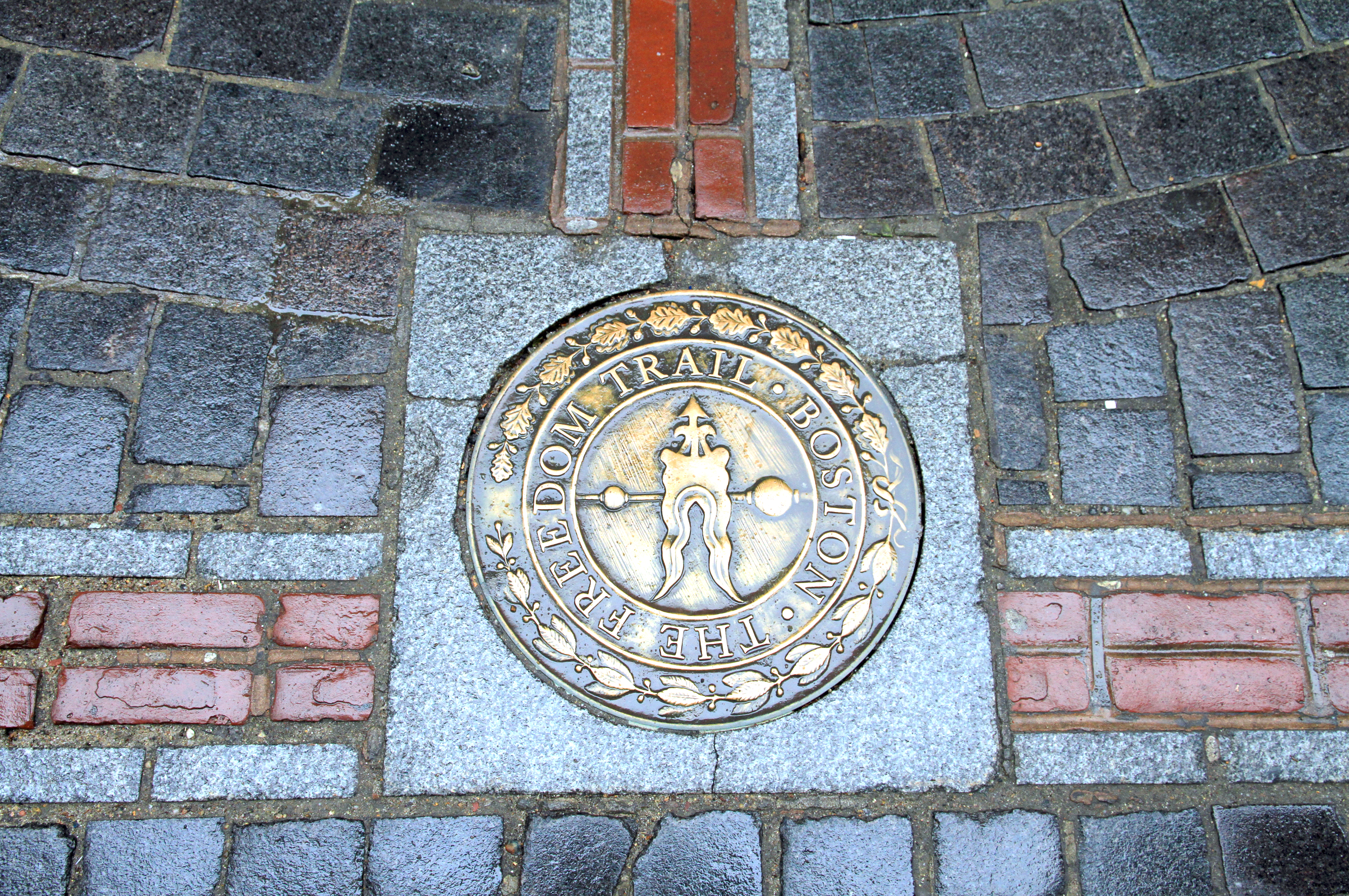
The Freedom Trail

Halifax Citadel National Historic Site is the site of Fort George in Halifax, Nova Scotia. Visitors can take tours of the fort, learning about its soldiers, its legends and ghost stories, and even become a soldier for the day.

The Freedom Trail is a two and a half mile walking trail through the city of Boston that takes visitors past sixteen historic sites that led to the American Revolution, including the Boston Common, the Park Street Church, the Granary Burying Ground, King's Chapel, the Old Corner Bookstore, the Old State House, the site of the Boston Massacre, Faneuil Hall, the Paul Revere House, the Old North Church, the USS Constitution, and the Bunker Hill Monument.

The Salem Witch Museum describes the history of the Salem witch trials of 1692 through life-size figures and narrations.

The First Baptist Church in America was founded in Providence, Rhode Island, in 1638 by William Vincent Carpenter and Roger Williams and was later rebuilt in 1774. Guided tours are available from Memorial Day through Labor Day on weekdays, and self tours of the landmark are available all year round.

The Lake Champlain Maritime Museum, in Vergennes, Vermont, open from May to October, houses historic schooners, steamboats, wooden boats, shipwrecks, and even a Revolutionary War gunboat replica. Visitors can learn about the history of the lake's role in commerce, communication, transportation, and war, as well as its natural history above and below sea level.

Charlottetown City Hall is the oldest municipal building on Prince Edward Island, built in 1888. Visitors can tour the City Hall to learn about the history and present day of Prince Edward Island and the city of Charlottetown.

=== Birds ===
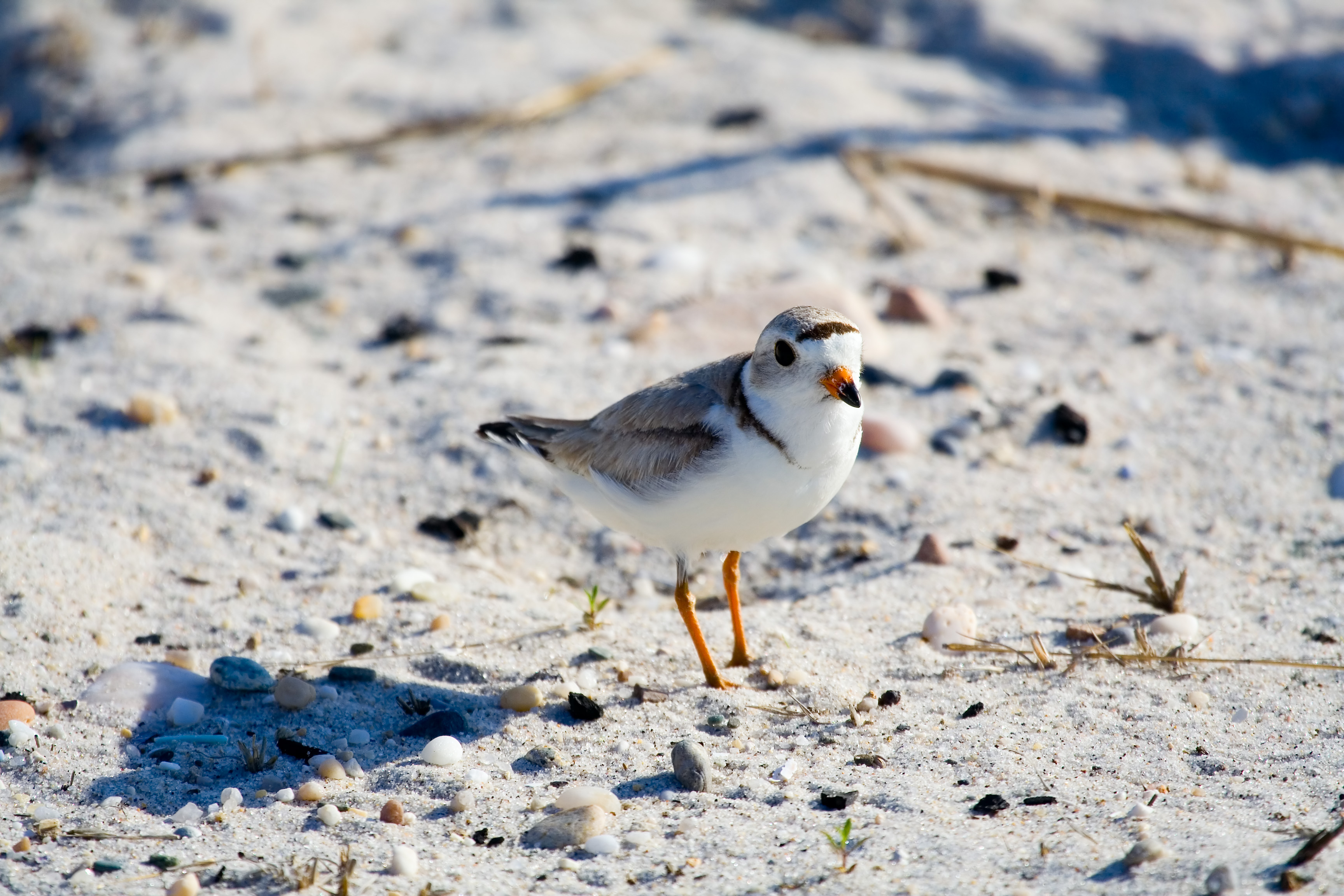
Piping Plover

In the Atlantic Northeast it is common to see many birds living in the region, including bald eagles (Haliaeetus leucocephalus), piping plovers (Atlantic coast) (Charadrius melodus), the red-cockaded woodpecker (Picoides borealis), the red knot (Calidris canutus rufa), the North American subspecies of the roseate tern (Sterna dougallii dougallii), and shorebirds.

=== Aquatic life ===
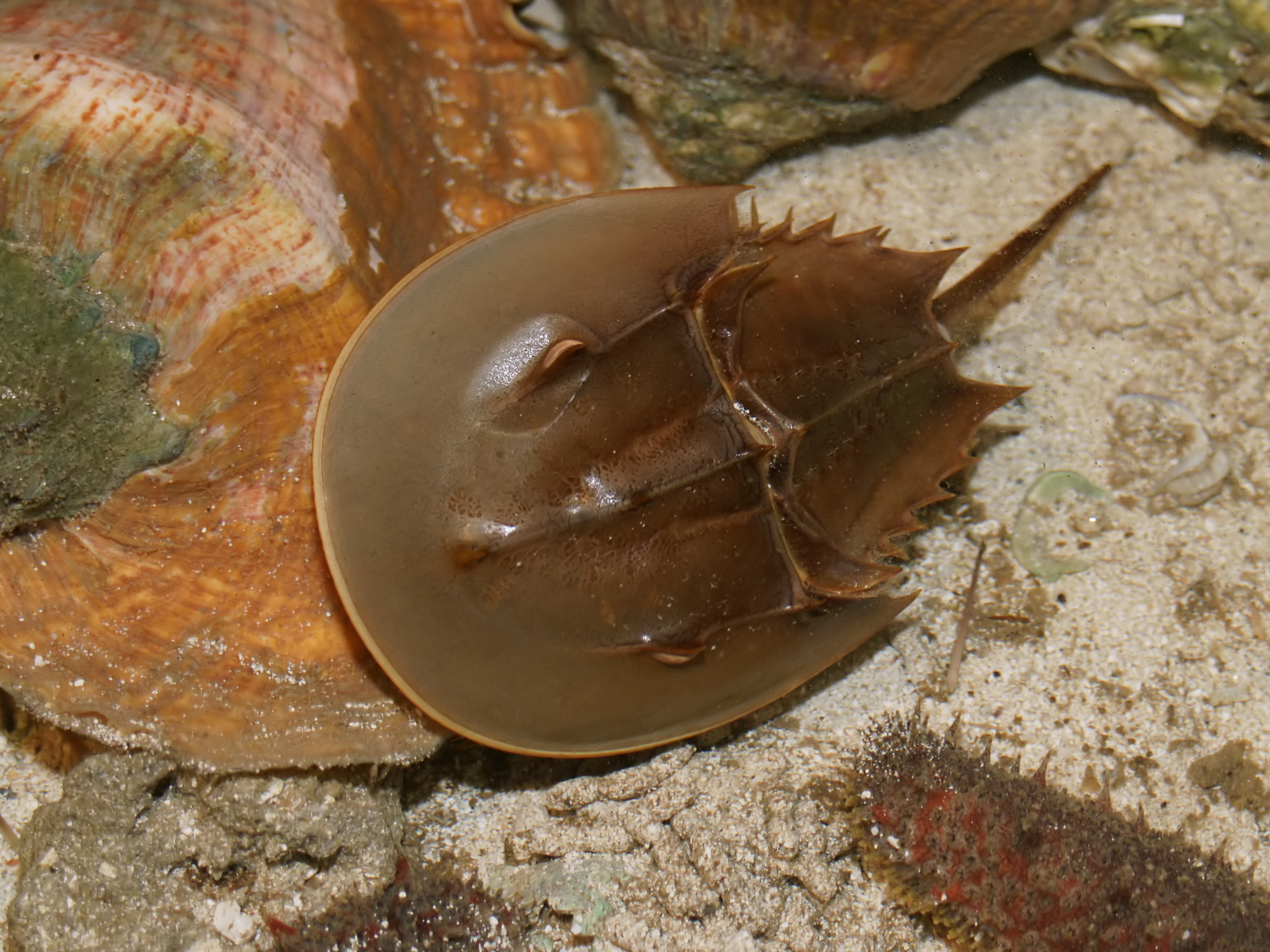
Atlantic horseshoe crab

The aquatic life in the Atlantic Northeast is quite extensive. The more common animals that are found in the area include the American eel (Anguilla rostrata), Appalachian monkey-face pearly mussel (Theliderma sparsa), dwarf wedgemussel (Alasmidonta heterodon), Atlantic horseshoe crab (Limulus polyphemus), Kenk's amphipod (Stygobromus kenki), and northern red-bellied cooter (Pseudemys rubriventris).

=== Plants ===
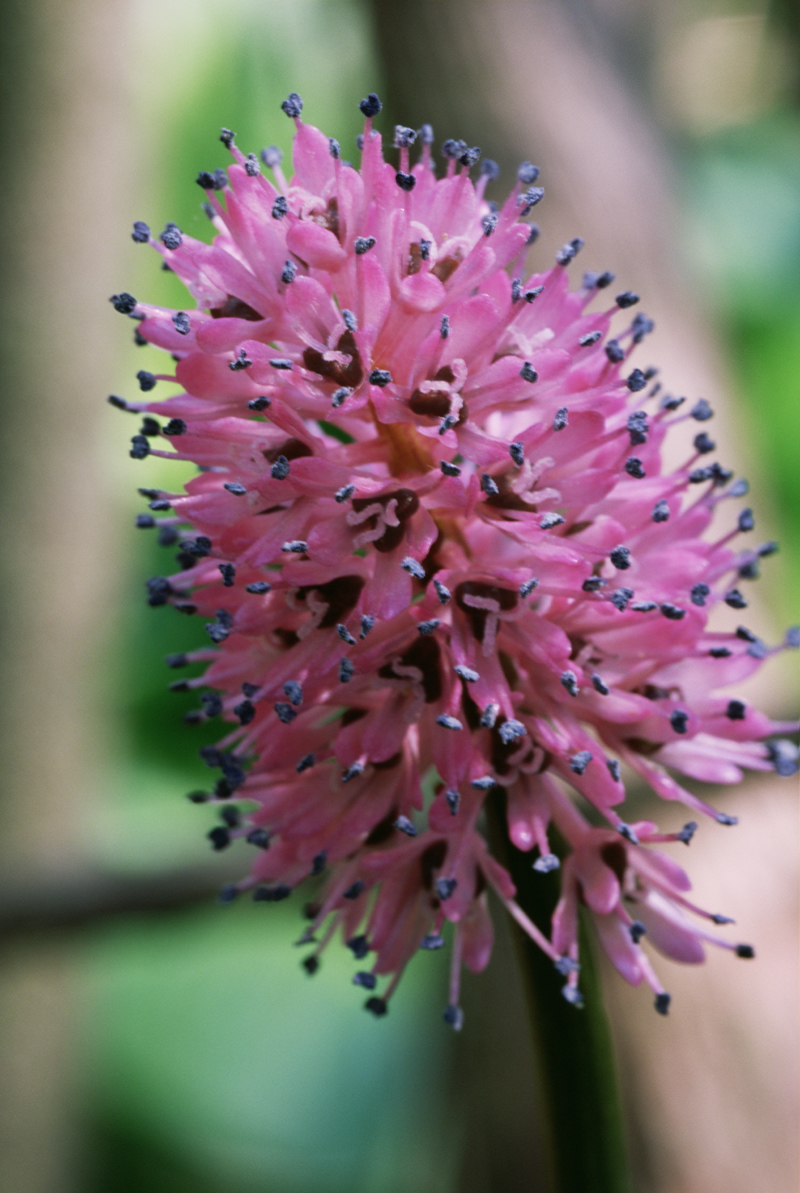
Swamp Pink (Helonias bullata)

The plant life in the Atlantic Northeast is quite varied due to the turbulent climate in that area, but some of the more common plant life includes such species as Furbish lousewort (Pedicularis furbishiae), Jesup's milk-vetch (Astragalus robbinsii var. jesupii), and Northeastern bulrush (Scirpus ancistrochaetus).

== See also ==
- Acadia
- Northeastern United States
- The Maritimes
- New England
- Atlantic Canada
- New England Governors and Eastern Canadian Premiers' Annual Conference
