= List of lighthouses in New Brunswick =

This is a list of lighthouses in New Brunswick.

== Lighthouses ==
Name	Image	Year built	Location & coordinates	Class of Light	Focal height	NGA number or ARLHS	Admiralty number or CCG	Range nml
Bathurst Range Front Light		1871 est.	Bathurst; 47°39′07″N 65°37′23″W	Q R	8 metres (26 ft)	7204	H1600	8
Bathurst Range Rear Light		1871 est.	Bathurst; 47°38′51″N 65°37′35″W	Iso R 4s.	18 metres (59 ft)	7208	H1600.1	16
Bayswater Light	Image	1914	Grand Bay–Westfield; 45°21′02″N 66°08′01″W	inactive since 2005	8 metres (26 ft) (tower)	ARLHS; CAN-025	---	---
Belledune Point Light	Image	1972	Sea Side (relocated); 47°57′31″N 66°08′31″W	inactive since 2002	8 metres (26 ft) (tower)	ARLHS; CAN-705	---	---
Belyea's Point Light	Image	1930s	Grand Bay–Westfield; 45°22′41″N 66°12′58″W	Fl G 5s.	13.6 metres (45 ft)	ARLHS; CAN-031	CCG 122	5
Big Shippegan Light	Image	1872	Lamèque Island; 47°43′20″N 64°39′38″W	Fl Y 5s.	16 metres (52 ft)	7392	H1530	15
Black Point Light	Image	1967	Black Point; 47°53′07″N 64°37′24″W	Oc (2) Y 10s.	18 metres (59 ft)	7360	H1556	12
Bliss Island Light	Image	1964	Bliss Island; 45°01′07″N 66°51′01″W	Fl R 4s.	15 metres (49 ft)	11200	H4118	5
Bouctouche Bar Light	Image	1902 est.	Bouctouche; 46°27′40″N 64°36′46″W	Fl W 4s.	11 metres (36 ft)	7680	H1362	7
Campbellton Range Rear Light	Image	1985	Campbellton; 48°00′36″N 66°40′19″W	inactive (F Y)	17 metres (56 ft)	ex-7132	ex-H 1632.1	---
Cape Enrage Light		1838	Cape Enrage; 45°35′38″N 64°46′48″W	Fl G 6s.	41 metres (135 ft)	11064	H4060	10
Cape Jourimain Light		1870	Bayfield; 46°09′27″N 63°48′24″W	inactive since 1997	16 metres (52 ft) (tower)	ARLHS; CAN-706	ex- H1318	---
Cape Spencer Light	Image	1983	Saint John; 45°11′43″N 65°54′35″W	Fl W 11s.	62 metres (203 ft)	11088	H4078	14
Cape Tormentine Outer Wharf Light		1940s	Cape Tormentine; 46°08′06″N 63°46′20″W	Iso R 2s.	12 metres (39 ft)	7824	H1308	5
Caraquet Island Light		1950s	Caraquet Island; 47°49′22″N 64°54′16″W	Fl W 4s.	22 metres (72 ft)	7272	H1588	9
Caraquet Range Front Light	Image	1903	Caraquet; 47°48′30″N 64°50′28″W	F Y	8 metres (26 ft)	7276	H1580	13
Caraquet Range Rear Light	Image	1903	Bas-Caraquet (relocated); 47°48′16″N 64°49′29″W	inactive since 2000	12.5 metres (41 ft) (tower)	ARLHS; CAN-707	ex-H1580.1	---
Cassie Point Light	Image	1872	Grande-Digue; 46°19′11″N 64°30′45″W	L Fl (2) Y 12s.	14 metres (46 ft)	7724	H1350	11
Chance Harbour Light	Image	1969	Chance Harbour; 45°07′07″N 66°20′51″W	L Fl W 12s.	12 metres (39 ft)	11152	H4100	7
Chiasson Office		-	Chiasson Office	Fl Y 5s.	54 ft	_	_	_
Cocagne Range Front Light	Image	1907	Cocagne; 46°20′07″N 64°36′54″W	F Y	8 metres (26 ft)	7708	H1354	13
Courtenay Bay Breakwater Light	Image	1927	Saint John; 45°15′26″N 66°02′42″W	Fl R 4s.	13 metres (43 ft)	11112	H4083	5
Dalhousie Island Light		1886 est.	Dalhousie; 48°04′20″N 66°21′51″W	Fl W 5s,	21 metres (69 ft)	7152	H1620	15
Dalhousie Wharf Light	Image	1909	Charlo (relocated); 48°00′13″N 66°20′21″W	inactive since 1960	6 metres (20 ft) (tower)	ARLHS; CAN-724	---	---
Dixon Point Range Front Light		1919	Saint-Louis-de-Kent; 46°27′24″N 64°39′03″W	FL W 5s.	10 metres (33 ft)	7686	H1382	12
Dixon Point Range Rear Light		1919	Saint-Louis-de-Kent; 46°27′24″N 64°39′03″W	inactive	9 metres (30 ft) (tower)	7686	H1369.1	---
Fort Monckton Light		1971	Strait Shores; 46°02′36″N 64°04′15″W	Fl W 3s. (seasonal)	7 metres (23 ft) (tower)	7844	H-1304	7
Gagetown Light	Image	1934	Arcadia; 45°46′07″N 66°08′25″W	F G	11.9 metres (39 ft)	ARLHS; CAN-190	CCG 135	8
Gannet Rock Lighthouse		1831	Bay of Fundy; 44°30′37″N 66°46′54″W	Fl W 5s.	28 metres (92 ft)	11416	H4188	19
Grand Dune Flats Range Front Light	Image	1916	Burnt Church; 47°11′41″N 65°08′07″W	inactive since 1950s	12 metres (39 ft) (tower)	ARLHS; CAN-726	---	---
Grand Dune Flats Range Rear Light		1916 est.	Alniwick Parish; 47°08′34″N 65°14′35″W	F W	26 metres (85 ft)	7504	H1472.1	11
Grand Dune Outer Range Rear Light		n/a	Black River-Hardwicke; 47°06′24″N 64°59′53″W	Iso W 4s.	32 metres (105 ft)	7499	H1452.1	17
Grand Harbour Lighthouse		1879	Grand Manan Island; 44°40′02″N 66°44′59″W	inactive since 1963	12 metres (39 ft)	ARLHS; CAN-709	---	---
Grande-Digue Light	Image	1912	Grande-Digue; 46°17′41″N 64°33′38″W	inactive since 1950s	6 metres (20 ft) (tower)	---	---	---
Grant Beach Range Front Light	Image	1903	Lower Newcastle-Russellville (relocated); 47°04′56″N 65°23′08″W	inactive since 1972	12 metres (39 ft) (tower)	ARLHS; CAN-727	---	---
Grant Beach Range Rear Light		n/a	Lower Newcastle-Russellville; 47°05′07″N 65°23′11″W	Iso R 4s.	41 metres (135 ft)	7536	H1491.1	16
Grant Beach Range Rear Light	Image	1903	The Willows; 47°06′43″N 65°17′31″W	inactive since 1972	12 metres (39 ft) (tower)	ARLHS; CAN-728	---	---
Great Duck Island Light	Image	1966	Grand Manan Island; 44°41′04″N 66°41′36″W	Fl W 10s. emergency light	15 metres (49 ft)	11384	H4174	18
Green's Point Lighthouse	Image	1903	L'Etete; 45°02′20″N 66°53′31″W	inactive since 1999	12 metres (39 ft) (tower)	11208	H4120	---
Grindstone Island Light	Image	1911	Harvey, Albert County; 45°43′19″N 64°37′15″W	inactive since 2001	20.5 metres (67 ft) tower	ARLHS; CAN-711	ex-H4046	---
Hampstead Wharf Light	Image	1900	Hampstead; 45°37′30″N 66°05′05″W	inactive since 1994	5.5 metres (18 ft) (tower)	ARLHS; CAN-221	---	----
Head Harbour Lighthouse	Image	1829	Bay of Fundy; 44°57′28″N 66°54′00″W	F R	18 metres (59 ft)	11332	H4154	13
Hendry Farm Light	Image	1893	Arcadia; 45°43′59″N 66°02′54″W	inactive since 1995	8 metres (26 ft) (tower)	ARLHS; CAN-520	---	---
Inch Arran Point Range Front Light		1870	Dalhousie; 48°03′40″N 66°21′03″W	Iso W 6s.	14 metres (46 ft)	7164	H1616	11
Leonardville Light	Image	1914	Deer Island; 44°58′06″N 66°57′18″W	F W	20 metres (66 ft)	11264	H4146	10
Lighthouse Point Lighthouse	Image	1984	Beaver Harbour; 45°03′47″N 66°43′59″W	Iso W 6s.	14 metres (46 ft)	11184	H4112	12
Long Eddy Point Light	Image	1966	Grand Manan Island; 44°47′59″N 66°47′08″W	Fl R 8s.	38 metres (125 ft)	11360	H4166	14
Long Point Light		1966	White Head Island; 44°36′50″N 66°42′35″W	Iso W 12s.	28 metres (92 ft)	11416	H4188	12
Lower Jemseg Light		1884 est.	Lower Jemseg; 45°46′47″N 66°06′24″W	F R 4s.	9 metres (30 ft)	ARLHS; CAN-917	CCG 136	---
Lower Musquash Island Light	Image	1893	Wickham; 45°42′29″N 66°03′58″W	inactive since 1994	12 metres (39 ft) (tower)	ARLHS; CAN-333	---	---
Lower Neguac Wharf Range Rear Light	Image	1892	Neguac; 47°15′41″N 65°03′13″W	inactive since 2003	8 metres (26 ft) (tower)	ARLHS; CAN-289	ex-H1518.1	---
Machias Seal Island Light	Image	1915	Machias Seal Island; 44°30′07″N 67°06′07″W	Fl W 3s.	25 metres (82 ft)	11444	H4192	17
Maisonnette Point Light		1915	Maisonnette; 47°50′15″N 65°00′13″W	Fl W 2.4s.	18 metres (59 ft)	7264	H1590	15
McColgan Point Light	Image	1914	Grand Bay–Westfield; 45°19′56″N 66°06′34″W	Fl W 10s.	11.3 metres (37 ft)	ARLHS; CAN-309	CCG 119	6
Miscou Island Lighthouse		1930s	Miscou Island; 48°00′34″N 64°29′35″W	Fl G 5s.	14 metres (46 ft)	7368	H1552	12
Mulholland Point Light		1885	Welshpol; 44°51′47″N 66°58′47″W	inactive since 1963	13.5 metres (44 ft)	ARLHS; CAN-326	---	---
Musquash Head Light	Image	1959	Musquash; 45°08′37″N 66°14′14″W	Fl W 3s.	35 metres (115 ft)	11148	H4096	20
Oak Point Light	Image	1902	Oak Point; 45°30′27″N 66°04′48″W	Fl G 10s.	15.7 metres (52 ft)	ARLHS; CAN-358	CCG 125	8
Oak Point Range Front Light		1904	Miramichi (relocated); 47°03′03″N 65°28′06″W	inactive since 1960s	10 metres (33 ft) (tower)	ARLHS; CAN-732	---	---
Partridge Island Light	Image	1961	Saint John; 45°14′21″N 66°03′14″W	FL W 7.5s.	35 metres (115 ft)	11100	H4082	19
Pea Point Light	Image	1965	Blacks Harbour; 45°02′21″N 66°48′28″W	F W	17 metres (56 ft)	11192	H4114	
Petit Rocher Light		1879 est.	Petit-Rocher; 47°46′55″N 65°42′27″W	Fl Y 10s.	8 metres (26 ft)	7196	H1606	15
Point Escuminac Light		1966	Point Escuminac; 47°04′23″N 64°47′53″W	Fl W 3s.	22 metres (72 ft)	7580	H1424	13
Point Lepreau Light	Image	1959	Point Lepreau; 45°03′32″N 66°27′31″W	Fl W 5s.	26 metres (85 ft)	11160	H4108	14
Pointe à Brideau Range Front Light		n/a	Caraquet; 47°47′47″N 64°56′13″W	F W	8 metres (26 ft)	7305	H1585	19
Pointe à Brideau Range Rear Light	Image	1978	Caraquet; 47°47′42″N 64°56′30″W	F W	14 metres (46 ft)	7306	H1586.1	19
Pointe du Chêne Range Front Light	Image	1898	Shediac; 46°14′27″N 64°30′42″W	F R	8 metres (26 ft)	7736	H1328	11
Pointe du Chêne Range Rear Light	Image	1898	Shediac; 46°14′22″N 64°30′43″W	F R	14 metres (46 ft)	7740	H1328.1	11
Pointe à Jérôme Range Front Light	Image	1916	Bouctouche; 46°29′12″N 64°40′46″W	F W (seasonal)	6 metres (20 ft)	7692	H1368	13
Pointe à Jérôme Range Rear Light	Image	1916	Bouctouche; 46°29′21″N 64°40′58″W	F W (seasonal)	18 metres (59 ft)	7696	H1368.1	13
Pointe Sapin Range Rear Light	Image	1910	Pointe-Sapin; 46°57′50″N 64°49′50″W	inactive since 2016	7.5 metres (25 ft) (tower)	ex-7596	ex-H1418.1	---
Pokesudie Island Light		1881 est.	Pokesudie Island; 47°49′10″N 64°45′16″W	Iso W 4s.	13 metres (43 ft)	7308	H1566	10
Portage Channel Range Rear Light		1986	Black River-Hardwicke; 47°07′43″N 65°02′31″W	F W	19 metres (62 ft)	7484	H1446.1	18
Portage Island Range Rear Light		1908	Shippagan (relocated); 47°44′53″N 64°42′33″W	inactive since 1986	13 metres (43 ft) (tower)	ARLHS; CAN-733	ex-H1444.1	---
Quaco Head Light	Image	1976	Fundy-St. Martins; 45°19′26″N 65°32′07″W	L Fl R 6s.	26 metres (85 ft)	11080	H4076	21
Richibucto Head Light		1865 est.	Richibucto; 46°40′11″N 64°42′42″W	Fl W 5s.	18 metres (59 ft)	7660	H1376	14
Richibucto Town Range Rear Light		n/a	Richibucto; 46°40′42″N 64°51′55″W	F Y	23 metres (75 ft)	7652	H1402.1	11
Saint John Harbour Range Front Light	Image	n/a	Saint John; 45°16′22″N 66°04′07″W	F G	21 metres (69 ft)	11104	H4089	20
Sand Point Light	Image	1898	Grand Bay–Westfield; 45°20′33″N 66°11′56″W	F R	22.7 metres (74 ft)	ARLHS; CAN-445	CCG 121	7
Shediac Harbour Range Rear Light		1914 est.	Shediac; 46°14′26″N 64°31′50″W	Iso Y 4s.	12 metres (39 ft)	7748	H1332.1	22
Southwest Head Light	Image	1959	Grand Manan Island; 44°36′04″N 66°54′20″W	Fl W 10s.	48 metres (157 ft)	11436	H4186	16
Southwest Wolf Island Light	Image	1982	Pennfield Parish; 44°56′12″N 66°44′00″W	Fl W 10s.	38 metres (125 ft)	11172	H4110	7
St. Andrews North Point Light, also called Pendlebury Lighthouse		1833 (first)	St. Andrews; 45°04′03″N 67°02′50″W	Fl R 4s.	7 metres (23 ft) (tower)	11230	H4127	4
Stonehaven Light		1885 est.	Stonehaven; 47°45′12″N 65°21′42″W	Fl W 4s.	21.5 metres (71 ft)	7240	H1596	10
Swallowtail Lighthouse		1860	Grand Manan Island; 44°45′52″N 66°43′57″W	Oc W 6s.	37 metres (121 ft)	11364	H4168	12
Swift Point Lighthouse		1869	Saint John; 45°16′57″N 66°07′17″W	Fl G 12s.	28 metres (92 ft)	---	---	---
The Cedars Light	Image	1904	Kingston Peninsula; 45°28′42″N 66°04′57″W	inactive since 1994	10 metres (33 ft) (tower)	ARLHS; CAN-124	---	---
Tongue Shoal Light		1875 est.	Passamaquoddy Bay; 45°03′45″N 67°00′46″W	Fl W 4s.	7 metres (23 ft)	11232	H4126	7
Wimot Bluff Light	Image	1869	Oromocto; 45°52′09″N 66°30′38″W	inactive since 1969	13 metres (43 ft) (tower)	ARLHS; CAN-734	---	---

== See also ==
- List of lighthouses in Canada
