= Belyea =

Belyea (also spelled Bulyea or Boulier) is a French Huguenot surname. It is mostly found in Canada, among descendants of United Empire Loyalists, who moved north as refugees during and after the American War of Independence. The name may refer to:

== People ==
- George H. V. Bulyea (1859–1928), Canadian politician
- Helen Belyea (1913–1986), Canadian geologist
- Herbert Belyea (1917–2001), Canadian musician
- Jodie Belyea, Australian politician

== Places ==
- Belyea's Point Light, New Brunswick, Canada
- Bulyea, Saskatchewan, Canada
- Bulyea Heights, Edmonton, Canada
- Mount Bulyea, Canada
