= Sapin =

Sapin means "fir tree" in French. It may refer to:

- Michel Sapin (born 1952), French politician
- Sapin-sapin, a dessert in Philippine cuisine
- Sapins FC, a Gabonese football club
- The Kingdom of Sapin, a fictional country from the game Ace Combat Zero: The Belkan War
- Pointe-Sapin, New Brunswick
- Sapin II bill, France 2016, banning advertising of risky financial products such as binary options
