= Belyea's Point Light =

Lighthouse in Canada

Belyea's Point Lighthouse
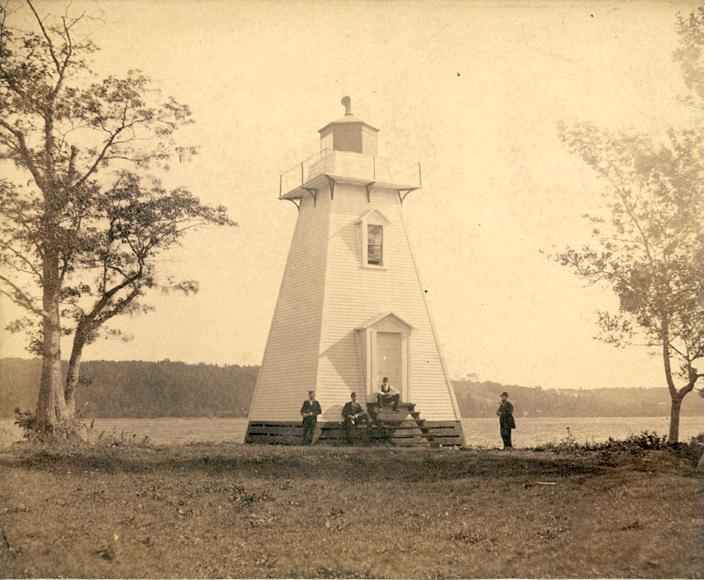
- An early photograph of Belyea's Point Lighthouse
- Location: North of Westfield, near Morrisdale; Kings County; New Brunswick; Canada
- Coordinates: 45°22′41.4″N 66°12′57.8″W

Tower
- Constructed: 1882 (first)
- Construction: wooden tower
- Height: 11.3 metres (37 ft)
- Shape: square tower with balcony and lantern
- Markings: white tower and gallery, red lantern and trim
- Operator: Canadian Coast Guard

Light
- First lit: 1930s (current)
- Focal height: 14 metres (46 ft)
- Characteristic: Fl G 5s.

Belyea's Point Lighthouse is an 11-metre (36 ft)-tall landfall lighthouse located along the Saint John River, near the community of Morrisdale. It was built in 1881, commenced operation on June 1, 1882, with Spafford Barker Belyea serving as its first keeper and later rebuilt at a slightly different location after having been damaged due to severe flooding in the 1930s. The Canadian Coast Guard owns the lighthouse, the land it is on, and maintains it.

The light's characteristic is a single green flash that occurs every five seconds, emitted at a focal plane height of 14 metres (46 ft).

The lighthouse is named for its original keeper, "Spafford Barker Belyea" and the area's original United Empire Loyalist settler, "Hendrick Belyea".

Because the region is susceptible to spring flooding, the lighthouse frequently gives the impression of being afloat in the river until the water subsides.

== See also ==
- List of lighthouses in New Brunswick
- List of lighthouses in Canada
