= Cape Spencer Light (New Brunswick) =

Lighthouse in New Brunswick, Canada

Cape Spencer Lighthouse
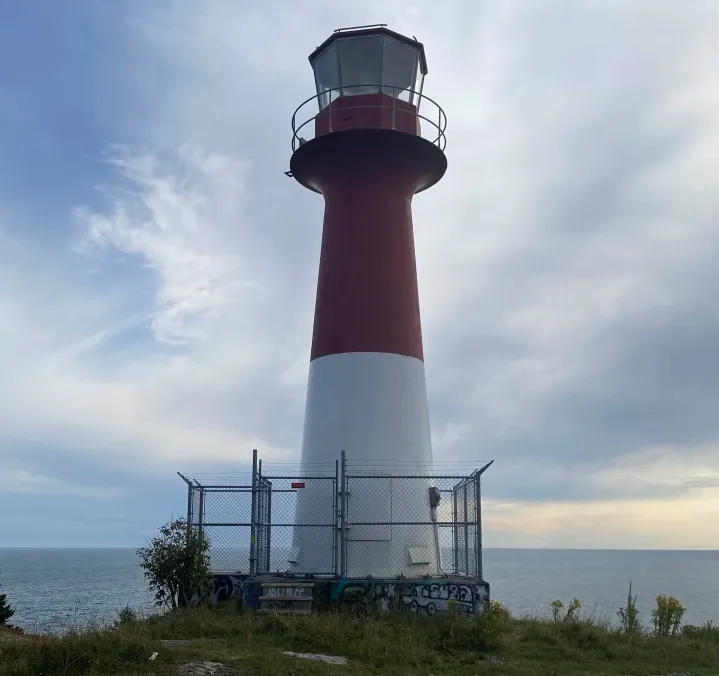
- Cape Spencer Light in September 2024
- Location: Mispec, Saint John County, New Brunswick
- Coordinates: 45.1953°N 65.9099°W

Tower
- Constructed: 1873 (first); 1918 (second); 1971 (third)
- Foundation: concrete base
- Construction: fiberglass tower (current) wooden tower (first) concrete tower (second) steel skeletal tower (third)
- Height: 12 metres (39 ft)
- Shape: conical tower with balcony and lantern (current) square tower (first) octagonal tower (second) square tower (third)
- Markings: white lower half tower, red upper half tower and lantern (current)
- Operator: Canadian Coast Guard
- Fog signal: three 2s. blasts every 60s.

Light
- First lit: 1983 (current)
- Focal height: 62 metres (203 ft)
- Range: 14 nautical miles (26 km; 16 mi)
- Characteristic: Fl W 11s.

The Cape Spencer Light is an active lighthouse along the Bay of Fundy in Mispec, located southeast of Saint John, New Brunswick. There have been several towers at this site: the first was a wooden house built in 1873, which was succeeded by a concrete tower in 1918. The present fiberglass tower was erected in 1983 to replace a skeletal tower first lit in 1971.

== See also ==
- List of lighthouses in New Brunswick
- List of lighthouses in Canada
