= Lighthouse Point Lighthouse =

Lighthouse in New Brunswick, Canada

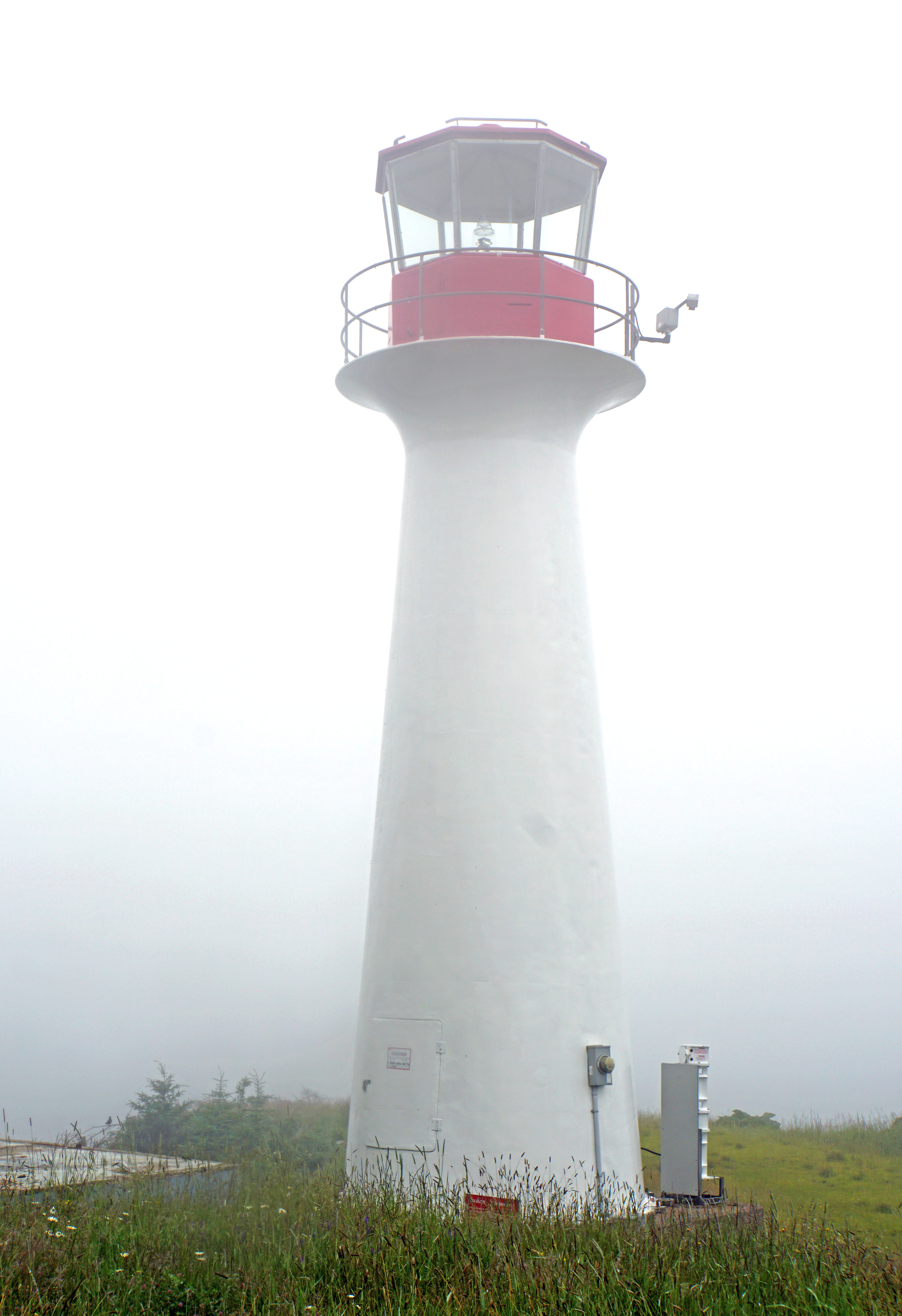
- Location: New Brunswick, Canada
- Coordinates: 45°03′47″N 66°43′59″W

Tower
- Construction: concrete (foundation), fiberglass (tower)
- Height: 8 m (26 ft)
- Shape: tapered cylindrical tower with balcony and lantern
- Markings: White (tower), red (lantern)
- Operator: Canadian Coast Guard
- Fog signal: 6s. blast every 60s.

Light
- First lit: 1984
- Focal height: 14.5 m (48 ft)
- Range: 12 nmi (22 km; 14 mi)
- Characteristic: Iso W 6s
- 1960s tower
- Constructed: 1960s
- Construction: metal
- Shape: square pyramidal skeletal tower with balcony and light
- Original tower
- Constructed: 1875
- Construction: structural wood (tower)
- Shape: quadrangular tower with balcony and lantern
- Markings: White (tower), red (lantern)
- First lit: 15 January 1876
- Focal height: 45 ft (14 m)
- Lens: seventh order Fresnel lens (1905–), fourth order Fresnel lens (1915–)
- Range: 10 nmi (19 km; 12 mi)
- Characteristic: F W

The Lighthouse Point Lighthouse is an active lighthouse in Beaver Harbour, New Brunswick on Drews Head, as it was known, on the western side of the bay.

== History ==
The first lighthouse was inaugurated on 15 January 1876 and consisted of a white wooden quadrangular tower with balcony and red lantern attached to the keeper's house; the light was at 45 feet (14 m) of height above sea level and emitted a fixed white light. In 1900 was activated a hand foghorn and in 1905 a seventh-order lens and lamp substituted the original lamp and reflectors; the new fixed white light was visible up to 10 nautical miles (19 km; 12 mi). In 1915 a fourth-order lens was set up and in the 1960s a new metal square pyramidal skeletal tower was built to substitute the older.

The current lighthouse was erected in 1984 and consist of a 8 metres (26 ft) fiberglass cylindrical tower with balcony and lantern. The light is positioned at 14.5 metres (48 ft) above sea level and emits one white flash 3 seconds long in a 6 seconds period visible up to a distance of 12 nautical miles (22 km; 14 mi). The lighthouse is completely automated and managed by the Canadian Coast Guard with the identification code number CCG 83.

== Keepers ==
- Ezra Munro (1875 – 1882)
- Edward Dukes Snell (1882 – 1892)
- John C. Conley (1892 – 1904)
- John "Melvin" Eldridge (1904 – 1926)
- Roy A. Sparks (1928 – at least 1939)
- Hazen Holmes (1952 – 1957)
- Garnett William Eldridge (1957 – 1967)
- Edward N. Wilson (1967 – 1970)
- C.A. Stuart (1970 – 1983)
- R.C. Stuart (1983 – 1984)

== See also ==
- List of lighthouses in New Brunswick
- List of lighthouses in Canada
