= Machias Seal Island =

Disputed island on the US-Canada border

Disputed island
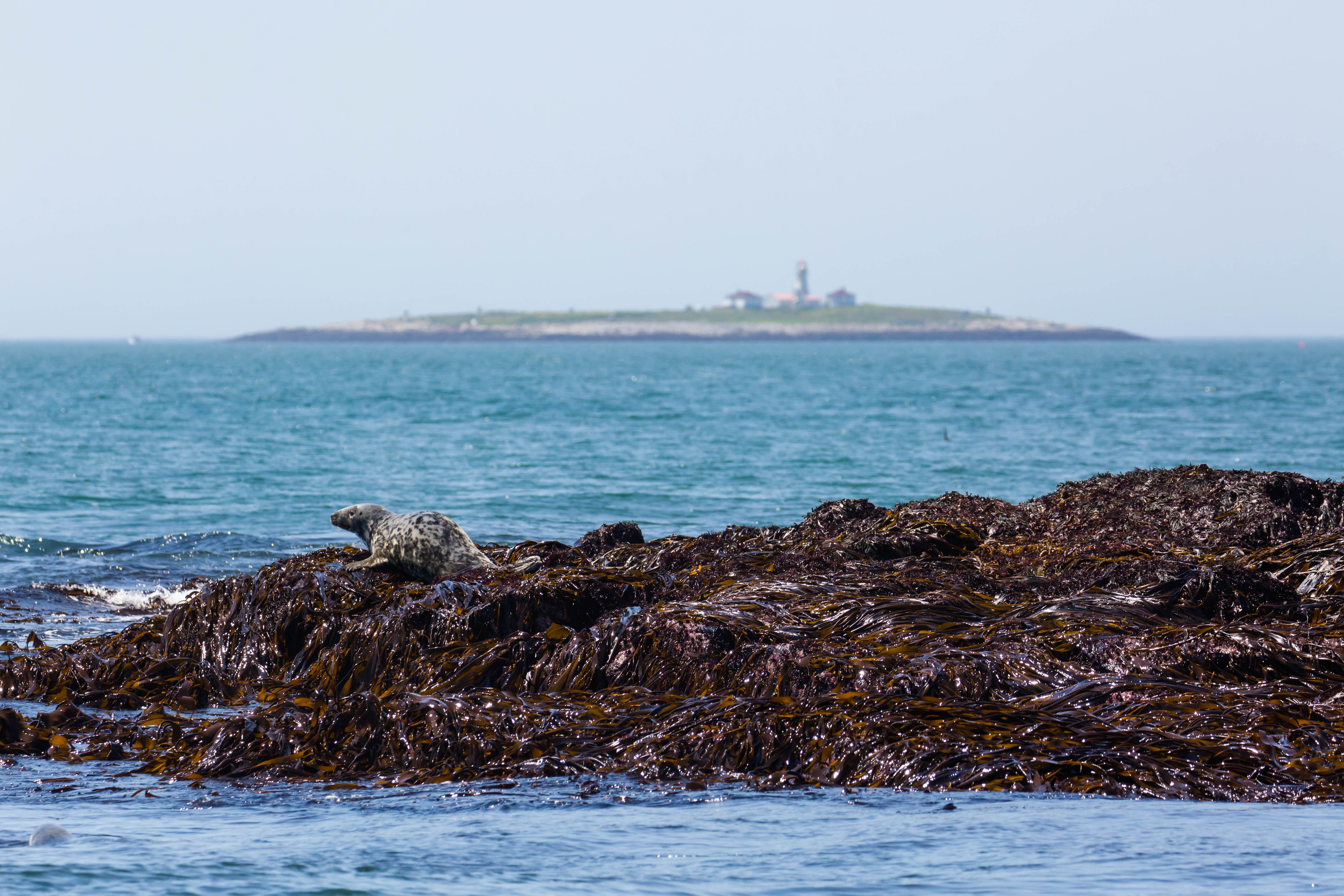
- Machias Seal Island on the horizon
- Interactive map of Machias Seal Island

Geography
- Location: Far Southern region of the Bay of Fundy
- Coordinates: 44°30′0″N 67°6′4″W
- Archipelago: Grand Manan Archipelago (disputed) / Machias Seal Island & North Rock Archipelago (disputed)
- Area: 8 ha (20 acres)

Administration
- Canada
- Province: New Brunswick

Claimed by
- Canada
- Province: New Brunswick
- United States
- State: Maine

Demographics
- Population: none (Canadian Coast Guard lighthouse keepers occupy the lighthouse on a rotational basis; temporary population increases in the summer with University of New Brunswick researchers and a Canadian Wildlife Service observer) (1995)

Additional information
- Machias Seal Island Lighthouse
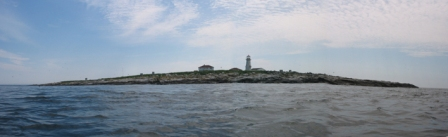
- The island with the lighthouse in the centre
- Constructed: 1832 (twin tower first); 1878 (second)
- Foundation: concrete base (current)
- Construction: wooden tower (first) concrete tower (current)
- Height: 19.8 m (65 ft), 25 m (82 ft)
- Shape: tapered octagonal prism tower with balcony and lantern
- Markings: white tower, red lantern roof
- Power source: solar power
- Operator: Canadian Coast Guard
- Heritage: recognized federal heritage building of Canada, heritage lighthouse
- Fog signal: two 3s. blasts every 60s.
- First lit: 1915 (current)
- Focal height: 18 m (59 ft)
- Range: 17 nmi (31 km; 20 mi)
- Characteristic: Fl W 3s

Machias Seal Island is an island in disputed water between the Gulf of Maine and the Bay of Fundy, about 8.6 nmi (16 km) southeast from Cutler, Maine, and 10 nmi (19 km) southwest of Grand Manan Island, New Brunswick. Canada has had a permanent settlement on the island since 1832, when the lighthouse was first constructed. However, the United States also claims sovereignty of the island, despite never having physical presence on it. The Canadian Coast Guard continues to staff the lighthouse on the island.

== Geography ==
The relationship of Machias Seal Island to the Grand Manan archipelago is unclear, but it may be a continuation of the exposed shoals, rocks, and islets strewn southwest of the Grand Manan Islands. The deeper Grand Manan Channel is situated to the north and west of the island, separating it from the coast of Washington County, Maine.

The climate and weather of Machias Seal Island is typical for the region. It is fog-bound for many days of the year, similar to the weather found at the nearby coasts of Maine and Grand Manan. The weather often causes rough waters, making any approach to the island hazardous.

Machias Seal Island is named because it is an exposed and barren island, devoid of any trees, and is attractive for seals using it as a prominence. Its geography and remote location also makes it valuable as a sanctuary for seabirds such as Atlantic puffins, razorbills, common murres, common terns, and Arctic terns, Leach's storm petrels, and common eiders.

It is a neighbour to North Rock, 2.0 nmi (4 km) away.

== History ==
Native Wabanaki tribes fished the surrounding water and traveled to all the lands of Maine using seaworthy birchbark canoes prior to the arrival of Western powers.

Britain established possession of Machias Seal Island and, under pressure from shipping interests at Saint John, constructed a lighthouse in 1832 at the cost of £746. The initial contract had hoped to erect two lights, on the ENE and NNW sides of the island.

The brig Charlotte was laden with cargo and last seen on April 30, 1829 just above Western Ledge. The following morning, the schooner Liberty found its longboat and floating wreckage six kilometres north of Machias Seal Island, while Dyer Wilcos found a dog from the ship and wreckage at Hay Point on the southern tip of Grand Manan. No other hint as to the Charlotte's final resting place was ever determined.

As of 1842, Thomas Wyer was one of three commissioners of the lighthouses on Machias Seal Island, Campobello and at Saint Andrews. British-Canadian Lighthouse keepers James Connolly and his sons were the sole residents of the island for 37 years, before retiring to Saint Andrews.

From 1855 to 1875, John C. Conley was lightkeeper of Machias Seal Island, inheriting the position after assisting his father for ten years. In 1875 the fog whistle was replaced with a steam engine model, which required an engineer to operate so Conley was removed - although two years later he was appointed keeper of the Sand Reef, and later Drews Head, light stations.

On January 9, 1869, a Sackville brigantine loaded with lumber and hay struck Gull Rock, an islet a quarter-mile from Machias Seal Island. The 9-man crew was saved by the Connollys and billeted at the lighthouse for four days before being taken back to the mainland. Six similar shipwrecks occurred during their tenure.

On April 22, 1896, the wife of Charles F. Seeley gave birth to a daughter on the island and another on January 5 1899.

In 1916, the lighthouse was completely rebuilt from concrete, with a new lighting apparatus and fog alarm, at a cost of $33,000.

== Dispute ==
In August 1971, the U.S. State Department officially protested Canada’s recent extension of high seas jurisdiction around Machias Seal Island. This was the first time the United States had raised any objection to British or Canadian presence on the island, nearly 140 years after the British government built a lighthouse there.

The U.S. claim to the island is based on the terms of the Treaty of Paris (1783), in which Great Britain ceded to the United States all islands within 20 leagues of U.S. shores, except those islands within the limits of Nova Scotia. The Canadian claim is based on its continuous occupation of the island, on the island being a natural extension of the undisputed Grand Manan Island, and nuances in the Treaty of Paris and subsequent treaties which may strengthen the Canadian claim.

=== Treaty of Paris (1783) ===
The Treaty of Paris ended the conflict surrounding the American Revolutionary War. Article 2 of that treaty set the boundaries:

And that all disputes which might arise in future on the subject of the boundaries of the said United States may be prevented, it is hereby agreed and declared, that the following are and shall be their boundaries, from the northwest angle of Nova Scotia, that angle which is formed by a line drawn due north from the source of St. Croix River to the highlands ... by a line to be drawn along the middle of the river Saint Croix, from its mouth in the Bay of Fundy to its source, and from its source directly north to the aforesaid highlands which divide the rivers that fall into the Atlantic Ocean from those which fall into the river Saint Lawrence; comprehending all islands within twenty leagues of any part of the shores of the United States, and lying between lines to be drawn due east from the points where the aforesaid boundaries between Nova Scotia on the one part and East Florida on the other shall, respectively, touch the Bay of Fundy and the Atlantic Ocean, excepting such islands as now are or heretofore have been within the limits of the said province of Nova Scotia.

The United States claims the island on the basis of its proximity to the American coast. Canada claims the island on the basis that territories already considered part of Nova Scotia ought to be continued as part of New Brunswick today. The "northwest angle" of Nova Scotia refers to what is today New Brunswick, and the Canada–U.S. border still follows today the St. Croix River and a line due north from its source. At the time of the treaty's writing, Grand Manan was considered to be farther North-Northeast from New England than it actually is. A line from the mouth of the St. Croix River to Brier Island and other parts of Nova Scotia across the Bay of Fundy would cross Grand Manan Island rather than contain the whole and its nearby islands. Once the St. Croix River was unambiguously identified following a commission provided by Jay's Treaty of 1794, it became clear that Machias Seal Island, as well as Grand Manan Island, was within 20 leagues (60 nmi (110 km)) of the shores of the United States and south of the line drawn due east from the mouth of the St. Croix River, but it remained unclear whether the islands were within the defined limits of Nova Scotia and its 1621 founding. That charter specifies Islands within six leagues of the boundary are part of Nova Scotia. These limits are written in the original text of the land grant dated 1621 to Sir William Alexander (founder of Nova Scotia) in which all "... islands, or seas lying near to, or within six leagues of any part ... of the said coasts" are deemed part of Nova Scotia. Machias Seal Island as well as numerous islands in Maine are located within six leagues from the original boundary line, although Britain would later cease its claims on other islands in eastern Maine, notably, Moose Island.

The ambiguities resulted in both countries claiming several islands in Passamaquoddy Bay, including Grand Manan.

=== Treaty of Ghent (1783) ===
During the War of 1812, the United Kingdom occupied coastal Maine extending from the border with New Brunswick (created from Nova Scotia in 1784) west to the Penobscot River valley. During this time, tolls were charged upon residents at various occupied harbors in the area.

The UK withdrew their forces upon signing the Treaty of Ghent in 1814, with the stipulation in Article Four that the boundary should be better delineated in the area of the Bay of Fundy. The Article Four set up a joint commission at St Andrews, New Brunswick, to reach a compromise. And if no compromise could be found, a third country would be involved to arbitrate a final decision.

Whereas it was stipulated by the second Article in the Treaty of Peace of one thousand seven hundred and eighty three between His Britannic Majesty and the United States of America that the boundary of the United States should comprehend "all Islands within twenty leagues of any part of the shores of the United States and lying between lines to be drawn due East from the points where the aforesaid boundaries between Nova Scotia on the one part and East Florida on the other shall respectively touch the Bay of Fundy and the Atlantic Ocean, excepting such Islands as now are or heretofore have been within the limits of Nova Scotia, and whereas the several Islands in the Bay of Passamaquoddy, which is part of the Bay of Fundy, and the Island of Grand Menan in the said Bay of Fundy, are claimed by the United States as being comprehended within their aforesaid boundaries, which said Islands are claimed as belonging to His Britannic Majesty as having been at the time of and previous to the aforesaid Treaty of one thousand seven hundred and eighty three within the limits of the Province of Nova Scotia: In order therefore finally to decide upon these claims it is agreed that they shall be referred to two Commissioners to be appointed in the following manner: viz: One Commissioner shall be appointed by His Britannic Majesty and one by the President of the United States, by and with the advice and consent of the Senate thereof, and the said two Commissioners so appointed shall be sworn impartially to examine and decide upon the said claims according to such evidence as shall be laid before them on the part of His Britannic Majesty and of the United States respectively. The said Commissioners shall meet at St Andrews in the Province of New Brunswick, and shall have power to adjourn to such other place or places as they shall think fit. The said Commissioners shall by a declaration or report under their hands and seals decide to which of the two Contracting parties the several Islands aforesaid do respectely belong in conformity with the true intent of the said Treaty of Peace of one thousand seven hundred and eighty three. And if the said Commissioners shall agree in their decision both parties shall consider such decision as final and conclusive. It is further agreed that in the event of the two Commissioners differing upon all or any of the matters so referred to them, or in the event of both or either of the said Commissioners refusing or declining or wilfully omitting to act as such, they shall make jointly or separately a report or reports as well to the Government of His Britannic Majesty as to that of the United States, stating in detail the points on which they differ, and the grounds upon which their respective opinions have been formed, or the grounds upon which they or either of them have so refused declined or omitted to act. And His Britannic Majesty and the Government of the United States hereby agree to refer the report or reports of the said Commissioners to some friendly Sovereign or State to be then named for that purpose, and who shall be requested to decide on the differences which may be stated in the said report or reports, or upon the report of one Commissioner together with the grounds upon which the other Commissioner shall have refused, declined or omitted to act as the case may be. And if the Commissioner so refusing, declining, or omitting to act, shall also wilfully omit to state the grounds upon which he has so done in such manner that the said statement may be referred to such friendly Sovereign or State together with the report of such other Commissioner, then such Sovereign or State shall decide ex parse upon the said report alone. And His Britannic Majesty and the Government of the United States engage to consider the decision of such friendly Sovereign or State to be final and conclusive on all the matters so referred.

In 1817, the joint commission reached a final decision without the need of arbitration. The two Commissioners declared that Moose, Dudley, and Frederick Islands belong to the United States, while Grand Manan and all other islands of the Passamaquoddy Bay belong to the British Empire.

We the said Thomas Barclay and John Holmes Commissioners as aforesaid having been duly sworn impartially to examine and decide upon the said claims according to such evidence as should be laid before us on the part of His Britannic Majesty and The United States respectively Have decided and do decide that Moose Island, Dudley Island, and Frederick Island, in the Bay of Passamaquoddy which is part of the Bay of Fundy do and each of them does belong to The United States of America and we have also decided and do decide that all the other Islands and each and every of them in the said Bay of Passamaquoddy which is part of the Bay of Fundy and the Island of Grand Menan in the said Bay of Fundy do belong to His said Britannic Majesty in conformity with the true intent of the said second Article of said Treaty of One Thousand seven hundred and eighty three.

Machias Seal Island is not directly named, although Grand Manan and nearby islands are settled to be part of British-Canada, as are the coastal islands of Maine to be part of the US. In 1832, fifteen years after the decision, the British built a lighthouse on Machias Seal Island.

=== Later Boundary Treaties (1908, 1910, 1925) ===
Later boundary treaties and negotiations extended the seaward boundary in the Grand Manan Channel in 1908–1910 to its present terminus, roughly equidistant between Grand Manan Island and the coast of Maine, and several nautical miles northeast of Machias Seal Island.

The island has also been claimed by the descendants of "Tall Barney Beal", particularly Barna Norton, who ran boat tours to the island.

== Canadian interest ==
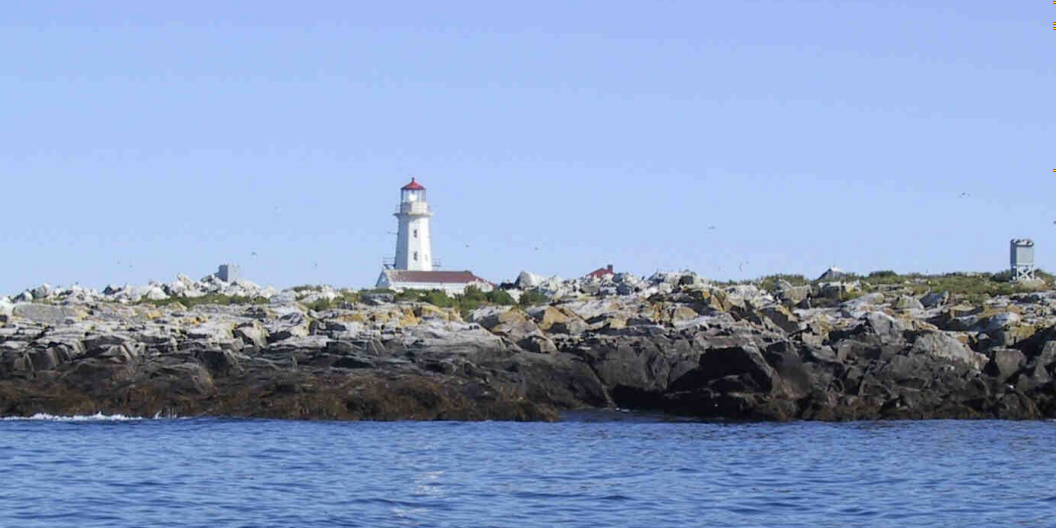
Machias Seal Island lighthouse in 2022.

The United Kingdom, and later Canada, have maintained an ongoing interest in the island, largely through the continuous occupation of the lighthouse. Until the 1970s–1980s, lighthouse keepers from the Canadian Coast Guard would live on the island with their families.

Since 1944, the island has been protected under its designation as the Machias Seal Island Migratory Bird Sanctuary (a wildlife and seabird sanctuary), managed by the Canadian Wildlife Service.

The island has long been included in federal and provincial electoral districts, and policing has been enforced on the island by Royal Canadian Mounted Police and on waters surrounding the island by the Department of Fisheries and Oceans. In the 20th century, some Canadian residents placed mining claims on the island as an exercise of sovereignty, despite the fact that it is considered a protected area.

The federal government acknowledges it does not enforce border-law on Machias Seal Island, in regards to American visitors.

== United States interest ==
In 1918, with Canadian agreement, a small detachment of U.S. Marines was placed on the island following the U.S. entry into the First World War, as a means to assist in protecting the territory and its key lighthouse guarding the entrance to the Bay of Fundy from German U-boat attack. These forces were withdrawn after several months, and no U.S. presence has been re-established since.

== Gulf of Maine boundary ==
Sovereignty of Machias Seal Island (and North Rock) would likely not still be in question today if it were not for the decision by Canada and the United States to avoid settling this issue in their 1979 joint application to the International Court of Justice (ICJ) at The Hague in the Netherlands to have the maritime boundary delineated in the Gulf of Maine for fishing and mineral exploration purposes on Georges Bank.

Both nations avoided having ICJ rule on the sovereignty of Machias Seal Island and North Rock by agreeing to have a common starting point for the offshore boundary southwest of the island at 44°11′12″N 67°16′46″W, as reflected in the final ruling in the case. The gap in the agreed maritime boundary extends for several nautical miles from this point. Machias Seal Island and North Rock lie in an area of overlapping claims, known by local fishers as the "grey zone".

== Conflict in grey zone ==
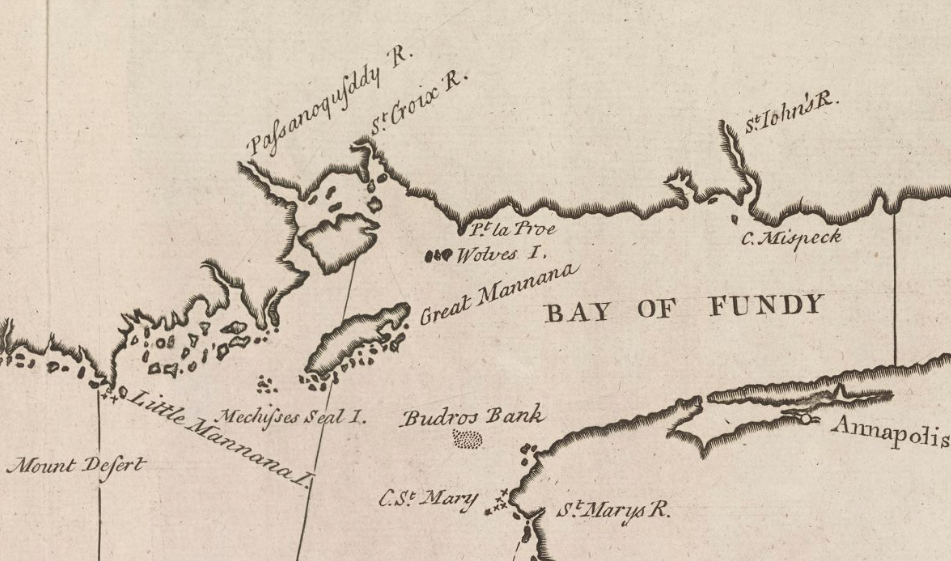
Machias Seal Island, called "Mechyses Seal Island", as it appears on Cyprian Southack's 1731 map.

The "grey zone" is a 39 nmi (72 km) gap between Canada and the United States that was designated in 1977. Without clear ownership of the area, both countries assert fishing efforts that have strained the lobster population and its respective economies. Rules and rights over the "grey zone" are governed by political and social factors, such as increased lobster fishing efforts and different management styles, which becomes a source of conflict when more than one entity seeks to control the space. These political and social factors accentuate resource competition and eventually lead to conflict. The Department of Fisheries and Oceans (DFO) governs the Canadian lobster fisheries, but the United States' fisheries are governed both by the federal and the state governments. The Atlantic States Marine Fisheries Commission governs the federal zone between 3 nmi (6 km) and 200 nmi (370 km) off of Maine, and the state government controls the area within 3 nmi (6 km) offshore.

Canada and the United States separately manage their fisheries' guidelines regarding the use of the "grey zone." The international grey zone boundary led to a fishery dispute between Canadian and US lobster fishers that began in August 2002, when climate change began pushing lobster migration to the area. Within the disputed territory, Canadian and American trap fishers compete to fish for a valuable marine resource, lobster, and do not agree on management and conservation efforts. Fishers from both countries are impacted by drivers of change, including an economic imperative for growth, historical institutional failure in managing the ocean and coastal environment, and a changing social-ecological environment.

Those issues are exacerbated by political and social factors including a lack of clear rules for both sides, which leaves both sides to perceive that the other side is taking what is perceived to be theirs. Both sides express a perception of unfair treatment from the opposing government but are in fact similarly impacted by continuing poor governance and management over the region. Direct conflict arises between fishers from both countries as they feel that their well-being is threatened, and they attempt to take matters into their own hands. That has led to destruction of each other's property and threats of harm. That tied hand in hand with the unfair treatment of fishermen who were trying to fish in the grey zone, an area that was deemed “undisputed land.” The reliance on lobster fishing from both the Canadian and American sides quickly became competitive for lobster.

Both Canadian and American fishers have expressed concern about conservation and their need for security of supply; however, the continued escalation of the conflict between them only fuels damage to stocks and puts future harvests at risk for fishers of both countries. Canadians favored closure of the summer season to all fishers so that the lobster population had the opportunity to spawn and reproduce; Americans favored maximum catch limitations. Canadian fisheries perceived a decrease in their catch due to American fishing efforts during the Canadian off-season and responded by allowing their fisheries to operate during the same time period. The conflict over the "grey zone" was exacerbated when both countries' catch declined as well as the lobster population. The overlying issue is conservation of the lobster population; however, the governing bodies from Canada and the United States have differing opinions regarding management. This lack of cooperation from both nations perpetuated conflict that led to stock depletion.

== Current status ==
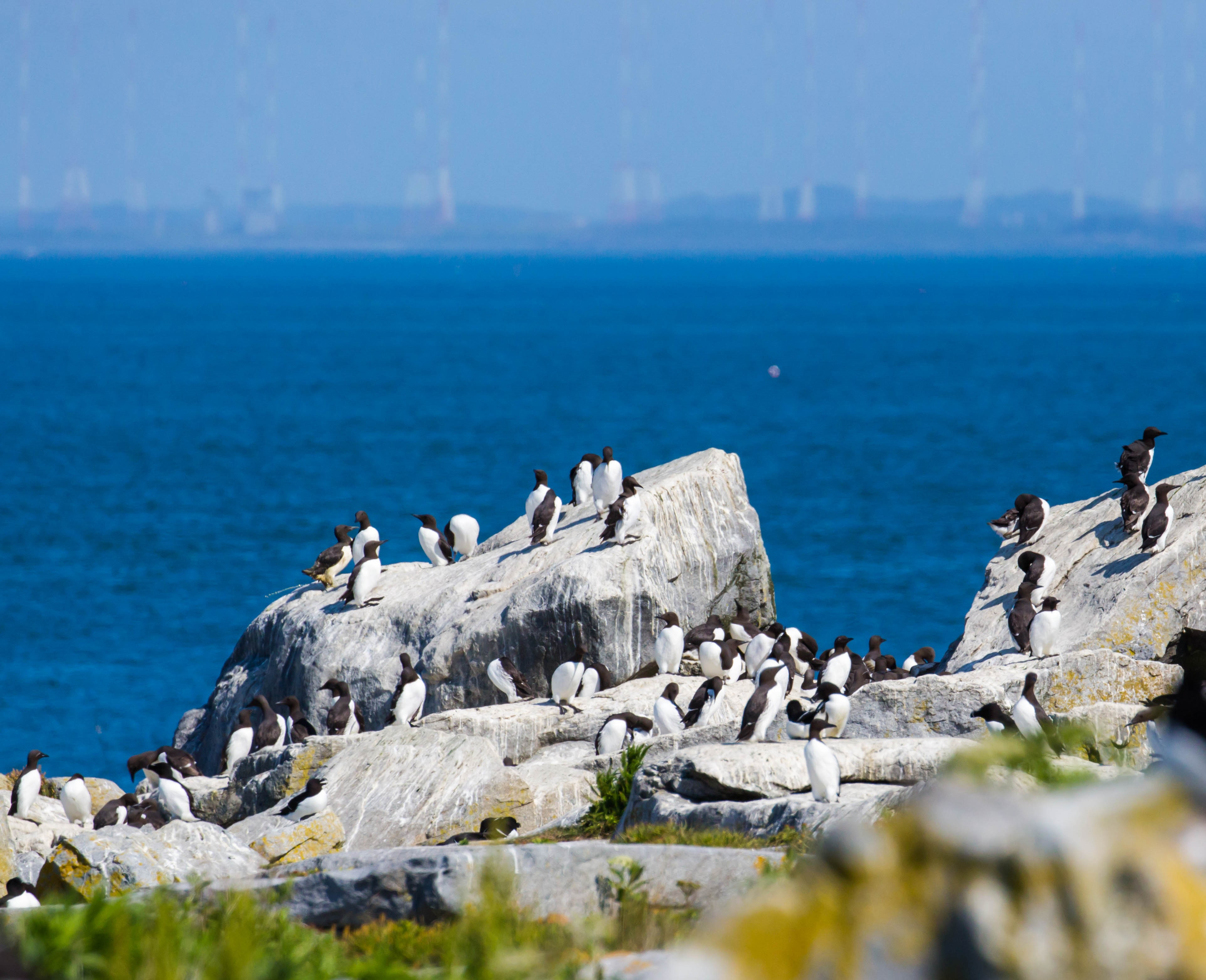
Common murres and a few razorbills on the rocky island

Since the 1984 ICJ ruling on the Gulf of Maine decided the fate of offshore boundaries, Machias Seal Island and neighbouring North Rock, an exposed rock outcropping about 2.2 nautical miles (4.1 km) north-northeast at 44°32′15″N 67°05′10″W, as well as the surrounding waters, have become a political football for local politicians in fishing communities of coastal Charlotte County, New Brunswick and Washington County, Maine. There are few or no mineral or petroleum resources in the "grey zone" although there is a valuable lobster fishery, and fishermen from both countries exploit the lack of rules in the "grey zone" by overfishing various species.

In 1995, the Canadian Coast Guard dramatically reduced the number of staffed lighthouses on the Atlantic coast as a cost-saving measure. Today, all lighthouses in the Maritimes except for the station on Machias Seal Island are unstaffed. The Machias Seal Island light had been automated several years prior to the announcement, but Global Affairs Canada is now covering the Canadian Coast Guard's costs to maintain lightkeepers on Machias Seal Island "for sovereignty purposes."

The DFO had issued an updated sustainability development strategy to involve a commitment to knowledge and technology for sustainable development between 2001 and 2003. The two goals were to better understand the nature and use of marine and fresh water resources and ecosystems to support decision making, and to effectively apply that knowledge and new technology to support safe and sustainable use of marine and freshwater resources.

Two lightkeepers are permanently stationed at the island's lone residence, rotating 4-week shifts by helicopter from Saint John. The Coast Guard employees also assist the Canadian Wildlife Service in maintaining the Migratory Bird Sanctuary and help any wildlife researchers who may stay on the island for a period of time.

== See also ==
- List of areas disputed by Canada and the United States
- List of islands of Maine
- List of islands of New Brunswick
- List of lighthouses in Maine
- List of lighthouses in New Brunswick
