= List of areas disputed by Canada and the United States =

Canada and the United States have two land disputes over Machias Seal Island and North Rock (both off the Atlantic coast of Maine), and four other maritime disputes in the Arctic and Pacific. The two countries share the world's longest international border and have a long history of disputes over its demarcation (see Canada–United States border).

== Present disputes ==
Seal Island Disputed Territory

=== Machias Seal Island area ===
Machias Seal Island 8.1 ha (20 acres)—and North Rock (Maine and New Brunswick) located in what is known as the "Grey Zone" (about 717 km^{2} (277 sq mi) in size), is occupied by a Canadian lighthouse but claimed by the United States and visited by U.S. tour boats. The area is patrolled by the Canadian and US Coast Guard, but the Canadian Coast Guard occupies the lighthouse. The unresolved maritime boundary breaks into two elements: the sovereignty of the island and the location of the maritime boundary, taking into account who is the rightful owner of the island. Because the island includes rich fishing grounds, it has added economic value.

Strait of Juan de Fuca Disputed Area

=== Strait of Juan de Fuca ===
Strait of Juan de Fuca (Washington state and British Columbia): At the mouth of the strait, both countries declared fishing zones in 1977. Each country used a mildly differing method to define an equidistant water boundary. The two separate water areas in dispute amount to about 51.5 km^{2} (19.9 sq mi).

Beaufort Sea Disputed Area

=== Beaufort Sea ===
Canada supports an extension into the sea of the land boundary between Yukon and Alaska. The U.S. does not, and instead supports a line equidistant from the coastline. Such a demarcation means that a minor portion claimed by Canada as the Northwest Territories Exclusive Economic Zone (EEZ) is also claimed by the U.S. because the EEZ boundary between the Northwest Territories and Yukon follows a straight north-south line into the sea. The U.S. claims would create a triangular-shaped EEZ for Yukon/Canada. The disputed area is about 21,440 km^{2} (8,280 sq mi) in size. The precise translation of a phrase in the Anglo-Russian Convention of 1825, which was written in French, is part of the issue. The convention makes reference to the 141st Meridian "in its prolongation as far as the Frozen Ocean." The authentic text is in French: "dans son [sic] prolongation jusqu’à la Mer Glaciale." The precise question is the interpretation that should be given to the preposition "jusqu’à." Specifically, is it inclusive or exclusive of the object to which the preposition relates? This dispute is intensified because there are oil and gas reserves in the region.

=== Northwest Passage ===
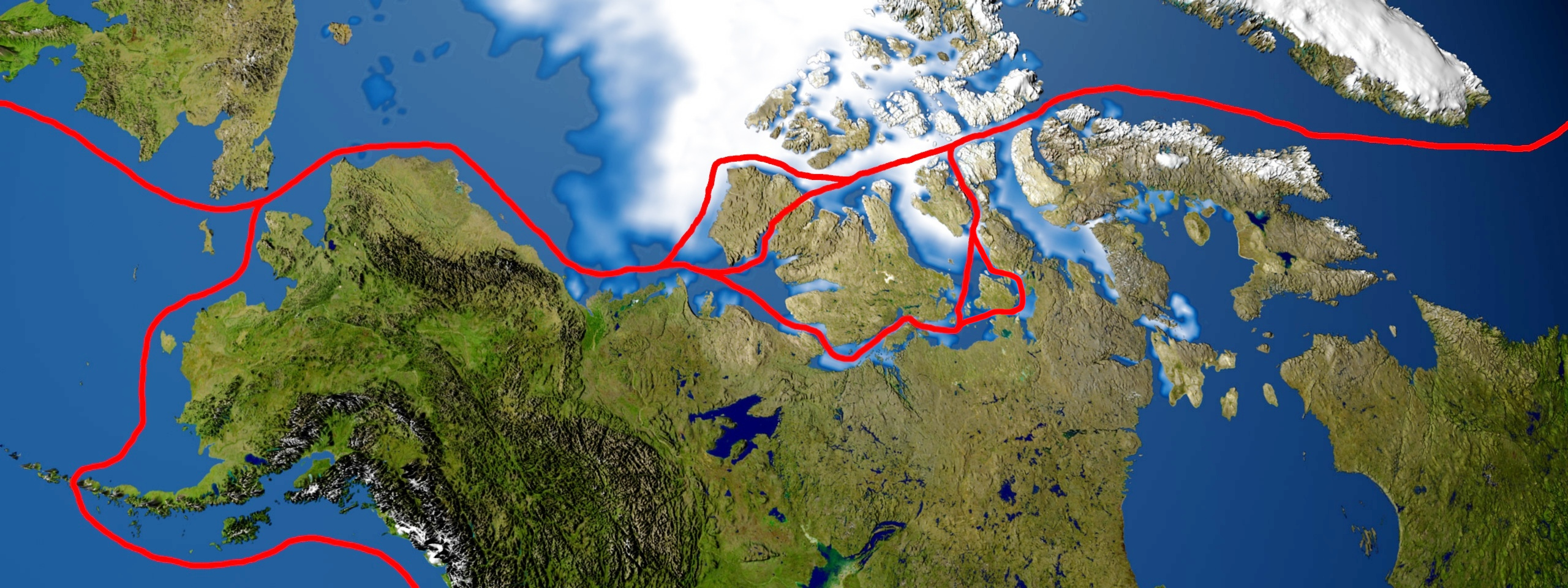
Northwest Passage routes

Canada claims the Northwest Passage as part of Canadian Internal Waters, while the United States regards it as an international strait (a strait accommodating open international traffic). The United States did not recognize Canada's restated claim for the passage in 1986. The Canadian Coast Guard and Royal Canadian Navy have commissioned a new icebreaker along with multiple offshore patrol ships to guard and patrol the waters. Recently, the reduction of sea ice in this region has made navigating the passage without an icebreaker more viable; as movement through the passage becomes easier, there is a likelihood for this dispute to intensify.

=== Dixon Entrance ===
Dixon Entrance Disputed Area

Dixon Entrance (Alaska and British Columbia) contains two water areas that are mutually claimed by Canada and the United States. A line known as the "A-B" Line was defined in a 1903 arbitration decision on the Alaska/British Columbia boundary. The court specified the initial boundary point (Point "A") at the northern end of Dixon Entrance and designated Point "B" 72 NM to the east. Canada relies on the "A-B" line as rendering nearly all of Dixon Entrance as its internal waters. The U.S. does not recognize the "A-B" line as an official boundary, instead regarding it as allocating sovereignty over the land masses within the Dixon Entrance, with Canada's land south of the line. The U.S. regards the waters as subject to international marine law, and in 1977, it defined an equidistant territorial line throughout the Dixon Entrance, mainly to the south of the "A-B" line. The intersecting lines create four separate water areas with differing claim status. The two areas south of the "A-B" line (about 2,789 km^{2} (1,077 sq mi) and 51.5 km^{2} (19.9 sq mi) in size) are claimed by both countries. The other two water areas are north of the "A-B" line and are not claimed by either country. The two unclaimed areas are about 72 km^{2} (28 sq mi) and 1.4 km^{2} (0.5 sq mi) in size. In addition, Nunez Rocks is a low-tide elevation (LTE) ("bare at half-tide") that lies south of the "A-B" Line, surrounded by the sea territory claimed by the U.S. The United States has not ratified the Law of the Sea Treaty, although it adheres to most of its principles as customary international law. Under the treaty, LTEs may be used as base points for a territorial sea, and the U.S. uses Nunez Rocks as a base point. As a non-signatory, however, nothing is preventing the U.S. from claiming areas beyond the scope of the Law of the Sea Treaty. The fact remains that, for about half of each day, above-water territory that Canada regards as Canadian is surrounded by sea territory that the U.S. has declared to be American.

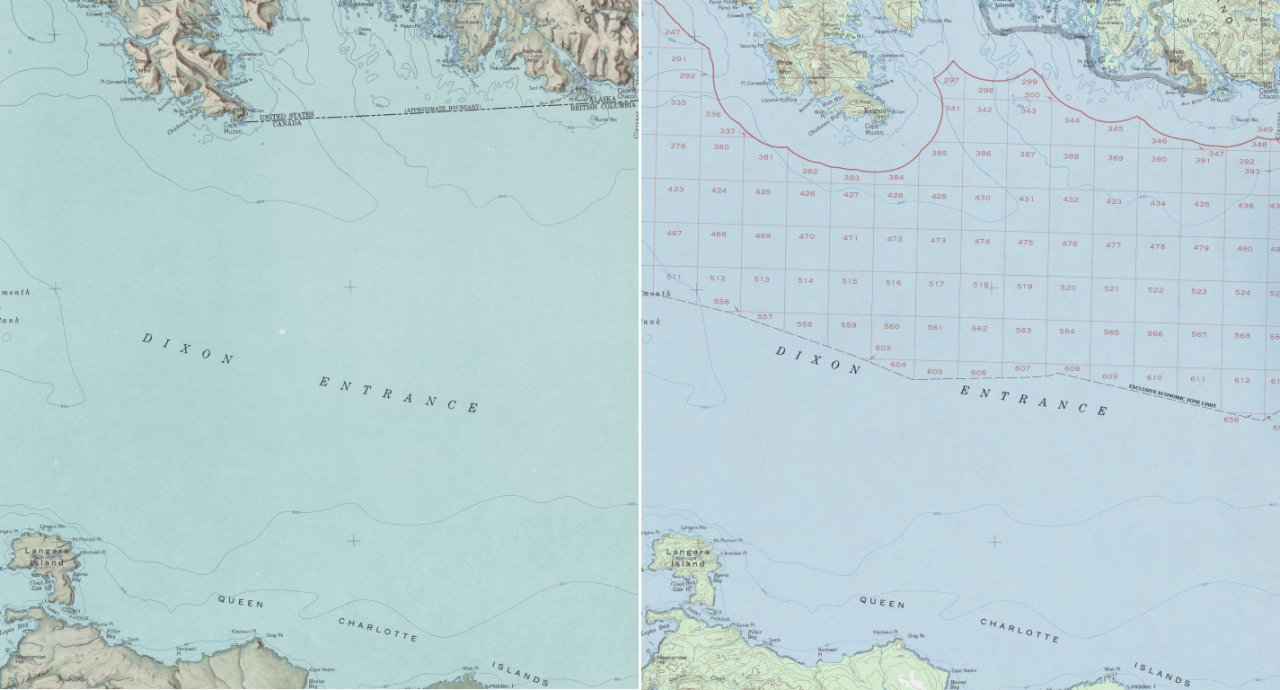
Maps of the Dixon Entrance showing the A-B Line of 1903 (left) and the boundary currently claimed by the U.S. (right).

== Historical disputes ==
- Alaska boundary dispute (Alaska/British Columbia and Yukon) lasted from 1821 to 1903
  - Atlin District
  - Bering Sea Arbitration lasted from 1881 to 1893.
- Aroostook War (Maine/New Brunswick), a bloodless dispute that lasted from 1838 to 1839, leading to the Webster–Ashburton negotiations.
  - Republic of Madawaska (Maine/New Brunswick), putative state in 1827, within the territory that became part of New Brunswick in 1842.
- Oregon boundary dispute (Columbia District and New Caledonia/Oregon Country)
  - Pig War (Colony of Vancouver Island/Washington Territory) took place in 1859
- Republic of Indian Stream (New Hampshire/Lower Canada) unrecognized state from 1832 to 1835. Now part of New Hampshire.

== Coordinates ==
- Machias Seal Island 44°30′10″N 67°06′10″W
- North Rock 44°32′16″N 67°05′13″W
- Strait of Juan de Fuca 48°17′58″N 124°02′58″W
- Dixon Entrance 54°22′N 132°20′W
- Beaufort Sea 72°01′40″N 137°02′30″W

== See also ==
- Colonial history of the United States
- Former colonies and territories in Canada
- List of territorial disputes
- Territorial evolution of Canada after 1867
