= Mount Bulyea =

Mountain in the country of Canada

- Location within Alberta Location within British Columbia Location within Canada

Highest point
- Elevation: 3,332 m (10,932 ft) (Note: Other sources give 3,304 metres.)
- Prominence: 132 m (433 ft)
- Listing: Mountains of Alberta; Mountains of British Columbia
- Coordinates: 51°43′00″N 116°55′24″W

Geography
- Country: Canada
- Provinces: Alberta and British Columbia
- Protected area: Banff National Park
- Parent range: Park Ranges
- Topo map: NTS 82N10 Blaeberry River

Climbing
- First ascent: 1910 J.E.C. Eaton, H. Burgener.

Mount Bulyea is located in Banff National Park on the border of Alberta and British Columbia. It was named in 1920 after Hon. George H. V. Bulyea, a Canadian Pacific Railway employee and first Lieutenant Governor of Alberta.

== See also ==
- List of peaks on the British Columbia–Alberta border
- List of mountains in the Canadian Rockies
