= Swift Point Lighthouse =

Lighthouse in New Brunswick, Canada

Swift Point Light
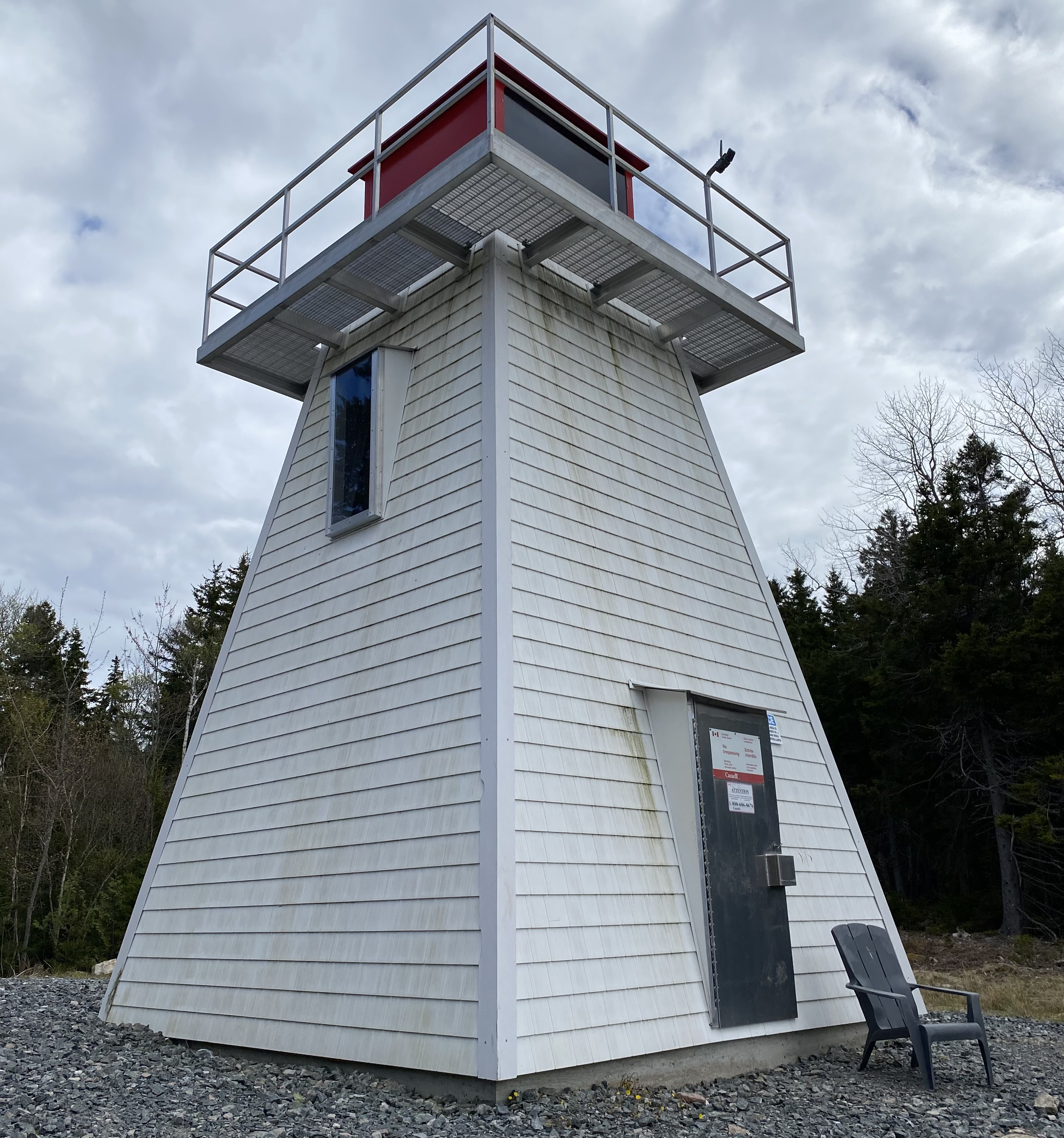
- Swift Point Lighthouse in May 2024
- Location: Saint John, Canada
- Coordinates: 45°16′57″N 66°07′17″W

Tower
- Constructed: 1869
- Height: 13.9 m (46 ft)
- Shape: square pyramid
- Power source: solar energy
- Operator: Canadian Coast Guard

Light
- Focal height: 28.1 m (92 ft)
- Characteristic: Fl G 4s

The Swift Point Lighthouse, also known as the Green Head Lighthouse, is an active lighthouse in Saint John, New Brunswick. Located along the entrance of the Saint John River, Swift Point Lighthouse was built along the river along with five other lighthouses in 1869. The lighthouse is owned and operated by the Canadian Coast Guard, and is accessible through a dirt road measuring around 1 kilometre (0.62 mi). The area is a frequented hiking and geocaching spot.

== History ==
On August 20, 1869, Swift Point Lighthouse began operating along with five other lighthouses sitting by the Saint John River. Its first keeper was John Nelson Williams, who worked there from 1869 to 1889. The Swift Point Lighthouse was later rebuilt in 1896 due to the Department of Marine reporting it to be in bad condition.

During the evening of June 14, 2017, the Swift Point Lighthouse caught fire. Due to remoteness of the tower, firefighters who travelled to the location by foot were unable to save the building on time, and it was later rebuilt by the Canadian Coast Guard in January 2018 with an equipped solar power source. According to the fire department in Saint John, the cause of the fire was unable to be determined.
