= Beaver Harbour, New Brunswick =

Beaver Harbour
- Local service district
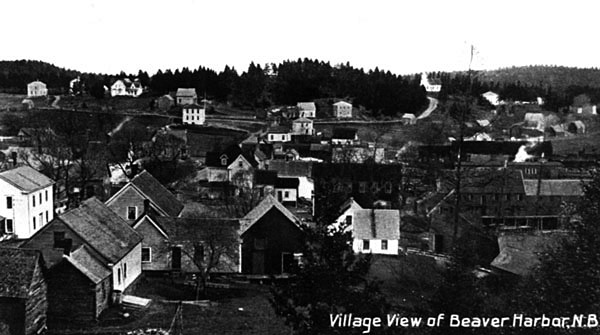
- Beaver Harbour in 1920

- Location within New Brunswick.
- Coordinates: 45°04′23″N 66°44′34″W
- Country: Canada
- Province: New Brunswick
- County: Charlotte
- Electoral Districts Federal: New Brunswick Southwest
- Provincial: Charlotte-The Isles

Area
  - Total: 2.25 km^{2} (0.87 sq mi)

Population (2021)
  - Total: 291
  - Density: 129.3/km^{2} (335/sq mi)
  - Pop 2016-2021: ▲5.1%
  - Dwellings: 142
- Time zone: UTC-4 (AST)
  - Summer (DST): UTC-3 (ADT)
- Postal code(s): E5H
- Area code: 506
- Highways: Route 778

Beaver Harbour (formerly Belle Vue) is a community on the Fundy shore of New Brunswick, Canada.

Most of the community forms the Local service district of Beaver Harbour, which was established in 1971. It is also a census subdivision of Census Canada. Since the formation of the LSD, the community has expanded past the original boundaries into the LSD of the parish of Pennfield.

In 1866 it had about 30 resident families, and grew to a population of 150 by 1871, the 500 in 1898. As of 2021, the population was 291.

It is the site of the Lighthouse Point Light, originally built in 1875 and subsequently rebuilt. It is a fiberglass tapered cylindrical tower with balcony and lantern.

== History ==
Beaver Harbour was first settled in 1783 by Quaker loyalists who had fled Pennsylvania as a result of the American Revolution.

It became the first settlement in British North America to forbid slavery, with 49 names of families being attached to a founding constitution which barred slave owners from living there.

== Demographics ==
In the 2021 Census of Population conducted by Statistics Canada, Beaver Harbour had a population of 291 living in 130 of its 142 total private dwellings, a change of 5.1% from its 2016 population of 277. With a land area of 2.25 km^{2} (0.87 sq mi), it had a population density of 129.3/km^{2} (335.0/sq mi) in 2021.
