= North Rock =

Disputed island in Canada / USA

Disputed rock
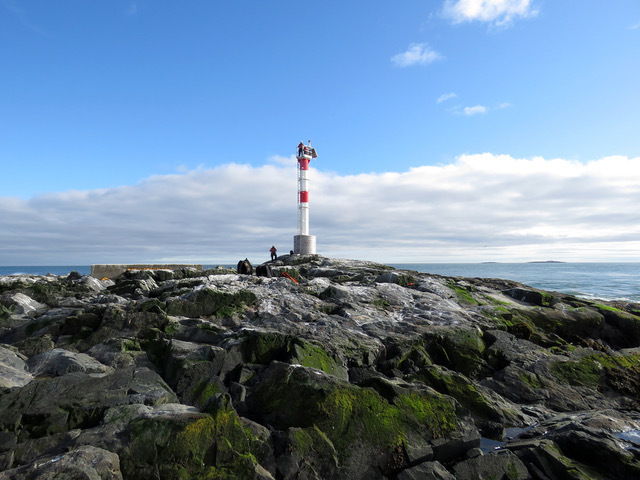
- Canadian navigation aid on North Rock
- Interactive map of North Rock

Geography
- Location: border of the Bay of Fundy and the Gulf of Maine
- Coordinates: 44°32′16″N 67°5′13″W

Administration
- Canada
- Province: New Brunswick

Claimed by
- Canada
- Province: New Brunswick
- United States
- State: Maine

Demographics
- Population: 0

North Rock is an offshore rock near the boundary between the Gulf of Maine and the Bay of Fundy east of the North American continent. Its ownership is disputed between the Canadian province of New Brunswick and the U.S. state of Maine as part of the territorial and maritime boundary dispute surrounding Machias Seal Island nearby to the south. The disputed area is referred to colloquially as the "Grey Zone".

It hosts a population of seals.

== See also ==
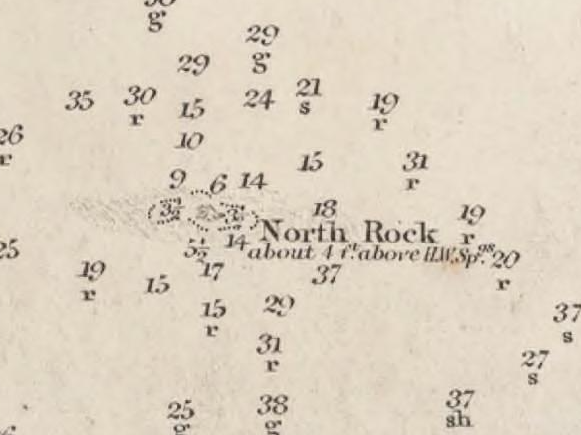
1855 chart of North Rock

- List of areas disputed by the United States and Canada
- List of islands of Maine
- List of islands of New Brunswick
