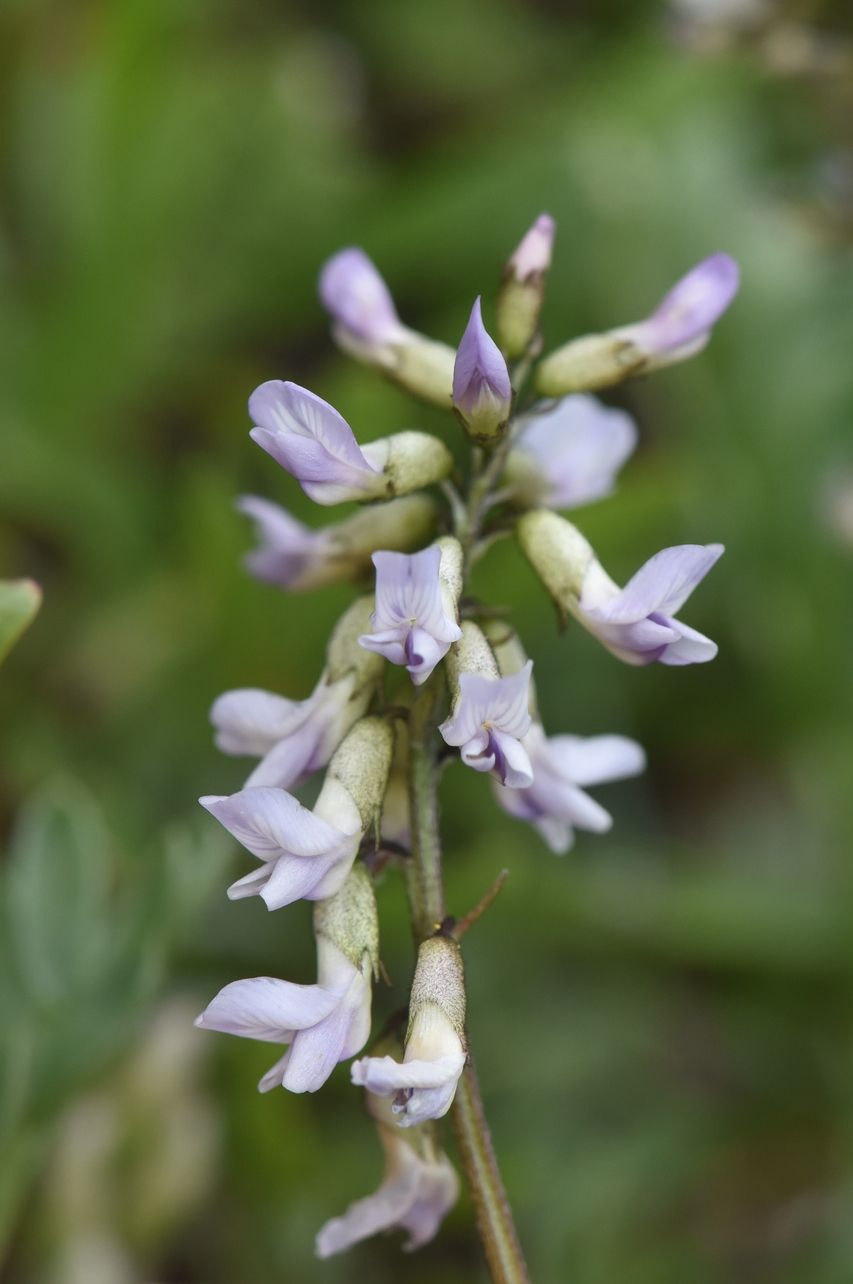
- flower

Conservation status
- Secure (NatureServe)

Scientific classification
- Kingdom: Plantae
- Clade: Tracheophytes
- Clade: Angiosperms
- Clade: Eudicots
- Clade: Rosids
- Order: Fabales
- Family: Fabaceae
- Subfamily: Faboideae
- Genus: Astragalus
- Species: A. robbinsii

Binomial name
- Astragalus robbinsii (Oakes) A.Gray, 1856

= Astragalus robbinsii =

Species of legume

Astragalus robbinsii is a species of milkvetch known by the common name Robbins's milkvetch. It is native to North America, where it is widespread with several varieties originating from different regions.

- A. r. var. alpiniformis is endemic to Oregon.
- A. r. var. fernaldii is known from Quebec and Newfoundland and Labrador.
- A. r. var. harringtonii is endemic to Alaska.
- A. r. var. jesupii is a rare variety known only from three locations on the Connecticut River in New Hampshire and Vermont and is a federally listed endangered species.
- A. r. var. minor, the most widespread variety, can be found in western North America and eastern Canada.
- A. r. var. occidentalis is a rare variety endemic to the Ruby Mountains of Nevada.
- A. r. var. robbinsii is endemic to Vermont.
