= Pointe-Sapin, New Brunswick =

Pointe-Sapin
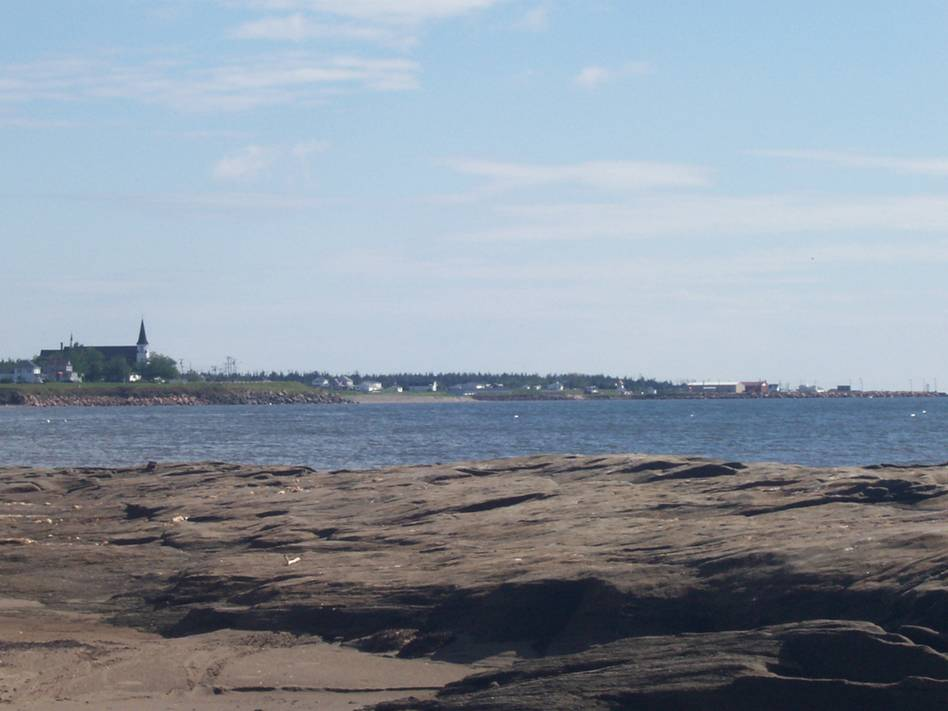
- Pointe Sapin

- Location of Pointe-Sapin in New Brunswick
- Coordinates: 46.9687°N 64.8236°W
- Country: Canada
- Province: New Brunswick
- County: Kent County
- Lowest elevation: 0 m (0 ft)

Population (2011)
  - Total: 350
- Time zone: UTC-4 (Atlantic (AST))
  - Summer (DST): UTC-3 (ADT)
- Area code: 506
- NTS Map: 21I10 Richibucto

Pointe-Sapin is a settlement on the northern coast of New Brunswick, Canada, on the Northumberland Strait in the Gulf of St. Lawrence. As a designated place in the 2011 Census, it had a population of 350 living in 165 of its 192 total private dwellings. Pointe-Sapin lies in the Atlantic Time Zone (AST/ADT) and observes daylight saving time.

The former local service district of Pointe-Sapin took its name from the community but included all of Carleton Parish east of Kouchibouguac National Park.

== Demographics ==
In the 2021 Census of Population conducted by Statistics Canada, Pointe-Sapin had a population of 475 living in 223 of its 257 total private dwellings, a change of −0.4% from its 2016 population of 477. With a land area of 71.54 km^{2} (27.62 sq mi), it had a population density of 6.6/km^{2} (17.2/sq mi) in 2021.

== See also ==
- List of communities in New Brunswick
