= List of historic places in Kent County, New Brunswick =

This article is a list of historic places in Kent County, New Brunswick entered on the Canadian Register of Historic Places, whether they are federal, provincial, or municipal.

== List of historic places ==
Name	Address	Coordinates	Government recognition (CRHP №)	Wikidata ID	Image
Albert, Allain, Robitaille et Cormier House	8 Bellevue Street; Bouctouche NB	46°28′25″N 64°43′13″W	Bouctouche municipality (7925)		Upload Photo
Télesphore Arsenault Residence	9446 Main Street; Richibucto NB	46°41′14″N 64°51′49″W	Richibucto municipality (15704)		Upload Photo
Ballast Heaps	In the Richibucto River; Richibucto NB	46°41′16″N 64°51′17″W	Richibucto municipality (16346)		Upload Photo
MLA James Barnes's House	53 Acadie Avenue; Bouctouche NB	46°27′59″N 64°42′35″W	Bouctouche municipality (5384)		Upload Photo
Birthplace of Louis J. Robichaud	4 Camille Avenue; Champdoré NB	46°21′43″N 64°45′09″W	Champdoré municipality (7291)		Upload Photo
Bonar Law House	31 Bonar Law Avenue (Route 116); Five Rivers NB	46°38′38″N 64°52′50″W	New Brunswick (6215)		
Bordage General Store	10520 Principale Street; Saint-Louis-de-Kent NB	46°44′11″N 64°58′20″W	Saint-Louis-de-Kent municipality (5909)		Upload Photo
Camille Bordage Pharmacie	9382 Main Street; Richibucto NB	46°40′56″N 64°51′46″W	Richibucto municipality (15762)		Upload Photo
Bouctouche Seaport	Irving Boulevard; Bouctouche NB	46°28′21″N 64°43′09″W	Bouctouche municipality (5410)		Upload Photo
Bouctouche Train Station Site	De la Riviere Street; Bouctouche NB	46°28′15″N 64°43′17″W	Bouctouche municipality (8692)		Upload Photo
Bourque-Robichaud House	9398 Main Street; Richibucto NB	46°41′01″N 64°51′44″W	Richibucto municipality (15744)		Upload Photo
Brait House	1 School Street; Five Rivers NB	46°38′33″N 64°52′13″W	Five Rivers municipality (5240)		Upload Photo
Brideau House	10 542 Principale Street; Saint-Louis-de-Kent NB	46°44′15″N 64°58′26″W	Saint-Louis-de-Kent municipality (7905)		Upload Photo
Burns Mill Site	44 Sunset Drive; Five Rivers NB	46°38′29″N 64°52′41″W	Five Rivers municipality (5448)		Upload Photo
Camille Vautour Presbytery	24 de l'Eglise Avenue; Champdoré NB	46°21′48″N 64°45′18″W	Champdoré municipality (7342)		Upload Photo
Carrefour de la culture acadienne	de l'Eglise Avenue; Champdoré NB	46°21′48″N 64°45′15″W	Champdoré municipality (7096)		Upload Photo
The Cedars	78 Main Street; Five Rivers NB	46°39′08″N 64°52′40″W	Five Rivers municipality (4136)		Upload Photo
Church of the Immaculate Conception	8 School Street; Five Rivers NB	46°38′29″N 64°52′15″W	Five Rivers municipality (4143)		Upload Photo
Church of the Immaculate Conception Cemetery	16 School Street; Five Rivers NB	46°38′25″N 64°52′14″W	Five Rivers municipality (5541)		Upload Photo
Convent of the Immaculate Conception	150 du Couvent Road; Bouctouche NB	46°28′50″N 64°41′57″W	New Brunswick (2498)		
Cradle of the Acadian Flag	Located at the corner of Principale Street and Cote Nord Road; Saint-Louis-de-Kent NB	46°44′31″N 64°58′53″W	Saint-Louis-de-Kent municipality (6156)		Upload Photo
Lestock DesBrisay House	9388 Main Street; Richibucto NB	46°40′56″N 64°51′45″W	Richibucto municipality (15705)		Upload Photo
First Stella-Maris Hospital	127 Du Couvent Road; Bouctouche NB	46°28′44″N 64°42′07″W	Bouctouche municipality (8312)		Upload Photo
The Forge	10 610 Principale Street; Saint-Louis-de-Kent NB	46°44′28″N 64°58′49″W	Saint-Louis-de-Kent municipality (7904)		Upload Photo
Former Bouctouche Railway Route	Yvon Street; Champdoré NB	46°21′48″N 64°45′01″W	Champdoré municipality (7396)		Upload Photo
Former Home of MP Gilbert Girouard	20 Bellevue Street; Bouctouche NB	46°28′27″N 64°43′13″W	Bouctouche municipality (5525)		Upload Photo
Former Railway Station	10617 Principale Street; Saint-Louis-de-Kent NB	46°44′33″N 64°58′49″W	Saint-Louis-de-Kent municipality (6635)		Upload Photo
Founders' Site	17 Caissie Street; Champdoré NB	46°21′42″N 64°45′50″W	Champdoré municipality (7357)		Upload Photo
Grotto and Calvary	Principale Street; Saint-Louis-de-Kent NB	46°44′21″N 64°58′40″W	Saint-Louis-de-Kent municipality (5960)		
Higho de Cocagne Institutional Centre	98 de l'Eglise Avenue; Champdoré NB	46°21′48″N 64°45′49″W	Champdoré municipality (7358)		Upload Photo
Jardine's Inn	104 Main Street; Five Rivers NB	46°38′57″N 64°52′35″W	Five Rivers municipality (4852)		Upload Photo
John Jardine House	30 King Street; Five Rivers NB	46°38′44″N 64°51′53″W	Five Rivers municipality (4493)		Upload Photo
Kent Northern Hotel	125 Main Street; Five Rivers NB	46°38′50″N 64°52′27″W	Five Rivers municipality (5415)		Upload Photo
Lanigan and Bowser Mill Site	At the end of North Street; Five Rivers NB	46°38′52″N 64°52′10″W	Five Rivers municipality (4489)		Upload Photo
LeBlanc House	4511 Principale Street; Champdoré NB	46°21′41″N 64°45′00″W	Champdoré municipality (7364)		Upload Photo
Gilbert Léger Store	4543 Principale Street; Champdoré NB	46°21′47″N 64°45′09″W	Champdoré municipality (7378)		Upload Photo
Léger Brothers Mill Site	7 Champ Dore Road; Champdoré NB	46°22′13″N 64°45′39″W	Champdoré municipality (7393)		Upload Photo
The Lilacs	33 Sunset Drive; Five Rivers NB	46°38′26″N 64°52′33″W	Five Rivers municipality (4491)		Upload Photo
Masonic Hall	9378 Main Street; Richibucto NB	46°40′53″N 64°51′45″W	Richibucto municipality (15745)		Upload Photo
Dr. Lawrence McLaren House	15 Acadie Street; Richibucto NB	46°40′31″N 64°52′04″W	Richibucto municipality (15703)		Upload Photo
McLeod-Mundle House	9420 Main Street; Richibucto NB	46°41′04″N 64°51′44″W	Richibucto municipality (15706)		Upload Photo
François-Xavier Michaud Manse	157 chemin du Couvent; Bouctouche NB	46°28′21″N 64°43′20″W	Bouctouche municipality (5351)		Upload Photo
Monument to the Founding Families of Bouctouche	between 70 and 76 Acadie Avenue; Bouctouche NB	46°27′57″N 64°42′28″W	Bouctouche municipality (5405)		Upload Photo
Old Bouctouche Post Office	59 Irving Boulevard; Bouctouche NB	46°28′17″N 64°43′20″W	Bouctouche municipality (5344)		Upload Photo
Old Kingston Hall	79 Main Street; Five Rivers NB	46°39′07″N 64°52′35″W	Five Rivers municipality (4106)		Upload Photo
Daniel O'Leary Property	92 Acadie Street; Richibucto NB	46°40′54″N 64°51′52″W	Richibucto municipality (15748)		Upload Photo
Henry O'Leary House	9402 Main Street; Richibucto NB	46°41′01″N 64°51′44″W	Richibucto municipality (15761)		Upload Photo
de Olloqui House	12 Sunset Drive; Five Rivers NB	46°38′32″N 64°52′20″W	Five Rivers municipality (4748)		Upload Photo
Palmer's Store	125 Main Street; Five Rivers NB	46°38′49″N 64°52′29″W	Five Rivers municipality (5540)		Upload Photo
Picnic Grounds	Corner of Principale Street and Cape Road; Saint-Louis-de-Kent NB	46°44′12″N 64°58′17″W	Saint-Louis-de-Kent municipality (5959)		Upload Photo
Pioneers' Cemetery	69 de l'Eglise Avenue; Champdoré NB	46°21′46″N 64°45′41″W	Champdoré municipality (7361)		Upload Photo
Pointe-à-Jacquot	Du Couvent Road; Bouctouche NB	46°28′44″N 64°41′47″W	Bouctouche municipality (9470)		Upload Photo
Post Office of 1897	119 Main Street; Five Rivers NB	46°38′51″N 64°52′27″W	Five Rivers municipality (5546)		Upload Photo
Presbyterian Church	59 Acadie Street; Richibucto NB	46°40′45″N 64°51′57″W	Richibucto municipality (15773)		Upload Photo
Renzetta Residence	21 Court Street; Richibucto NB	46°40′49″N 64°51′51″W	Richibucto municipality (15702)		Upload Photo
Rexton Bridge	135 Route 134; Five Rivers NB	46°38′41″N 64°52′24″W	Five Rivers municipality (16145)		Upload Photo
Richibucto Marine Hospital	36 Indian Rock Lane; Five Rivers NB	46°39′35″N 64°52′07″W	Five Rivers municipality (1943)		Upload Photo
Royal Bank	9393 Main Street; Richibucto NB	46°40′57″N 64°51′44″W	Richibucto municipality (15770)		Upload Photo
Sacré-Cœur Chapel	150 chemin du Couvent; Bouctouche NB	46°28′50″N 64°42′01″W	Bouctouche municipality (5409)		Upload Photo
St. Andrew's United Church	21 Water Street; Five Rivers NB	46°38′55″N 64°52′20″W	Five Rivers municipality (4740)		
St. Andrew's United Church Cemetery	22 North Street; Five Rivers NB	46°38′56″N 64°52′17″W	Five Rivers municipality (5416)		Upload Photo
Saint-Antoine l'Ermite Church	28 de l'Eglise Avenue; Champdoré NB	46°21′47″N 64°45′18″W	Champdoré municipality (7366)		Upload Photo
Saint-Jean-Baptiste Church	21 Irving Boulevard; Bouctouche NB	46°28′25″N 64°43′14″W	Bouctouche municipality (5404)		
Saint-Jean-Baptiste Parish Manse	19 Irving Boulevard; Bouctouche NB	46°28′24″N 64°43′15″W	Bouctouche municipality (6615)		Upload Photo
St. John the Evangelist Anglican Church	2 Queen Street; Five Rivers NB	46°38′34″N 64°52′08″W	Five Rivers municipality (1968)		Upload Photo
St. Lawrence Anglican Church	42 Acadie Street; Bouctouche NB	46°28′04″N 64°42′38″W	New Brunswick (2574), Bouctouche municipality (6613)		Upload Photo
Saint-Louis College Site	8 Cote Nord Road; Saint-Louis-de-Kent NB	46°44′30″N 64°58′53″W	Saint-Louis-de-Kent municipality (6834)		Upload Photo
Saint-Louis-de-Gonzague Church	9440 Main Street; Richibucto NB	46°41′14″N 64°51′49″W	Richibucto municipality (15750)		
Sisters of the Congregation of Notre-Dame Convent	9 Soleil-Couchant Street; Saint-Louis-de-Kent NB	46°44′15″N 64°58′33″W	Saint-Louis-de-Kent municipality (7906)		Upload Photo
Site of the Former Agricultural Society Establishments	124 Irving Boulevard; Bouctouche NB	46°28′08″N 64°43′33″W	Bouctouche municipality (9959)		Upload Photo
Site of the Old Butter Factory	10 575 Principale Street; Saint-Louis-de-Kent NB	46°44′25″N 64°58′37″W	Saint-Louis-de-Kent municipality (5910)		Upload Photo
Soy-Irving House	1 Water Street; Five Rivers NB	46°38′56″N 64°52′35″W	Five Rivers municipality (10629)		Upload Photo
John Stevenson House	9336 Main Street; Richibucto NB	46°40′42″N 64°51′49″W	Richibucto municipality (15707)		Upload Photo
H. O. Stewart General Store	127 Main Street; Five Rivers NB	46°38′49″N 64°52′27″W	Five Rivers municipality (5431)		Upload Photo
Tower	Caissie Point; Dundas NB	46°19′12″N 64°30′45″W	Federal (10989)		Upload Photo
Wolastoq National Historic Site of Canada	Entire watershed of Saint John River central and western New Brunswick, parts of southeastern Quebec NB	46°19′43″N 65°37′08″W	Federal (18954)		More images
The Yard	45,47,49 River Street; Five Rivers NB	46°38′47″N 64°51′56″W	Five Rivers municipality (4668)		Upload Photo

== See also ==
- List of historic places in New Brunswick
- List of National Historic Sites of Canada in New Brunswick
