= List of historic places in Madawaska County, New Brunswick =

This is a list of historic places in Madawaska County, New Brunswick entered on the Canadian Register of Historic Places, whether they are federal, provincial, or municipal.

== List of historic places ==
Name	Address	Coordinates	Government recognition (CRHP №)	Wikidata ID	Image
Albert Cross	Des Ormes Street; Baker Brook NB	47°19′14″N 68°30′54″W	Baker Brook municipality (12506)		Upload Photo
Albert House	25 Canada Road; Edmundston NB	47°21′47″N 68°19′36″W	Edmundston municipality (4967)		Upload Photo
Maxime Albert Complex	2167 Centrale Street; Saint-Hilaire NB	47°17′26″N 68°23′47″W	Saint-Hilaire municipality (12406)		Upload Photo
Atelier RADO	85 Victoria Street; Edmundston NB	47°21′55″N 68°19′17″W	Edmundston municipality (4963)		Upload Photo
Baker Brook Presbytery	3785 Principale Street; Baker Brook NB	47°17′56″N 68°30′59″W	Baker Brook municipality (12395)		Upload Photo
Jesse Baker House	2 Des Ormes Street; Baker Brook NB	47°18′10″N 68°30′38″W	Baker Brook municipality (12422)		Upload Photo
Brunswick Résidence Funéraire	20, rue de l'Eglise; Edmundston NB	47°22′01″N 68°19′30″W	Edmundston municipality (5076)		Upload Photo
Café d'la vieille forge	223 Principale Street; Saint-Jacques, Edmundston NB	47°25′41″N 68°23′05″W	Saint-Jacques, Edmundston municipality (5474)		Upload Photo
Caisse populaire de Saint-François-de-Madawaska	1982, Commerciale Street; Saint-Francois-de-Madawaska NB	47°14′36″N 68°42′01″W	Saint-Francois-de-Madawaska municipality (12466)		Upload Photo
Renaud Campagna Portes et fenêtres	783 St-Francois Street; Edmundston NB	47°21′18″N 68°22′06″W	Edmundston municipality (4982)		Upload Photo
Canadian National Railways Station	194 Saint Francois Street; Edmundston NB	47°21′42″N 68°20′08″W	Federal (15804)		
Canadian Pacific Railways Station	East of Victoria St. and 32nd Ave. Edmundston NB	47°22′02″N 68°19′13″W	Federal (6730)		
Cathedral of the Immaculate Conception	175 Eglise Street; Edmundston NB	47°21′47″N 68°19′58″W	New Brunswick (1271)		More images
City Hall Square Park	5 Court Street; Edmundston NB	47°21′46″N 68°19′39″W	Edmundston municipality (8222)		Upload Photo
Collin Family Home	2396, Centrale Street; Saint-Hilaire NB	47°17′24″N 68°24′45″W	Saint-Hilaire municipality (12484)		Upload Photo
Robert Connors Church	3614 Route 205; Saint-Francois-de-Madawaska NB	47°12′40″N 68°49′21″W	New Brunswick (3195)		Upload Photo
Mgr. W. J. Conway Public Library	33 Irene Street; Edmundston NB	47°21′48″N 68°19′04″W	Edmundston municipality (9547)		Upload Photo
Alexis Cyr House	De la Chapelle Street; Edmundston NB	47°21′22″N 68°13′53″W	Edmundston municipality (8765)		Upload Photo
Dr. Honoré Cyr House	373 Principale Street; Saint-Basile, Edmundston NB	47°21′26″N 68°13′58″W	Saint-Basile, Edmundston municipality (5473)		Upload Photo
René and Lillian Cyr House	137 Principale Street; Sainte-Anne-de-Madawaska NB	47°15′00″N 68°01′54″W	Sainte-Anne-de-Madawaska municipality (8160)		Upload Photo
Oscar Daigle and Sons Farm	3369 Principale Street; Baker Brook NB	47°18′12″N 68°30′25″W	Baker Brook municipality (12425)		Upload Photo
Edmundston Cenotaph	7 Canada Road; Edmundston NB	47°21′46″N 68°19′35″W	Edmundston municipality (8158)		
Edmundston CPR Station	121 Victoria Street; Edmundston NB	47°22′02″N 68°19′17″W	New Brunswick (2852)		
Emmerson House	1 Canada Road; Edmundston NB	47°21′46″N 68°19′31″W	Edmundston municipality (8767)		Upload Photo
Épicerie R. H. Clavette	74 Principale Street; Rivière-Verte NB	47°19′06″N 68°08′41″W	Rivière-Verte municipality (12523)		Upload Photo
Épicerie Le Roi du Bœuf	3736 Principale Street; Baker Brook NB	47°18′00″N 68°30′47″W	Baker Brook municipality (12394)		Upload Photo
Former Mont Saint-Joseph Convent	8 Saint-Joseph Street; Sainte-Anne-de-Madawaska NB	47°14′48″N 68°01′35″W	Sainte-Anne-de-Madawaska municipality (8157)		Upload Photo
Former J. Frank Rice Store	54 Canada Road; Edmundston NB	47°21′47″N 68°19′42″W	Edmundston municipality (9545)		Upload Photo
Former L. H. Morneault Cie Ltée Hardware Store	24 St-Francois Street; Edmundston NB	47°21′45″N 68°19′35″W	Edmundston municipality (10395)		Upload Photo
Former York Hotel	181 St-Francois Street; Edmundston NB	47°21′43″N 68°20′03″W	Edmundston municipality (5901)		Upload Photo
Fraser Edmundston Golf Club	570 Victoria Street; Edmundston NB	47°22′46″N 68°20′22″W	Edmundston municipality (9469)		Upload Photo
Garderie Mont Ste-Marie	641 St-Francois Street; Edmundston NB	47°21′33″N 68°21′39″W	Edmundston municipality (10386)		Upload Photo
Government of Canada Building	22 Emerson Street; Edmundston NB	47°21′50″N 68°19′33″W	Federal (13087)		Upload Photo
L'Hôtel-Dieu Saint-Joseph	429 Principale Street; Edmundston NB	47°21′30″N 68°14′10″W	New Brunswick (2351)		
Hutman's Store	45 Canada Road; Edmundston NB	47°21′49″N 68°19′40″W	Edmundston municipality (5985)		Upload Photo
Journal Le Madawaska Building	20 St-Francois Street; Edmundston NB	47°21′45″N 68°19′33″W	Edmundston municipality (9900)		Upload Photo
Lac Baker Grotto	5544 Centrale Street; Lac-Baker NB	47°20′03″N 68°38′30″W	Lac-Baker municipality (12482)		Upload Photo
Rodolphe Lajoie House	23 Principale Street; Sainte-Anne-de-Madawaska NB	47°14′33″N 68°01′08″W	Sainte-Anne-de-Madawaska municipality (8159)		Upload Photo
Lancaster KB822 Aircraft	17439 Trans-Canada Highway Route 2 Edmundston NB	47°29′09″N 68°28′42″W	Edmundston municipality (8726)		More images
Madawaska Dam and Hydroelectric Generating Station	5 Ferry Avenue; Edmundston NB	47°21′46″N 68°19′28″W	Edmundston municipality (10359)		Upload Photo
Madawaska Regional Exhibition Building	275 Principale Street; Saint-Basile, Edmundston NB	47°21′24″N 68°13′43″W	Saint-Basile, Edmundston municipality (10391)		Upload Photo
Maison des filles de Marie de l'Assomption	25 22nd Street; Edmundston NB	47°22′33″N 68°19′15″W	Edmundston municipality (5495)		Upload Photo
Le Manoir des Lacs Inn	20 De la Pointe Street; Lac-Baker NB	47°20′09″N 68°38′29″W	Lac-Baker municipality (12481)		Upload Photo
Élizabeth Martin Building	4 De l'Eglise Street; Sainte-Anne-de-Madawaska NB	47°14′55″N 68°01′47″W	Sainte-Anne-de-Madawaska municipality (8368)		Upload Photo
Jos B. Michaud Blacksmith Shop	2056 Commerciale Street; Saint-Francois-de-Madawaska NB	47°14′36″N 68°42′19″W	Saint-Francois-de-Madawaska municipality (12504)		Upload Photo
Mont Farlagne	360 Mont-Farlagne Road; Edmundston NB	47°24′44″N 68°22′53″W	Edmundston municipality (10374)		More images
Office of Lawyer Jean Cyr	10 Emmerson Street; Edmundston NB	47°21′49″N 68°19′35″W	Edmundston municipality (5465)		Upload Photo
Old Saint-Jacques Church Bell Monument	6, rue de l'Ecole; Saint-Jacques, Edmundston NB	47°25′45″N 68°23′09″W	Saint-Jacques, Edmundston municipality (4993)		Upload Photo
Claude Picard Fresco: "La vie au Madawaska 1785-1985"	7 Canada Road; Edmundston NB	47°21′48″N 68°19′34″W	Edmundston municipality (9546)		Upload Photo
P'tit Sault Blockhouse	10 St-Jean Avenue; Edmundston NB	47°21′48″N 68°19′22″W	New Brunswick (2156)		More images
Praga Hotel	127 Rue Victoria; Edmundston NB	47°22′03″N 68°19′19″W	Edmundston municipality (5899)		Upload Photo
97 Rice Street	97 Rice Street; Edmundston NB	47°21′53″N 68°19′52″W	Edmundston municipality (8771)		Upload Photo
101 Rice Street	101 Rice Street; Edmundston NB	47°21′53″N 68°19′52″W	Edmundston municipality (8772)		Upload Photo
Sacré-Cœur-de-Jésus Church	35 Principale Street; Rivière-Verte NB	47°18′53″N 68°08′30″W	Rivière-Verte municipality (12524)		Upload Photo
Saint-Basile Cemetery	Rue Principale; Saint-Basile, Edmundston NB	47°21′21″N 68°13′52″W	Saint-Basile, Edmundston municipality (5970)		Upload Photo
Saint-Basile Church	321, rue Principale; Saint-Basile, Edmundston NB	47°21′24″N 68°13′50″W	Saint-Basile, Edmundston municipality (6609)		Upload Photo
Saint-Cœur-de-Marie Church	3771 Principale Street; Baker Brook NB	47°17′57″N 68°30′54″W	Baker Brook municipality (12424)		More images
Sainte-Anne-de-Madawaska Church	101 Principal Street; Sainte-Anne-de-Madawaska NB	47°14′51″N 68°01′43″W	Sainte-Anne-de-Madawaska municipality (8095)		Upload Photo
Saint-François-d'Assise Church	678 Principale Street; Clair NB	47°15′18″N 68°36′07″W	Clair municipality (12465)		Upload Photo
Saint-François-de-Madawaska Church	2019 Commerciale Street; Saint-Francois-de-Madawaska NB	47°14′36″N 68°42′11″W	Saint-Francois-de-Madawaska municipality (12505)		Upload Photo
Saint-François-de-Madawaska Religious and Institutional Site	20 Mgr Lang Street; Saint-Francois-de-Madawaska NB	47°14′31″N 68°42′10″W	Saint-Francois-de-Madawaska municipality (12502)		Upload Photo
Saint-Hilaire Church	2208 Centrale Street; Saint-Hilaire NB	47°17′26″N 68°23′58″W	Saint-Hilaire municipality (12407)		
Saint-Hilaire Presbytery	2200 Centrale Street; Saint-Hilaire NB	47°17′25″N 68°23′56″W	Saint-Hilaire municipality (12408)		Upload Photo
Saint-Jacques Sluice	Victoria Street; Edmundston NB	47°24′59″N 68°22′31″W	Edmundston municipality (10342)		Upload Photo
Saint John the Baptist Anglican Church	corner of Church and Costigan Streets; Edmundston NB	47°21′52″N 68°19′40″W	New Brunswick (2661)		
Saint Paul's United Church	82 Canada Road; Edmundston NB	47°21′51″N 68°19′48″W	New Brunswick (5877)		Upload Photo
Saint-Thomas-d'Aquin Church	45 De l'Eglise Road; Lac-Baker NB	47°20′11″N 68°38′26″W	Lac-Baker municipality (12483)		
Simon-Larouche Pavilion	165 Hebert Boulevard; Edmundston NB	47°22′17″N 68°18′52″W	Edmundston municipality (5321)		More images
Smyth House	81 Principale Street; Riviere-Verte NB	47°19′07″N 68°08′42″W	Riviere-Verte municipality (12501)		Upload Photo
Soucy Farm	683 Principale St. Saint-Basile, Edmundston NB	47°21′39″N 68°14′52″W	Saint-Basile, Edmundston municipality (5320)		Upload Photo
Spilly's Resto-Bar	22 Hill Street; Edmundston NB	47°21′46″N 68°19′45″W	Edmundston municipality (10600)		Upload Photo
Wolastoq National Historic Site of Canada	Entire watershed of Saint John River central and western New Brunswick, parts of southeastern Quebec NB	47°17′59″N 68°30′34″W	Federal (18954)		More images

== See also ==
- List of historic places in New Brunswick
- List of National Historic Sites of Canada in New Brunswick
