= Wellington Parish, New Brunswick =

Wellington
- Parish
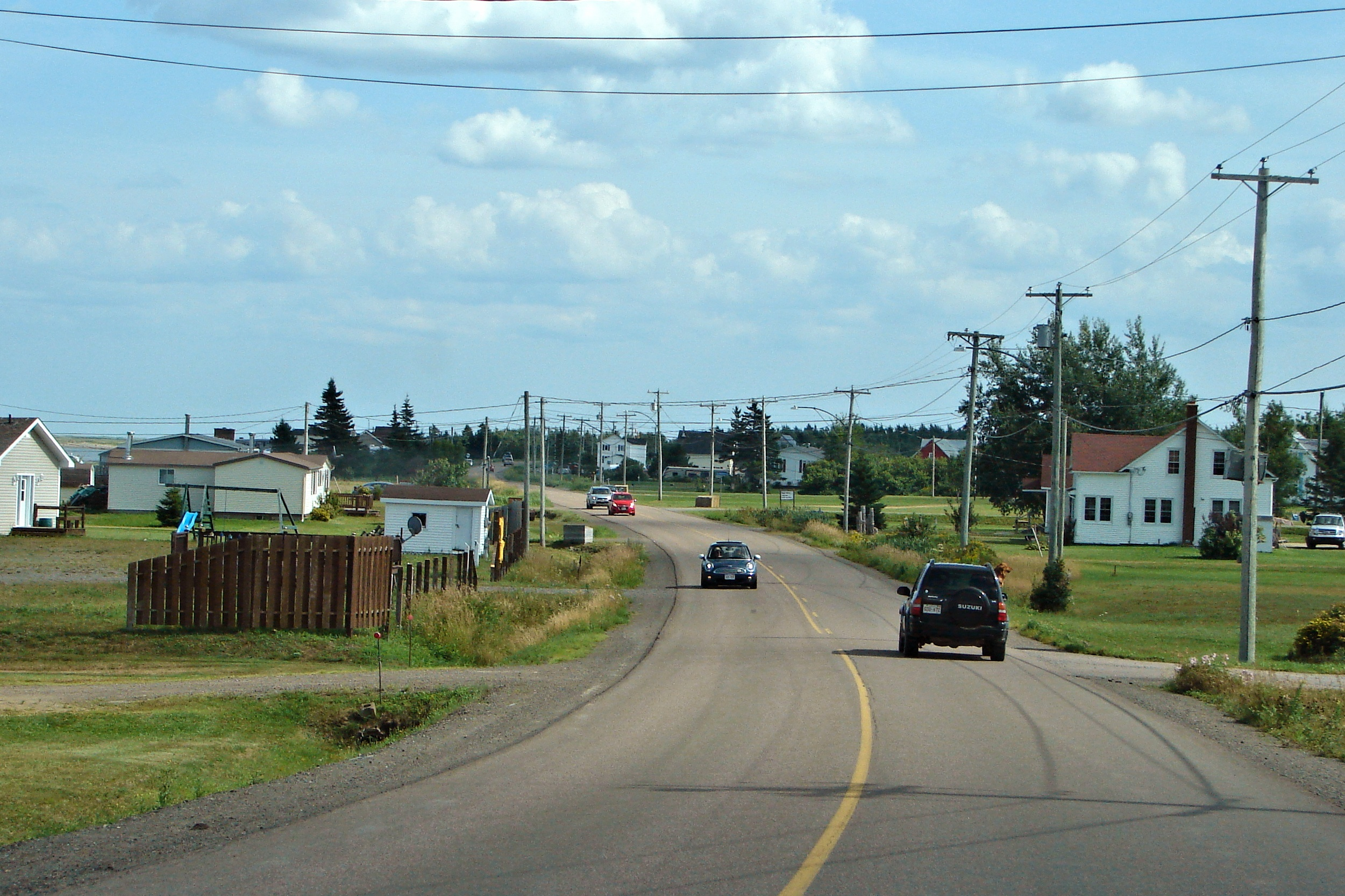
- Saint-Édouard-de-Kent

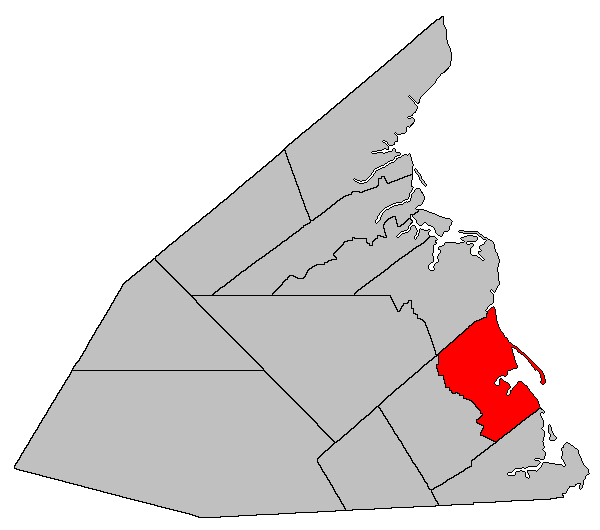
- Location within Kent County, New Brunswick.
- Coordinates: 46.525°N 64.745°W
- Country: Canada
- Province: New Brunswick
- County: Kent County
- Erected: 1814

Area
  - Land: 184.80 km^{2} (71.35 sq mi)

Population (2021)
  - Total: 3,292
  - Density: 17.8/km^{2} (46/sq mi)
  - Change 2016-2021: ▲6.9%
  - Dwellings: 1,747
- Time zone: UTC-4 (AST)
  - Summer (DST): UTC-3 (ADT)
- Figures do not include portion within the town of Bouctouche, the Buctouche 16 Indian reserve, and the rural community of Cocagne

Wellington is a geographic parish in Kent County, New Brunswick, Canada. (Note: The Territorial Division Act divides the province into 152 parishes, the cities of Saint John and Fredericton, and one town of Grand Falls. The Interpretation Act clarifies that parishes include any local government within their borders.)

For governance purposes it is divided between the towns of Champdoré and Grand-Bouctouche, the village of Five Rivers, (Note: Maps still visible as thumbnails show the current and previous governance boundaries.) and the incorporated rural community of Beausoleil, all of which are members of the Kent Regional Service Commission, and the Buctouche 16 Indian reserve, which is not.

Prior to the 2023 governance reform, the parish was divided between the town of Bouctouche, the Indian reserve, the incorporated rural community of Cocagne, and the local service districts of Grand Saint-Antoine, Sainte-Anne-de-Kent and the parish of Wellington, which included areas with enhanced services named Bouctouche Cove, Desroches, Dixon Point-Route 134, Wellington - Dixon Point-Route 134, and Saint-Grégoire. Bouctouche and Sainte-Anne-de-Kent became part of Grand-Bouctouche, Grand Saint-Antoine part of Champdoré, Cocagne part of Beaulsoleil, and the LSD of the parish of Wellington was split between all four new municipalities.

== Origin of name ==
The parish was named for the Marquess of Wellington, (Note: Wellington was raised to Duke two months after the parish was erected.) British commander in the Peninsular War.

== History ==
Wellington was erected in 1814 as part of Northumberland County from Newcastle Parish. It included modern Dundas and Sainte-Marie Parishes plus most of Saint-Paul Parish.

In 1827 Dundas was erected as its own parish, with the Mahalawodiac River forming the boundary between the two.

In 1828 the boundary with Dundas was altered, moved south to run along grant lines south of Després Road in the east and then straight west.

In 1862 the boundary with Dundas was altered to its modern course.

In 1867 Sainte-Marie was erected from the western part of Wellington, including modern Saint-Paul.

In 1871 the Renauds Mills area was returned from Sainte-Marie.

== Boundaries ==
Wellington Parish is bounded:

- on the north by the Chockpish River upstream as far as the mouth of the Rivière Chockpish-nord, then south 68º west (Note: By the magnet of 1850, when declination in the area was between 21º and 22º west of north.) to the Sainte-Marie Parish line slightly east of East Branch Road;
- on the east by the Northumberland Strait;
- on the southeast by a line beginning on the shore of Northumberland Strait near Bar-de-Cocagne, then running south 72º 30' west (Note: By the magnet of 1862, when declination in the area was between 21º and 22º west of north.) past Goudalie Road and crossing Renauds Mills Road twice before meeting the Sainte-Marie Parish line east of Saint-Antoine;
- on the west by a line beginning south of Renauds Mills Road, east of Saint-Antoine, then northwesterly straight along grant lines to the Little Buctouche River, then downriver past the prolongation of Chemin Yvon-à-Fred, then northwesterly along to the rear line of a tier of grants straddling Kay Road and across a Crown reserved road that continues Chemin Alban-Légère, then northeasterly along the northwestern side of the Crown reserved road to the eastern line of a grant that runs along part of Dunlop Road, then northwesterly along the grant line to the Buctouche River, then across the river and up Mill Creek to a grant line on the prolongation of Deep Gully Road, then northwesterly along the grant line to Girouardville Road, then southwesterly along Girouardville Road to the southernmost corner of a grant at the corner of Girouardville Road and Mill Creek Road, then northwesterly along the western line of the grant and its prolongation to Mill Creek, then upstream to the eastern line of a grant on the eastern side of Black River Road, then northwesterly along the grant line to Saint-Maurice Road, then southwesterly along Saint-Maurice Road to the western line of a small grant opposite the end of Black River Road, then northwesterly along the grant line and its prolongation to the rear line of grants along the Arsenault Settlement Road, then northeasterly to the western line of a grant that includes the junction of East Branch Road and Arsenault Settlement Road, then north to the northern line of the parish;
- including any islands in front of the parish.

== Communities ==
Communities at least partly within the parish. bold indicates an incorporated municipality or Indian reserve

- **Bouctouche**
  - Boisjoli
  - Buctouche-Sud
  - Girouardville
  - Saint-Jean-Baptiste
- **Buctouche 16**
- Caissie-Village
- Chockpish
- **Cocagne**
  - Bar-de-Cocagne
  - Ward Corner
- Collette-Village
- Côte-Sainte-Anne
- Maria-de-Kent
- McKees Mills
- McNairn
- Renauds Mills
- Sainte-Anne-de-Kent
- Saint-David
- Saint-Édouard-de-Kent
- Saint-François-de-Kent
- Saint-Gabriel-de-Kent
- Saint-Grégoire
- Saint-Joseph-de-Kent
- Saint-Maurice
- Saint-Pierre-de-Kent
- Saint-Thomas-de-Kent
- Upper Saint-Maurice
- Village-des-Arsenault
- Village-Sainte-Croix
- Village-Saint-Irénée

== Bodies of water ==
Bodies of water (Note: Not including brooks, ponds or coves.) at least partly within the parish.

- Black River
- Buctouche River
- Chockpish River
- Little Buctouche River
- Mill Creek
- Noel Creek
- Northumberland Strait
- Buctouche Bay
- Buctouche Harbour
- Fond de la Baie

== Other notable places ==
Parks, historic sites, and other noteworthy places at least partly within the parish.

- Bouctouche Aerodrome

== Demographics ==
Parish population total does not include Bouctouche, Buctouche 16, and portion within Cocagne (after 2011)

=== Population ===
Population trend

Census	Population	Change (%)
2016	3,079	▼0.6%
2011 revised	3,099	–
2011	3,327	▼4.5%
2006	3,484	▲1.3%
2001	3,440	▼4.3%
1996	3,595	▼1.7%
1991	3,657	N/A

=== Language ===
Mother tongue (2016)

Language	Population	Pct (%)
French only	2,530	82.3%
English only	465	15.1%
Other languages	35	1.1%
Both English and French	45	1.5%

== See also ==
- List of parishes in New Brunswick
