= Sainte-Marie Parish =

Saint-Marie Saint Mary, St. Mary, Ste. Marie
- Parish
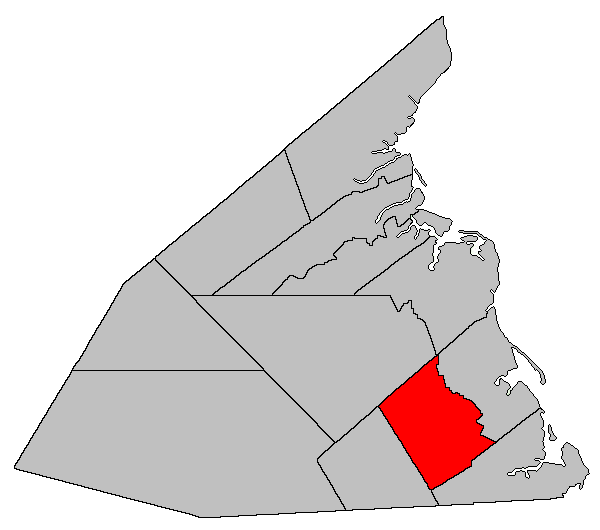
- Location within Kent County, New Brunswick.
- Coordinates: 46.39°N 64.8725°W
- Country: Canada
- Province: New Brunswick
- County: Kent
- Erected: 1867

Area
  - Land: 238.32 km^{2} (92.02 sq mi)

Population (2021)
  - Total: 1,991
  - Density: 8.4/km^{2} (22/sq mi)
  - Change 2016-2021: ▲1.0%
  - Dwellings: 956
- Time zone: UTC-4 (AST)
  - Summer (DST): UTC-3 (ADT)
- Figures do not include portion within the village of Saint-Antoine

Saint-Marie (originally Saint Mary), (Note: The official name is Sainte-Marie in both languages although Saint Mary is often used.) is a geographic parish in Kent County, New Brunswick, Canada. (Note: The Territorial Division Act divides the province into 152 parishes, the cities of Saint John and Fredericton, and one town of Grand Falls. The Interpretation Act clarifies that parishes include any local government within their borders.)

For governance purposes, most of the parish belongs to the town of Champdoré, with small areas along its eastern and northern boundaries belonging to the town of Grand-Bouctouche and the village of Five Rivers, respectively; (Note: Maps still visible as thumbnails show the current and previous governance boundaries.) all are members of the Kent Regional Service Commission.

Prior to the 2023 governance reform, the parish was divided between the village of Saint-Antoine and the local service districts of Grand Saint-Antoine and the parish of Saint Mary. (Note: The French name of Saint Mary is officially la paroisse de Sainte-Marie.)

== Origin of name ==
The parish's name may have come from a church.

== History ==
Sainte-Marie was erected as Saint Mary in 1867 from Wellington Parish.

In 1871 the Renauds Mills area of Sainte-Marie was returned to Wellington.

In 1883 Sainte-Marie annexed part of Harcourt Parish east of the railway.

In 1888 Saint-Paul Parish was erected from all of the parish west of McLaughlin Road.

In 1973 the parish's name was legally changed to Sainte-Marie.

== Boundaries ==
Sainte-Marie Parish is bounded:

- on the north by the prolongation of a line running south 68º west (Note: By the magnet of 1850, when declination in the area was between 21º and 22º west of north.) from the mouth of the Rivière Chockpish-nord to Route 490;
- on the east by a line beginning south of Renauds Mills Road, east of Saint-Antoine, then northwesterly straight along grant lines to the Little Buctouche River, then downriver past the prolongation of Chemin Yvon-à-Fred, then northwesterly along to the rear line of a tier of grants straddling Kay Road and across a Crown reserved road that continues Chemin Alban-Légère, then northeasterly along the northwestern side of the Crown reserved road to the eastern line of a grant that runs along part of Dunlop Road, then northwesterly along the grant line to the Buctouche River, then across the river and up Mill Creek to a grant line on the prolongation of Deep Gully Road, then northwesterly along the grant line to Girouardville Road, then southwesterly along Girouardville Road to the southernmost corner of a grant at the corner of Girouardville Road and Mill Creek Road, then northwesterly along the western line of the grant and its prolongation to Mill Creek, then upstream to the eastern line of a grant on the eastern side of Black River Road, then northwesterly along the grant line to Saint-Maurice Road, then southwesterly along Saint-Maurice Road to the western line of a small grant opposite the end of Black River Road, then northwesterly along the grant line and its prolongation to the rear line of grants along the Arsenault Settlement Road, then northeasterly to the western line of a grant that includes the junction of East Branch Road and Arsenault Settlement Road, then north to the northern line of the parish;
- on the south by a line beginning on the shore of Northumberland Strait near Bar-de-Cocagne, then running south 72º 30' west (Note: By the magnet of 1862, when declination in the area was between 21º and 22º west of north.) to the western line of a grant on the western side of the junction of Gérard Road and Robichaud Cross Road, a bit north of Robichaud Cross Road, then southwesterly along the grant line to the northwestern line of a grant straddling Gérard Road, part of a tier of grants on the northwestern side of Alexandrina Road, then southwesterly along the rear line of the tier and its prolongation to Route 490;
- on the west by Route 490.

== Communities ==
Communities at least partly within the parish; bold indicates an incorporated municipality; italics indicate a name no longer in official use

- Bastarache
- Champdoré
- Coates Mills
- Haut-Saint-Antoine
- Kent Boom
- McNairn
- Murphy Settlement
- Pelerin
- Roy
- **Saint-Antoine**
- Saint-Cyrille
- Saint-Damien
- Saint-Fabien
- Saint-Lazare
- Sainte-Marie-de-Kent
- South Saint-Norbert
- Upper Buctouche

== Bodies of water ==
Bodies of water (Note: Not including brooks, ponds or coves.) at least partly in the parish:

- Buctouche River
- Little Buctouche River
- Mill Creek

== Demographics ==
Parish population total does not include the village of Saint-Antoine

=== Population ===
**Population trend**

Census	Population	Change (%)
2016	1,972	▼1.8%
2006	2,008	▲1.0%
2006	1,989	▼1.7%
2001	2,024	▼8.3%
1996	2,208	▲2.5%
1991	2,154	N/A

=== Language ===
**Mother tongue (2016)**

Language	Population	Pct (%)
French only	1,605	81.5%
English only	320	16.2%
Other languages	30	1.5%
Both English and French	15	0.8%

== See also ==
- List of parishes in New Brunswick
