= List of historic places in Albert County, New Brunswick =

This article is a list of historic places in Albert County, New Brunswick entered on the Canadian Register of Historic Places, whether they are federal, provincial, or municipal.

== List of historic places ==
Name	Address	Coordinates	Government recognition (CRHP №)	Wikidata ID	Image
Acadien Battle Field	2861 Main Street; Hillsborough NB	45°55′21″N 64°38′41″W	Hillsborough municipality (18123)	Q139799905	Upload Photo
Administration Building	2861 Main Street; Fundy National Park NB	45°35′44″N 64°57′03″W	Federal (10096)	Q55206261	More images
Albert Manufacturing Co. Office	2849 Main Street; Hillsborough NB	45°55′23″N 64°38′43″W	Hillsborough municipality (18370)	Q139799928	Upload Photo
Albert Mines Site	Old Albert Mines Road; Albert Mines NB	45°53′07″N 64°41′23″W	New Brunswick (9423)	Q139799959	Upload Photo
Coverdale United Church	1174 Coverdale Road; Riverview NB	46°02′45″N 64°51′55″W	New Brunswick (5734)	Q112586735	Upload Photo
Willy Duffy House	3 Duffy Lane; Hillsborough NB	45°55′36″N 64°38′56″W	Hillsborough municipality (16405)	Q139804435	Upload Photo
Richard A. Gross House	2834 Main Street; Hillsborough NB	45°55′29″N 64°38′50″W	Hillsborough municipality (18371)	Q139804546	Upload Photo
Hillsborough Fashions	2803 Main Street; Hillsborough NB	45°55′36″N 64°38′52″W	Hillsborough municipality (18181)	Q139804552	Upload Photo
Hillsborough Pioneer Cemetery	2807a Main Street; Hillsborough NB	45°55′33″N 64°38′50″W	Hillsborough municipality (18167)	Q139804600	Upload Photo
Hillsborough United Church	2891 Main Street; Hillsborough NB	45°55′10″N 64°38′37″W	Hillsborough municipality (16524)	Q139804859	Upload Photo
Captain William Irving House	2792 Main Street; Hillsborough NB	45°55′40″N 64°38′58″W	Hillsborough municipality (16343)	Q139805401	Upload Photo
Dr. Jump House	2826 Main Street; Hillsborough NB	45°55′31″N 64°38′55″W	Hillsborough municipality (18164)	Q139807878	Upload Photo
Honourable John Lewis House	2889 Main Street; Hillsborough NB	45°55′11″N 64°38′36″W	Hillsborough municipality (17561)	Q139807884	Upload Photo
New Brunswick Railway Museum	2847 Main Street; Hillsborough NB	45°55′23″N 64°38′45″W	Hillsborough municipality (18394)	Q2962346	More images
Old Hillsborough Post Office	2852 Main Street; Hillsborough NB	45°55′24″N 64°38′46″W	Hillsborough municipality (16381)	Q139807942	Upload Photo
Peck Memorial Hall	2820 Main Street; Hillsborough NB	45°55′33″N 64°38′52″W	Hillsborough municipality (16501)	Q139807973	Upload Photo
Allison Peck House	2832 Main Street; Hillsborough NB	45°55′29″N 64°38′50″W	Hillsborough municipality (18369)	Q139807979	Upload Photo
John Peck House	15 Pleasant Street; Hillsborough NB	45°55′30″N 64°38′54″W	Hillsborough municipality (18166)	Q139807992	Upload Photo
Riverside Consolidated School	90 Water Street; Riverside-Albert NB	45°44′53″N 64°43′53″W	New Brunswick (2207)	Q130540513	More images
Rose Arbor	2835 Main Street; Hillsborough NB	45°55′27″N 64°38′46″W	Hillsborough municipality (16357)	Q139808001	Upload Photo
Saint Mary's Anglican Church	39 Mill Street; Hillsborough NB	45°55′29″N 64°38′39″W	Hillsborough municipality (16641)	Q139597124	More images
Saltwater Pool and Bathhouse	51 Point Wolfe Road; Alma NB	45°35′26″N 64°57′10″W	Federal (13090)	Q55206247	Upload Photo
Steeves House	40 Mill Street; Hillsborough NB	45°55′31″N 64°38′38″W	New Brunswick (13983)	Q139597091	More images
Christian Steeves House	45 Pleasant Street; Hillsborough NB	45°55′27″N 64°39′00″W	Hillsborough municipality (16382)	Q139808215	Upload Photo
Jordan Steeves Business Block	2848 Main Street; Hillsborough NB	45°55′25″N 64°38′47″W	Hillsborough municipality (16354)	Q139808406	Upload Photo
Jordan Steeves House	2838 Main Street; Hillsborough NB	45°55′28″N 64°38′48″W	Hillsborough municipality (16345)	Q139808705	Upload Photo
Richard Steeves House	2812 Main Street; Hillsborough NB	45°55′34″N 64°38′54″W	Hillsborough municipality (18161)	Q139808897	Upload Photo
Taylor Estate	23 Taylor Lane; Hillsborough NB	45°54′48″N 64°38′29″W	Hillsborough municipality (16404)	Q139809423	Upload Photo
Valley Baptist Church	3039 Main Street; Hillsborough NB	45°54′31″N 64°38′07″W	Hillsborough municipality (16394)	Q139809621	Upload Photo
Victoria Manor	Maple Street; Riverside-Albert NB	45°45′10″N 64°43′32″W	New Brunswick (3205)	Q139810058	Upload Photo
Victoriana Steeves Homestead Bed and Breakfast	57 Pleasant Street; Hillsborough NB	45°55′26″N 64°39′01″W	Hillsborough municipality (16504)	Q139810253	Upload Photo
Wallace Farm	2908 Main Street; Hillsborough NB	45°55′07″N 64°38′37″W	Hillsborough municipality (16161)	Q139810483	Upload Photo
Wolastoq National Historic Site of Canada	Entire watershed of Saint John River central and western New Brunswick, parts of southeastern Quebec NB	45°49′35″N 65°12′17″W	Federal (18954)	Q18402136	More images
Captain Wood House	2819 Main Street; Hillsborough NB	45°55′31″N 64°38′49″W	Hillsborough municipality (18372)	Q139810656	Upload Photo

== See also ==
- List of historic places in New Brunswick
- List of National Historic Sites of Canada in New Brunswick
