= List of historic places in Restigouche County, New Brunswick =

This is a list of historic places in Restigouche County, New Brunswick entered on the Canadian Register of Historic Places, whether they are federal, provincial, or municipal.

== List of historic places ==
Name	Address	Coordinates	Government recognition (CRHP №)	Wikidata ID	Image
126 Brunswick Street	126 Brunswick Street; Dalhousie NB	48°03′51″N 66°22′22″W	Dalhousie municipality (7089)		Upload Photo
Convent	10 Place de l'Eglise; Saint-Quentin NB	47°30′39″N 67°23′29″W	Saint-Quentin municipality (3126)		Upload Photo
Dalhousie Town Hall	117 Hall Street; Dalhousie NB	48°03′58″N 66°22′31″W	New Brunswick (1646)		Upload Photo
Direct Relief Store	158 Canada Street; Saint-Quentin NB	47°30′30″N 67°23′31″W	Saint-Quentin municipality (6655)		Upload Photo
Mrs. Trèfflé Dubé Store	201 Canada Street; Saint-Quentin NB	47°30′41″N 67°23′33″W	Saint-Quentin municipality (3434)		Upload Photo
First Co-op Store	8 Patrick Jean Street; Saint-Quentin NB	47°30′31″N 67°24′04″W	Saint-Quentin municipality (3485)		Upload Photo
Former Kedgwick Railway Station	2A Jeanne d'Arc Road; Kedgwick NB	47°38′36″N 67°20′58″W	New Brunswick (2428)		Upload Photo
The Fountain	188 Canada Street; Saint-Quentin NB	47°30′37″N 67°23′30″W	Saint-Quentin municipality (2962)		
131 George Street	131 George Street; Dalhousie NB	48°03′52″N 66°22′49″W	Dalhousie municipality (7129)		Upload Photo
Glenwood Provincial Park	Route 17; Eldon NB	47°51′06″N 67°00′21″W	New Brunswick (6405)		Upload Photo
La Grande École	182 Canada Street; Saint-Quentin NB	47°30′36″N 67°23′30″W	Saint-Quentin municipality (2965)		Upload Photo
Hamilton Monument	Corner of Hall and Adelaide Streets; Dalhousie NB	48°03′55″N 66°22′34″W	Dalhousie municipality (7086)		Upload Photo
Inch Arran Park	Inch Arran Avenue; Dalhousie NB	48°03′36″N 66°21′10″W	Dalhousie municipality (7124)		Upload Photo
Louis A. Lebel House	213 Canada Street; Saint-Quentin NB	47°30′44″N 67°23′33″W	Saint-Quentin municipality (6662)		Upload Photo
Lynch-Chouinard House	231 Mgr. Martin Road East; Saint-Quentin NB	47°30′47″N 67°22′54″W	Saint-Quentin municipality (3437)		Upload Photo
Patrick Jean Store	162 Canada Street; Saint-Quentin NB	47°30′32″N 67°23′33″W	Saint-Quentin municipality (6664)		Upload Photo
MacLean Residence	442 Adelaide Street; Dalhousie NB	48°03′55″N 66°22′49″W	Dalhousie municipality (7733)		Upload Photo
Martel Dairy Farm	282 Canada Street; Saint-Quentin NB	47°31′03″N 67°23′28″W	Saint-Quentin municipality (2960)		Upload Photo
Miller Farm	456 Sunset Drive; Dalhousie NB	48°02′28″N 66°24′48″W	Dalhousie municipality (7233)		Upload Photo
Old Royal Bank Building	420 William Street; Dalhousie NB	48°03′59″N 66°22′31″W	Dalhousie municipality (18122)		Upload Photo
Railway Station Warehouses	Near the reconstructed railway station on Canada Street; Saint-Quentin NB	47°30′28″N 67°23′28″W	Saint-Quentin municipality (3133)		Upload Photo
J. B. Rioux Building	234 Canada Street; Saint-Quentin NB	47°30′50″N 67°23′31″W	Saint-Quentin municipality (3131)		Upload Photo
Riverview Cemetery	south of 107 Renfrew Street; Dalhousie NB	48°03′55″N 66°22′07″W	Dalhousie municipality (7085)		Upload Photo
Rotary Memorial Park	Bounded by the Courthouse and Jail, and William, Court and Hall Streets; Dalhousie NB	48°03′58″N 66°22′33″W	Dalhousie municipality (7232)		Upload Photo
Léopold Roy House	212 Canada St. Saint-Quentin NB	47°30′44″N 67°23′30″W	Saint-Quentin municipality (5335)		Upload Photo
Saint-Jean-Baptiste Church	336 Church Lane; Dalhousie NB	48°03′47″N 66°22′01″W	Dalhousie municipality (7234)		Upload Photo
St. John's United Church	135 Brunswick Street; Dalhousie NB	48°03′53″N 66°22′18″W	Dalhousie municipality (7130)		Upload Photo
St. Mary's Anglican Church	115 Hall Street; Dalhousie NB	48°03′55″N 66°22′32″W	Dalhousie municipality (7084)		Upload Photo
Bert Somers House	11 Champlain Street; Saint-Quentin NB	47°30′32″N 67°23′26″W	Saint-Quentin municipality (6653)		Upload Photo
Steeple Rooster	188 Canada Street; Saint-Quentin NB	47°30′39″N 67°23′30″W	Saint-Quentin municipality (6648)		More images
Reid Stewart Home	104 Farm Lane; Dalhousie NB	48°03′29″N 66°21′33″W	Dalhousie municipality (7256)		Upload Photo
Inch Arran Point Front Range Lighthouse	Inch Arran Point; Dalhousie NB	48°03′39″N 66°21′06″W	Federal (9684, (21094)		More images
Très Saint-Sacrement de Saint-Quentin Parish Rectory	188 rue Canada; Saint-Quentin NB	47°30′38″N 67°23′30″W	Saint-Quentin municipality (6665)		More images
Wolastoq National Historic Site of Canada	Entire watershed of Saint John River central and western New Brunswick, parts of southeastern Quebec NB	47°25′38″N 66°54′05″W	Federal (18954)		More images

== See also ==
- List of historic places in New Brunswick
- List of National Historic Sites of Canada in New Brunswick
