= List of historic places in Victoria County, New Brunswick =

This is a list of historic places in Victoria County, New Brunswick entered on the Canadian Register of Historic Places, whether they are federal, provincial, or municipal.

== List of historic places ==
Name	Address	Coordinates	Government recognition (CRHP №)	Wikidata ID	Image
All Saints Anglican Church	253 Front Street; Grand Falls NB	47°02′54″N 67°44′29″W	Grand Falls municipality (9681)		Upload Photo
Assomption Cemetery	Chapel Street; Grand Falls NB	47°02′38″N 67°44′31″W	Grand Falls municipality (9630)		Upload Photo
Assomption Cemetery (Portage Road)	368 Portage Road; Grand Falls NB	47°02′02″N 67°44′53″W	Grand Falls municipality (9680)		Upload Photo
Assomption Church	355 Chapel Street; Grand Falls NB	47°02′39″N 67°44′29″W	Grand Falls municipality (9605)		Upload Photo
The Broadway	246 Broadway Boulevard; Grand Falls NB	47°02′52″N 67°44′27″W	Grand Falls municipality (9689)		Upload Photo
Canadian Pacific Railway Station	Station Street; Aroostook NB	46°48′23″N 67°43′15″W	Federal (4523)		
Former Canadian Pacific Railway Station	Portage Street; Grand Falls NB	47°02′36″N 67°44′41″W	Federal (9980)		
Herby (Bert) Corbin Monument	Broadway Boulevard; Grand Falls NB	47°02′44″N 67°44′39″W	Grand Falls municipality (9617)		Upload Photo
Danish Immigrant Lot	6 Main Street; New Denmark NB	46°57′29″N 67°38′59″W	New Brunswick (5762)		Upload Photo
Farmers' Market	68 Madawaska Road; Grand Falls NB	47°03′13″N 67°44′15″W	Grand Falls municipality (9608)		Upload Photo
Former National Transcontinental Railway (Canadian National Railways) Station	CN Road (at Industrial), Grand Falls, Canada; Grand Falls NB	47°03′50″N 67°44′31″W	Federal (4589)		Upload Photo
Former St. James United Church	1291 West Riverside Drive; Southern Victoria NB	46°45′03″N 67°41′48″W	New Brunswick (5875)		Upload Photo
Fort Carleton Commemorative Site	Broadway Boulevard; Grand Falls NB	47°02′49″N 67°44′31″W	Grand Falls municipality (9627)		Upload Photo
Government of Canada Building	373 Broadway Boulevard; Grand Falls NB	47°02′42″N 67°44′35″W	Grand Falls municipality (2000)		Upload Photo
Kirkpatrick House	131 Church Street; Grand Falls NB	47°02′48″N 67°44′20″W	Grand Falls municipality (9631)		Upload Photo
Krupp Cannon	Broadway Boulevard; Grand Falls NB	47°02′55″N 67°44′20″W	Grand Falls municipality (9609)		Upload Photo
Malabeam Centre	61 Madawaska Road; Grand Falls NB	47°03′08″N 67°44′18″W	Grand Falls municipality (9607)		Upload Photo
Masonic Hall	136 Church Street; Grand Falls NB	47°02′49″N 67°44′20″W	Grand Falls municipality (8239)		Upload Photo
Old Grand Falls Post Office	142 Court Street; Grand Falls NB	47°02′47″N 67°44′26″W	Grand Falls municipality (6489)		Upload Photo
Pine Hill Cemetery	Broadway Boulevard; Grand Falls NB	47°02′37″N 67°44′57″W	Grand Falls municipality (9687)		Upload Photo
St. Andrew's United Church	122 Church Street; Grand Falls NB	47°02′48″N 67°44′17″W	Grand Falls municipality (9613)		Upload Photo
Sénéchal Store	304 Broadway Boulevard; Grand Falls NB	47°02′50″N 67°44′32″W	Grand Falls municipality (9629)		Upload Photo
Sons of Martha Monument	O. B. Davis Park; Grand Falls NB	47°03′02″N 67°44′21″W	Grand Falls municipality (9610)		Upload Photo
Union Cemetery	149 Manse Street; Grand Falls NB	47°02′44″N 67°44′03″W	Grand Falls municipality (9688)		Upload Photo
United Baptist Church	96 Court Street; Grand Falls NB	47°02′43″N 67°44′23″W	Grand Falls municipality (9686)		Upload Photo
Victoria County Court House	1135 West Riverside Drive; Southern Victoria NB	46°44′22″N 67°42′17″W	New Brunswick (2858)		More images
Victoria County Registry Office	1131 West Riverside Drive; Southern Victoria NB	46°44′21″N 67°42′17″W	New Brunswick (1955)		
Wolastoq National Historic Site of Canada	Entire watershed of Saint John River central and western New Brunswick, parts of southeastern Quebec NB	46°48′26″N 67°43′01″W	Federal (18954)		More images

== See also ==
- List of historic places in New Brunswick
- List of National Historic Sites of Canada in New Brunswick
