= List of historic places in Kings County, New Brunswick =

This article is a list of historic places in Kings County, New Brunswick entered on the Canadian Register of Historic Places, whether they are federal, provincial, or municipal.

== List of historic places ==
Name	Address	Coordinates	Government recognition (CRHP №)	Wikidata ID	Image
Alwington Manor	15 Station Road; Grand Bay-Westfield NB	45°20′52″N 66°13′26″W	Grand Bay-Westfield municipality (19338)		Upload Photo
Anglican Church of the Resurrection	20 MacDonald Avenue; Grand Bay-Westfield NB	45°18′26″N 66°11′48″W	Grand Bay-Westfield municipality (19332)		Upload Photo
Arnold House	811 Main Street; Sussex NB	45°43′16″N 65°30′04″W	Sussex municipality (10327)		Upload Photo
Belleview Hotel	15 Station Road; Rothesay NB	45°23′21″N 65°59′55″W	Rothesay municipality (6977)		Upload Photo
Black Loyalist Land Grants	Douglas Street; Grand Bay-Westfield NB	45°21′17″N 66°14′48″W	Grand Bay-Westfield municipality (19312)		Upload Photo
Black-Palmer Residence	65 Church Avenue; Sussex NB	45°43′16″N 65°30′38″W	Sussex municipality (10322)		Upload Photo
Brenan House	3189 Rothesay Road; Rothesay NB	45°23′09″N 65°59′51″W	Rothesay municipality (7083)		Upload Photo
9 Brittain Road	9 Brittain Road; Grand Bay-Westfield NB	45°23′49″N 66°17′30″W	Grand Bay-Westfield municipality (18368)		Upload Photo
Brock House	10 Maiden Lane; Rothesay NB	45°23′07″N 65°59′42″W	Rothesay municipality (10260)		Upload Photo
Brooks Residence	148 Maple Avenue; Sussex NB	45°43′35″N 65°30′15″W	Sussex municipality (8706)		Upload Photo
Church Avenue Fountain	135 Church Avenue; Sussex NB	45°43′08″N 65°30′37″W	Sussex municipality (8697)		Upload Photo
8 Church Avenue	8 Church Avenue; Rothesay NB	45°23′23″N 65°59′44″W	Rothesay municipality (7049)		Upload Photo
Cleasby	4 Allison Drive; Rothesay NB	45°22′41″N 65°59′43″W	Rothesay municipality (10218)		Upload Photo
George W. Crawford House	2 Brundage Point Road; Grand Bay-Westfield NB	45°20′55″N 66°13′30″W	Grand Bay-Westfield municipality (19343)		Upload Photo
Crosby House	3197 Rothesay Road; Rothesay NB	45°23′10″N 65°59′52″W	Rothesay municipality (7074)		Upload Photo
Depot Hotel	1 Queen Street; Sussex NB	45°43′22″N 65°30′50″W	Sussex municipality (8714)		Upload Photo
Diadema White House	177 Church Avenue; Sussex NB	45°43′02″N 65°30′33″W	Sussex municipality (10307)		Upload Photo
Dominion Building	524 Main Street; Sussex NB	45°43′25″N 65°30′40″W	Sussex municipality (8711)		Upload Photo
Duart Hall	19 Station Road; Rothesay NB	45°23′24″N 65°59′55″W	Rothesay municipality (6978)		Upload Photo
Fairweather Residence	170 Church Avenue; Sussex NB	45°43′04″N 65°30′31″W	Sussex municipality (8708)		Upload Photo
Firshade	3000 Rothesay Road; Rothesay NB	45°22′49″N 65°59′46″W	Rothesay municipality (7051)		Upload Photo
Forbes Residence	60 Essex Street; Sussex NB	45°43′23″N 65°31′09″W	Sussex municipality (10336)		Upload Photo
Fort Nerepis National Historic Site of Canada	Woodman's Point Road; Grand Bay-Westfield NB	45°22′13″N 66°14′03″W	Federal (13166)		
42 Gondola Point Road	42 Gondola Point Road; Rothesay NB	45°23′32″N 65°59′49″W	Rothesay municipality (7107)		Upload Photo
Gunn House	201 St George Street; Sussex NB	45°43′17″N 65°31′24″W	Sussex municipality (10325)		Upload Photo
Hampton Gaol (Jail)	17 Centennial Rd. Hampton NB	45°31′35″N 65°49′35″W	New Brunswick (5735)		
18 Hampton Road	18 Hampton Road; Rothesay NB	45°23′19″N 65°59′39″W	Rothesay municipality (7025)		Upload Photo
Intercolonial Railway Station	Broad Street; Sussex NB	45°43′21″N 65°30′47″W	Federal (6887), Sussex municipality (8712)		
Jonah Residence	977 Main Street; Sussex NB	45°43′03″N 65°29′40″W	Sussex municipality (10305)		Upload Photo
Kennebecasis Rowing Sculpture	Rothesay Road; Rothesay NB	45°22′22″N 66°00′35″W	Rothesay municipality (10246)		Upload Photo
Kings County Court House	648 Main Street; Hampton NB	45°31′35″N 65°49′37″W	New Brunswick (12896)		
Kingston Historic District	Crossroads of Routes 845 and 850; Kingston NB	45°30′10″N 65°58′30″W	New Brunswick (7438)		
Kirkhill Cemetery	Duke Street; Sussex NB	45°43′37″N 65°31′05″W	Sussex municipality (8704)		Upload Photo
Kirtley-Hayter Homestead	171 Woolastook Drive; Grand Bay-Westfield NB	45°19′07″N 66°11′58″W	Grand Bay-Westfield municipality (19339)		Upload Photo
The Knoll	7 Knoll Lane; Rothesay NB	45°23′07″N 65°59′30″W	Rothesay municipality (10221)		Upload Photo
Lewin House	25 Gondola Point Road; Rothesay NB	45°23′24″N 65°59′52″W	Rothesay municipality (7048)		Upload Photo
Lingley Family Homestead	2 Mallard Drive; Grand Bay-Westfield NB	45°21′46″N 66°14′39″W	Grand Bay-Westfield municipality (19341)		Upload Photo
McKnight House	155 Green Road; Rothesay NB	45°22′30″N 65°59′54″W	Rothesay municipality (10244)		Upload Photo
Mount Hope Cemetery	700 Nerepis Road; Grand Bay-Westfield NB	45°23′50″N 66°18′03″W	Grand Bay-Westfield municipality (18341)		Upload Photo
Mount Hope Farm	690 Nerepis Road; Grand Bay-Westfield NB	45°23′48″N 66°17′56″W	New Brunswick (1250)		Upload Photo
Nase Cemetery	Next to 273 Nerepis Road; Grand Bay-Westfield NB	45°21′26″N 66°14′15″W	Grand Bay-Westfield municipality (18363)		Upload Photo
Nerepis School Site	670 Nerepis Road; Grand Bay-Westfield NB	45°23′48″N 66°17′41″W	Grand Bay-Westfield municipality (18342)		Upload Photo
33 Nerepis Road	33 Nerepis Road; Grand Bay-Westfield NB	45°20′05″N 66°12′59″W	Grand Bay-Westfield municipality (18385)		Upload Photo
34 Nerepis Road	34 Nerepis Road; Grand Bay-Westfield NB	45°20′08″N 66°12′56″W	Grand Bay-Westfield municipality (18362)		Upload Photo
52 Nerepis Road	52 Nerepis Road; Grand Bay-Westfield NB	45°20′12″N 66°13′00″W	Grand Bay-Westfield municipality (18386)		Upload Photo
525 Nerepis Road	525 Nerepis Road; Grand Bay-Westfield NB	45°22′46″N 66°16′21″W	Grand Bay-Westfield municipality (18387)		Upload Photo
Old Crosby House	28 Gondola Point Road; Rothesay NB	45°23′26″N 65°59′49″W	Rothesay municipality (6973)		Upload Photo
Old MacDougall Residence	197 Church Avenue; Sussex NB	45°43′00″N 65°30′35″W	Sussex municipality (8709)		Upload Photo
Old Medical Clinic	12 Gondola Point Road; Rothesay NB	45°23′19″N 65°59′50″W	Rothesay municipality (7014)		Upload Photo
Old Portage Trail	633 Nerepis Road; Grand Bay-Westfield NB	45°23′20″N 66°17′05″W	Grand Bay-Westfield municipality (19335)		Upload Photo
Our Lady of Perpetual Help Catholic Church	33 Gondola Point Road; Rothesay NB	45°23′27″N 65°59′52″W	Rothesay municipality (7024)		Upload Photo
Pamdenec Summer Community	Pamdenec Road; Grand Bay-Westfield NB	45°18′58″N 66°11′30″W	Grand Bay-Westfield municipality (18364)		Upload Photo
Porter House	156 Nerepis Road; Grand Bay-Westfield NB	45°20′41″N 66°13′28″W	Grand Bay-Westfield municipality (19330)		Upload Photo
Purd's	64 Gondola Point Road; Rothesay NB	45°23′42″N 65°59′48″W	Rothesay municipality (10219)		Upload Photo
192 River Valley Drive	192 River Valley Drive; Grand Bay-Westfield NB	45°18′08″N 66°11′42″W	Grand Bay-Westfield municipality (18388)		Upload Photo
241 River Valley Drive	241 River Valley Drive; Grand Bay-Westfield NB	45°18′15″N 66°11′42″W	Grand Bay-Westfield municipality (19344)		Upload Photo
Rothesay Common	bordered by Gondola Point Road, Old Hampton Road, and Church Avenue; Rothesay NB	45°23′19″N 65°59′46″W	Rothesay municipality (6975)		Upload Photo
Rothesay Netherwood School	40 College Hill Road; Rothesay NB	45°22′49″N 65°59′30″W	Rothesay municipality (7456)		
Rothesay Railway Station (European and North American) National Historic Site of Canada	near Rothesay Road and Tennis Court Road; Rothesay NB	45°23′00″N 66°00′00″W	Federal (7546)		
3218 Rothesay Road	3218 Rothesay Road; Rothesay NB	45°23′12″N 65°59′47″W	Rothesay municipality (6976)		Upload Photo
St. Augustine's Roman Catholic Church	279 Nerepis Road; Grand Bay-Westfield NB	45°21′34″N 66°14′23″W	Grand Bay-Westfield municipality (18366)		Upload Photo
Saint David's United Church	7 Gondola Point Road; Rothesay NB	45°23′17″N 65°59′51″W	Rothesay municipality (7012)		Upload Photo
St. James Anglican Cemetery	Nerepis Road; Grand Bay-Westfield NB	45°21′03″N 66°13′53″W	Grand Bay-Westfield municipality (19336)		Upload Photo
St. Luke's Anglican Church National Historic Site of Canada	12 Quispamsis Road; Quispamsis NB	45°26′57″N 65°58′33″W	Federal (13555)		Upload Photo
Saint Paul's Anglican Church	6 Church Avenue; Rothesay NB	45°23′22″N 65°59′43″W	Rothesay municipality (7149)		
Sand Point Lighthouse	Sand Point Wharf Road; Grand Bay-Westfield NB	45°20′33″N 66°11′57″W	Federal (20933)		
Satalic House	11 Station Road; Rothesay NB	45°23′19″N 65°59′55″W	Rothesay municipality (7006)		Upload Photo
Shadow Lawn	3180 Rothesay Road; Rothesay NB	45°23′08″N 65°59′47″W	Rothesay municipality (7073)		Upload Photo
Sharp's Corner Drug Store	3 Broad Street; Sussex NB	45°43′24″N 65°30′42″W	Sussex municipality (8716)		Upload Photo
Slipp/Deichmann/Wallace Residence	34 Sunnyside Drive; Sussex NB	45°43′35″N 65°31′17″W	Sussex municipality (8715)		Upload Photo
Squarebriggs Residence	2 Paradise Row; Sussex NB	45°43′18″N 65°31′01″W	Sussex municipality (10320)		Upload Photo
3 Station Road	3 Station Road; Rothesay NB	45°23′15″N 65°59′55″W	Rothesay municipality (7009)		Upload Photo
Stevens Family Cemetery	Brandy Crescent; Grand Bay-Westfield NB	45°19′43″N 66°12′11″W	Grand Bay-Westfield municipality (19334)		Upload Photo
Stevens Homestead	268 Woolastook Drive; Grand Bay-Westfield NB	45°19′28″N 66°12′13″W	Grand Bay-Westfield municipality (19333)		Upload Photo
Stoneycroft	255 Hampton Road; Quispamsis NB	45°24′35″N 65°57′47″W	New Brunswick (10067)		Upload Photo
Strathnaver	3105 Rothesay Road; Rothesay NB	45°23′00″N 65°59′50″W	Rothesay municipality (10216)		Upload Photo
Sussex Ginger Ale Factory	67 Pleasant Avenue; Sussex NB	45°43′13″N 65°30′45″W	Sussex municipality (8696)		Upload Photo
Sutherland Residence	387 Main Street; Sussex NB	45°43′25″N 65°31′04″W	Sussex municipality (10339)		Upload Photo
Trinity Anglican Church	853 Main Street; Sussex NB	45°43′12″N 65°29′59″W	Sussex municipality (8713)		Upload Photo
Trinity Church and Rectory National Historic Site of Canada	Kingston NB	45°30′09″N 65°58′33″W	Federal (12087)		
Wallace Twins Houses	376 and 380 Main Street; Sussex NB	45°25′27″N 65°31′06″W	Sussex municipality (10338)		Upload Photo
Westfield Beach	Grand Bay-Westfield NB	45°21′17″N 66°14′05″W	Grand Bay-Westfield municipality (18367)		Upload Photo
Westfield Golf and Country Club	8 Golf Club Road; Grand Bay-Westfield NB	45°20′12″N 66°13′17″W	Grand Bay-Westfield municipality (18365)		Upload Photo
Westfield United Church	268 Woolastook Drive; Grand Bay-Westfield NB	45°20′30″N 66°13′19″W	Grand Bay-Westfield municipality (19329)		
Westfield Wharf Site	Grand Bay-Westfield NB	45°20′56″N 66°13′27″W	Grand Bay-Westfield municipality (18361)		
Williamson Residence	371 Main Street; Sussex NB	45°43′26″N 65°31′07″W	Sussex municipality (10341)		Upload Photo
Wolastoq National Historic Site of Canada	Entire watershed of Saint John River central and western New Brunswick, parts of southeastern Quebec NB	45°20′24″N 66°12′20″W	Federal (18954)		More images

== See also ==
- List of historic places in New Brunswick
- List of National Historic Sites of Canada in New Brunswick
