= List of historic places in Sunbury County, New Brunswick =

This article is a list of historic places in Sunbury County, New Brunswick entered on the Canadian Register of Historic Places, whether they are federal, provincial, or municipal.

== List of historic places ==
Name	Address	Coordinates	Government recognition (CRHP №)	Wikidata ID	Image
Belmont House / R. Wilmot Home National Historic Site of Canada	Lincoln Road (NB Route 102); Lincoln NB	45°54′49″N 66°35′14″W	Federal (1192)		Upload Photo
George Brown House	325 MacDonald Avenue; Oromocto NB	45°50′56″N 66°29′00″W	Oromocto municipality (18391)		Upload Photo
Building 2	Acadia Forest Experimental Station; Maugerville NB	46°09′59″N 66°17′00″W	Federal (4368)		Upload Photo
Building 8	Acadia Forest Experimental Station; Maugerville NB	46°10′01″N 66°17′00″W	Federal (4371)		Upload Photo
Building 10	Acadia Forest Experimental Station; Maugerville NB	46°10′00″N 66°17′00″W	Federal (4373)		Upload Photo
Building 11	Acadia Forest Experimental Station; Maugerville NB	46°10′00″N 66°17′00″W	Federal (4372)		Upload Photo
Building 12	Acadia Forest Experimental Station; Maugerville NB	46°10′00″N 66°17′01″W	Federal (4369)		Upload Photo
Building 15	Acadia Forest Experimental Station; Maugerville NB	45°55′N 66°20′W	Federal (3152)		Upload Photo
Burpee-Bridges House	2111 Rt. 105. Sheffield NB	45°53′07″N 66°21′35″W	New Brunswick (5837)		Upload Photo
Christ Church Anglican National Historic Site of Canada	Maugerville NB	45°52′17″N 66°26′47″W	Federal (12026)		Upload Photo
Oromocto Cenotaph	MacDonald Avenue; Oromocto NB	45°51′03″N 66°28′27″W	Oromocto municipality (18392)		Upload Photo
St. John's Anglican Church and Graveyard	60 Broad Road; Oromocto NB	45°50′59″N 66°28′21″W	Oromocto municipality (18389)		Upload Photo
Wolastoq National Historic Site of Canada	Entire watershed of Saint John River central and western New Brunswick, parts of southeastern Quebec NB	45°51′47″N 66°27′22″W	Federal (18954)		More images

== See also ==
- List of historic places in New Brunswick
- List of National Historic Sites of Canada in New Brunswick
