= Dundas Parish =

Parish in Canada

Dundas
- Parish
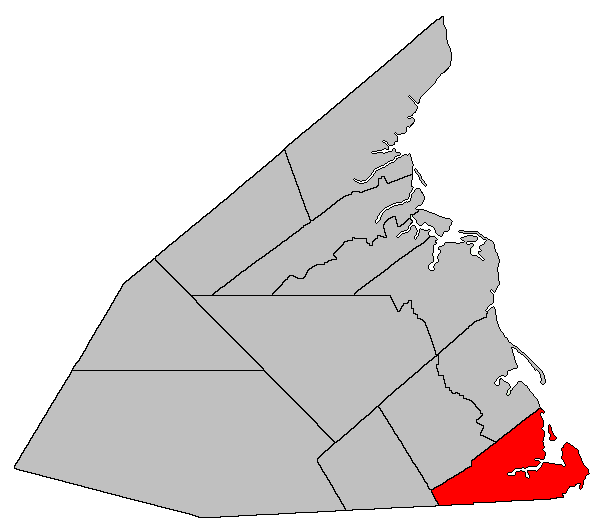
- Location within Kent County, New Brunswick.
- Coordinates: 46.27°N 64.86°W
- Country: Canada
- Province: New Brunswick
- County: Kent
- Erected: 1827

Area
  - Land: 172.32 km^{2} (66.53 sq mi)

Population (2021)
  - Total: 4,332
  - Density: 25.1/km^{2} (65/sq mi)
  - Change 2016-2021: ▲10.7%
  - Dwellings: 2,569
- Time zone: UTC-4 (AST)
  - Summer (DST): UTC-3 (ADT)
- Figures do not include portion within the rural community of Cocagne

Dundas is a geographic parish in Kent County, New Brunswick, Canada. (Note: The Territorial Division Act divides the province into 152 parishes, the cities of Saint John and Fredericton, and one town of Grand Falls. The Interpretation Act clarifies that parishes include any local government within their borders.)

For governance purposes it is divided between the towns of Champdoré and Grand-Bouctouche and the rural communities of Beausoleil and Maple Hills; Maple Hills is a member of the Southeast Regional Service Commission, while the others belong to the Kent RSC.

Prior to the 2023 governance reform, the parish was divided between the village of Saint-Antoine, the rural community of Cocagne and the local service districts of Grande-Digue, Grand Saint-Antoine, Shediac Bridge-Shediac River, the parish of Dundas, and (through its Saint-Grégoire special service area) the parish of Wellington. Cocagne, Grande-Digue, and Shediac Bridge-Shediac River, and most of the Dundas Parish LSD are now part of Beausoleil, Saint-Antoine and Grand Saint-Antoine part of Champdoré, while the community of Dundas in the western end of the parish is part of Maple Hills.

The parish LSD was informally referred to as Notre-Dame after one its communities.

== Origin of name ==
One possible honouree is Robert Saunders Dundas, First Lord of the Admiralty at the time of its erection. Another is Ann Dundas, wife of Sir Howard Douglas, Lieutenant Governor of New Brunswick when the parish was erected.

== History ==
Dundas was erected in 1827 from Wellington Parish.

In 1828 the boundary with Wellington was adjusted to run along grant lines near Després Road and west from there.

In 1862 the boundary with Wellington was adjusted to its modern line.

== Boundaries ==
Dundas Parish is bounded:

- on the northwest by a line beginning on the shore of Northumberland Strait near Bar-de-Cocagne, then running south 72º 30' west (Note: By the magnet of 1862, when declination in the area was between 21º and 22º west of north.) to the western line of a grant on the western side of the junction of Gérard Road and Robichaud Cross Road, a bit north of Robichaud Cross Road, then southwesterly along the grant line to the northwestern line of a grant straddling Gérard Road, part of a tier of grants on the northwestern side of Alexandrina Road, then southwesterly along the rear line of the tier and its prolongation to Route 490;
- on the east by Northumberland Strait;
- on the south by the Westmorland County line;
- on the west by Route 490;
- including all islands in front of the parish.

== Communities ==
Communities at least partly within the parish; bold indicates a municipality or incorporated rural community; italics indicate a name no longer in official use

- Alexandrina
- Caissie Cape
- Dufourville
- Dundas
- Goudalie
- Grande-Digue
- Notre-Dame
- Poirier
- **Saint-Antoine**
- Whites Settlement

- **rural community of Cocagne**
  - Bourgeois
  - Breau-Village
  - Cap-de-Cocagne
  - Cocagne
  - Cocagne Cove
  - Cocagne-Nord (Gueguen, Lower Gueguen)
  - Cocagne-Sud
  - Cormierville
  - Côte-d'Or
  - Després-Village
  - Saint-Marcel
  - Saint-Martin-de-Kent

== Bodies of water ==
Bodies of water (Note: Not including brooks, ponds or coves.) at least partly in the parish:

- Rivière à l'Anguille
- Cocagne River
- Northumberland Strait
- Cocagne Harbour
- La Passe

== Islands ==
Islands at least partly in the parish:

- Cocagne Island
- Surette Island

== Demographics ==
Parish population total does not include village of Saint-Antoine and (after 2011) rural community of Cocagne

=== Population ===
**Population trend**

Census	Population	Change (%)
2016	3,914	▼1.4%
2011 Revision	3,970	▼36.8%
2011	6,282	▼1.2%
2006	6,356	▲2.9%
2001	6,174	▲0.2%
1996	6,162	▲3.5%
1991	5,951	N/A

=== Language ===
**Mother tongue (2016)**

Language	Population	Pct (%)
French only	2,960	75.2%
English only	870	22.1%
Both English and French	60	1.5%
Other languages	45	1.2%

== See also ==
- List of parishes in New Brunswick
