= New Brunswick Route 525 =

Highway in New Brunswick, Canada

Coordinates: 46.395963°N 64.791698°W

Route 525

Route information
- Maintained by New Brunswick Department of Transportation

Major junctions
- North end: Route 515 in Sainte-Marie-de-Kent
- South end: Route 115 in Champdoré

Location
- Country: Canada
- Province: New Brunswick

Highway system
- Provincial highways in New Brunswick; Former routes
← Route 515	→ Route 530

Route 525 is a 10-kilometre (6.2 mi) long east–west secondary highway in the northwest portion of New Brunswick, Canada.

The route's northern terminus is at Route 515 in the community of Sainte-Marie-de-Kent. The road crosses the Bouctouche River between the communities of Upper Buctouche and Roy. The road travels northeast as Coates Mills South Road before turning southeast near the community of Roy, where it is called Champ Dore Road. Route 525 passes through the community of Champdoré before ending at Route 115.
