= List of historic places in New Brunswick =

This is a list of lists of historic places in the province of New Brunswick by county or city, from the Canadian Register of Historic Places, which includes federal, provincial, and municipal designations.

- Moncton
- St. Andrews
- Albert County
- Carleton County
- Charlotte County outside St. Andrews
- Gloucester County
- Kent County
- Kings County
- Madawaska County
- Northumberland County
- Queens County
- Restigouche County
- Saint John County
- Sunbury County
- Victoria County
- Westmorland County outside Moncton
- York County

== See also ==
- List of National Historic Sites in New Brunswick
- Lists of historic places in Canada
