= Stone Church (Saint John) =

St. John's Anglican Church
- St. John's Anglican Church (Stone Church)
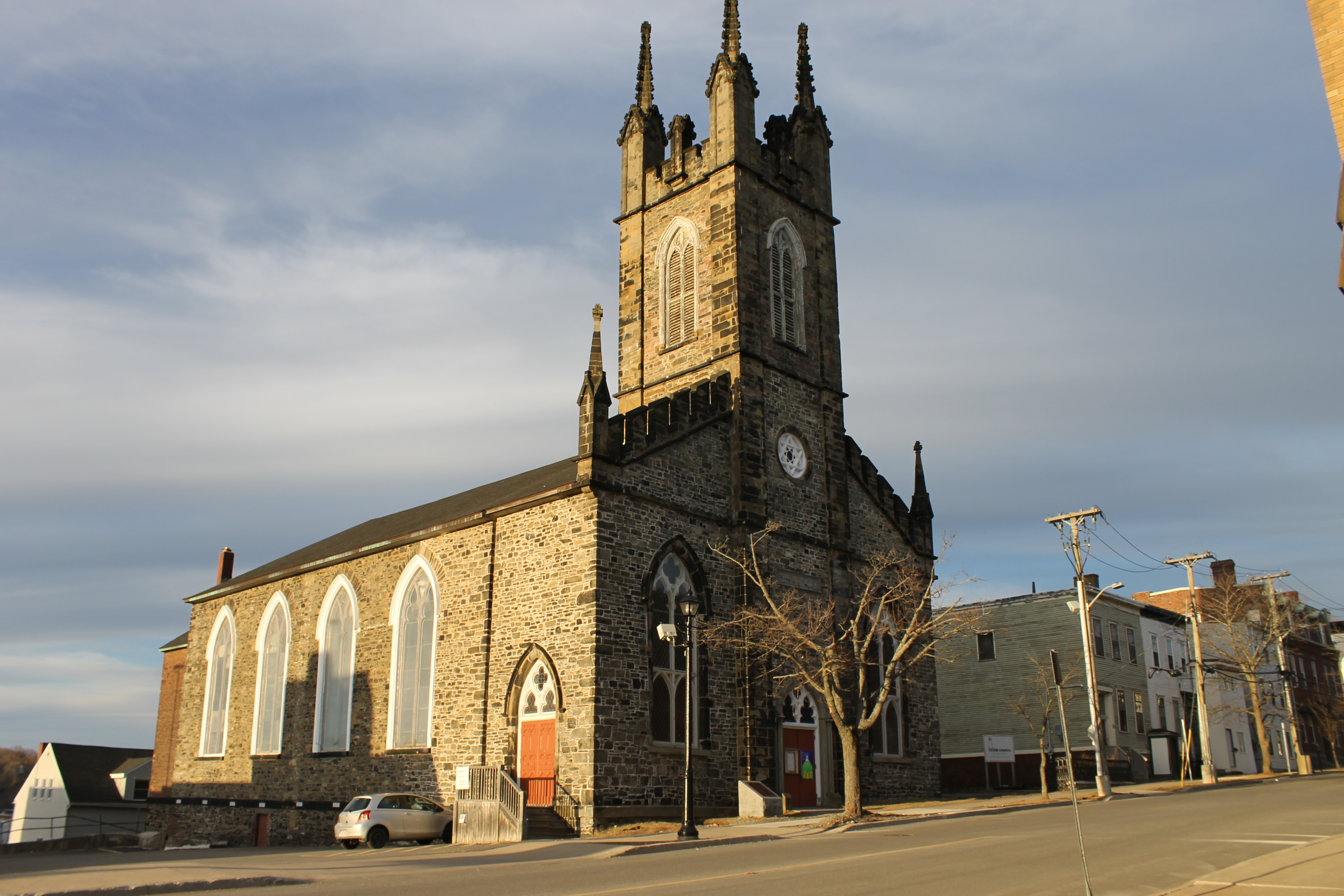

- Location within New Brunswick
- 45.276153°N 66.061609°W
- Location: 87 Carleton Street, Saint John, New Brunswick, Canada
- Country: Canada
- Denomination: Anglican Church of Canada
- Website: www.stonesj.org

History
- Status: Parish church
- Founded: 1824
- Dedicated: September 11, 1825 (first service)

Architecture
- Functional status: Active
- Heritage designation

National Historic Site of Canada
- Official name: St. John's Anglican Church / Stone Church
- Type: National Historic Site of Canada
- Designated: June 22, 1989
- Architect(s): John Cunningham (original); Matthew Stead (chancel)
- Architectural type: Gothic Revival
- Groundbreaking: 1823
- Completed: 1826

Specifications
- Materials: Stone

Administration
- Diocese: Diocese of Fredericton
- Parish: St. John - Stone Church

St. John's Anglican Church, commonly known as the Stone Church, is a historic Anglican church located at 87 Carleton Street in Saint John, New Brunswick, Canada. Built between 1823 and 1826, it is one of the earliest examples of Gothic Revival architecture in Canada and one of the oldest church buildings in Saint John. The church was designated a National Historic Site of Canada in 1989.

== History ==
In 1822, a "Chapel of Ease" was chosen for construction by the Vestry of Trinity Church for the growing Anglican population along with British garrison members stationed in Saint John. Construction began in 1823, using ballast stones imported from England. The church was designed by architect John Cunningham and built by Lloyd Johnston. The first service was held on September 11, 1825, although the building was not completed until 1826.

== See also ==
- List of National Historic Sites of Canada in New Brunswick
- Roman numeral
