= Champ-Doré =

French explorer

Pierre Angibault (or Angibaut), known as Champ-Doré or Champdoré, was a ship's captain in the marine of New France. He was a member of the settlement in Acadia from 1604 to 1607, and he took part in all the voyages of exploration. He made a voyage to the coast of Maine in 1608.

Lescarbot praised him in a sonnet, insisting upon his skill as a captain:

Quand ta dextérité empêche d’abîmer
La nef qui va sous toi du Ponant à l’Aurore ...

== See also ==
- Champdoré
- Samuel de Champlain

== Bibliography ==
- B. F. De Costa: The voyage of Pierre Angibaut, known as Champdoré, captain in the marine of New France, made to the coast of Maine, 1608. J. Munsell's Sons D. Clapp and Son, printers, 1891
- Léon Guérin: Les navigateurs français: Histoire des navigations, découvertes et colonisations françaises. Belin-Leprieur et Morizot, Paris 1847
- Champlain, Works (H. P. Biggar), I, 363 et n., 378–87, 458, et passim.
- Lescarbot, Histoire de la Nouvelle-France (Tross), II, 434 f., et passim; III, 57
