= Monument Lefebvre =

Coordinates: 45.979389°N 64.566661°W

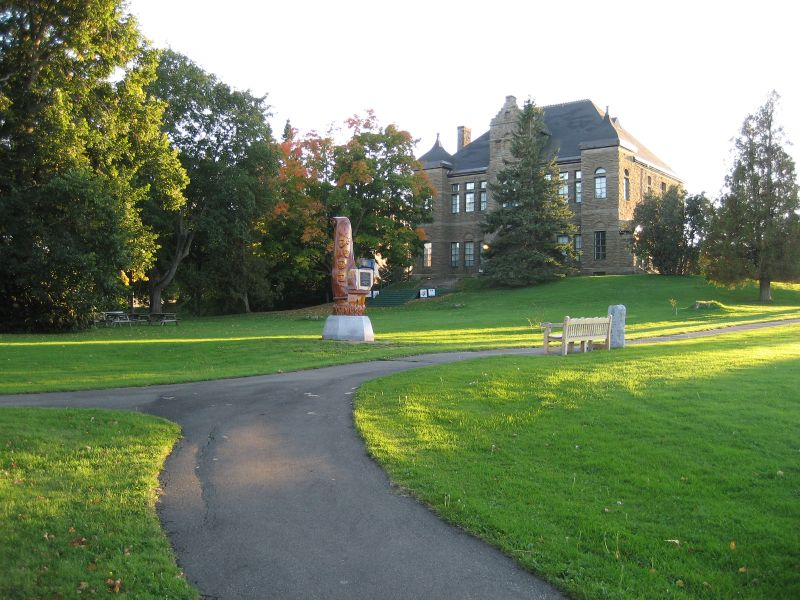
Monument Lefebvre

Monument–Lefebvre National Historic Site is a rusticated sandstone building in Memramcook, New Brunswick, Canada. It was first designated as Survival of the Acadians National Historic Site in 1978, on the advice of the national Historic Sites and Monuments Board. In 1994, it was redesignated as Monument Lefebvre National Historic Site, a memorial to Father Camille Lefebvre who established Collège Saint-Joseph in 1864. The college and this building came to symbolize a resurgence of Acadian culture that began in the 19th century, one that continues through ongoing programs and displays. This cultural revival is commemorated by the site.

The college, which ceased operation in the 1960s, eventually became part of the Université de Moncton, and the surrounding grounds are now part of a resort and conference center. The site has featured exhibits about Acadian history since 1978. The current exhibit is titled "Reflections of a Journey—the Odyssey of the Acadian People".
