= Sainte-Marie-de-Kent, New Brunswick =

Sainte-Marie-de-Kent
- Village
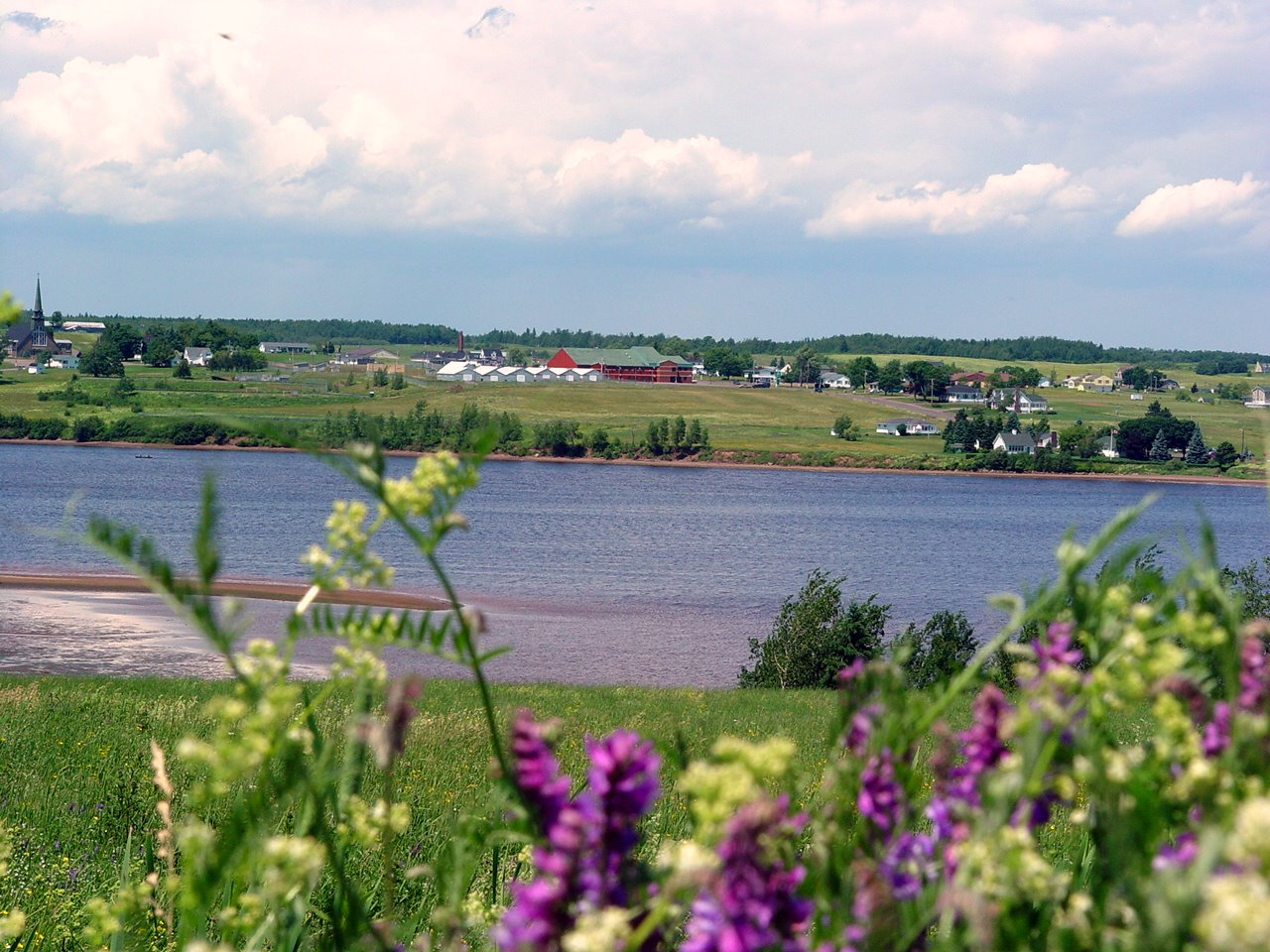

- Location within New Brunswick
- Coordinates: 46.4163°N 64.8277°W
- Country: Canada
- Province: New Brunswick
- County: Kent County
- Parish: Sainte-Marie Parish, New Brunswick
- Highest elevation: 23 m (75 ft)
- Lowest elevation: 0 m (0 ft)
- Time zone: UTC−4 (AST)
  - Summer (DST): UTC−3 (ADT)
- Canadian Postal code: E4S
- Area code: 506
- Highway: Route 515
- Waterway: Bouctouche River

Sainte-Marie-de-Kent (most often referred to as Sainte-Marie) is an unincorporated Canadian village located at the intersection of Route 515 and Route 525 in Kent County, New Brunswick. It is in the parish of Saint Mary.

The village is located 45 km north of Moncton and its residents are largely Acadians, most of whom speak French in its local variant Chiac.

Sainte-Marie-de-Kent is the site of the Kent County Agricultural Fair, one of New Brunswick's oldest and largest agricultural fairs, a five-day event which has been held annually since 1956, during the final full week of August.

== See also ==
- List of communities in New Brunswick
