= Camille Lefebvre =

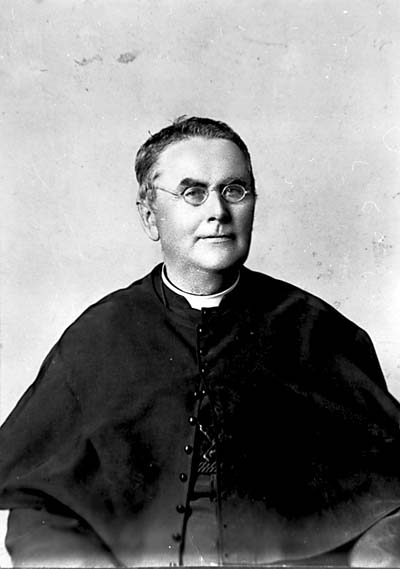
Camille Lefebvre, before 1895

Camille Lefebvre, C.S.C. (14 February 1831 – 28 January 1895) was a Holy Cross father and vicar general for the Acadian population of New Brunswick, Nova Scotia and Prince Edward Island (Maritime Canada).

Born in Saint Philippe-de-Laprairie, Lower Canada, he was an itinerant primary school teacher before beginning religious studies in 1852, at the Congregation of Holy Cross at Saint-Laurent near Montreal. He was ordained a priest on 29 July 1855 at age 24. First appointed as assistant priest in the rural parish of Saint-Eustache, he afterwards taught at a business college in Saint-Aimé (Massueville) in the diocese of Saint-Hyacinthe.

In 1863, Bishop John Sweeny of New Brunswick recognized a need to provide education to the French speaking Catholic population the Maritime colonies, as well as English-speaking Catholics of Irish and Scottish descent.

Under Sweeny's mandate, in the fall of 1864 Father Lefebvre founded St. Joseph's College in Memramcook, New Brunswick as a post-secondary centre of learning. It received a provincial charter in 1868 and became eligible for financial support from the government. However the funding only lasted until 1871 when New Brunswick passed its controversial Common Schools Act which attempted to secularize education in the province. In refusing to accept the requirements of the Act, Father Lefebvre forfeited future funding and as a result, the college remained in financial difficulties for the rest of its existence. Nonetheless, the college would make a significant impact within Acadian and English Catholic society by creating a necessary educated class.

Father Lefebvre died on 28 January 1895. Three years later, the College was granted university status in 1898. The College remained open until the 1960s when it was absorbed into the University of Moncton.

His life and work are commemorated at Monument Lefebvre where the college was founded, and where he died.

His biographer was Pascal Poirier.
