= La Coupe Dry Dock =

Historic site in New Brunswick, Canada

Coordinates: 45°54′56″N 64°16′00″W

La Coupe Dry Dock National Historic Site
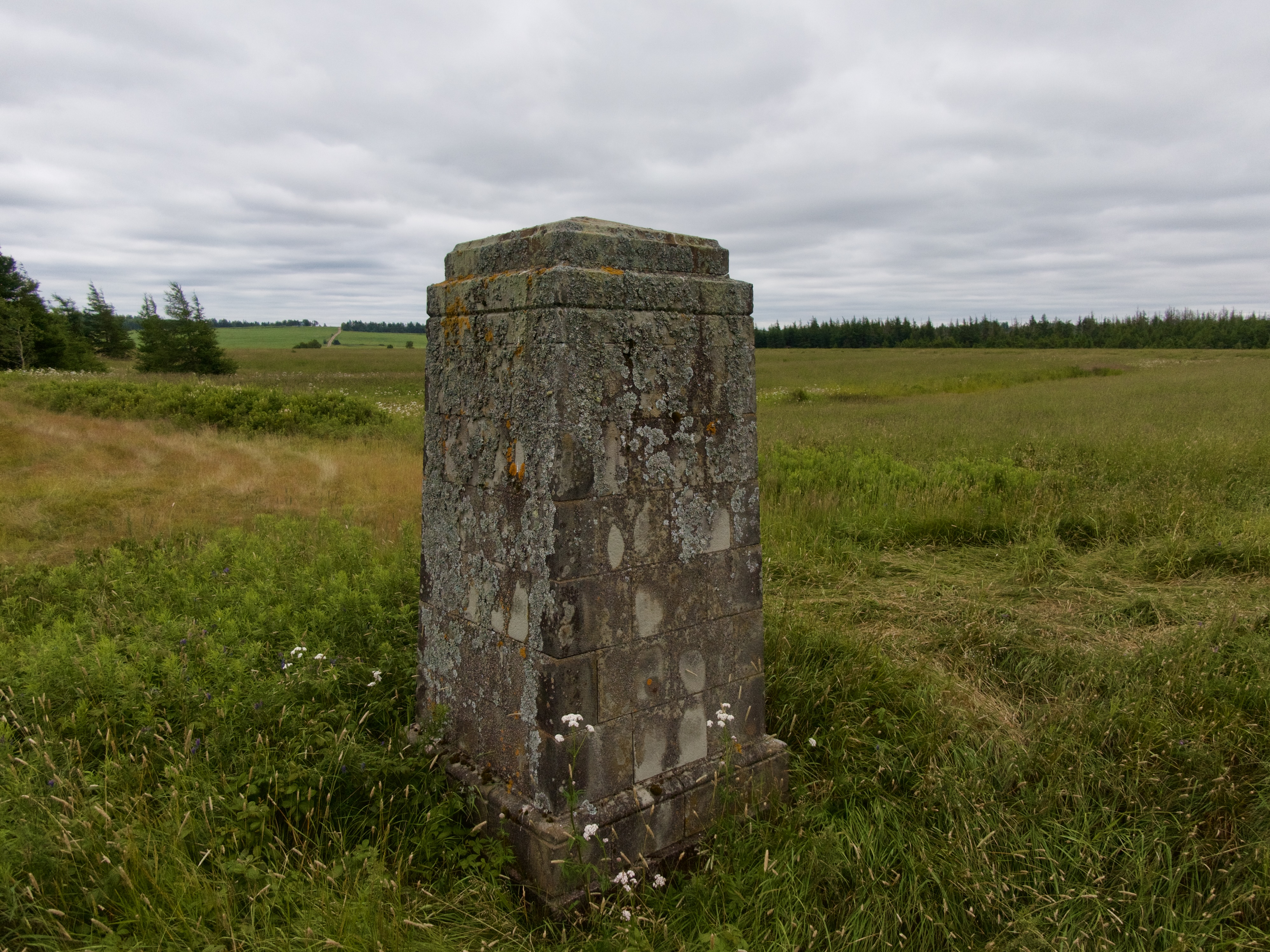
- La Coupe Dry Dock in 2025
- Interactive map of La Coupe Dry Dock National Historic Site
- Location: Point de Bute, New Brunswick, Canada

History
- Built: Early 18th century (traditional attribution)

Site notes
- Governing body: Parks Canada

La Coupe Dry Dock National Historic Site is a designated cultural heritage site located near Point de Bute, New Brunswick, Canada. It consists of two large earthen berms on the La Coupe River that have long been associated with Acadian settlement in the region. Early 20th-century tradition identified the structure as an Acadian dry dock built prior to the Expulsion of the Acadians, though its original purpose remains uncertain.

Modern historians note that no archaeological investigation has confirmed the site’s function. In a 2025 interview with CBC News, historian James Upham emphasized that while local knowledge long described the feature as a dry dock, “we really don’t know what this was,” and the surviving earthworks provide only limited clues.

The site was designated for its association with Acadian history rather than for a confirmed industrial function. If a dry dock had existed at the location, it would have represented a very early example of this technology in North America. Dry docks were essential for maintaining wooden vessels, which required regular cleaning to remove marine growth and prevent damage from shipworms.

== Commemorative plaque ==
A commemorative plaque, installed in 1954 but now missing, recorded the traditional interpretation of the site. Its text, preserved in archival sources, read:

« Cale sèche de Chignectou. Cette disposition quadrilatérale de digues aurait été construite par les Acadiens afin de régler le courant de la rivière La Coupe, permettant l'entrée et la sortie de vaisseaux de grandeur moyenne. »

"Chignecto Dry Dock. This quadrilateral arrangement of dikes is believed to have been constructed by the Acadians to regulate the current of the La Coupe River, allowing the entry and departure of vessels of medium size."
