= Saint-Basile, New Brunswick =

Community in New Brunswick, Canada

Coordinates: 47°22′55″N 68°12′37″W

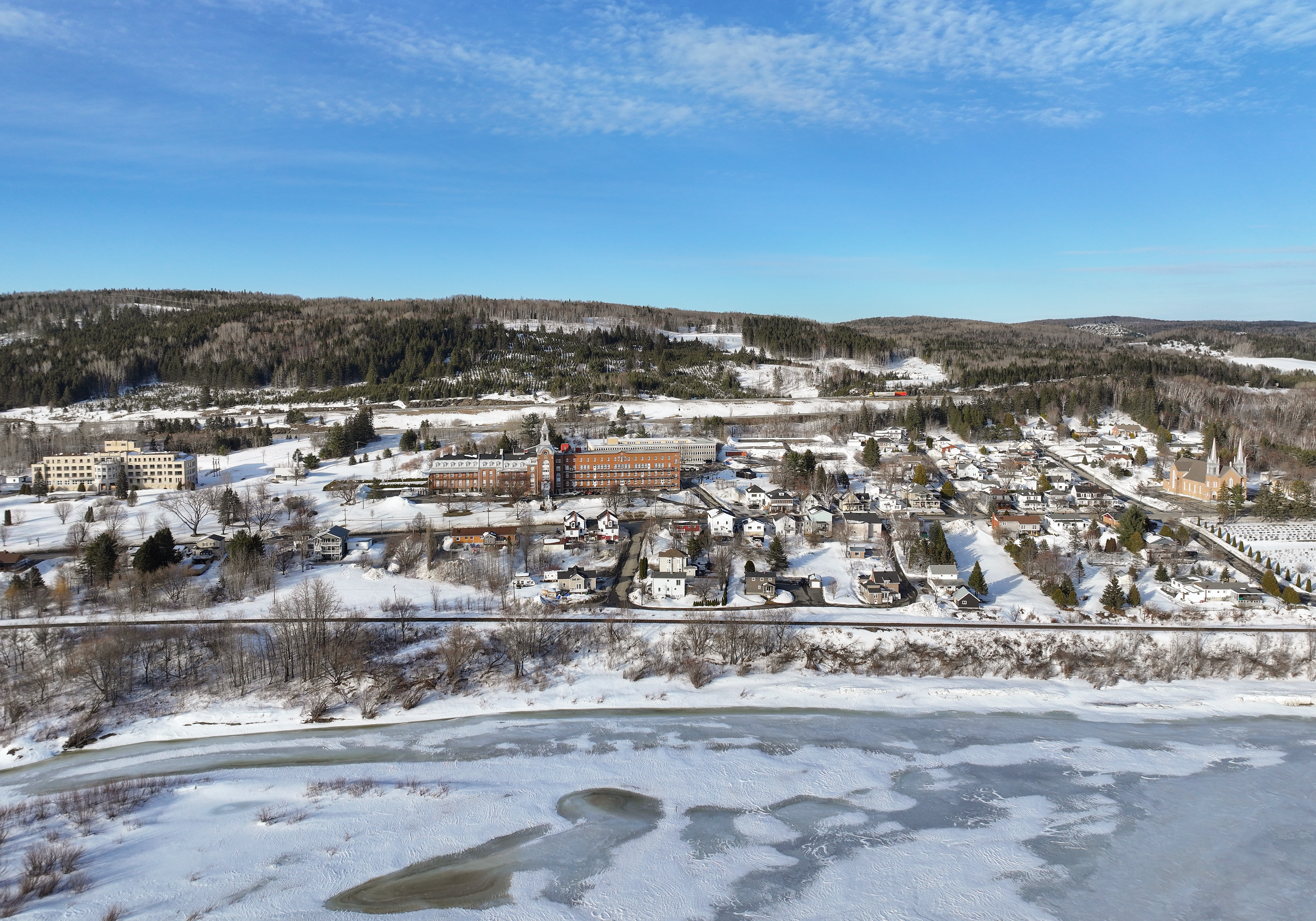
Saint-Basile

Saint-Basile is a community in Madawaska County, New Brunswick, Canada. Formerly a separate municipality, it was amalgamated into the city of Edmundston on May 25, 1998. The 2006 Canadian Census recorded a population of 3,751.

== See also ==
- List of neighbourhoods in New Brunswick
