= Saint-Antoine, New Brunswick =

Saint-Antoine
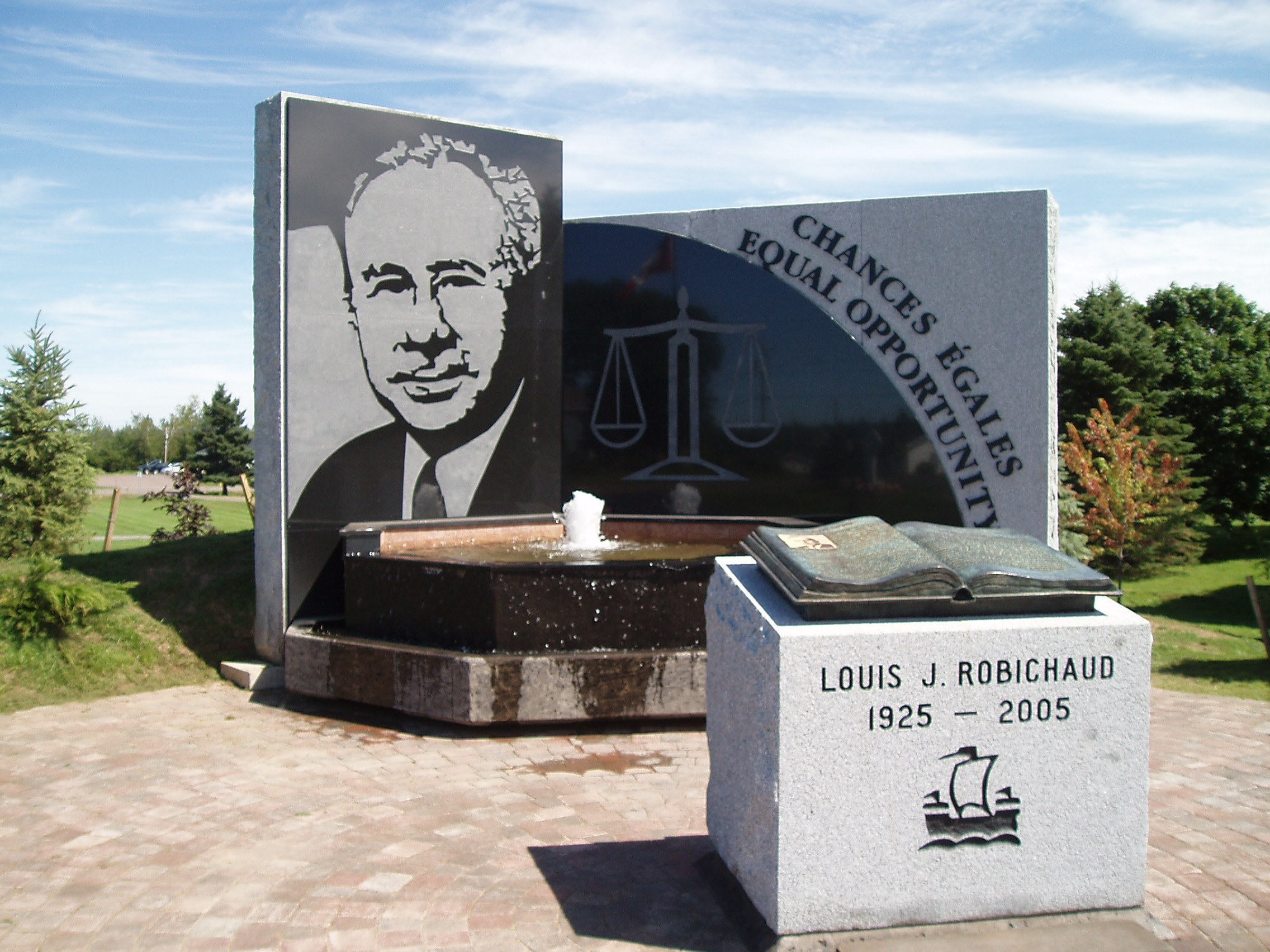
- Louis J. Robichaud memorial

- Coat of arms
- Motto: "P'tite ville en campagne"
- Location within New Brunswick
- Coordinates: 46.36286°N 64.75260°W
- Country: Canada
- Province: New Brunswick
- County: Kent County
- Town: Champdoré
- Founded: 1832
- Incorporated: November 9, 1966

Area
  - Land: 6.32 km^{2} (2.44 sq mi)

Population (2021)
  - Total: 1,791
  - Density: 283.6/km^{2} (735/sq mi)
  - Change (2016–21): ▲3.3%
- Time zone: UTC−4 (AST)
  - Summer (DST): UTC−3 (ADT)
- Area code: 506

Saint-Antoine (French pronunciation: [sɛ̃t‿ɑ̃twan]) is a former village in Kent County, New Brunswick, Canada. It is 35 km north of Moncton and 18 km Southwest of Bouctouche. Saint-Antoine is on Route 115 and Route 525. It is now part of the town of Champdoré.

== History ==
The village is named in honour of Anthony the Great. From 1966, it was called St. Anthony until it was changed to Saint-Antoine in 1969. The village was originally called Higho Settlement. Saint-Antoine was the birthplace of Louis Robichaud, Canada's first elected Acadian provincial premier.

On 1 January 2023, Saint-Antoine amalgamated with all or part of six local service districts to form the new town of Champdoré. The community's name remains in official use.

== Demographics ==
In the 2021 Census of Population conducted by Statistics Canada, Saint-Antoine had a population of 1,791 living in 743 of its 779 total private dwellings, a change of 3.3% from its 2016 population of 1,733. With a land area of 6.32 km^{2} (2.44 sq mi), it had a population density of 283.4/km^{2} (734.0/sq mi) in 2021.

Population trend

Census	Population	Change (%)
2016	1,733	▼-2.1%
2011	1,770	▲14.5%
2006	1,546	▲4.8%
2001	1,472	▲0.6%
1996	1,463	▲5.7%
1991	1,380	▲3.9%
1986	1,328	▲8.2%
1981	1,219	N/A

Religious make-up (2001)

Religion	Population	Pct (%)
Catholic	1,385	97.53%
Protestant	10	0.70%
No religious affiliation	30	2.11%

Income (2006)

Income type	By CAD
Per capita income	$23,718
Median Household Income	$49,790
Median Family Income	$56,941

Mother tongue (2016)

Language	Population	Pct (%)
French	1,435	86.97%
English	195	11.82%
Multiple responses	20	1.21%

== See also ==
- List of communities in New Brunswick
