= List of National Historic Sites of Canada in New Brunswick =

This is a list of National Historic Sites (French: Lieux historiques nationaux) in the province of New Brunswick. There are 63 National Historic Sites designated in New Brunswick, as of 2018, eight of which are administered by Parks Canada (identified below by the beaver icon). The first National Historic Sites to be designated in New Brunswick were Fort Beauséjour – Fort Cumberland and Fort Gaspareaux in 1920. However, the first historical property in the national park system was Fort Howe National Park in Saint John, created in 1914.

Numerous National Historic Events also occurred across New Brunswick, and are identified at places associated with them, using the same style of federal plaque which marks National Historic Sites. Several National Historic Persons are commemorated throughout the province in the same way. The markers do not indicate which designation—a Site, Event, or Person—a subject has been given.

This list uses names designated by the national Historic Sites and Monuments Board, which may differ from other names for these sites.

== National Historic Sites ==
Site	Date(s)	Designated	Location	Description	Image
1 Chipman Hill	1854 (c.) (completed)	1984	Saint John; 45°16′26.66″N 66°3′47.43″W	Symbolic of upper-middle class urban housing in Saint John during the mid-19th century; features a variety of decorative trompe-l'œil wall and ceiling murals	Exterior of 1 Chipman Hill
Arts Building	1827 (completed)	1951	Fredericton; 45°56′53.93″N 66°38′28.65″W	A classically inspired masonry structure at the University of New Brunswick; the oldest university building in Canada still in continuous use	Exterior of the Arts Building
Augustine Mound	500 (c.) BCE (established)	1975	Metepenagiag Mi'kmaq Nation; 46°55′48.37″N 65°49′20.06″W	A circular ritual site surrounding a burial mound; a sacred site representative of Mi'kmaq spirituality, exhibiting Adena burial rituals	
Beaubears Island Shipbuilding	1790 (established)	2001	Miramichi; 46.977535°N 65.561670°W	A 24-hectare (59-acre) site featuring the remains of an early 19th-century shipyard typical of a New Brunswick one in its time; an undisturbed cultural landscape combining national and archaeological features associated with 19th-century shipbuilding in eastern Canada	Beaubears Island
Belmont House / R. Wilmot Home	1820 (completed)	1975	Lincoln; 45°54′49.39″N 66°35′14.05″W	A large neoclassical country house associated with Robert Duncan Wilmot, a Father of Confederation	
Boishébert	1756 (camp established)	1930	Miramichi; 46°58′11.17″N 65°34′42.99″W	The site of a camp at Wilson's Point and additionally comprising most of the adjacent Beaubears Island where Acadians, under the leadership of Charles Deschamps de Boishébert, sought refuge from 1756 to 1760 during the Expulsion of the Acadians	Monument at Boishébert
Carleton Martello Tower	1815 (completed)	1930	Saint John; 45°15′7.53″N 66°4′33.54″W	A martello tower located across the harbour from downtown Saint John, built to protect the city from an American land attack during the War of 1812; representative of the type of coastal defence used by the British during the Napoleonic era	View of Carleton Martello Tower
Chandler House / Rocklyn	1831 (completed)	1971	Dorchester; 45°53′54.78″N 64°30′54.56″W	A Classical Revival–style house associated with Edward Barron Chandler, a Father of Confederation	
Charlotte County Court House	1840 (completed)	1981	St. Andrews; 45°4′32.47″N 67°2′57.26″W	A simple wood-frame courthouse with a pedimented portico; the best preserved example in New Brunswick of the typical mid-19th century Maritime courthouse	Sepia photograph of the Charlotte County Court House in 1895
Christ Church Anglican	1856 (completed)	1990	Maugerville; 45°52′17.08″N 66°26′46.72″W	A wooden church illustrative of the ecclesiological phase of Gothic Revival architecture in Canada	
Christ Church Cathedral	1853 (completed)	1981	Fredericton; 45°57′27″N 66°38′5.86″W	A cathedral whose spire is a landmark in the historic centre of Fredericton; one of the best examples of ecclesiological Gothic Revival architecture in Canada, and one which established an architectural pattern followed in the design of many churches in 19th-century Canada	Exterior view of Christ Church Cathedral
Connell House	1840 (completed)	1975	Woodstock; 46°9′3.96″N 67°34′30.36″W	A Greek Revival wooden mansion distinguished by a double-height columned verandah; in the early 19th century, large homes inspired by classical temples were common in the United States, but comparatively rare in Canada	Exterior view of Connell House in winter
Denys Fort / Habitation	1600s (c.) (established)	1952	Shippagan; 47°52′52.75″N 64°35′22.02″W	Archaeological remains of a 17th-century French trading post; became a common resort for French fishermen, fur traders and missionaries, and a trading point between them and the Micmac Indians; the Jesuits operated a mission for the inhabitants living there	Denys Fort / Habitation
Fort Beauséjour – Fort Cumberland	1751 (established)	1920	Aulac; 45°51′52.49″N 64°17′29.62″W	A star-shaped fort that defended French interests in the Chignecto isthmus; after its capture by the British in 1755, the fort repulsed an attack by American revolutionary sympathizers in 1776, which contributed to keeping Nova Scotia in the British Empire	The remains of the fort in 2006
Fort Charnisay	1645 (established)	1923	Saint John; 45°15′46.04″N 66°4′32.63″W	The site of a succession of military forts between 1645 and 1775 due to its strategic position on the western edge of the city's harbour and overlooking the Saint John River; today the site is marked by a cairn and a boulder	Plaque commemorating the series of forts that were built at this site
Fort Gaspareaux	1751 (established)	1920	Strait Shores; 46°2′34.4″N 64°4′14.7″W	An archaeological site containing traces of a French fort; symbolic of the struggle between France and Britain for North America in the 1750s	Fort Gaspareaux site in 2006
Fort Howe	1777 (established)	1914/1966	Saint John; 45°16′36″N 66°04′23″W	The partial reconstruction of a fort that guarded Saint John from the American Revolutionary War through to the War of 1812; the fort's designation as a National Historic Park in 1914 marked the beginning of Canada's emerging system of National Historic Sites. Fort Howe was in the national park system from 1914 to 1930, when it was given to the city. It was later designated a National Historic Site in 1966 outside the park system.	Blockhouse at Fort Howe
Fort Jemseg	1659 (established)	1927	Jemseg; 45°46′6.72″N 66°7′56.01″W	Site of an English trading post, captured by the Dutch in 1674 under Captain Jurriaen Aernouts, who named the country New Holland, claiming possession for the Prince of Orange	
Fort La Tour	1631 (established)	1923	Saint John; 45°16′21.76″N 66°4′20.18″W	An archaeological site containing the remains of a 17th-century fortified fur-trading post established by Charles de Saint-Étienne de la Tour; one of the earliest centres of the French fur trade with the Aboriginal peoples in the region	Monument to Fort La Tour
Fort Nashwaak (Naxoat)	1691 (established)	1924	Fredericton; 45°57′40.87″N 66°37′36.07″W	The site of a French fort that had once sat at the mouth of the Nashwaak River where it meets the Saint John River; the base of many raids against New England, one of which resulted in the Siege of Pemaquid in 1696	Monument to Fort Nashwaak
Fort Nerepis	1659 (fort established)	1930	Grand Bay–Westfield; 45°22′12″N 66°14′3.12″W	A cairn marking the approximate site of a fortified Maliseet stronghold, and then a small French fort, at the confluence of the Nerepis River and Saint John River; the remains of the fortifications and their precise locations have never been found	Plaque and cairn marking the approximate location of Fort Nerepis
Fredericton City Hall	1876 (completed)	1984	Fredericton; 45°57′48.87″N 66°38′35.29″W	A three-storey, Second Empire style town hall; the oldest municipal hall in Atlantic Canada still used for civic administration	Exterior view of Fredericton City Hall
Fredericton Military Compound	1784 (established)	1960	Fredericton; 45°57′45.58″N 66°38′26.64″W	An important grouping of British colonial-era military buildings, which has served as premises for both military and government institutions for over 200 years	The Soldiers' Barracks in the Fredericton Military Compound
Free Meeting House	1821 (completed)	1990	Moncton; 46°5′38.59″N 64°46′26.52″W	A simple wood-frame meeting house that, as the only local place of worship at the time, was used by all denominations; a symbol of religious tolerance in the Maritimes	Postcard of the Free Meeting House, c. 1940
Greenock Church	1824 (completed)	1994	St. Andrews; 45°4′36.8″N 67°3′13.18″W	A church noteworthy for its role in the development of Presbyterianism in New Brunswick; an excellent example of the Palladian style in Canadian church architecture	Exterior view of Greenock Church
Hammond House	1889 (completed)	1990	Sackville; 45°53′58.65″N 64°22′37.16″W	A house built for artist John A. Hammond and now located on the campus of Mount Allison University; an excellent example of the Queen Anne Revival Style in Canadian domestic architecture	
Hartland Covered Bridge	1921 (completed)	1980	Hartland; 46°17′47.77″N 67°31′50.65″W	A wooden covered bridge crossing the Saint John River; the longest existing covered bridge in the world	Entrance to Hartland Bridge
Imperial / Bi-Capitol Theatre	1913 (completed)	1985	Saint John; 45°16′21.82″N 66°3′27.82″W	An early 20th-century theatre facing onto King's Square; a nationally significant example of a theatre built specifically for live performances	Front facade of the Imperial / Bi-Capitol Theatre
La Coupe Dry Dock	1700s (c.) (established)	1933	Aulac; 45.915908°N 64.266962°W	Site may represent 18th-century Acadian construction	La Coupe Dry Dock in 2025
Loyalist House	1817 (completed)	1958	Saint John; 45°16′28.42″N 66°3′40.51″W	An excellent example of New England–style Federal architecture, and representative of the houses built by prosperous United Empire Loyalists; one of the oldest residences in the city and a survivor of the Great Fire, the house was maintained by five generations of the same family until 1959	Rear facade of Loyalist House
Marine Hospital	1831 (completed)	1989	Miramichi; 47°1′20.07″N 65°30′37.22″W	A sandstone building with a domed cupola, overlooking the Miramichi River; the oldest surviving marine hospital in Canada	Front facade of the Marine Hospital
Marysville Cotton Mill	1885 (completed)	1986	Fredericton; 45°58′41.65″N 66°35′19.69″W	A four-storey, red-brick cotton mill building with a central tower; representative of the brick pier mills that were common in the Canadian textile industry	
Marysville Historic District	1840 (c.) (established)	1993	Fredericton; 45°58′44.01″N 66°35′17.44″W	A former industrial community on the banks of the Nashwaak River; a rare surviving example of a 19th-century, single-industry company town with both its plant and company housing intact	
McAdam Railway Station (Canadian Pacific)	1901 (completed)	1976	McAdam; 45°35′20.4″N 67°19′48″W	A stone, Chateau-style railway station and hotel; associated with the period of the rapid growth of the Canadian Pacific Railway and a rare surviving example of a combined station and hotel	The McAdam Railway Station at the top of the railway embankment
Meductic Indian Village / Fort Meductic	1600s (c.)	1924	Lakeland Ridges; 45°35′20.4″N 67°19′48″W	The principal settlement of the Maliseet in the 17th century, and an important fur trading centre; the construction of the Mactaquac Dam in 1968 flooded the site, and the cairn marking the site was moved to nearby Fort Meductic Road	The Meductic church cornerstone - the oldest religious artifact in New Brunswick
Minister's Island	1889 (estate established)	1996	St. Andrews; 45°35′20.4″N 67°19′48″W	The picturesque summer estate and gentleman's farm of William Cornelius Van Horne on a 280-hectare (690-acre) island in Passamaquoddy Bay	The Van Horne mansion on Minister's Island
Minister's Island Pre-contact Sites	1000 (c.) BCE (established)	1978	St. Andrews; 45°35′20.4″N 67°19′48″W	Archaeological sites containing the remains of four houses and a shell midden originating from a coastal winter settlement	
Miscou Island Lighthouse	1856 (completed)	1974	Miscou Island; 48°0′32.4″N 64°29′27.6″W	One of the few remaining wooden, octagonal, tapered lighthouses in Canada; among the oldest in the Gulf of Saint Lawrence region	Miscou Island Lighthouse in the distance
Monument Lefebvre	1856 (completed)	1994	Memramcook; 45°58′45.8″N 64°33′59.98″W	Built in memory of Camille Lefebvre, who founded the first French language institution to confer university degrees in Atlantic Canada; now serves as an Acadian cultural centre	The Monument Lefebvre at the top of a hill
Number 2 Mechanics' Volunteer Company Engine House	1841 (completed)	1995	Saint John; 45°16′24.56″N 66°3′24.61″W	The oldest remaining fire hall in Canada built to house hand-operated pumper fire engines; symbolic of the early phase in fire fighting in Canada when volunteer fire companies were the primary line of defence against fires in Victorian-era cities	Front facade of the Number 2 Mechanics' Volunteer Company Engine House
Old Government House	1828 (completed)	1958	Fredericton; 45°57′56.52″N 66°39′21.36″W	The stone Palladian-style official residence of the Lieutenant Governor; the location of a historic 1866 meeting between Governor Arthur Gordon and Premier Albert James Smith which paved the way for the colony's entry into Confederation	Front facade of Old Government House with circular driveway leading to front door
Ordnance Building	1842 (built)	2015	Saint John; 45.265366°N 66.054256°W	Rare colonial-era military ordnance building, it survived the Great Fire of 1877	
Our Lady of the Assumption Cathedral	1939–40 (built)	2017	Moncton; 46°05′27″N 64°46′54″W	Built as a symbol of the achievements and resilience of Acadians, embodies the final phase of the Acadian renaissance; recounts their history in decorative elements and is built combining styles of Art Deco, Gothic Revival and Romanesque	Our Lady of the Assumption Cathedral, Moncton
Oxbow	1000 BCE (c.) (community established)	1982	Metepenagiag Mi'kmaq Nation; 46°56′19.6″N 65°48′40.18″W	A site where stratified archaeological resources are buried in the silts and gravels of the Little Southwest Miramichi River bank; a unique cultural record of a 3000-year Mi’kmaq community	
Partridge Island Quarantine Station	1830 (established)	1974	Saint John; 45°14′21.2″N 66°3′11.8″W	One of two major quarantine stations in Canada in the 19th century, established to protect the citizenry from contagious diseases carried by passengers and crews of in-coming ships	A Celtic cross erected on Patridge Island to commemorate Irish immigrants who died of typhus after their ocean journey
Prince William Streetscape	1877 (construction after Great Fire)	1981	Saint John; 45°16′16.95″N 66°3′42.59″W	A concentration of architecturally notable late 19th-century public and commercial buildings within a two-block area	The Bank of New Brunswick Building and the Old Post Office on Prince William Street
Rothesay Railway Station (European and North American)	1860 (completed)	1976	Rothesay; 45°23′21.8″N 65°59′57.07″W	A railway station with stationmaster's quarters on the second storey; commemorates the development of railways in the Maritimes and is a good surviving example of a number two standard station designed by the European and North American Railway	Rothesay Station in winter
Saint John City Market	1876 (completed)	1986	Saint John; 45°16′26.11″N 66°3′35.69″W	A rare and notable surviving example of a 19th-century market building, illustrates the development of 19th-century market buildings in Canada; survived the Great Fire of 1877 due to its solid, fire-resistant design	Exterior of the Saint John City Market
Saint John County Court House	1829 (completed)	1974	Saint John; 45°16′25.35″N 66°3′24.65″W	A neoclassical court house typical of early-19th-century, British public buildings in Canada; representative of the judicial system in the province	Exterior of the Saint John County Court House
Seal Cove Smoked Herring Stands	1870 (established)	1995	Grand Manan Island; 44°39′6.76″N 66°50′20.66″W	54 wooden buildings surrounding a cove bounded by breakwaters; a cultural landscape once typical of the Maritimes, but increasingly rare today, and evocative of the Atlantic herring fishery	View of several wooden buildings at Seal Cove at low tide
St. Andrews Blockhouse	1813 (completed)	1962	St Andrews; 45°4′37.51″N 67°3′42.81″W	One of the few surviving Canadian examples of a War of 1812 blockhouse; built by the citizens of St. Andrews to protect the town from American raiders	Exterior view of St. Andrews Blockhouse
St. Andrews Historic District	1783 (town founded)	1962	St Andrews; 45°4′23.37″N 67°2′50.56″W	A grid of sixty blocks comprising the original part of the present town; a fine example of a town in Canada that still reflects an 18th-century British colonial town plan	Intersection of Water and King Streets in St Andrews
St. Anne's Chapel of Ease	1847 (completed)	1989	Fredericton; 45°57′40.01″N 66°38′54.36″W	A small Gothic Revival stone church reflective of the influence of the principles of the Cambridge Camden Society in Canada	St. Anne's Chapel of Ease
Stone Church	1826 (completed)	1989	Saint John; 45°16′34.1″N 66°3′41.67″W	An early Anglican church; one of the earliest examples of this first phase of the Gothic Revival style in Canada, known as Romantic Gothic Revival	The Stone Church, as seen as the view terminus at the top of Wellington Row
St. Luke's Anglican Church	1833 (completed)	1994	Quispamsis; 45°26′38.19″N 65°59′17.33″W	A wooden church that represents one of the best examples of an Anglican church in Canada that reflects the architectural traditions of James Gibbs and Christopher Wren	
St. Paul's United Church (Fredericton)	1886 (completed)	1990	Fredericton; 45°57′35.5″N 66°38′43.38″W	A former Presbyterian, now United, church; it is an excellent example of the High Victorian Gothic Revival style in Canada	
St. Stephen Post Office	1887 (completed)	1983	St. Stephen; 45°11′33.05″N 67°16′37.67″W	A Romanesque Revival building constructed for the local post office, customs offices and internal revenue offices, and having served as the town hall since 1965, it is a fine example of the small urban post offices designed by Thomas Fuller	
Tilley House	1810 (completed)	1965	Arcadia; 45°46′57.77″N 66°8′36.03″W	A clapboard house that was the birthplace and boyhood home of Sir Samuel Leonard Tilley, a Father of Confederation	
Tonge's Island	1678 (established as capital)	1925	Sackville; 45°51′11.18″N 64°16′39.97″W	A settlement established in 1676 by Michel Leneuf de la Vallière, which served as the capital of Acadia from 1678 to 1684	The Missaguash River, with Tonge's Island visible in the distance among a stand of trees
Trinity Church and Rectory	1789 (completed)	1977	Kingston; 45°30′9.45″N 65°58′32.8″W	The oldest surviving Anglican church in New Brunswick and a rare Maritimes example of a church and rectory surviving as a unit	Trinity Church among the trees
William Brydone Jack Observatory	1851 (completed)	1954	Fredericton; 45°56′53.03″N 66°38′26.53″W	A wooden, octagonal tower that was the first astronomical observatory in Canada; was equipped with the best instruments of its day, and helped determine the longitude of places in New Brunswick and correct errors in international boundaries	
Wolastoq (Saint John River)		2011	Section of the Saint John River between Edmundston and the Bay of Fundy; 45°16′0″N 66°4′0″W	A river that played an important role in 10,000 years of Maliseet history and 400 years of European settlement	The Saint John River, or Wolastoq, near Kintore
York County Court House	1858 (completed)	1980	Fredericton; 45°57′39.58″N 66°38′14.82″W	The earliest surviving New Brunswick court house constructed of brick; represents the beginning of a trend towards the widespread use of brick and stone in public buildings in the province; combination of use as a market and court house is unique among surviving Maritime public buildings	A brick building

=== Former National Historic Site ===
Name	Established	Disbanded	Result
Survival of the Acadians National Historic Site	1978	June 5, 1994	Redesignated Monument Lefebvre National Historic Site, and continued as a national park system unit

== See also ==
- History of New Brunswick
- List of historic places in New Brunswick
- Heritage Conservation Act (New Brunswick)
