= Champdoré =

Champdoré Saint-Antoine (formerly)
- Town
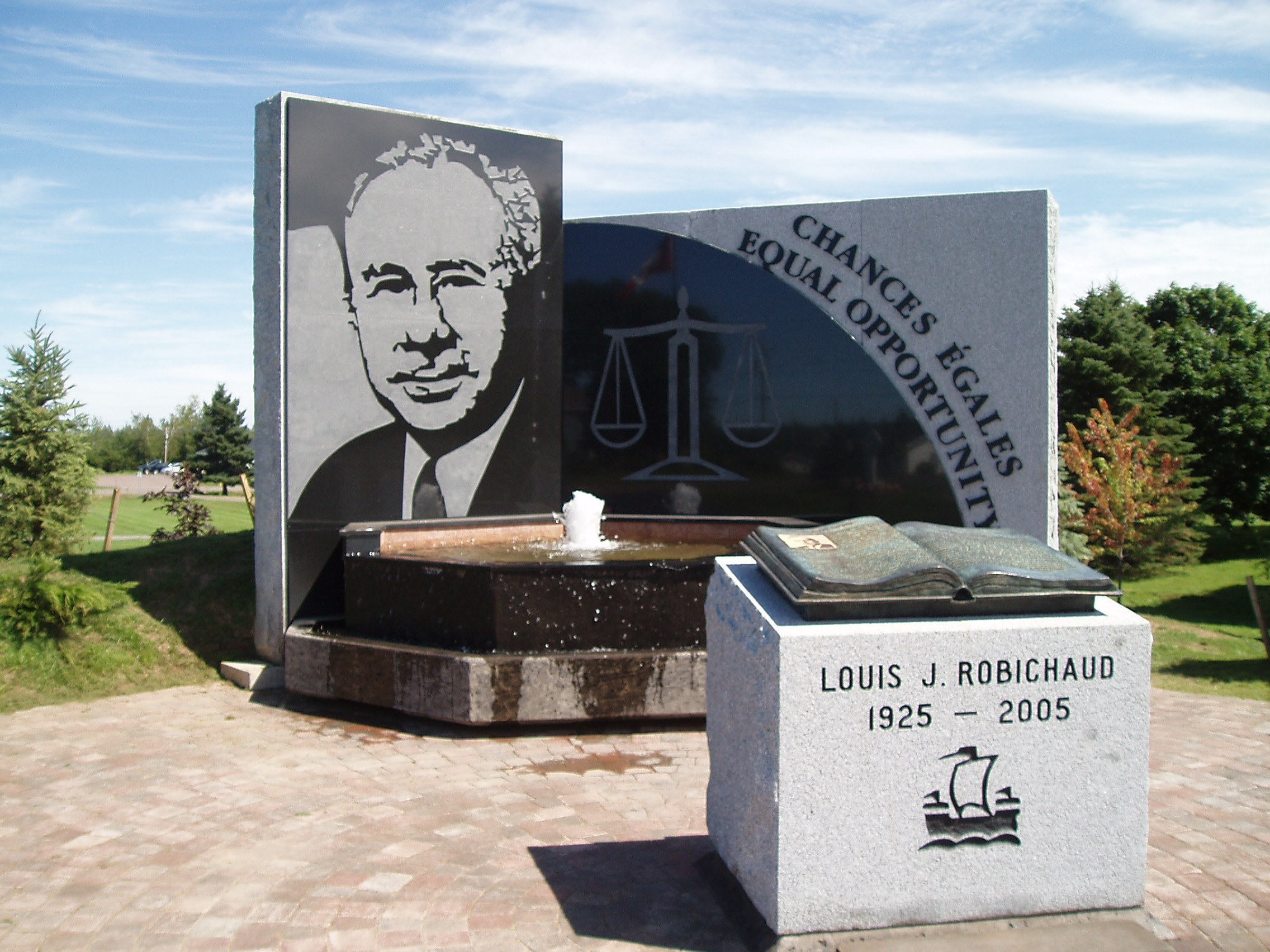
- Louis J. Robichaud memorial

- Logo

- Location within New Brunswick
- Coordinates: 46°21′47″N 64°45′11″W
- Country: Canada
- Province: New Brunswick
- County: Kent County
- Regional service commission: Kent
- Incorporated: January 1, 2023

Government
  - Type: Town council
  - Mayor: Marc Babineau
- Time zone: UTC-4 (AST)
  - Summer (DST): UTC-3 (ADT)
- Area code: 506
- Website: champdorenb.ca

Champdoré (French pronunciation: [ʃɑ̃dɔʁe]) is a town in the Canadian province of New Brunswick. It was formed through the 2023 New Brunswick local governance reforms.

== History ==
Champdoré was incorporated on January 1, 2023 as part of the local governance reforms. It includes the former village of Saint-Antoine and some surrounding unincorporated areas and local service districts, including Sainte-Marie, Saint-Paul, Greater Saint-Antoine, part of Wellington (McKees Mills), and part of Harcourt.

== See also ==
- List of communities in New Brunswick
- List of municipalities in New Brunswick
- Champ-Doré
