= Alnwick Parish, New Brunswick =

Alnwick
- Parish
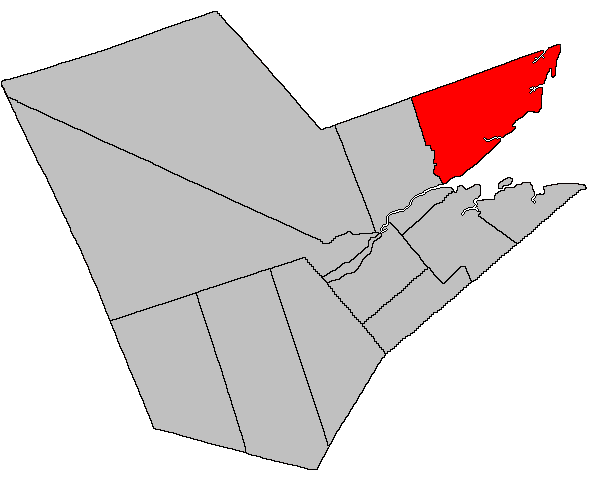
- Location within Northumberland County, New Brunswick
- Coordinates: 47.285°N 65.1425°W
- Country: Canada
- Province: New Brunswick
- County: Northumberland
- Erected: 1786

Area
  - Land: 668.84 km^{2} (258.24 sq mi)

Population (2021)
  - Total: 3,615
  - Density: 5.4/km^{2} (14/sq mi)
  - Change 2016 revised - 2021: ▼0.7%
  - Dwellings: 1,852
- Time zone: UTC-4 (AST)
  - Summer (DST): UTC-3 (ADT)
- Figures do not include portions within the village of Neguac, the Esgenoôpetitj 14 and Tabusintac 9 Indian reserves, and the regional municipality of Tracadie

Alnwick is a geographic parish in Northumberland County, New Brunswick, Canada. (Note: The Territorial Division Act divides the province into 152 parishes, the cities of Saint John and Fredericton, and one town of Grand Falls. The Interpretation Act clarifies that parishes include any local government within their borders.)

For governance purposes it is divided between the village of Neguac, the Indian reserves of Esgenoôpetitj 14 and Tabusintac 9, the incorporated rural community of Alnwick, and the regional municipality of Tracadie. Neguac and Tracadie are members of the Acadian Peninsula Regional Service Commission, while Alnwick is a member of the Greater Miramichi RSC.

Prior to the 2023 governance reform, the rural community of Alnwick was divided between four local service districts: Fair Isle, Oak Point - Bartibog Bridge, Tabusintac, and the parish of Alnwick, which also included the islands that are now part of Neguac.

== Origin of name ==
Alnwick and Newcastle Parishes were erected simultaneously. Alnwick and Newcastle are the county town and largest city of Northumberland County, England. This is probably the origin of the two parishes' names.

== History ==
Alnwick was erected in 1786 as one of the original parishes of the county, with very different boundaries from today. The modern communities of Burnt Church and Bartibog were near or on the southern edge of the parish, which was nearly rectangular and ran west past the Nepisiguit River.

The 1814 reorganisation of Northumberland County's parishes gave Alnwick its modern shape, removing all territory in what's now Gloucester but adding modern Barryville, Oak Point, The Willows, Bartibog Bridge, and Winston.

== Boundaries ==
Alnwick Parish is bounded:

- on the north by the Gloucester County line;
- on the east by the Gulf of Saint Lawrence;
- on the south by Miramichi Bay, Miramichi Inner Bay, and Miramichi River;
- on the west by a line beginning at the mouth of the Bartibog River, then running upriver to the Route 8 bridge, then north (Note: By the magnet of 1850, when declination in the area was between 21º and 22º west of north. The Territorial Division Act clause referring to magnetic direction bearings was omitted in the 1952 and 1973 Revised Statutes.) to the county line;
- including Sheldrake Island, Portage Island, and all islands in front.

=== Evolution of boundaries ===
The 1786 boundaries were a line running due west from the mouth of the Big Tracadie River in the north, a line running due west from the northern tip of Portage Island in the south, and in the west a line running north from the mouth of Cains River in what's now Blackville Parish. Alnwick included most of the modern parish along with parts of Allardville, Bathurst, Newcastle, Northesk, and Saumarez Parishes.

The 1814 reorganisation of Northumberland County's parishes gave Alnwick nearly its modern boundaries, removing all territory in what's now Gloucester County and Newcastle and Northesk Parishes but adding modern Barryville, Oak Point, The Willows, Bartibog Bridge, and Winston. The Newcastle line ran only six miles up the Bartibog River before going north to the county line, probably putting the departure point south of Sproule Road.

In 1850 the western boundary was moved upriver to its current departure point, transferring a strip of territory to Alnwick, most of it wilderness.

== Communities ==
Communities at least partly within the parish. bold indicates an incorporated municipality, Indian reserve, or regional municipality

- Allainville
- Barryville
- B artibog Bridge
- Bayshore
- Breau Road
- Burnt Church
- Cains Point
- Covedell
- Drisdelle Settlement
- **Esgenoôpetitj 14**
- Fairisle
- Gaythorne
- Lagacéville
- Lauvergot
- Lavillette
- **Neguac**
  - Comeau Settlement
  - Lower Neguac
  - Rivière-des-Caches
- New Jersey
- Oak Point
- Price Settlement
- Robichaud Settlement
- Saint-Wilfred
- Stymiest Road
- Tabusintac
- **Tabusintac 9**
- The Willows
- **Regional Municipality of Tracadie**
  - Brantville
  - Pontgravé
  - Rivière-du-Portage
- Village-Saint-Laurent
- Winston
- Wishart Point

== Bodies of water ==
Bodies of water (Note: Not including brooks, ponds or coves.) at least partly in the parish.

- Bartibog River
- Big Eskedelloc River
- Burnt Church River
- Rivière des Caches
- Rivière du Portage
- Little Bartibog River
- Little Eskedelloc River
- Oyster River
- Tabusintac River
- Cowassaget Stream
- Grand Lac
- Gulf of St. Lawrence
- Gammon Bay
- Miramichi Bay
- Neguac Bay
- Tabusintac Bay
- Grand Dune Inlet
- Bass Fishing Channel
- Old Seal Gully
- Old Tabusintac Gully
- Ship Channel
- Tabusintac Gully

== Islands ==
Islands at least partly in the parish.

- Brant Island
- Grand Dune Island
- Hay Island
- McLeods Island
- Old Dans Island
- Portage Island
- Redpine Island
- Sheep Island
- Sheldrake Island

== Other notable areas ==
Parks, historic sites, and other noteworthy places at least partly in the parish.

- Brantville Protected Natural Area
- North Branch Burnt Church River Protected Natural Area
- South Branch Burnt Church River Protected Natural Area
- Tabusintac Lagoon and River Estuary
- Tabusintac Protected Natural Area
- Tabusintac River Protected Natural Area
- Tracadie Military Training Area

== Demographics ==
Parish population total does not include Neguac, the Indian reserves or portion within the Regional Municipality of Tracadie. Revised census figures based on the 2023 local governance reforms have not been released.

=== Population ===
**Population trend**

| Census | Population | Change (%) |
|---|---|---|
| 2016 | 3,640 | ▼3.5% |
| 2011 revision | 3,771 | ▼36.3% |
| 2011 | 5,922 | ▼3.7% |
| 2006 | 6,152 | ▼6.3% |
| 2001 | 6,566 | ▼4.6% |
| 1996 | 6,884 | ▼1.5% |
| 1991 | 6,988 | N/A |

=== Language ===
**Mother tongue (2016)**

| Language | Population | Pct (%) |
|---|---|---|
| French only | 2,645 | 73.3% |
| English only | 865 | 24.0% |
| Other languages | 30 | 0.8% |
| Both English and French | 70 | 1.9% |

== See also ==
- List of parishes in New Brunswick
