= Northesk Parish, New Brunswick =

Northesk
- Parish
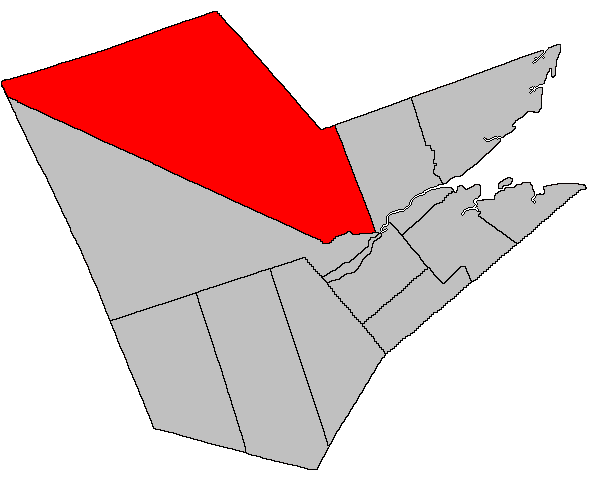
- Location within Northumberland County, New Brunswick
- Coordinates: 47.475°N 66.5°W
- Country: Canada
- Province: New Brunswick
- County: Northumberland
- Erected: 1814

Area
  - Land: 3,346.76 km^{2} (1,292.19 sq mi)

Population (2021)
  - Total: 2,169
  - Density: 0.6/km^{2} (1.6/sq mi)
  - Change 2016-2021: ▼4.2%
  - Dwellings: 1,069
- Time zone: UTC-4 (AST)
  - Summer (DST): UTC-3 (ADT)
- Figures do not include portions within the city of Miramichi and the Big Hole Tract 8, Eel Ground 2, and Red Bank 4 Indian reserves

Northesk is a geographic parish in Northumberland County, New Brunswick, Canada. (Note: The Territorial Division Act divides the province into 152 parishes, the cities of Saint John and Fredericton, and one town of Grand Falls. The Interpretation Act clarifies that parishes include any local government within their borders.)

For governance purposes it is divided between the city of Miramichi; the Indian reserves of Big Hole Tract 8 (North Half), Big Hole Tract 8 (South Half), Eel Ground 2, Indian Point 1, Red Bank 4, and Red Bank 7; the incorporated rural community of Miramichi River Valley, and the Greater Miramichi rural district. The city, rural community, and rural district are all members of the Greater Miramichi Regional Service Commission.

Prior to the 2023 governance reform, the parish was divided between Miramichi, the various Indian reserves, and local service districts of Sunny Corner and the parish of North Esk, which included an area along Route 430 that is now part of Miramichi.

== Origin of name ==
The parish was named in honour of the Earl of Northesk, third in command at the Battle of Trafalgar. Six of the parishes erected simultaneously in Northumberland County in 1814 were named for prominent British military figures.

== History ==
Northesk was erected in 1814 from part of Newcastle Parish and unassigned territory to the west and north. It contained part of Newcastle Parish until 1824, and most of Southesk Parish along with parts of Derby until 1879.

== Boundaries ==
Northesk Parish is bounded:

- on the north by the Gloucester County line;
- on the east by a line beginning on the Gloucester County line about 10.2 kilometres westerly of the Canadian National Railway line, then running south (Note: By the magnet of 1850, when declination in the area was between 20º and 21º west of north. The Territorial Division Act clause referring to magnetic direction bearings was omitted in the 1952 and 1973 Revised Statutes.) to the southeastern corner of a grant to Oliver Willard on the western side of Jones Cove;
- on the south, beginning at Jones Cove and running up the Northwest Miramichi River to the mouth of the Little Southwest Miramichi River, then running north 45º west (Note: By the magnet of 1879, when declination in the area was between 22º and 23º west of north.) to the Victoria County line at a point about 150 metres south-southeast of Route 385;
- on the west by the Victoria County line.

=== Evolution of boundaries ===
When Northesk was erected it had fairly similar boundaries to the combination of modern Northesk and Southesk Parish, although it contained part of the former town of Newcastle, from about the intersection of Newcastle Boulevard and Beaverbrook to Jones Cove; a triangle in its northeastern corner was part of Newcastle Parish.

In 1824 the boundary with Newcastle was moved to Jones Cove and ran more northerly, losing a triangle of land in the south but gaining a triangle of territory from Newcastle.

In 1830 the southern boundary west of Nelson Parish was moved north, removing a strip of territory with the modern Route 108 running through it. The lost area was transferred to Blackville, Blissfield, and Ludlow Parishes.

In 1850 the southern boundary with Nelson Parish was moved north, placing part of Warwick Settlement in Nelson. The boundary was moved back to its original location in 1856.

In 1879 the territory south of the Northwest Miramichi River and a line running northwest from the mouth of the Little Southwest Miramichi River was erected as Southesk Parish. This gave Northesk its modern boundaries.

== Communities ==
Communities at least partly within the parish. bold indicates an incorporated municipality or Indian reserve; italics indicates a name no longer in official use

- Big Hole
- **Big Hole Tract 8 (North Half)**
- **Big Hole Tract 8 (South Half)**
- Boom Road
- Chaplin Island Road
- Curtis Settlement
- Curventon
- **Eel Ground 2**
  - Eel Ground
- Exmoor
- Indian Falls Depot
- **Indian Point 1**
- Lumsden Road
- Maple Glen
- **Miramichi**
- North Esk Boom
- Popple Depot
- **Red Bank 7**
- Sevogle
- Strathadam
- Sunny Corner
- Trout Brook
- Wayerton
- Whitney

== Bodies of water ==
Bodies of water (Note: Not including brooks, ponds or coves.) at least partly within the parish.

- Big Sevogle River
- Little River
- Little Sevogle River
- Little Southwest Miramichi River
  - The Oxbow
- Mamozekel River
- Nepisiguit River
  - Devils Elbow
  - Moose Bogan
  - Nepisiguit Deadwater
- Northwest Miramichi River
- Portage River
- Tomogonops River
- Clearwater Stream
- Little Millstream
- Mullin Stream
- Northwest Millstream
- Hawgee Creek
- Indiantown Creek
- Castor Bogan
- Packsack Lake
- Sole Leather Lake
- more than fifty other officially named lakes

== Islands ==
Islands at least partly within the parish.

- Chaplin Island
- Copps Island
- Exmoor Island
- McHughs Island
- McLaughlin Island
- McNeill Island
- Oldfields Island
- Patsys Island
- Quigley Island
- Shaddick Island
- Three Islands
- Tozers Island

== Other notable places ==
Parks, historic sites, and other noteworthy places at least partly within the parish.

- Bellefond Protected Natural Area
- Big Bald Mountain Protected Natural Area
- Consolidated Mining and Smelting
- East Branch Portage River Protected Natural Area
- Freeze Lakes Protected Natural Area
- Heath Steele Mines
- Mount Carleton Provincial Park
- Mount Carleton Wildlife Management Area
- Mount Denys Protected Natural Area
- Mount Elizabeth Protected Natural Area
- Nepisiguit Protected Natural Area
- Sevogle Airport
- South Branch Big Sevogle River Protected Natural Area
- Stony Brook Protected Natural Area

== Demographics ==
Parish population total does not include Indian reserves and portion within Miramichi

=== Population ===
**Population trend**

| Census | Population | Change (%) |
|---|---|---|
| 2016 | 2,263 | ▼3.0% |
| 2011 | 2,333 | ▼5.9% |
| 2006 | 2,480 | ▼4.8% |
| 2001 | 2,606 | ▼4.6% |
| 1996 | 2,731 | ▼3.4% |
| 1991 | 2,826 | N/A |

=== Language ===
**Mother tongue (2016)**

| Language | Population | Pct (%) |
|---|---|---|
| English only | 2,140 | 94.7% |
| French only | 85 | 3.7% |
| Other languages | 20 | 0.9% |
| Both English and French | 15 | 0.7% |

== See also ==
- List of parishes in New Brunswick
