= Nelson Parish, New Brunswick =

Nelson
- Parish
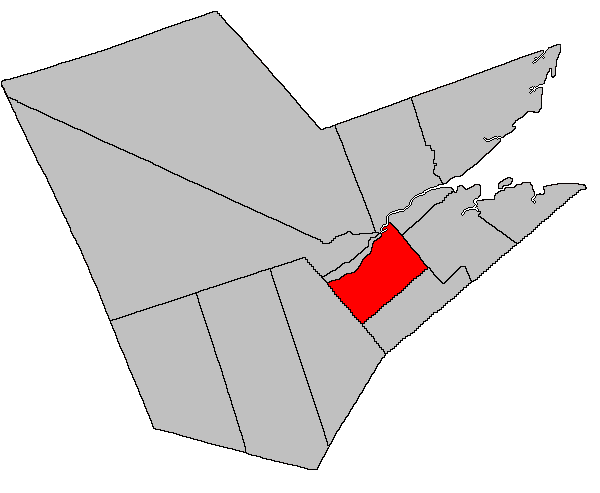
- Location within Northumberland County, New Brunswick
- Coordinates: 46.8525°N 65.69°W
- Country: Canada
- Province: New Brunswick
- County: Northumberland
- Erected: 1814

Area
  - Land: 353.68 km^{2} (136.56 sq mi)

Population (2021)
  - Total: 929
  - Density: 2.6/km^{2} (6.7/sq mi)
  - Change 2016-2021: ▼2.4%
  - Dwellings: 433
- Time zone: UTC-4 (AST)
  - Summer (DST): UTC-3 (ADT)
- Figures do not include portion within the city of Miramichi; Population change reflects revised 2016 figure

Nelson is a geographic parish in Northumberland County, New Brunswick, Canada. (Note: The Territorial Division Act divides the province into 152 parishes, the cities of Saint John and Fredericton, and one town of Grand Falls. The Interpretation Act clarifies that parishes include any local government within their borders.)

For governance purposes it is divided between the city of Miramichi, the village of Nouvelle-Arcadie, the incorporated rural community of Miramichi River Valley, and the Greater Miramichi rural district. All are members of the Greater Miramichi Regional Service Commission except Nouvelle-Arcadie, which is part of the Kent RSC.

Prior to the 2023 governance reform, the parish was divided between Miramichi and the local service district of the parish of Nelson; an area upstream of O'Toole Crescent was part of the LSD.

== Origin of name ==
The parish was probably named in honour of Admiral Nelson.

== History ==
Nelson was erected in 1814 from Newcastle Parish.

Nelson included parts of Chatham and Glenelg Parishes until 1850, most of Derby and parts of Southesk until 1859, and most of Rogersville until 1881.

== Boundaries ==
Nelson Parish is bounded:

- on the north by the Southwest Miramichi River and Miramichi River;
- on the east, beginning at a cove northeasterly of the junction of Rasche Street and St. Patrick's Drive, by a line running southeasterly along the northeastern line of a grant to Thomas McCallum and its prolongation to a point seven miles (11 kilometres) from the Kent County line;
- on the south by a line seven miles from and parallel to the Kent County line;
- on the west, beginning at a point about 2.25 kilometres west of North Lake, by a line running north 22º west (Note: By the magnet of 1814, when declination in the area was between 16º and 17º west of north. The Territorial Division Act clause referring to magnetic direction bearings was omitted in the 1952 and 1973 Revised Statutes.) through the mouth of the Renous River;
- including Barnaby Island in the Southwest Miramichi.

=== Evolution of boundaries ===
When Nelson was erected it included a strip of Chatham and Glenelg Parishes that ran from the Miramichi River to the modern Kent County line, which included the Douglasfield and Chatham Head areas. The boundary with Northesk Parish was a line running south 68º west from modern Wilsons Point, which cuts repeatedly through the modern line between Derby and Southesk Parishes.

In 1850 the boundary with Chatham and Glenelg was moved west to its present position. The Northesk boundary was moved north to a line running west from Wilsons Point by the magnet of 1850.

In 1856 the boundary with Northesk Parish was changed back to the pre-1850 line.

In 1859 all of Nelson north of the Southwest Miramichi River, along with Beaubears Island, was erected as Derby Parish.

In 1881 all of Nelson within seven miles of the Kent County line was erected as Rogersville Parish.

== Communities ==
Communities at least partly within the parish. bold indicates an incorporated municipality; italics indicate a name no longer in official use

- Barnaby River
- Chelmsford
- Doyles Brook
- Kirkwood
- Lower Barnaby
- McKinleyville
- Passmore
- **Renous 12**
- Semiwagan Ridge
- Upper Barnaby
- **Miramichi**
  - Craigville
  - Ivory Road
  - Nelson-Miramichi
  - Nowlanville
- **Miramichi**
  - Reynolds
  - South Nelson
  - South Nelson Road

== Bodies of water ==
Bodies of water (Note: Not including brooks, ponds or coves.) at least partly within the parish.

- Barnaby River
- Southwest Miramichi River
- Semiwagan Stream
  - Semiwagan Deadwater

== Islands ==
Islands at least partly within the parish.

- Barnaby Island
- Macs Lake

== Other notable places ==
Parks, historic sites, and other noteworthy places at least partly within the parish.

- Semiwagan Meadows Protected Natural Area

== Demographics ==
Parish population total does not include Renous 12 Indian reserve or portion in Miramichi

=== Population ===
Population trend

Census	Population	Change (%)
2016	957	▲2.4%
2011	935	▲14.9%
2006	814	▼20.3%
2001	1,021	▲2.7%
1996	994	Steady
1991	994	N/A

=== Language ===
Mother tongue (2016)

Language	Population	Pct (%)
English only	895	93.7%
French only	55	5.8%
Other languages	0	0%
Both English and French	5	0.5%

== See also ==
- List of parishes in New Brunswick
