= Rogersville Parish, New Brunswick =

Rogersville
- Parish
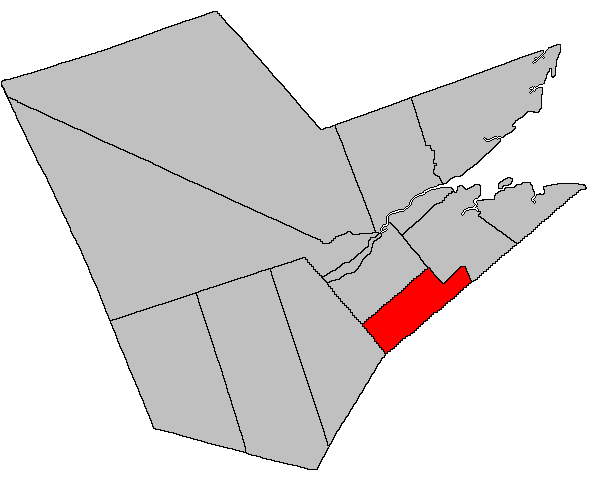
- Location within Northumberland County, New Brunswick
- Coordinates: 46.775555°N 65.48°W
- Country: Canada
- Province: New Brunswick
- County: Northumberland
- Erected: 1881

Area
  - Land: 326.27 km^{2} (125.97 sq mi)

Population (2021)
  - Total: 1,072
  - Density: 3.3/km^{2} (8.5/sq mi)
  - Change 2016-2021: ▼2.7%
  - Dwellings: 538
- Time zone: UTC-4 (AST)
  - Summer (DST): UTC-3 (ADT)
- Figures do not include portion within the village of Rogersville

Rogersville (originally Rogerville) is a geographic parish in Northumberland County, New Brunswick, Canada. (Note: The Territorial Division Act divides the province into 152 parishes, the cities of Saint John and Fredericton, and one town of Grand Falls. The Interpretation Act clarifies that parishes include any local government within their borders.)

For governance purposes it is divided between the village of Nouvelle-Arcadie and the Greater Miramichi rural district, which are members of the Kent Regional Service Commission and Greater Miramichi RSC respectively.

Prior to the 2023 governance reform, the parish was divided between the village of Rogersville and the local service districts of Collette and the parish of Rogersville. Rogersville and Collette became part of Nouvelle-Arcadie while the parish LSD was split between the new village and the rural district.

== Origin of name ==
The parish was named in honour of James Rogers, then Bishop of Chatham.

== History ==
Rogersville was erected in 1881 from Nelson Parish.

The parish was expanded northeastward in 1900 to take in the Rosaireville area of Glenelg Parish.

== Boundaries ==
Rogersville Parish is bounded:

- on the northwest, by a line beginning at a point about 2.25 kilometres west of North Lake and seven miles (11 kilometres) from the Kent County line, then running northeasterly parallel to the county line at a distance of seven miles until it strikes the southeasterly prolongation of the northeastern line of a grant to Thomas McCallum, which begins at a cove northeasterly of the junction of Rasche Street and St. Patrick's Drive in Miramichi, then southeasterly along the McCallum prolongation until it strikes the northern line of a grant to John Townley at the mouth of Big Hovel Brook, about 1.8 kilometres north of Route 440 and about 2.6 kilometres east of East Collette Villa Laplatte Road, then northeasterly along the Townley grant to the Bay du Vin River, then downstream to the eastern line of the Richard Settlement grants, which run along a north-south section of Route 440 north of Richard-Village, then southeasterly along the tier and its prolongation to the county line;
- on the southeast by the county line;
- on the southwest by a line beginning on the county line at a point about 900 metres southwest of Despres Lake, then running north 22º west (Note: By the magnet of 1814, when declination in the area was between 16º and 17º west of north. The Territorial Division Act clause referring to magnetic direction bearings was omitted in the 1952 and 1973 Revised Statutes.) through the mouth of the Renous River.

=== Evolution of boundaries ===
When Rogersville was erected it included all of Nelson Parish within seven miles (11 kilometres) of the Kent County line.

In 1900 all of Glenelg Parish south of the Bay du Vin River as far east as the tier of grants along Route 440 was transferred to Rogersville, adding Rosaireville and the Richard Settlement east of it.

== Communities ==
Communities at least partly within the parish. bold indicates an incorporated municipality; italics indicate a name no longer in official use

- Collette
- East Collette
- Lakeland
- Marcelville
- Murray Settlement
- North Rogersville
- Pleasant Ridge
- **Rogersville**
- Rosaireville
- Sapin-Court
- Shediac Ridge
- Vienneau
- West Collette
- Young Ridge

== Bodies of water ==
Bodies of water (Note: Not including brooks, ponds or coves.) at least partly within the parish.

- Barnaby River
- Bay du Vin River
- Despres Lake
- North Lake
- North Branch Lake

== Other notable places ==
Parks, historic sites, and other noteworthy places at least partly within the parish.

- West Collette Wildlife Management Area

== Demographics ==
Parish population total does not include portion within the village of Rogersville

=== Population ===
**Population trend**

| Census | Population | Change (%) |
|---|---|---|
| 2016 | 1,102 | ▼9.2% |
| 2011 | 1,213 | ▼2.7% |
| 2006 | 1,247 | ▼8.0% |
| 2001 | 1,356 | ▼5.0% |
| 1996 | 1,427 | ▼2.7% |
| 1991 | 1,466 | N/A |

=== Language ===
**Mother tongue (2016)**

| Language | Population | Pct (%) |
|---|---|---|
| French only | 925 | 83.7% |
| English only | 155 | 14.0% |
| Both English and French | 15 | 1.4% |
| Other languages | 10 | 0.9% |

== See also ==
- List of parishes in New Brunswick
