= Pitre =

Pitre is a surname found amongst the original Acadian settlers in Canada. The progenitor of this Acadian family was one Jean Pitre, b: Abt. 1636; d: Abt. 1689 Port Royal, Acadia. Jean Pitre arrived in Port Royal, Acadia, around 1659 during the English occupation of Acadia from 1654-1667. Around 1664, he married Marie Pesselet, the daughter of Isaac Pesselet and Barbe Bajolet. They had nine children: Marie (1666), Catherine (1668), Claude (1670), Marc (1674), Pierre (1677), Jean (1680), Francois (1682), Marguerite (1684), Jeanne (1686). The first Jean Pitre was a "taillandier" (maker of tools and implements). His widow remarried François Robin.

In the Declarations of Belle-Ile-en-Mer, his grandson claimed Jean Pitre's origin as being Flemish. The surname's pronunciation is not clear. It can vary from the official French-accent with (peter). To the English version of (pye-ter) and (peetree), other common pronunciations are (pit) and (pete).

The Pitre surname now extends through the Canadian provinces of Ontario, Quebec, Nova Scotia, New Brunswick, and Prince Edward Island, as well as many American border states; and an overwhelmingly-large colossal Cajun French presence in the U.S. state of Louisiana.

However, Pitres of French ancestry also migrated to Puerto Rico. The first documented Pitres were two brothers (Marcellino Pitre = Martin Pitre, Saturnino Pitre = Francisco Pitre) who settled and according to the Royal Decree of Graces of 1815, "Those who immigrated to Puerto Rico were given free land and a "Letter of Domicile" with the condition that they swore loyalty to the Spanish Crown and allegiance to the Roman Catholic Church. After residing in the island for five years the settlers were granted a "Letter of Naturalization" which made them Spanish subjects."

Approximately nine thousand people share this surname. Famous Pitres include actress Louise Pitre, who is best known for her role as Donna Sheridan in the ABBA-themed musical Mamma Mia!, earning her a 2002 Tony Award nomination; Cajun music pioneer Austin Pitre; heavy metal musician Audie Pitre, Hall of Fame ice hockey player Didier Pitre; filmmaker Glen Pitre and his younger brother, former Louisiana State Representative Loulan Pitre, Jr., who represented a district in Lafourche Parish, where both were born.

Pitre is one of the many common surnames among the Cajun French ethnicity of Louisiana, along with Guidry and Trahan, with the most common being Fontenot.

== Notable people called Pitre ==
- Audie Pitre (1970–1997), bassist for Louisiana extreme metal band Acid Bath
- Austin Pitre (1918–1981), Cajun music pioneer
- Christian Pitre (born 1983), American actress
- Didier Pitre (1883–1934), Canadian professional ice hockey forward
- Glen Pitre (born 1955), American screenwriter and film director
- John Pitre (born 1985), State Farm Agent in San Antonio, TX
- Jalen Pitre (born 1999), American football player
- John Pitre (born 1942), American visionary art painter based in Hawaii
- Jonathan Pitre (2000–2018), Canadian sufferer, and awareness champion, of the rare condition recessive dystrophic epidermolysis bullosa (RDEB)
- Joseph Pitre (born 1946), American politician
- Louise Pitre (born 1957), actress in musical theatre on Broadway and in Canada
- Loulan Pitre, Jr. (born 1961), Louisiana lawyer and politician
- Michael Pitre (born 1987), American football coach

== See also ==
- Pointe-à-Pitre, arrondissement on the island of Guadeloupe
  - Pointe-à-Pitre 1st Canton
  - Pointe-à-Pitre 2nd Canton
  - Pointe-à-Pitre 3rd Canton
  - Pointe-à-Pitre International Airport
