= Rogersville, New Brunswick =

Rogersville
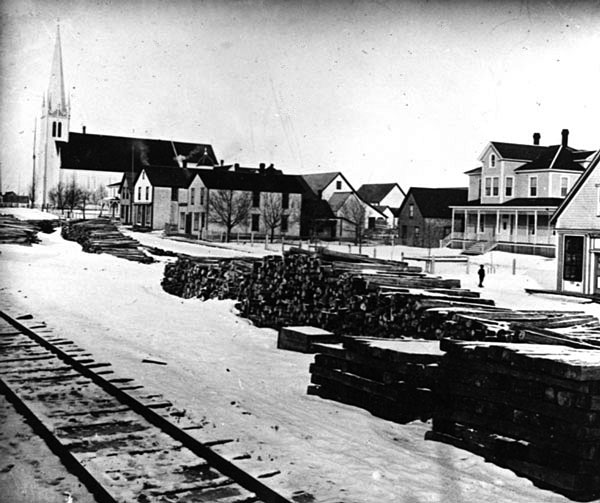
- Rogersville in 1910

- Location within New Brunswick
- Coordinates: 46.73472°N 65.42938°W
- Country: Canada
- Province: New Brunswick
- County: Northumberland County
- Municipality: Nouvelle-Arcadie
- incorporated: November 9, 1966

Area
  - Land: 7.19 km^{2} (2.78 sq mi)

Population (2021)
  - Total: 1,193
  - Density: 165.9/km^{2} (430/sq mi)
  - Change (2016–21): ▲2.3%
- Time zone: UTC−4 (AST)
  - Summer (DST): UTC−3 (ADT)
- Area code: 506

Rogersville is a former village in Northumberland County, New Brunswick, built around the Intersection of New Brunswick Route 126 and New Brunswick Route 440. It was an incorporated village until the end of 2022 and is now part of the village of Nouvelle-Arcadie.

== History ==
The village is named in honour of the Roman Catholic Bishop, the Most Reverend James Rogers, late Bishop of Chatham, New Brunswick. Rogersville is the home of two Trappist (Order of Cistercians of the Strict Observance) monasteries, Notre-Dame de l'Assomption Abbey (Our Lady of the Assumption Abbey for women) and Notre Dame du Calvaire Abbey (Our Lady of Calvary Abbey for men).

It is also the burial place of the man considered the Father of Modern Acadia—(Bishop) Monseigneur Marcel-Francois Richard, and the site of a monument containing his sarcophagus.

On 1 January 2023, Rogersville annexed all or part of seven local service districts to form the new village of Nouvelle-Arcadie. The community's name remains in official use.

== Present day ==
It is served by Via Rail's train the Ocean which stops at the Rogersville railway station.

== Demographics ==
In the 2021 Census of Population conducted by Statistics Canada, Rogersville had a population of 1,193 living in 544 of its 576 total private dwellings, a change of 2.3% from its 2016 population of 1,166. With a land area of 7.19 km^{2} (2.78 sq mi), it had a population density of 165.9/km^{2} (429.7/sq mi) in 2021.

Population trend

Census	Population	Change (%)
2016	1,166	▼0.3%
2011	1,170	▲0.4%
2006	1,165	▼6.7%
2001	1,248	▼6.6%
1996	1,336	N/A

Income (2015)

Income type	By CAD
Per capita income	$23,440
Median Household Income	$40,021
Median Family Income	$56,832

Mother tongue (2016)

Language	Population	Pct (%)
French	970	90.2%
English	90	8.4%
English and French	15	1.4%
Other languages	0	0%

== Places of note ==
- Co-Op store
- Ocean Spray Cranberry Fields

== Border communities ==
- Acadie Siding
- Pleasant Ridge
- Collette
- Shediac Ridge
- Saint-Athanase
- Saint-Pierre
- Sapin-Court
- Young Ridge
- Rosaireville

== See also ==
- List of communities in New Brunswick
