= New Brunswick Route 118 =

Highway in New Brunswick

Route 118

Route information
- Maintained by New Brunswick Department of Transportation
- Length: 40.12 km (24.93 mi)
- Existed: 1965.–present

Major junctions
- North end: Route 126 in Miramichi
- South end: Route 8 in Miramichi River Valley

Location
- Country: Canada
- Province: New Brunswick
- Major cities: Miramichi, South Nelson

Highway system
- Provincial highways in New Brunswick; Former routes
← Route 117	→ Route 119

Route 118 is a north–south provincial highway in the Canadian province of New Brunswick. The road runs from Route 126 intersection in Miramichi. The road has a length of approximately 40 kilometres, and services small, otherwise isolated rural communities. In these areas, the highway is often unofficially referred to as "Main Street." The road parallels the Miramichi River as well as Route 108 and later Route 8 directly to the North side of the river. The highway starts in Miramichi as Islandview Drive. The Highway starts next to Beaubears Island later passing Barnaby Island and lastly Doctors Island. In Miramichi River Valley, the Highway changes to Colonial Drive and lastly Campbell Road.

== Intersecting routes ==
- Route 126 in Miramichi
- Route 8 in Miramichi River Valley

== River crossings ==
- Passing Bridge in Nelson Junction
- Barnaby River - Kirkwood
- Passing Bridge in Renous-Quarryville
- Southwest Miramichi River - Miramichi River Valley

== Communities along the Route ==
- Nelson Junction
- Kirkwood
- Chelmsford
- McKinleyville
- Doyles Brook
- White Rapids
- Grays Rapids
- Coughlan
- Miramichi River Valley

== See also ==
- List of New Brunswick provincial highways
