= Galant (name) =

Galant is a surname. Notable people with the surname include:

- Adam Galant (1954–2025), Polish hurdler
- Ilya Galant (1867–1941), Russian historian
- Jacqueline Galant (born 1974), Belgian politician
- Martyna Galant (born 1995), Polish athlete
- Rashaad Galant (1947–2014), South African cricketer
- Yoav Galant (born 1958), Israeli general and politician

== See also ==
- Gallant (surname)
