= List of shipwrecks in October 1826 =

The list of shipwrecks in October 1826 includes some ships sunk, wrecked or otherwise lost during October 1826.

== 1 October ==
List of shipwrecks: 1 October 1826
Ship	State	Description
Eliza	United Kingdom	The ship was abandoned in the Atlantic Ocean. Her crew were rescued by Franklin (United Kingdom.

== 2 October ==
List of shipwrecks: 2 October 1826
Ship	State	Description
Alexander	United Kingdom	The ship ran aground on the St. Nicholas Sand, in the North Sea.
Granicus	United Kingdom	The ship capsized at Quebec City, Lower Canada, British North America. She was righted the next day.
Hope	United Kingdom	The ship was wrecked on the coast of County Donegal. Her crew were rescued. She was on a voyage from Saint Vincent to Greenock, Renfrewshire.
Oxford	United Kingdom	The ship was driven ashore at Sheldrake Island, New Brunswick, British North America.

== 4 October ==
List of shipwrecks: 4 October 1826
Ship	State	Description
Cora	(United Kingdom of Great Britain and Ireland) Jersey	The ship was wrecked on a reef off Barbados. She was on a voyage from Ceará, Brazil to Gibraltar.
Cyrus	United Kingdom	The ship was sighted on this date whilst on a voyage from Arkhangelsk, Russia to Hull, Yorkshire of London. No further trace, presumed foundered with the loss of all hands.

== 7 October ==
List of shipwrecks: 7 October 1826
Ship	State	Description
Waveney	United Kingdom	The ship was wrecked near Belfast, County Antrim. She was on a voyage from Liverpool, Lancashire, to Galway.

== 8 October ==
List of shipwrecks: 8 October 1826
Ship	State	Description
Joseph and Jane	United Kingdom	The ship was wrecked on Skagen, Denmark with the loss of two of her crew. She was on a voyage from Danzig to London. Joseph & Jane later floated off and was taken in to Aalbeck, Denmark.
Selina	United Kingdom	The ship capsized and sank at Portaferry, County Down.

== 9 October ==
List of shipwrecks: 9 October 1826
Ship	State	Description
Catherine Toole	United Kingdom	The ship was wrecked on South Ronaldsay, Orkney Islands.
Four Sisters	United Kingdom	The ship capsized and sank off Milford Haven, Pembrokeshire. She was later refloated and taken in to Milford Haven.
Fowler	United Kingdom	The ship departed from Riga, Russia. No further trace, presumed foundered with the loss of all hands.
Frau Anna Margaretta	Duchy of Holstein	The ship sprang a leak in the North Sea and was abandoned. She was on a voyage from Flensburg to Hull, Yorkshire, United Kingdom.
Jane	United Kingdom	The ship was wrecked near Bude, Cornwall. All on board were rescued. She was on a voyage from Cork to Neath, Glamorgan.
Selina	United Kingdom	The ship capsized and sank at Portaferry, County Down.

== 11 October ==
List of shipwrecks: 11 October 1826
Ship	State	Description
Favourite	United Kingdom	The ship was driven ashore and damaged at Liverpool, Lancashire. She was on a voyage from Cork to Liverpool. Favourite was refloated on 16 October and taken in to Liverpool.

== 14 October ==
List of shipwrecks: 14 October 1826
Ship	State	Description
Bertha	Russia	The ship was driven ashore on Saaremaa. She was on a voyage from Bordeaux, Gironde, France to Saint Petersburg.
Charles	United Kingdom	The ship was driven ashore in Riga Bay. She was on a voyage from Riga, Russia to Antwerp, Netherlands.
General Elliot	United Kingdom	The ship was driven ashore in Riga Bay. Her crew were rescued. She was on a voyage from Riga to London.
Gref	Norway	The brig was lost in the Vlie. Her crew were rescued.

== 16 October ==
List of shipwrecks: 16 October 1826
Ship	State	Description
Aurora	United Kingdom	The ship was wrecked on Saaremaa, Russia. She was on a voyage from Liverpool, Lancashire to Riga, Russia.
Miriam & Jane	United Kingdom	The ship capsized at Quebec City, Lower Canada, British North America and was severely damaged.

== 17 October ==
List of shipwrecks: 17 October 1826
Ship	State	Description
Catherine	United Kingdom	The ship was wrecked in the Pentland Skerries, Orkney Islands. Her crew were rescued. She was on a voyage from Belfast, County Antrim to Riga, Russia.
Waveney	United Kingdom	The ship was wrecked in Cushendon Bay. She was on a voyage from Liverpool, Lancashire to Galway.

== 19 October ==
List of shipwrecks: 19 October 1826
Ship	State	Description
Eliza	United Kingdom	The brig was driven ashore and wrecked at Peterhead, Aberdeenshire. Her crew were rescued. She was on a voyage from Peterhead to Fraserburgh, Aberdeenshire.
Sarah and Mary	United Kingdom	The ship was lost on the Mouse Sand, in the North Sea off the coast of Essex. She was on a voyage from Boston, Lincolnshire to London.

== 20 October ==
List of shipwrecks: 20 October 1826
Ship	State	Description
Eliza	United Kingdom	The ship sprang a leak and was abandoned in the North Sea 60 nautical miles (110 km) east of Cromer, Norfolk with the loss of two of her crew. She was on a voyage from Saint Petersburg, Russia to Liverpool, Lancashire.
Estafette	Prussia	The ship was wrecked on the Lemon Sand, in the Thames Estuary. She was on a voyage from Memel to London, United Kingdom.
Favourite	United Kingdom	The ship foundered off Whitehaven, Cumberland. Her crew survived. She was on a voyage from Whitehaven to Cardiff, Glamorgan.
Frederica Sophia	Sweden	The ship foundered in the Atlantic Ocean off the coast of Portugal. Her crew were rescued.
Mary	United Kingdom	The ship was abandoned in the Atlantic Ocean. she was on a voyage from Quebec City, Lower Canada, British North America to London.

== 21 October ==
List of shipwrecks: 21 October 1826
Ship	State	Description
Nicolai	(Russian Empire) Grand Duchy of Finland	The ship was driven ashore on the Fin Grundelsand, in the Baltic Sea. She was on a voyage from Gamla Carleby to London, United Kingdom. Nicolai was later refloated and taken in to Öregrund, Sweden for repairs.

== 22 October ==
List of shipwrecks: 22 October 1826
Ship	State	Description
Britannia	United Kingdom	The ship struck a rock and sank in St Helena Bay. She was on a voyage from London to Madeira and Bombay, India.
Elmira	United States	The ship was driven ashore at Martha's Vineyard, Massachusetts. She was on a voyage from Saint Vincent to Bath, Maine.
Wilhelmina	Prussia	The ship was driven ashore at Höganäs, Sweden. She was on a voyage from Hull, Yorkshire to Memel. Wilhelmina was later refloated and put into Copenhagen, Denmark for repairs.

== 24 October ==
List of shipwrecks: 24 October 1826
Ship	State	Description
Mayflower	United Kingdom	The ship was wrecked on the Stotfield Skerries, in the North Sea off Nairn. Her crew were rescued. She was on a voyage from Aberdeen to Portsoy, Aberdeenshire.

== 25 October ==
List of shipwrecks: 25 October 1826
Ship	State	Description
Aid	United Kingdom	The ship was driven ashore and damaged at "Hettross", Sweden. She was relfloated and put into Karlskrona for repairs.
Eliza	United Kingdom	The ship foundered in the North Sea off Montrose, Forfarshire. Her crew were rescued.
Squirrel	United Kingdom	The ship ran aground on the Stoney Binks, in the North Sea off the mouth of the Humber. She was consequently beached at Grimsby, Lincolnshire.
Petit Henri	France	The ship was wrecked on the Whale Rocs, off the Île de Ré, Charente Maritime. She was on a voyage from Bordeaux, Gironde to St. Jago de Cuba, Cuba.
Talbot	United Kingdom	The paddle steamer was driven ashore and damaged at Boulogne, Pas-de-Calais, France. All on board were rescued. She was on a voyage from Dover, Kent to Boulogne. Talbot was later refloated and taken in to Boulogne.

== 26 October ==
List of shipwrecks: 26 October 1826
Ship	State	Description
Mary Jane	United Kingdom	The ship was driven ashore and wrecked at St. Ann's Bay, Lower Canada, British North America. She was on a voyage from Demerara to Quebec City, Lower Canada.
Rambler	United Kingdom	The ship was driven ashore and wrecked near Lough Foyle. Her crew were rescued. She was on a voyage from Belfast, County Antrim to Londonderry.

== 27 October ==
List of shipwrecks: 27 October 1826
Ship	State	Description
Alfred	United Kingdom	The ship foundered in the Mediterranean Sea. Her crew were rescued by a Sicilian vessel. She was on a voyage from Licata, Sicily to Belfast, County Antrim and the Clyde.
Peggy	United Kingdom	The ship foundered off Cape Breton Island, Nova Scotia, British North America. She was on a voyage from Bristol, Gloucestershire to Quebec City, Lower Canada, British North America.

== 28 October ==
List of shipwrecks: 28 October 1826
Ship	State	Description
Alfred	United Kingdom	The ship was driven ashore and wrecked on the coast of Sardinia. Her crew were rescued by L'Aurora ( Sicilian Navy). She was on a voyage from Licata, Sicily to Belfast, County Antrim.
Gezelschap	Netherlands	The ship was lost off Rottumeroog, Groningen. She was on a voyage from Riga, Russia to Amsterdam, North Holland.

== 29 October ==
List of shipwrecks: 29 October 1826
Ship	State	Description
Betsey	United Kingdom	The trow was in collision with a sloop in the River Severn at Newnham, Gloucestershire and foundered. Her crew were rescued.
Caroline	United Kingdom	The ship was wrecked on the Atin Shoals, off the coast of Brazil. Her crew were rescued. She was on a voyage from Liverpool, Lancashire to Maranhão.
Jacobus	Norway	The ship sprang a leak in the North Sea and foundered. She was on a voyage from London, United Kingdom, to Landvik.

== 30 October ==
List of shipwrecks: 30 October 1826
Ship	State	Description
Cherub	United Kingdom	The ship was driven ashore on Long Island, New York, United States. All on board, at least 68 people, were rescued. She was on a voyage from Saint John, New Brunswick, British North America to New York City.
Fly	United Kingdom	The sloop capsized in a squall off Bardsey Island, Pembrokeshire. Her three crew survived. She was on a voyage from Liverpool, Lancashire to Fishguard, Pembrokeshire.

== 31 October ==
List of shipwrecks: 31 October 1826
Ship	State	Description
Dale	United Kingdom	The ship was driven ashore at Hoylake, Lancashire. She was on a voyage from Quebec City, Lower Canada, British North America to Liverpool, Lancashire. Dale was refloated, but subsequently came ashore again at Liverpool.
Four Brothers	United Kingdom	The ship foundered off Padstow, Cornwall. Her crew were rescued. She was on a voyage from Portreath, Cornwall to Neath, Glamorgan.
Hibernia	United Kingdom	The ship was driven ashore and wrecked at Long Beach, New Jersey, United States. She was on a voyage from Dublin to New York, United States.
Maid of the Mill	United Kingdom	The sloop was abandoned in the Irish Sea off Lambay Island, County Dublin. She was on a voyage from Belfast, County Antrim to Dundalk, County Louth. Maid of the Mill was towed in to Dunmore East, County Waterford on 14 November.
Unity	United Kingdom	The ship ran aground on Saltholm, Denmark and was damaged. She was on a voyage from Bridgwater, Somerset to a Baltic port.

== Unknown date ==
List of shipwrecks: Unknown date in October 1826
Ship	State	Description
Anna Sophia	Netherlands	The ship foundered near Bergen, Norway. She was on a voyage from Bergen to Dordrecht, South Holland.
Antoinette	Russia	The ship was wrecked on Aspö, Sweden. She was on a voyage from Saint Petersburg to Livorno, Grand Duchy of Tuscany.
Beresina	Russia	The ship foundered off Cape Spartivento, Sardinia whilst on a voyage from Odesa to Livorno, Grand Duchy of Tuscany via Constantinople, Ottoman Empire. All on board survived.
Catharine	United Kingdom	The ship was wrecked on "Western Cross Island". She was on a voyage from Bristol, Gloucestershire to St. Andrew, New Brunswick, British North America.
Charles	France	The ship was wrecked on Cape Breton in late October. She was on a voyage from Marseille, Bouches-du-Rhône, to San Sebastián, Spain.
Concordia	Netherlands	The ship was wrecked on the Thistle Rocks, off the coast of Sweden in mid-October with the loss of all hands. She was on a voyage from Saint Petersburg to Antwerp.
Eliza & Margaret	United Kingdom	The ship was driven ashore on Great Saltee, County Wexford. She was on a voyage from Liverpool, Lancashire to Limerick.
Greyhound	United States	The ship was wrecked on the Dry Tortugas. Her crew were rescued. She was on a voyage from Mobile, Alabama to Bordeaux, Gironde, France.
Hibernia	United Kingdom	The ship was driven ashore and wrecked on the coast of New Jersey, United States, in late October. She was on a voyage from Dublin to New York, United States.
Mary	United Kingdom	The ship was driven ashore near Cromer, Norfolk. She was on a voyage from Saint Petersburg, Russia to London. Mary was refloated on 17 October and taken in to Blakeney, Norfolk.
Mary and Ann	United Kingdom	The brig was wrecked on the Theddlethorpe Knowl, in the North Sea off the coast of Lincolnshire.
Prins Adolf	Netherlands	The ship was wrecked on Vargö, Sweden. She was on a voyage from Amsterdam, North Holland to a Baltic port.
St. Nicholas	Netherlands	The ship foundered near Livorno, Grand Duchy of Tuscany. She was later refloated.
Twee Gebroeders	Hamburg	The ship foundered in the North Sea off Norden, Kingdom of Hanover. Her crew were rescued. She was on a voyage from Hamburg to Nantes, Loire-Inférieure, France.
William	United States	The brig was abandoned in the Atlantic Ocean.
