= Gallantry =

Gallantry may refer to:

- military courage or bravery
- Chivalry
- Warrior ethos
- Knightly Piety
- the quality of being Galant, an ideal of upper-class grandiose or high living and refined merriment that arose in the Baroque period
- Proper behaviour in upper-class social environments, especially during the early modern period, see courtly manner, adoration, gracious hospitality, Courtesy, pious and courtly love
- Gallantry (opera), a one-act opera by composer Douglas Moore

== See also ==
- Gallant (disambiguation)
