= Williamstown, New Brunswick =

Coordinates: 46.925942°N 65.709014°W

Williamstown is a community in the Canadian province of New Brunswick. It is located in Northumberland County, 6 km north of Millerton.

== See also ==
- List of communities in New Brunswick
