= Newcastle Parish, New Brunswick =

Newcastle
- Parish
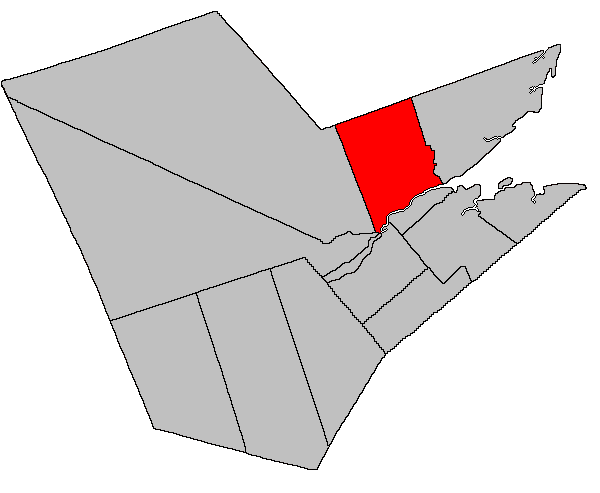
- Location within Northumberland County, New Brunswick
- Coordinates: 47.0°N 65.57°W
- Country: Canada
- Province: New Brunswick
- County: Northumberland
- Erected: 1786

Area
  - Land: 578.70 km^{2} (223.44 sq mi)

Population (2021)
  - Total: 1,149
  - Density: 2/km^{2} (5.2/sq mi)
  - Change 2016-2021: ▲1.1%
  - Dwellings: 529
- Time zone: UTC-4 (AST)
  - Summer (DST): UTC-3 (ADT)
- Figures do not include portions within the city of Miramichi and the Eel Ground 2 Indian reserve

Newcastle is a geographic parish in Northumberland County, New Brunswick, Canada. (Note: The Territorial Division Act divides the province into 152 parishes, the cities of Saint John and Fredericton, and one town of Grand Falls. The Interpretation Act clarifies that parishes include any local government within their borders.)

For governance purposes it is divided between the city of Miramichi and the Greater Miramichi rural district, with small border areas belonging to the incorporated rural communities of Alnwick (Bartibog area) and Miramichi River Valley (Chaplin Island Road), all of which are members of the Greater Miramichi Regional Service Commission, and the Eel Ground 2 and Metepenagiag Uta'nk Indian reserves, which are not part of the RSC.

Prior to the 2023 governance reform, the parish was divided between Miramichi, the Indian reserves, and the local service districts of Lower Newcastle-Russellville and the parish of Newcastle.

== Origin of name ==
Newcastle and Alnwick Parishes were erected simultaneously. Alnwick and Newcastle are the county town and largest city of historical Northumberland County, England. This may be the origin of the two parishes' names.

Another possibility is that the parish was named in honour of the Duke of Newcastle, Prime Minister of Great Britain 1757–1762. The Duke had no obvious connection to the name Alnwick.

== History ==
Newcastle was erected in 1786 as one of Northumberland County's original parishes. including all or part of most parishes in Northumberland and Kent Counties.

== Boundaries ==
Newcastle Parish is bounded:

- on the north by the Gloucester County line;
- on the east by a line beginning on the county line at a point about 3.3 kilometres west-southwesterly of Route 8, then running south (Note: By the magnet of 1850, when declination in the area was between 20º and 21º west of north. The Territorial Division Act clause referring to magnetic direction bearings was omitted in the 1952 and 1973 Revised Statutes.) to the Route 8 bridge over the Bartibog River, then down the Bartibog River to its mouth;
- on the south by the Miramichi River and Northwest Miramichi River;
- on the west by a line beginning on southeastern corner of a grant to Oliver Willard on the western side of Jones Cove, then running north to the county line;
- including Bartibog Island in the Miramichi.

=== Evolution of boundaries ===
The original boundaries of Newcastle were Westmorland County on the south, a line due west from the northern tip of Portage Island on the north, and a north-south line through the mouth of Cains River on the west.

In 1814 Northumberland County was completely reorganised and Newcastle took on a more recognisable shape. The boundary with Northesk was different, starting near the old courthouse and passing through the intersection of Newcastle Boulevard and Beaverbrook Road.

In 1824 the boundary with Northesk was moved west to its modern starting point on Jones Cove. The direction of the boundary was also changed to run north instead of prolongation a grant line, which transferred a triangle of territory in the south to Newcastle and a triangle in the north to Northesk.

In 1850 the boundary with Alnwick Parish was adjusted by running further up the Bartibog River before turning north.

== Communities ==
Communities at least partly within the parish. bold indicates an incorporated municipality or Indian reserve; italics indicate a name no longer in official use

- Bartibog
- Beaver Brook Station
- Bellefond
- Beveridge
- Busby
- East Beaver Brook
- **Eel Ground 2**
- Highbank
- Little Bartibog
- Lower Newcastle
- Morrissy
- Patterson Siding
- Russellville
- Telly Road Crossing
- **Miramichi**
  - Back Lots
  - Cross Roads
  - Douglastown
  - Ferry Road
  - Millbank
- **Miramichi**
  - Moorefield
  - Newcastle
  - Nordin
  - Northwest Bridge

== Bodies of water ==
Bodies of water (Note: Not including brooks, ponds or coves.) at least partly within the parish.

- Bartibog River
- Big Eskedelloc River
- Little Bartibog River
- Miramichi River
- Northwest Miramichi River
- Northwest Millstream
- Armstrong Lake
- The Lake

== Islands ==
Islands at least partly within the parish.

- Bartibog Island

== Other notable places ==
Parks, historic sites, and other noteworthy places at least partly within the parish.

- Bellefond Protected Natural Area
- East Branch Portage River Protected Natural Area
- Green Brook Protected Natural Area
- MacDonald Farm Provincial Park
- MacDonald Farm Wildlife Management Area

== Demographics ==
Parish population total does not include Eel Ground 2 Indian reserve and portion within Miramichi

=== Population ===
Population trend

Census	Population	Change (%)
2016	1,136	▼6.9%
2011	1,220	▲0.9%
2006	1,209	▼1.5%
2001	1,228	▼2.3%
1996	1,257	▲6.6%
1991	1,179	N/A

=== Language ===
Mother tongue (2016)

Language	Population	Pct (%)
English only	740	65.2%
French only	345	30.4%
Both English and French	30	2.6%
Other languages	20	1.8%

== See also ==
- List of parishes in New Brunswick
