= New York University School of Professional Studies =

School within New York University

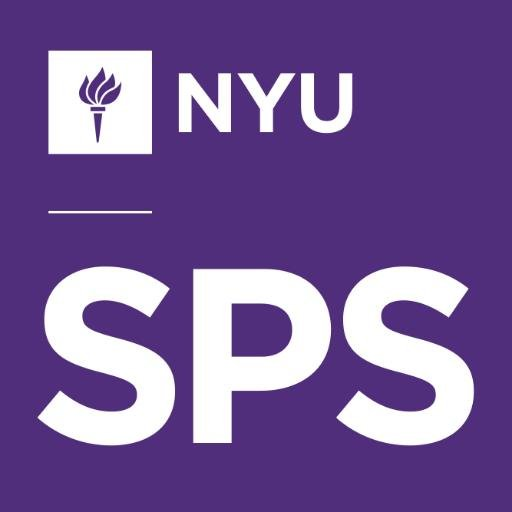
- Former names: School of Continuing and Professional Studies; School of Continuing Education; School of Continuing Education and Extension Services; Division of General Education and Extension Services; Division of General Education
- Type: Private
- Established: 1934; 92 years ago
- Parent institution: New York University
- Dean: Angie Kamath
- Location: 7 East 12th Street, New York, New York, United States
- Campus: Urban
- Website: www.sps.nyu.edu
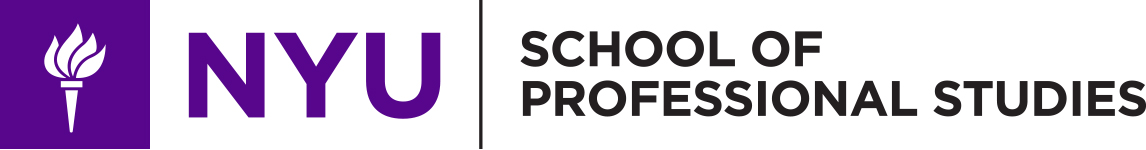

The New York University School of Professional Studies (SPS) is one of the schools and colleges that compose New York University and that is oriented towards pragmatic, career-connected undergraduate- and masters-level degrees and continuing education offerings. The school was founded in 1934 as the Division of General Education and supplied adult education courses in subjects that were socially useful during the Great Depression in the United States, the home front during World War II, and the postwar era. By 1966, it had been renamed to the School of Continuing Education and came to feature 2,000 continuing education courses with some 50,000 students in them, largely oriented towards servicing career change goals or supporting personal fulfillment. The change to the present name occurred in 2014 and is part of a shift in the school towards providing more degree-oriented programs and enrolling more degree-seeking students and having fewer continuing education students. The school's main offices are located at 7 East 12th Street on the University's main campus in the Washington Square Park area.

== History ==
=== 1930s–1950s ===
The story of the school begins with its establishment in 1934, as the Division of General Education (DGE). The new entity pulled together several programs that had existed for decades in adult education and extension efforts. Some predecessors dated to 1908, while the Division of Extra-Mural Instruction went back to the 1890s.

In the beginning, the division had some 6,000 students across 200 courses. It offered courses in adult education such as "Character Building" and "Social Hygiene" as well as Women's Law (a storied class with a long history and its own alumni organization) while sponsoring lectures on "The American Way". New York University's School of Education did not accept the courses offered through the DGE as part of the "in-residence" requirements towards a Bachelor's degree.

During the Depression years, when almost 25 percent of the U.S. workforce was unemployed, the DGE responded with training programs for new social workers in the Temporary Emergency Relief Association, the city's public welfare agency, and the Home Relief Bureau. Many of those so trained went on to staff positions in various New Deal programs.

The Washington Square Writing Center was begun around 1935. It quickly became popular: by 1938 the center had some five hundred students spread out over thirteen evening, non-credit courses covering both fiction and non-fiction writing in various manifestations. Instructors at the school included Harlan Logan and Albert Maltz. By 1940, the center was expanding the number of courses dealing with English grammar and composition and aimed at people looking for greater achievements in their vocations. Meanwhile, two novels that had been at least partly written during fiction courses were accepted for publication. Two decades later, the Washington Square Writing Center was still going: in 1954, it was offering sixteen different courses, a number that rose to twenty-one in 1955. Classes were still taught in the evening and were still aimed both at aspiring writers of various kinds as well as people in other careers who wanted to improve their writing skills.

During World War II, the division offered classes in new technologies, foreign languages, and industrial management.

After the war, there was a need to get returning veterans into the labor market; in response to increasing demand for skills, training, and for-credit courses, DGE developed, among other new programs, a Certificate in General Education, which required forty-eight semester hours of study over a one-to-six year period, and that helped veterans fulfill requirements under the G.I. Bill. DGE also formulated the Management Institute to focus on courses for business and industry, such as in areas involving systems and procedures.

In 1954, the school's name was adjusted to the Division of General Education and Extension Services (DGEES) to reflect the full scope of its non-degree, adult education-related activities. New departments were created, including the Office of Special Services to Business and Industry, which also included programs of interest to governmental bodies, and the Liberal Arts in Extension program, based on a grant from the Fund for Adult Education to further adult education at locations beyond the immediate NYU campus. Enrollment surpassed that of any other individual school at NYU.

In 1958, the school offered a series of seminars aimed at studying the idea that America's success as a country would come to rely on cultivating creativity. Dr. Myron Coler, a former supervisor on the Manhattan Project and a consultant for both Oak Ridge and Brookhaven National Laboratories, headed the project which initially focused on using creativity in scientific fields.

=== 1960s–1980s ===
The School of Continuing Education's 168-page bulletin of course and program offerings, Spring 1979

In the 1960s, the Office of Community Service Programs was created, as was the Division of Business and Management. Associate's degree offerings began in 1964, in fields including the liberal arts, business, public service, and physical therapy; these generally took four years of part-time study to complete, although subsequently they could be done within three years. These introductions laid the groundwork for the future Paul McGhee Division for adult learners returning to college to earn a degree.

The school produced a monthly publication, Pleasures in Learning; in 1964, Milton R. Stern served as editor.

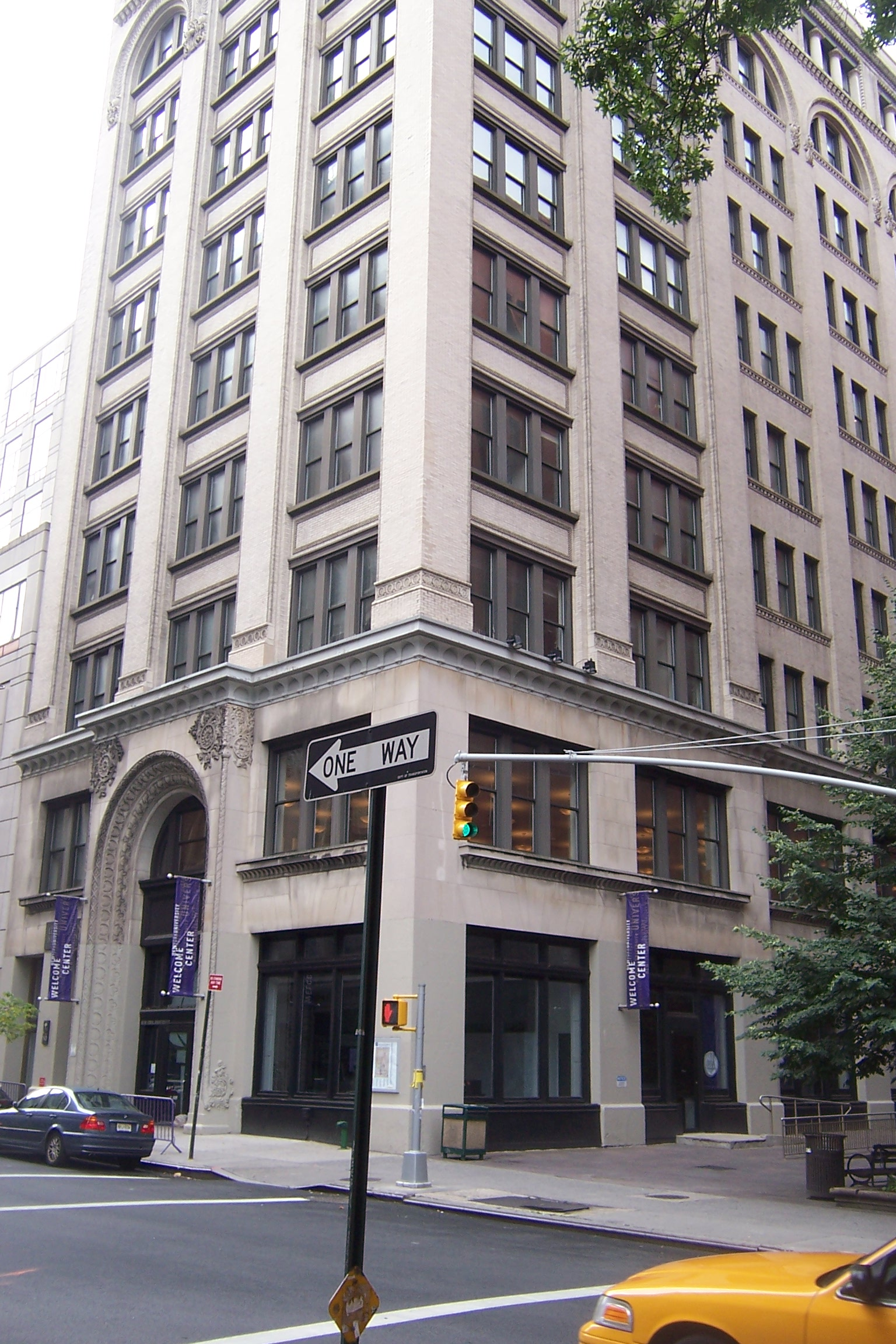
Shimkin Hall, for many years the center of the School of Continuing Education

By 1966, the school had been renamed to the School of Continuing Education and Extension Services, but was often referred to as just the School of Continuing Education (SCE). In 1966, the publisher Leon Shimkin, chairman of Simon & Schuster, pledged $2 million to NYU's capital fund in part to renovate and modernize the existing New York University School of Commerce building, an 11-story structure on a corner of Washington Square Park. (Shimkin had studied in the School of Commerce as a youth, first full-time for a year and then at night, and later had given a course in book publishing at the Division of General Education.) Renamed to Shimkin Hall, the structure served as the headquarters for the School of Continuing Education and Extension Services and was the location for many of its classrooms.

In the 1970s, new diploma programs were created in release estate, data processing, computer technology, and systems analysis. The Institute for Paralegal Studies was created. The General Studies Program was instituted to offer two years of instruction to college-age students, conducted on a full-time basis during the day and leading to an associate's degree. There was a boom in the real estate market during the 1970s, and an expansion of the school's Real Estate Institute.

Programs for bachelor's degrees were also added along the way. At the time, though, students going for degrees were still a small fraction of the overall School of Continuing Education enrollment: for instance, 1,700 out of 56,000 in the early 1980s.

By the late 1970s, the most popular programs at the school were in data processing and real estate, with each having enrollments of around 3,000 students in a term. The content of courses often changed with demand, and SCE continued ramping up its information technology offerings in the 1970s. In the 1980s, the school extended its growth by expanding its publishing and business programs.

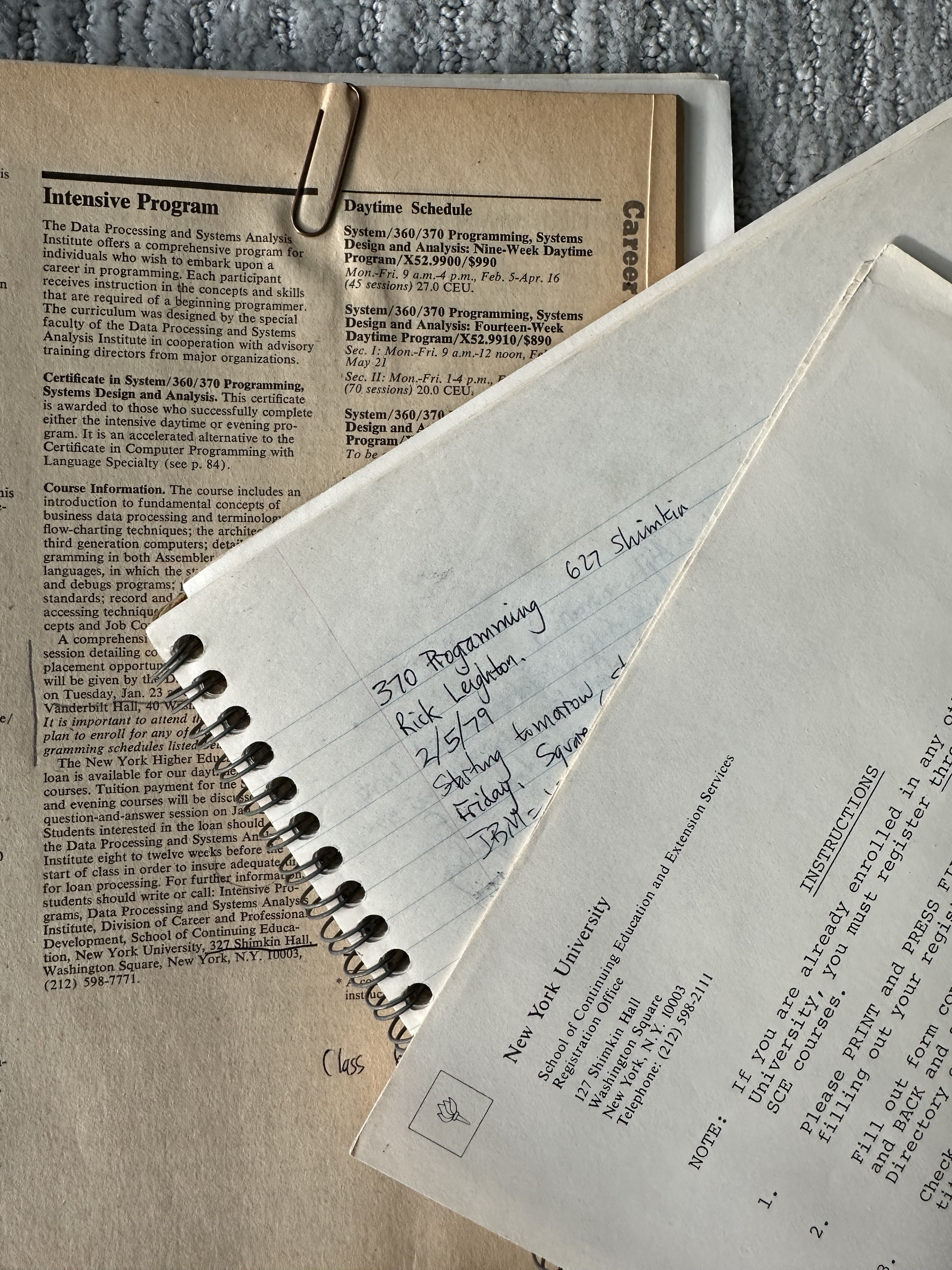
Catalog and course materials for 1979 edition of 'the Intensive': a full-time, nine-week program in COBOL and Assembler language for the IBM System/370 designed to providing a launching point for a career as a computer programmer in business applications

The school was explicitly marketed as a place for people to begin a career change. Ann Marcus, the dean of the School of Continuing Education during the 1970s, said: "Our program is mainly focused on career development and upgrading." First among these was computer technology, with an introductory course and a broad range of follow-ons available, or, for those more intent on a change as soon as possible, a nine-week, full-time, intensive course in computer programming. Various other career choices were promoted, and even the school's liberal arts courses leaned towards the pragmatic.

There was a trend across the nation for adults to return to college for additional education, either for personal fulfillment or to improve their career prospects. About half the students at the School of Continuing Education were between ages 26 and 35 and a large majority between 22 and 45. NYU's primary competitor in the market for continuing education was The New School for Social Research, which also offered a large catalog of courses, a Lower Manhattan location, and increasing enrollments. At times some New York-area institutions attempted to compete with the pair, such as Columbia University. But these other places lacked the long experience of NYU and the New School in this area and found that establishing financially successful continuing education programs was more difficult than they first thought.

Writing courses, including for those attempting to improve at fiction, remained popular at the school. Classes in filmmaking were also popular, included a full-time film production workshop given during the summer.

By 1984, the School of Continuing Education had more than 50,000 students across some 2,000 courses, had increased its enrollment by almost a third in the prior decade, and was the largest continuing education program of any private university in the nation.

Real estate seminars were a steady presence at the school. This went back to 1967, when the school's Real Estate Institute was announced. In 1979, the school opened a Midtown Manhattan operation, which helped bring in a new source of continuing education students. Located at 11 West 42nd Street, this would house the Real Estate Institute beginning in the 1980s. A new degree, Master of Science in Real Estate, was launched in the late 1980s, partly funded by the builder Larry Silverstein. By 2004, that masters program was growing and had 500 students in it. In 2008, it would be renamed as the NYU Schack Institute of Real Estate after a $10 million donation by the Schack family.

=== 1990s ===
The 1990s saw SCE exploring virtual and Internet-based learning, and new degree and certificate programs were created in hospitality and tourism, real estate, digital technology, and media. Following technological advances in media, the Center for Advanced Digital Applications was formed. In 1998, the school's name was modified to the School of Continuing and Professional Studies (SCPS).

=== 2010s–2020s ===
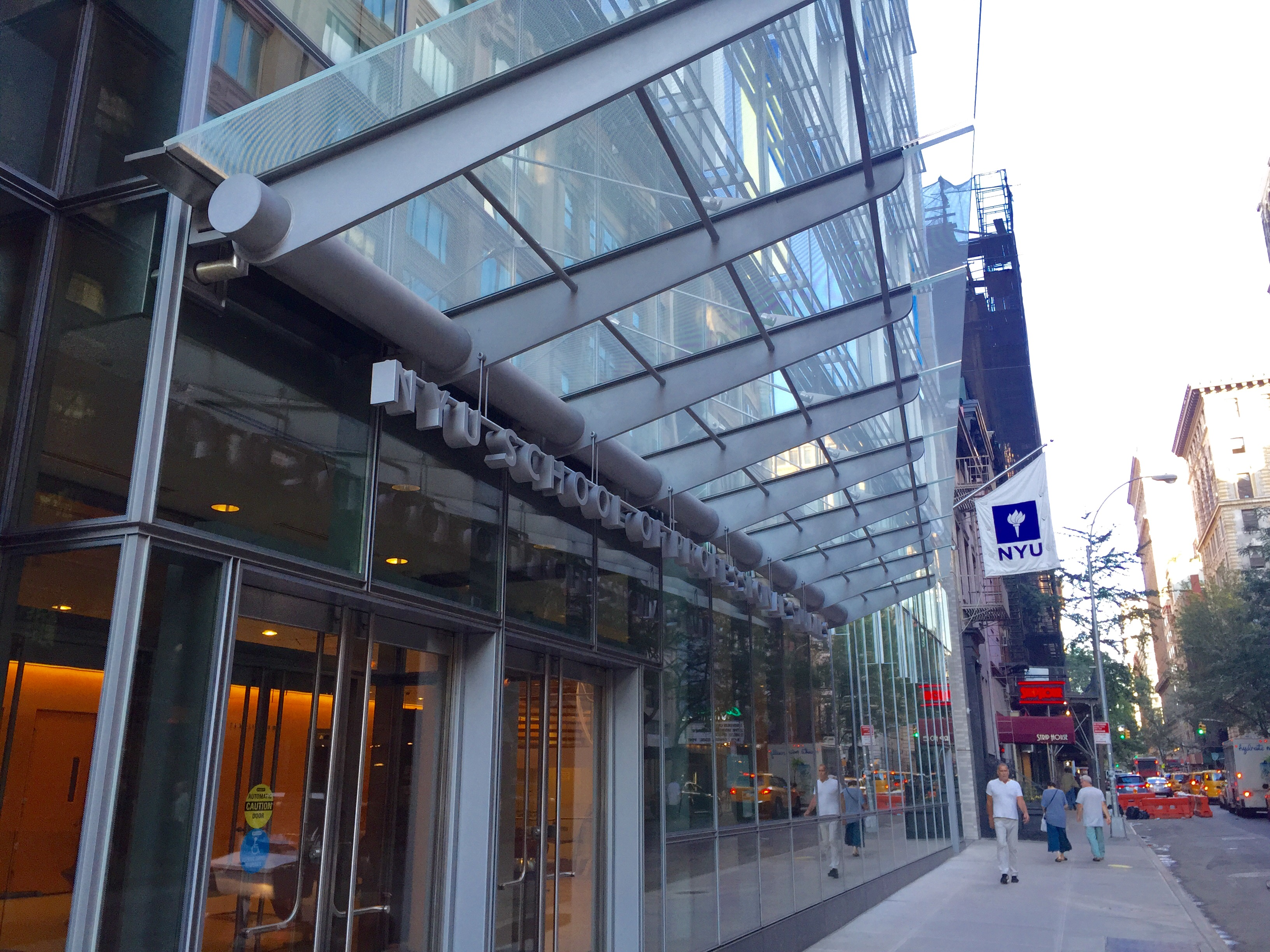

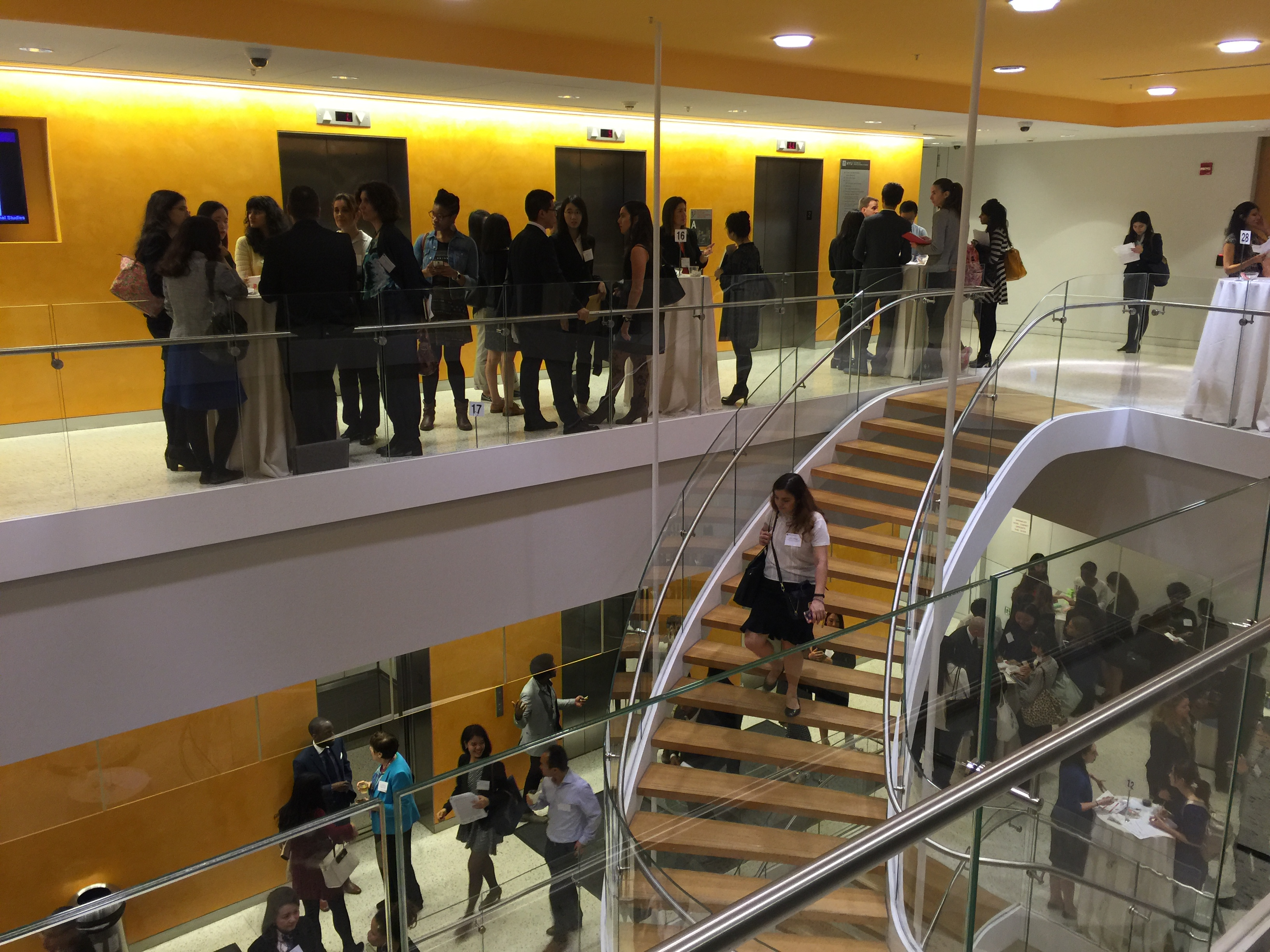
Exterior and interior of the School of Professional Services main building at 7 East 12th Street, as seen in 2015

In 2011, the school moved into a new headquarters location on 12th Street near Fifth Avenue in Manhattan. At that point, the school had about 5,000 degree-seeking students in both undergraduate and graduate programs and about 30,000 non-credit students among 1,500 continuing education courses and certificate-granting programs.

As of 2021, the school offered 20 graduate degree programs and 3 traditional bachelor's degrees. Through its Division of Applied Undergraduate Studies, students who could not attend school full-time, transfer students, as well as older students who wish to return to school, could complete a bachelor's or associate degree.

The school was renamed the NYU School of Professional Studies in 2014. By then, its staffing consisted of more than 100 full-time professors and some 2,000 who were teaching on an adjunct basis. There were almost 5,000 students enrolled on a degree basis and around 48,000 people enrolled annually in various noncredit courses and programs.

In 2017, the Paul McGhee Division was restructured to focus less on bachelor degrees and more on associate degrees and renamed to the Division of Applied Undergraduate Studies. The intent was to provide a lower-cost option and compete with local community colleges, as more were looking for career-oriented courses and fewer toward a liberal arts degree. As part of this change, ten full-time SPS faculty members were laid off. One student protesting the changes said to the Washington Square News: "SPS is changing from an academic institution to an international corporate enterprise." The change also provoked some nervousness among incoming students.

In July 2021, Angie Kamath was appointed as the School's dean. By this decade, the school was perhaps most known for its programs in real estate, hospitality, and sports management.

For the academic year 2020–21, the school was home to 3,634 graduate students, 1,423 traditional undergraduate students, and 696 post-traditional undergraduate students; in addition, it educated more that 11,000 students who were enrolled in its continuing education courses and certificate programs during the academic year 2019–20. By the mid-2020s, the school featured some 37 different types of degrees being granted and 5,000 students enrolled in degree programs, while the number of continuing education students was placed at around 10,000.

== Buildings ==
Classes are held at four locations:

- 7 East 12th Street (also houses the Office of Admissions, the Office of the Dean, the Office of Noncredit Student Services in addition to the School's other administrative offices)
- The Washington Square campus in Greenwich Village
- The NYU Midtown Center at 11 West 42nd Street
- The Woolworth Building at 15 Barclay Street in downtown Manhattan

== Academics ==
The school offers associate degree programs, bachelor's degree programs, graduate degree programs, and continuing education courses and certificates. In addition, it offers executive education programs for individuals and organizations. NYU SPS has departments and divisions in liberal arts, global affairs, publishing, business, English, hospitality, sports business and management, and real estate.

=== Undergraduate degrees ===
NYU SPS offers bachelor's degrees for students entering directly out of high school in hotel and tourism management, real estate, and sport management. Bachelor's degrees for transfer students, adult learners, active duty members of the military, and military veterans include programs in applied data analytics and visualization, applied general studies, digital communications and media, healthcare management, leadership and management, information systems management, real estate, marketing analytics, humanities and social sciences. These programs are available for those who have earned 45 transferable college credits or more.

Associate degrees can be obtained at the school in the areas of business, health administration, information systems management, and liberal arts.

=== Graduate degrees ===
Graduate degrees are offered in the areas of Construction Management, Real Estate Development, Real Estate, Global Affairs; Global Security, Conflict, and Cybercrime, Event Management, Global Hospitality Management, Travel and Tourism Management, Executive Coaching, Human Capital Analytics and Technology, Human Resources Management and Development, Integrated Marketing, Public Relations and Corporate Communication, Management and Systems, Project Management, Publishing, Professional Writing, Sports Business, Global Sport, Translation & Interpreting.

== Student life ==
Some SPS students have noted that the school seems to be little known.

According to a 2025 piece in the Washington Square News, SPS students tended to dress on the professional side of things, matching their desire to gain career-related connections.

== Rankings and recognition ==
In 2020, the NYU SPS Schack Institute of Real Estate BS in Real Estate program was ranked #3 nationwide by U.S. News & World Report Education in the category of Undergraduate Program - Real Estate.

The NYU SPS Preston Robert Tisch Institute for Global Sport MS in Sports Business was ranked #16 globally (up from #31) in the SportsBusiness Postgraduate Rankings for 2020.

The NYU SPS MS in Public Relations and Corporate Communication was named the winner of the 2021 PR Week Awards for Outstanding Education Program.

== Centers ==
SPS is home to five centers:

- Center for Global Affairs: Prepares the next generation of leaders in international relations to address critical global issues and to champion social justice, equality, global security, and sustainability.
- Center for Publishing and Applied Liberal Arts: Fosters innovation in the interrelated fields of publishing, professional writing, translation, and the liberal arts.
- Jonathan M. Tisch Center of Hospitality: Prepares students for hospitality management, travel, and tourism careers.
- Preston Robert Tisch Institute for Global Sport: Prepares individuals from around the world for careers in the sports industry.
- Schack Institute of Real Estate: Prepares students for careers in real estate and real estate development.

== Notable Faculty & Advisors ==
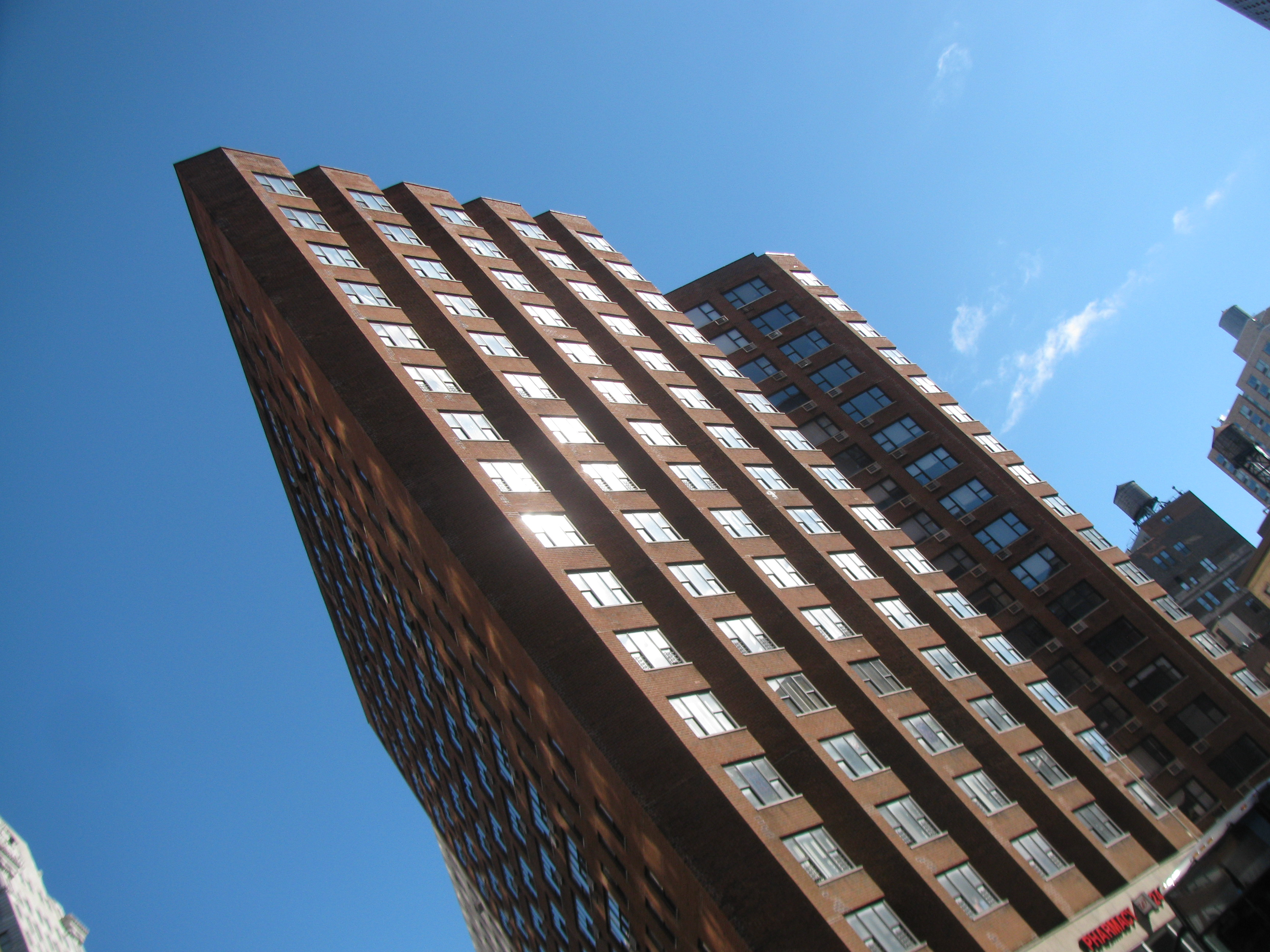
145 Fourth Avenue, a prior headquarters for the school

- Cameron Myler, Olympian
- Jennifer Trahan, Legal Scholar
- Marc Bell, Financier
- Larry Silverstein, Real Estate Mogul
- Sarah Kate Ellis, President of GLAAD
- Admiral (ret.) Samuel J. Locklear, former Commander of United States Indo-Pacific Command
- Richard Wolffe, Journalist
- Roy Doliner, Novelist

== Notable alumni ==
- Marc Bell
- Burcu Esmersoy
- Vanessa O'Brien
- Robin Wilson
- Nastia Liukin
- Mary Wilson
- Leah Remini

== Conferences ==
The NYU School of Professional Studies hosts a range of conferences including:

- The Annual NYU International Hospitality Investment Conference
- The Annual REIT Symposium
- The Annual Conference on Capital Markets in Real Estate
- The National Symposium of Women in Real Estate
- Multiple Tax Conferences
