= Chelmsford (disambiguation) =

Chelmsford is a city in Essex, England.

Chelmsford may also refer to:

== Australia ==
- Chelmsford, Queensland, a locality in the Southern Burnett Region
- Chelmsford Royal Commission, an Australian investigation into the Chelmsford Private Hospital.

== Canada ==
- Chelmsford, New Brunswick
- Chelmsford, Ontario

== United Kingdom ==
- Chelmsford (UK Parliament constituency)
- Chelmsford City F.C., a football club in the above city
- Chelmsford railway station, a railway station in the above city
- City of Chelmsford, a local government district
- Chelmsford 123, a sitcom set in the above city
- Maldon and East Chelmsford (UK Parliament constituency)
- West Chelmsford (UK Parliament constituency)

== United States ==
- Chelmsford, Massachusetts, Middlesex County
  - Chelmsford High School, a high school in the above town

== People ==
- Viscount Chelmsford, in the Peerage of the United Kingdom
- Frederic Thesiger, 2nd Baron Chelmsford, known for command during the Anglo-Zulu War
- Frederic Thesiger, 1st Viscount Chelmsford
