= Barnaby River =

River in New Brunswick, Canada

Coordinates: 46.887944°N 65.549326°W

The Barnaby River is a tributary of the Miramichi River in New Brunswick, Canada.

The Barnaby River rises in southern Northumberland County, close to the Kent County, New Brunswick boundary and flows north and west into the south side of the Southwest Miramichi River at the community of Kirkwood, New Brunswick.

The Barnaby River watershed is entirely rural, dominated by forests and small farms in the communities of Lower Barnaby, Upper Barnaby, and the Community of Barnaby River.

== River Crossings ==
- New Brunswick Route 118 south of Kirkwood close to Barnaby Island
- between Lower Barnaby & Upper Barnaby,
- South East of the Community of Barnaby River
- North of Murray Settlement on New Brunswick Route 126
- Route 126 north of Collette

== See also ==
- List of rivers of New Brunswick
