= Oyster River (New Brunswick) =

River in New Brunswick, Canada

Oyster River is a small tributary of the Miramichi River of New Brunswick, Canada. It flows into the estuary of the Miramichi River, commonly called Miramichi Bay, some five miles downstream of the city of Miramichi. It enters the north bank of the river.

Oyster River flows through a low-lying forested section of Alnwick Parish, New Brunswick. Recently it has not supported an Atlantic Salmon fishery, but is known for Brook Trout. There is little settlement along the river. In former times there were several houses along its mouth with a mixed Scotch and Acadian population.

== See also ==
- List of rivers of New Brunswick
