= Wayerton, New Brunswick =

Coordinates: 47°8′3″N 65°49′50.3″W

Wayerton is a community in the Canadian province of New Brunswick. It is located in Northumberland County, approximately 5.5 kilometres (3.4 mi) north of Sevogle.

== See also ==
- List of communities in New Brunswick
