= Barnaby River, New Brunswick =

Community in New Brunswick, Canada

Coordinates: 47.03094°N 65.372944°W

Barnaby River is a Canadian community in Northumberland County, New Brunswick. It is located south of the city of Miramichi.

The community is located along the railway line from Miramichi to Moncton. This community is named after the Barnaby River which runs to the south of the community. The community is located at the Intersection of New Brunswick Route 126 and Barnaby Road.

== History ==
Settled in 1825, Barnaby River was an agricultural and forestry settlement where 16 families lived. In 1871 the settlement and surrounding area had a population of 500. In 1904 Barnaby River was also a railway station and had 1 post office, 3 stores, 1 flour mill, 1 church and a population of 250.

== See also ==
- List of communities in New Brunswick

== Border communities ==
- Murray Settlement
- Kirkwood
- Nowlanville
