= Tabusintac Lagoon and River Estuary =

- Interactive map of Tabusintac Lagoon and River Estuary
- Coordinates: 47°20′N 64°56′W
- Area: 50 square kilometres (19 sq mi)

Ramsar Wetland
- Designated: 10 June 1993
- Reference no.: 612

The Tabusintac Lagoon and River Estuary is a wetland in Alnwick Parish, Northumberland County, in north-eastern New Brunswick, Canada. It was classified as a wetland of international importance on June 10, 1993. It is also a globally significant Important Bird Area for the population of common terns, and shorebirds in general, that it supports. Primarily a shallow coastal estuary with gentle slopes, the 50 km^{2} site is underlain by various sedimentary rocks, including red sandstone and shale. The lagoon system is protected from the Gulf of Saint Lawrence by a constantly shifting barrier beach and dune system that frequently blocks commonly used navigation channels. It attains an elevation of no more than 8 m above sea level.

It is located on the Acadian Peninsula, and includes Tabusintac Bay and the mouth of the Tabusintac River. It also contains roughly 6 km^{2} of peatlands, within which are numerous freshwater ponds.
