= Trahan =

Trahan is a surname. Notable people with the surname include:

- Arthur Trahan, French-Canadian judge
- Barry Trahan, American politician
- Blake Trahan, American baseball player
- Clifford Joseph Trahan, better known as musician Johnny Rebel
- Cody Trahan, American softball player
- David Trahan, American politician
- Don Trahan, American golf instructor and father of D. J.
- D. J. Trahan, American golfer
- Jennifer Trahan, American academic
- Lori Trahan, American politician
- Michaël Trahan, French-Canadian poet
- Patrick Trahan, American football player
- Ryan Trahan, American cross-country runner and YouTuber
- Stryker Trahan, American baseball player
- Voorhies Trahan, American crawfish farmer

== Other ==
- Trahan, a brand of handmade premium cigar manufactured at the El Rey de los Habanos factory in Miami, Florida
