= Roy Doliner =

American novelist (1932–2015)

Roy Doliner (1932 – 2015) was an American author who published nine novels between the 1960s and 1980s, some of which were satires and some of which were in the spy fiction genre. He was also a longtime writing teacher at the New York University School of Continuing Education.

== Life and career ==
Doliner grew up in Brooklyn, New York, and attended Boys High School, where he was a starting outfielder on the varsity baseball team. He then went to New York University. In 1954, he graduated from there with a B.A. degree. He served in U.S. Army Intelligence during the 1950s, and then remained active in some related capacity during the later stages of the Cuban Revolution.

He married Aye (Patricia) Than, daughter of a prominent Burmese official, in 1964. The Secretary‐General of the United Nations, U Thant, accompanied the bride, who was employed at the UN. The couple lived in Manhattan; they would have two children together, and she would go on to a long career with the UN Development Programme. In 1966, Doliner sued his father in New York Supreme Court, claiming that his father had cut him out of the family canning business because he had married someone who was not Jewish.

Doliner's first novel, Young Man Willing (1960), was set in New York's Broadway theatre scene. It was published in the United Kingdom as well as in the United States. His second novel, The Orange Air (1961), was a quasi-farce set in post-revolution Cuba and had a former major league baseball pitcher as protagonist. Film rights were sold for his third novel, Sandra Rifkin's Jewels (1966), and CBS Theatrical Films and Jerry Bick made a production agreement for it, but no film was ever made. (At least one other novel of Doliner's was optioned, also without any result.) These first three novels of Doliner's tended to be lighter in tone, with satirical aspects; The Antagonists (1967) represented a turn to the more serious.

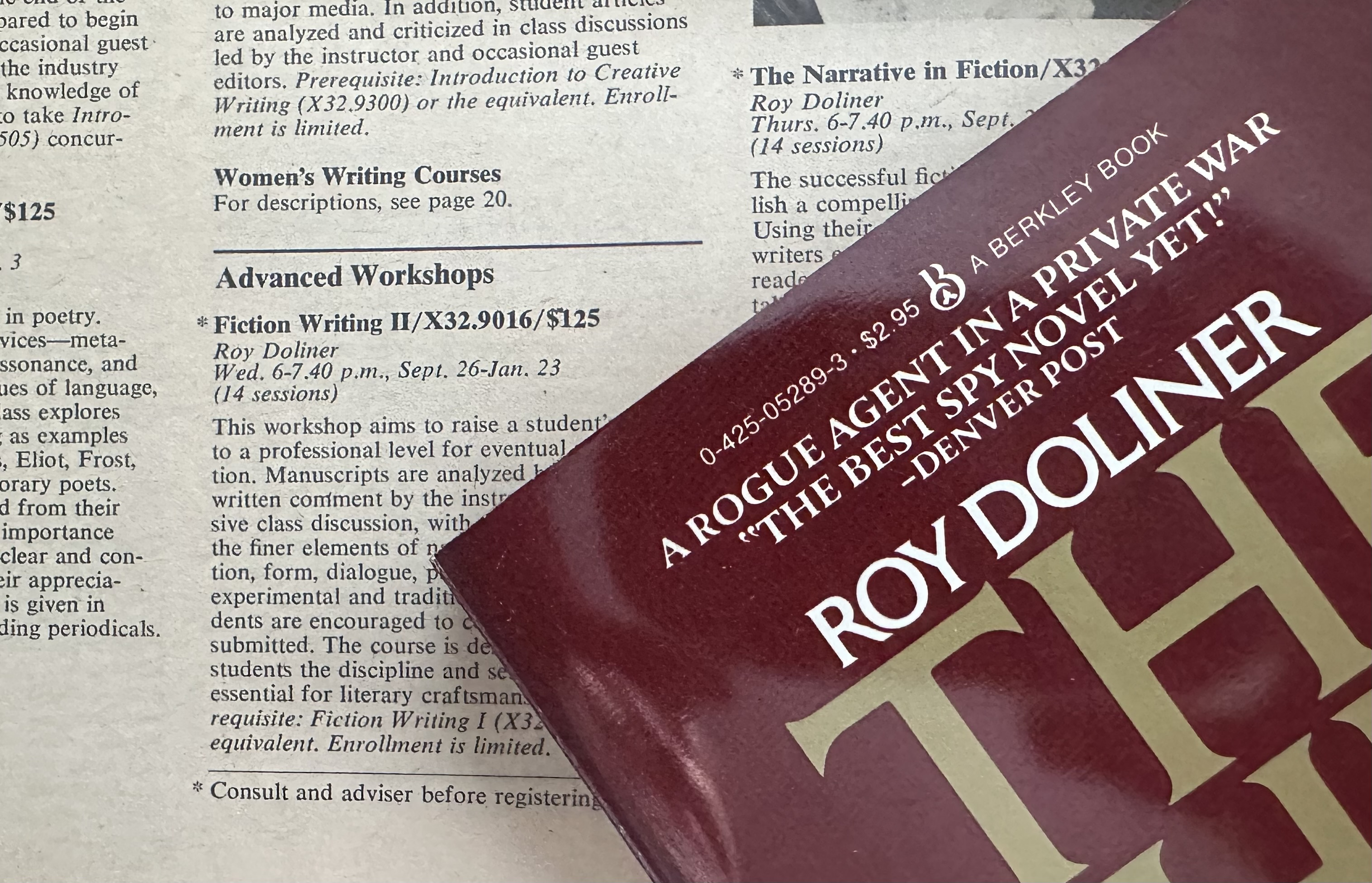
Portions of a cover of a Doliner novel and course listing for his fiction writing course

Over time, Doliner came to specialize in the 'intelligent thriller', or as a Newsday profile put it, "thrillers distinguished for craftsmanship and depth of theme." His 1980 novel The Thin Line was a prequel to his earlier On The Edge, with both featuring disillusioned American intelligence agent Jack Sullivan. In addition to novels, Doliner wrote for magazines and worked on film screenplays. He was a member of the Authors Guild.

Doliner also taught writing. In particular, he was a lecturer at the New York University School of Continuing Education, with his "Fiction Writing II" course seeking to "raise a student's work to a professional level for eventual publication." The class was popular and he taught it for a number of years.

== Commercial and critical reception ==
During his career, Doliner bounced around among major publishing houses, with his novels being put out by Charles Scribner's Sons, Doubleday, Simon and Schuster, Viking Press, and Crown Publishers among others.

Reviews of Doliner's novels were generally positive-to-mixed. Writing for the New York Times Book Review, critic Anthony Boucher characterized The Orange Air as defying stylistic labels and being "an enjoyable and often acute novel." By comparison, the pseudonymous Newgate Callendar, writing for the same publication, found The Thin Line unsatisfactory and "an ambitious book that somehow fails to coalesce."

== Works ==
- Young Man Willing (Charles Scribner's Sons, 1960) [subsequent editions Fawcett, 1961; New English Library, London, 1964]
- The Orange Air (Charles Scribner's Sons, 1961)
- Sandra Rifkin's Jewels (New American Library, 1966) [same imprint, 1968]
- The Antagonists (Doubleday, 1967) [Barker 1968, Corgi 1969]
- Rules of the Game (Doubleday, 1970)
- For Love Or Money (Simon and Schuster, 1974)
- On The Edge (Viking Press, 1978) [Ballantine Books, 1978; Collins Crime Club, 1979; Fontana, 1980]
- The Thin Line (Crown Publishers, 1980) [Berkley Books, 1982]
- The Twelfth of April (Crown Publishers, 1985) [Pocket Books, 1986]
