= Bartibog River =

Waterway in New Brunswick, Canada

Coordinates: 47°6′30.9″N 65°22′14.5″W

The Bartibog River (also spelled Bartibogue) is a tributary of the Miramichi River in New Brunswick, Canada.

It honours Bartholomew La Bogue, a Mi'kmaq chief, "who was called Balt Bogue by the Indians (indigenous) and Bartabogue by the French and English" (Rayburn)".

The Bartibog River rises in northeastern Northumberland County and flows east and south into the Miramichi River at the local service district of Oak Point-Bartibog Bridge.

The Bartibog River watershed is entirely rural, dominated by forests and small farms in the communities of Oak Point-Bartibog Bridge, Lower Newcastle-Russellville, Bartibog, and Bartibog Station. Below Russellville the river is tidal.

The promontory on the east bank of the Bartibogue where it meets the Miramichi is called Moody's Point. It is the location of one of the oldest Roman Catholic Churches in the Miramichi Valley, Sts Peter and Paul's, dating from the 1850s.

The lower stretches of the Bartibogue were settled by people from Scotland, arriving from the 1780s onward. They were of mixed Catholic and Presbyterian background. A number of Irish families and several Acadian families settled later.

The Bartibogue River along with the area in general has been known to be a hot spot for tornadoes, often being referred to as the "tornado alley" of New Brunswick.

== See also ==
- List of rivers of New Brunswick
