= Barryville-New Jersey =

Unincorporated community in New Brunswick, Canada

Coordinates: 47°09′N 65°15′W

Barryville-New Jersey is an unincorporated community within the former Canadian local service district of the parish of Alnwick in Northumberland County, New Brunswick. (Note: Barryville-New Jersey was an area with enhanced services within the LSD but was sometimes described as an LSD.)

== Demographics ==
In the 2021 Census of Population conducted by Statistics Canada, Barryville-New Jersey had a population of 214 living in 113 of its 124 total private dwellings, a change of 1.9% from its 2016 population of 210. With a land area of 46.46 km^{2} (17.94 sq mi), it had a population density of 4.6/km^{2} (11.9/sq mi) in 2021.

== See also ==
- List of communities in New Brunswick
