= Milton R. Stern =

American author and educator

- Born: August 22, 1928
- Died: July 26, 2011 (aged 82); Needham, Massachusetts
- Education: Doctor of Philosophy
- Alma mater: Michigan State University, 1955
- Occupations: Educator; Author

Milton R. Stern (August 22, 1928 – July 26, 2011) was an American professor of English and American literature, who specialized in studies of the works of Herman Melville and F. Scott Fitzgerald, best known for his "landmark books" on Melville, Fitzgerald, and Hawthorne, particularly The Fine Hammered Steel of Herman Melville, and also for editing the "pioneering" four-volume American Literature Survey for the Viking Portable Library.

== Background ==
Milton R. Stern was born on August 22, 1928, in Roxbury, Massachusetts. His parents David and Elizabeth Stern came from Eastern Europe. In 1949, he graduated with a BA from Northeastern University. In 1951, he received an MA from the University of Connecticut (UConn) and in 1955 a doctorate from Michigan State University, both in American literature.

== Career ==
A member of New York University School of Professional Studies's administrative staff beginning in 1946, Stern served as an assistant dean at the adult education center in 1964.

In 1955, Stern began teaching at the University of Illinois. In 1958, he joined the English Department at UConn in 1958. He served as founding chairman of the Connecticut Humanities Council, dedicated to spreading literacy and culture to the state. He also championed adult education. Stern taught until retirement in 1991.

Stern was guest professor at the University of Wyoming, Smith College, and Harvard University.

== Personal life and death ==
In 1949, Stern married Harriet Marks; they had two children.

Stern was a long-time member of the Melville Society.

Stern died age 82 on July 26, 2011, in Needham, Massachusetts. of complications due to stroke.

== Awards ==
- 1960: American Council of Learned Societies
- 1964-1965: Fulbright professor at University of Warsaw
- 1969: Outstanding Teacher Award at University of Connecticut
- 1971: Guggenheim Fellowship in American Literary
- 1976: First Alumni Association Distinguished Professor award at University of Connecticut
- 1977: Fellow at the National Humanities Institute at Yale University
- 1979: Fellow at the Modern Media Institute Center in St. Petersburg, Florida
- 1981: Outstanding Alumnus in Arts and the Humanities from Northeastern University
- 1983: First Wilbur Cross Award winner conferred by the Connecticut Humanities Council
- 1985: Celebrated Teacher by the Associated Departments of English Program of the Modern Language Association
- 1996: Honorary Life Member of the F. Scott Fitzgerald Society

== Works ==
Stern was an expert on Herman Melville, the American transcendentalists, and F. Scott Fitzgerald. He wrote books of literary criticism, numerous articles, reviews, and co-edited an anthology of American literature. He wrote "landmark books" on Melville, Fitzgerald, and Hawthorne. He also edited the "pioneering" four-volume American Literature Survey for the Viking Portable Library.

The following list comes from the catalog of the Library of Congress:

- The Fine Hammered Steel of Herman Melville; With a Checklist of Melville Studies. University of Illinois Press. 1957.
- Discussions of Moby-Dick (1960)
- American Literature Survey: Nation and Regions, 1860-1900, edited with Seymour L. Gross (1962, 1968, 1975, 1977)
- House of the seven gables, edited with introduction (1965, 1981)
- First years in college; preparing students for a successful college career, edited with * * Golden moment: the novels of F. Scott Fitzgerald (1970)
- The Golden Moment: The Novels of F. Scott Fitzgerald. University of Illinois Press. 1970. ISBN 9780252001079.
- Billy Budd, sailor; an inside narrative, edited (1975)
- The Twentieth Century. Viking Press. 1978. ISBN 9780140150889.
- Critical Essays on Herman Melville's Typee. Hall. 1982. ISBN 9780816184453.
- Power and conflict in continuing professional education, edited (1983)
- Critical Essays on F Scott Fitzgerald's Tender Is the Night. Hall. 1986. ISBN 9780816184446.
- Contexts for Hawthorne: The Marble Faun and the Politics of Openness and Closure in American Literature. University of Illinois Press. 1991. ISBN 9780252018190.
- The Learning Society: Continuing Education at NYU, Michigan, and UC Berkeley, 1946-1991. UC Berkeley. 1993.
- Tender is the Night: The Broken Universe. Twayne Publishers. 1994. ISBN 9780805783803.
- F. Scott Fitzgerald in the twenty-first century, edited with Jackson R. Bryer and Ruth Prigozy (2003)
- [Unpublished, 600-page memoir]

== See also ==
- Herman Melville
- F. Scott Fitzgerald
