= Barnaby, New Brunswick =

Community in New Brunswick, Canada

Coordinates: 46.821971°N 65.487356°W

Location of Barnaby in New Brunswick

Barnaby is a Canadian community in Northumberland County, New Brunswick. It is located south of the city of Miramichi.

== See also ==
- List of communities in New Brunswick

== Border Communities ==
- Acadie Siding
- Pleasant Ridge
- Collette
