= Collette, New Brunswick =

Rural community in New Brunswick, Canada

Coordinates: 46.782056°N 65.446667°W

Location of Colette in New Brunswick

Collette is a small rural community in the Northumberland County region of New Brunswick, Canada. The community is settled halfway between Miramichi, and Moncton, off the Route 126, and near Nouvelle-Arcadie.

The former local service district of Collette took its name from the community.

== History ==
The community is named for Hosea Collette, a man who settled in the Northumberland County region in the early twentieth century. Home to the Trappist and Trappistine Monasteries, and place with Msgr. Marcel Richard settled until his death in 1915.

The community is home to many French families, Babineau, Doucette, Pitre, Gallant, Doiron and Vautour. The community once one church, that served the area which opened on November 28, 1954 and it was known as Notre Dame de Fatima Roman Catholic Church, or more commonly as "Our Lady of Fatima" which housed the church, a community centre, as well as a slumber room for people who have died from the parish. It held its final mass on September 12, 2021, and was demolished on July 14, 2022. The community centre still remains. Each July, the community hosts a Picnic on the Church grounds. The community is home to nearly three hundred people, mostly young and older families. The present parish priest, who also tends to the church, is Father Wislais Simervil. He is also a priest at Saint Francois de Sales Roman Catholic Church in Nouvelle-Arcadie and Imaculée Conception Roman Catholic Church in Acadieville.

The community was once home to a sawmill and home to the Sacre Coeur Convent, now demolished. The nearest hospital or medical treatment centers provided to the community are the Miramichi Regional Hospital, Rogersville Medical Clinic, Moncton City Hospital or Dr. Georges L. Dumont Regional Hospital. The community is situated and near the Barnaby River area, about 9 miles from the community, and can be accessed from the West Collette Road, through the woods and connecting near Semiwagan Ridge. Via Rail has a main line through the community which is the main CN Rail system.

== Demographics ==
In the 2021 Census of Population conducted by Statistics Canada, Collette had a population of 420 living in 193 of its 212 total private dwellings, a change of −7.9% from its 2016 population of 456. With a land area of 61.27 km^{2} (23.66 sq mi), it had a population density of 6.9/km^{2} (17.8/sq mi) in 2021.

== Border communities ==
- Nouvelle-Arcadie
- Murray Settlement
- Young Ridge
- Barnaby
- Rosaireville

== See also ==
- List of communities in New Brunswick
