= Thomas Barnaby =

Micmac chief

- Born: March 7, 1841 along the Miramichi River near Newcastle
- Died: March 23, 1907 (aged 66); Eel Ground

Thomas Barnaby (17 March 1841 – 23 March 1907) was a Micmac chief from the Eel Ground First Nation band near Newcastle, New Brunswick.

Barnaby was instrumental in the change from a family tradition of leadership in the band to elected leadership. Despite a provision in the Indian Act of 1876 for elections, the traditional chief, John Julian, persevered until his death. In an election in 1888, Thomas was elected by a one-vote margin.

He was considered to have given enlightened leadership to the band and was often consulted by the district Indian superintendent after he had lost a subsequent election. There is no written record from the band's point of view, but a large attendance at his funeral would give testament to his standing within the community.
