= Gallant =

Gallant may refer to:

- Gallant (singer) (born 1991), American singer and songwriter
- Gallant (surname), people with the surname
- Gallant, Alabama, United States
- A gallant, or a man exhibiting courage
- A gallant, a member of the Parliament of the United Kingdom who holds a gallantry award
- Goofus and Gallant, characters in a Highlights for Children magazine cartoon feature

== Ships ==
- HMS Gallant (H59), a G-class destroyer
- USS Gallant (MSO-489), an Aggressive-class minesweeper

== See also ==
- Galant style
