= Tabusintac 9 =

Coordinates: 47°20′55″N 65°09′06″W

Tabusintac 9 is the Statistics Canada census area designation for what is properly termed the Tabusintac Indian Reserve No. 9, which is an Indian reserve under the governance of the Burnt Church First Nation of the Mi'kmaq people. It is 3268.7 ha. in size and is adjacent to the town of Tabusintac.

== See also ==
- List of Indian Reserves in Canada § New Brunswick
