= Notre Dame du Calvaire Abbey =

Monastery in Nouvelle-Arcadie, New Brunswick, Canada

Coordinates: 46.765309°N 65.444741°W

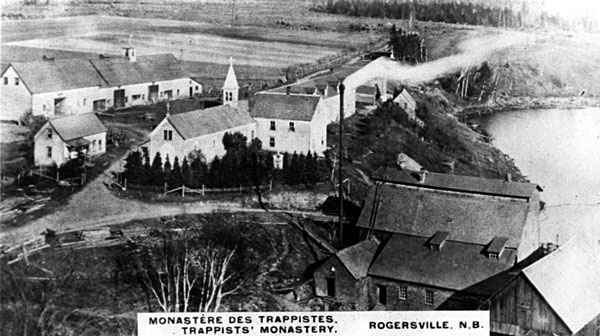
The monastery in 1920

Notre-Dame du Calvaire Abbey is a Trappist/Cistercian monastery located in Nouvelle-Arcadie, New Brunswick, Canada.

In 1902, in response to the anticlerical movement in France, the parish priest (Father Marcel‑François Richard) of Rogersville, invited the Cistercian monks of the Abbey of Our Lady of Bonnecombe, in the diocese of Rodez and Vabres, Aveyron, France, to establish a refuge at Rogersville. Father Richard donated a large piece of land, including a few buildings, to the monks. The founding monks (Dom Antoine Piana (1859‑1938), superior; Father Jean Laguet (1868‑1916); Brother Marcellin Maillebuau (1867‑1944); Brother Paul Ratier (1872‑1927); Brother Raphaël Boudet (born in 1871); and Brother Hippolyte Bru (1884‑1954)) arrived in October 1902.

In 1903 the monastery was incorporated by an Act of the Legislative Assembly of New Brunswick under the name The Model Farm and Agricultural School of Rogersville, N.B.

In 1904, a group of Cistercian nuns emigrated to Canada establishing a second monastery, Notre-Dame de l'Assomption Abbey, 3.5 km south of the Notre-Dame du Calvaire Abbey.

The monastery was officially closed in May 2024 due to low recruitment. At the time of closure, the monastery had three monks.
