= Fontenot =

Surname

Fontenot is a surname of a number of American people, and may refer to:

- Al Fontenot (born 1970), Chicago Bears defensive lineman
- Canray Fontenot (1922–1995), musician
- Jerry Fontenot (born 1966) football center
- Herman Fontenot (born 1963) football running back
- Heulette Fontenot (1961–2019) Louisiana politician and documentary film maker
- Terry Fontenot (born 1980), American football scout and former player
- Mary Alice Fontenot (1910–2003), children's books author
- Mike Fontenot (born 1980), baseball player
- Therrian Fontenot (born 1981), Philadelphia Eagles cornerback
