= Guidry =

Guidry is a surname. Notable people with the surname include:

- Brian Guidry (born 1968), American painter
- Carolyn Tyler Guidry (born 1937), American bishop
- Dick Guidry (1929–2014), American businessman
- Greg G. Guidry (born 1961), American lawyer and jurist
- Greg Guidry (1950–2003), American singer
- James Guidry (born 1967), American football player
- Javelin Guidry (born 1998), American football player
- Mark Guidry (born 1959), American jockey
- Mickey Guidry (born 1966), American football player
- Paul Guidry (born 1944), American football player
- Richard Guidry (1949–2008), American academic
- Robert E. Guidry, American military personnel and businessperson
- Ron Guidry (born 1950), American baseball player
- Stephen Guidry (American football) (born 1997), American football player

== See also ==
- Carlette Guidry-White (born 1968), American sprinter
