= Strathadam, New Brunswick =

Coordinates: 46.967339°N 65.66833°W

Strathadam is a community in the Canadian province of New Brunswick, located 10 kilometres (6.2 mi) outside of Miramichi.

== See also ==
- List of communities in New Brunswick
