= Esgenoôpetitj Indian Reserve No. 14 =

Coordinates: 47°12′31.4″N 65°8′15.9″W

Location of Burnt Church 14 in New Brunswick

Esgenoôpetitj (2016 population: 1,079) is a Mi'kmaq Indian reserve in Northumberland County, New Brunswick, Canada. Prior to July 11, 2012, the Indian reserve was named Burnt Church 14.

It belongs to the Burnt Church First Nation, of whom about two-thirds of the population live on reserve.

The reserve is located on Miramichi Bay, near the mouth of the Miramichi River.

== Demographics ==
Population trend

Census	Population	Change (%)
2016	1,179	▲12.7%
2011	1,046	▼6.6%
2006	1,120	▲1.1%
2001	1,002	▲22.8%
1996	816	N/A

Mother tongue (2016)

Language	Population	Pct (%)
English only	735	62.6%
French only	50	4.3%
Mi'kmaq	375	31.9
Other languages	15	1.3%

== See also ==
- List of communities in New Brunswick
