= Ilya Galant =

Russian historian(1867–1941)

- Илья Галант
- Born: Eliyahu Vulfovich Galant; February 25, 1867; Nezhin, Chernigov Governorate, Russian Empire
- Died: September 29 or 30, 1941 (aged 74); Kiev, Ukrainian SSR, Soviet Union
- Cause of death: Execution
- Occupations: Writer; Educator
- Years active: 1895–1929

Ilya Vladimirovich (né Eliyahu Vulfovich) Galant (Russian: Илья Владимирович Галант; February 25, 1867 – September 29 or 30, 1941) was a Russian historiographer, archaeographer, educator, and writer on the history of the Jews in Ukraine.

== Biography ==
Galant was born into a Jewish family in the city of Niezhin. His brother, Hirsh, was a pharmacist in Vyazniki, Vladimir Oblast. He received a religious Jewish education, and later with the assistance of professors from the Nizhyn Historical and Philological Institute, he took up independent studies in the library, and was accepted as a member of the Nizhyn Historical and Philological Society.

In the early 1890s, he moved to Kiev. From 1910 onwards, he taught Jewish history and Judaism in secondary schools, becoming a member of the Kiev Society of Rabbis. He studied documents of Jewish history located at the Saint Vladimir Imperial University of Kiev. He published articles in publications Kievan Antiquity (Russian: Киевская старина), Orient (Russian: Восход), and Future (Russian: Будущность), including many on the history of the Jews. He used many of the connections he had made with the elites in his lived cities to gain access to rare documents to do research for his writings. These included limited-access archival documents, as well as documents that were obscure and not well known among historians.

In 1919, he helped found the Jewish Historical and Archaeographic Commission at the All-Ukrainian Academy of Sciences, and later headed the organization from 1924 to 1929, nicknamed "The Galant Commission". He prepared and published two collections of its works in the Ukrainian language. His decision to publish in Ukrainian was criticized internationally for adding putting another language into rotation for publication on Jewish history, but many Ukrainians supported the decision. In the late 1920s, many Jewish members of the Bolsheviks began to criticize their work, along with the Department of Jewish Culture at the All-Ukrainian Academy of Science. In 1929, he was dismissed from the Academy after his commission's liquidation.

On either September 29 or 30, 1941, he was executed along 33,000 other Jews in Ukraine at the Babi Yar Massacre.

== Historical work and reception ==
Galant was a large believer in Ukrainian-Jewish unity and sought to dispel what he considered "myths" of universal hatred between the two peoples through history. He sought to unify both groups together through revisionism of the history of Jews in the historical regions that made up Ukraine. He became largely unpopular with Soviet authorities for his ideologies of nationalism (both for Jews in Russia as well as that of Zionism) and unified minorities and was branded bourgeois for it. He was unique in his position that he desired to create a specific Ukrainian-Jewish nationalism. Many of his works concerned instances of blood libel and other incidents of antisemitism in Eastern Europe, and he included many archival materials that he acquired from his research in various government institutions.

In a 1910 response to Galant's brochure on the Pale of Settlement, Leo Tolstoy, shortly before his death, gave support for some of Galant's work, stating:

I have read your brochure, and it seems to me that the injustice of establishing the Pale of Settlement is explained in the brochure with complete conviction for people who are accessible to these arguments of common cense. My attitude towards the decrees by which people are prohibited from enjoying the natural rights of every living being and living on the surface of the globe where it is convenient or desirable for them, there can be nothing but a negative, since I have always considered and do consider the admission of any violence by man against man to be the source of all th troubles experienced by humanity. I cannot help but consider violence in restricting the place of residence to be, moreover, extremely absurd and not productive in achieving its goal.

== Commemoration ==
In October 2026, German family minister Karin Prien visited Kyiv and installed a Stolperstein for Galant.

== Works ==
- Галант, Илья Владимирович (1895). Молитва въ память уманской рѣзни и письмо, касающееся того же события [Prayer in memory of the Uman massacre and a letter concerning the same event] (PDF) (in Russian). Київ: Г.Т.Корчакъ-Новицкаго. OCLC 236191201.
- Галант, Илья Владимирович (1897). Къ исторіи поселенія евреевъ въ Польшѣ и Руси вообще и въ Подоліи въ частности [On the history of Jewish settlement in Poland and Russia in general and in Podolia in particular] (in Russian). С-Петербургъ: А.Е. Ландау. OCLC 236191196.
- Галант, Илья Владимирович (1903). К исторіи благотворительных еврейских учрежденій на югѣ Россіи [On the History of Jewish Charitable Institutions in the South of Russia] (in Russian). Кіевъ: Центральная. OCLC 236190744.
- Галант, Илья Владимирович (1908). Къ исторіи Уманской рѣзни 1768 года [On the History of the Uman Region in 1768] (in Russian). Кіевъ: А.О. Штерензона. OCLC 236191397.
- Галант, Илья Владимирович (1909). Арендовали-ли евреи церкви на Украйнѣ? [Did the Jews rent Churches in Ukraine?] (in Russian). Работникъ. OCLC 236191387.
- Галант, Илья Владимирович (1911). Ритуальный процессъ въ Дунайгородѣ въ 1748 г [Ritual process in Dunaigorod in 1748] (in Russian). Кіевъ: Работникъ. OCLC 236191389.
- Галант, Илья Владимирович (1912). Жертвы ритуальнаго обвиненія въ Заславѣ в 1747 г. : по актамъ центрального архива [Victims of ritual accusation in Zaslov in 1747: according to the records of the central archive] (in Russian). Кіевъ: Работник. OCLC 236191396.
- Галант, Илья Владимирович (1915). Черта еврейской осѣдлости [The trait of Jewish alienation] (in Russian). Москва. OCLC 236190763.
- Галант, Илья Владимирович (1924). Два ритуальных процесса : по актам Киевского центрального архива [Two ritual processes: according to the acts of the Kiev Central Archive] (in Russian). Kiev: Киев-Печать. OCLC 970909755.
- Галант, Илья Владимирович (1927). Київські проекти землевпорядкування жидів 1841 року : з документів архиву київського генерал-губернатора [Kyiv land management projects of Jews in 1841: from documents of the archive of the Kyiv Governor-General] (in Russian). OCLC 236191199.
