= John Pitre =

American artist

John Pitre (born 1942 in New York City) is an American visionary art painter based in Hawaii.

One of Pitre's best known paintings is A New Dawn, a 1965 work which shows a modern human reduced to the status of a caveman in the midst of smoldering urban ruins. This painting, in the weeks after the September 11, 2001 attacks more than thirty five years later, was seen by one family as a foreshadowing of what came to be known as the Ground Zero of those events, despite the painting being conceived as a statement on the escalation of nuclear weapons. In 2004, the owner of the original painting, which was valued in 1997 at $1.7 million, offered A New Dawn in trade for a £1 million house on the London real estate market.

Pitre's art addresses issues such as ecology, overpopulation, responsibility for stewardship of the Earth, the quest to understand the mysteries of the universe, and the fragility of life and of relationships. Posters of his paintings were very popular in the 1960s and 1970s and one of them, a print of his painting Restrictions, has sold several million copies.

Pitre studied at the Art Students League of New York.

== Inventions ==
Pitre is also an inventor. Pitre invented the Range of Motion (ROM) and Time Works exercise equipment. The American Council on Exercise debunked Pitre's claims of the machine's efficacy. With decorative tile artist Thomas Deir, who was his apprentice at the time, Pitre co-invented Genesis Artist Colors, a synthetic oil paint which remains wet and malleable until it is heat cured.

Pitre is also a diver, an environmentalist, the founder and director of Natural Power Concepts, and pilots helicopters.

== Books ==
- John Pitre: The Art and Works of a Visionary. Barbara T. Erskine and Roger Jellinek, eds. Honolulu: Pitre Fine Arts, 1996. ISBN 0-9648183-0-2.
