= Nowlanville, New Brunswick =

Neighbourhood in New Brunswick, Canada

Coordinates: 46°56′39″N 65°31′35″W

Nowlanville is a neighbourhood in the Canadian city of Miramichi, New Brunswick located mainly on Route 126.

== See also ==
- List of neighbourhoods in Miramichi, New Brunswick

== Border communities ==
- Barnaby River
