= Notre-Dame de l'Assomption Abbey =

Monastery in New Brunswick, Canada

Coordinates: 46.7554°N 65.4402°W

Notre-Dame de l'Assomption Abbey is a Trappist/Cistercian monastery located in Nouvelle-Arcadie, New Brunswick, Canada.

== History ==
Due to religious persecution, a group of Cistercian nuns emigrated to Canada in 1904, from a Cistercian monastery located in Vaise (Lyon), France (which had been founded in 1817) in order to reestablish their monastic community in Rogersville. Their new abbey was established 3.5 kilometres south of Notre Dame du Calvaire Abbey, a monastery established by another group of Trappist monks who had arrived in 1902.

The nuns arrived in May and took possession of their new provisional monastery - a small farmhouse of six rooms for 19 people - on June 10 of that year. Those early years were full of struggles as the nuns adapted to the Canadian climate, a rural lifestyle and the daunting task of building up a monastery from the humble beginnings of that farm house.

With the aid of the local people and their pastor, Mgr. Marcel François Richard, the nuns not only persevered but were eventually joined by many Acadian women desirous of the monastic lifestyle and, little by little, a flourishing monastic community was established, replete with an Abbey church built in 1922, the present monastic complex built in 1950 and a retreat house for women opened in 1970.

Over the years, the nuns gained their livelihood through different endeavours: at first by making Mass wine, then through the fabrication of Altar Breads.

In 2024, the Superior is Mère Genevieve-Marie Fontaine.
