= Big Hole, New Brunswick =

Settlement in Northumberland County, New Brunswick

Coordinates: 46.999°N 65.824°W

Location of Big Hole in New Brunswick

Big Hole is a settlement in Northumberland County, New Brunswick. It is located 5.56 km south of Sevogle.

== History ==
In 1871, Big Hole had a population of 50.

== See also ==
- List of communities in New Brunswick
