= Tabusintac, New Brunswick =

Coordinates: 47°19′39″N 65°0′41″W

Location of Tabusintac in New Brunswick

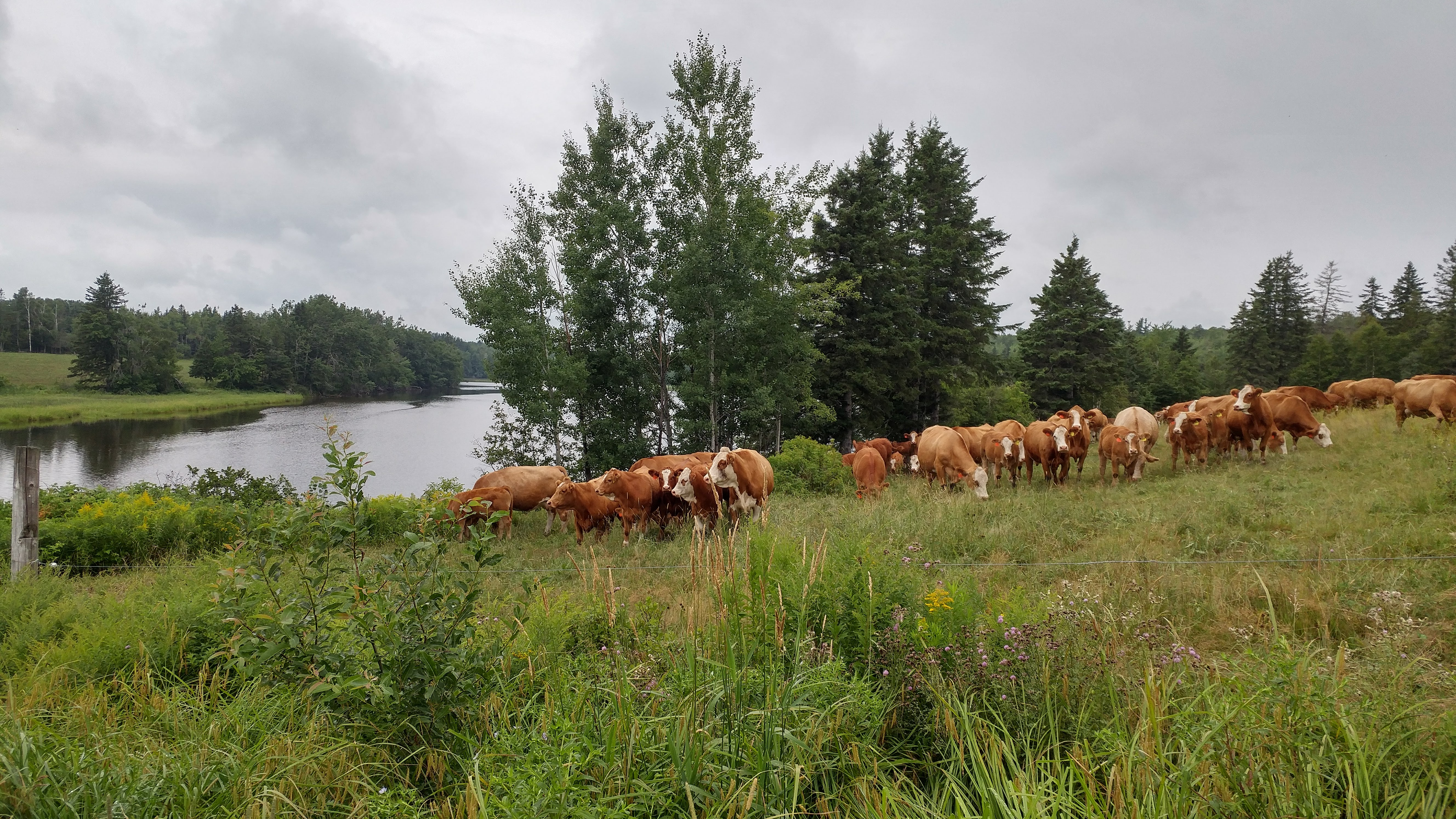
Cows grazing by a river near Tabusintac

Tabusintac is an unincorporated community in Northumberland County in the Canadian province of New Brunswick. It is situated on the north side of Miramichi Bay.

The name was also used by the former local service district of Tabusintac, which also included other communities.

== Demographics ==
In the 2021 Census of Population conducted by Statistics Canada, Tabusintac had a population of 852 living in 388 of its 454 total private dwellings, a change of -1% from its 2016 population of 861. With a land area of 152.13 km^{2} (58.74 sq mi), it had a population density of 5.6/km^{2} (14.5/sq mi) in 2021.

== See also ==
- List of communities in New Brunswick
- Tabusintac 9 (Indian Reserve)
