= Sheldrake Island =

Island in New Brunswick, Canada

Native name: l'Île aux Becs-Scies
- Interactive map of Sheldrake Island

Geography
- Location: Miramichi River
- Coordinates: 47.0885731°N 65.3219079°W
- Area: 32 acres (13 ha)
- Highest elevation: 5 m (16 ft)

Administration
- Canada
- County: Northumberland County
- Parish: Alnwick Parish

Demographics
- Ethnic groups: Acadians

Sheldrake Island (French: l'Île aux Becs-Scies) is an island in New Brunswick, Canada, known for being the site of New Brunswick's first lazaretto. It is located only 8 miles from Chatham, on the Miramichi River.

== History ==
The lazaretto was established in 1844, on the site of a cholera quarantine station from 1832. 44 lepers were landed on July 19, 1844, the majority being Acadians, from the Tracadie-Neguac area.

The island also contained housing for typhus patients, but the lepers objected to this. The arrival of a ship from Ireland with many typhus and smallpox patients forced them to be moved to Middle Island.

Dr. Alexander Key, Secretary to the Board of Health for Northumberland and Gloucester, was the official in charge. The buildings were filthy with vermin. Soon the lepers lost faith in Dr. Key's remedies and began escaping. By December 18, there were only 20 left.

The board recommended punishment and locking them up. The escaped lepers were hunted down and brought back in handcuffs. The lazaretto was soon surrounded by a spiked palisade 12 ft high.

The inmates burned the buildings in October 1845. The quarantine station was reopened after 1847.

The remaining inmates were moved to a new lazaretto in Tracadie in 1849.

A temporary quarantine station was ordered to be erected on the island in March 1848. Disagreements over the matter meant that the buildings were not moved from Middle Island until April 3. A brawl erupted on the island between representatives of the Board of Health and Justices of the Peace over the matter. As a result, the buildings stayed on the ice until the order was cancelled and the buildings were moved back.

== Current uses ==
The island is mostly uninhabited, except for an historic lighthouse, known as Sheldrake Island Front Range Light.

A leper's cemetery is on the island, containing 15 graves.

== In fiction ==
- Kathy Reichs' novel Bones to Ashes involves Sheldrake Island and its history as a plot point.

== Musical Tribute ==
- Canadian folk singer Shane Pendergast's 2022 album The House Before the Bridge includes a musical tribute to these events called "Sheldrake Island.".

== See also ==
- List of communities in New Brunswick
- List of islands of New Brunswick
