= Eel Ground, New Brunswick =

Community in New Brunswick, Canada

Coordinates: 46.969°N 67.635°W

Location of Eel Ground in New Brunswick

Eel Ground is a community in the Canadian province of New Brunswick.

== See also ==
- List of communities in New Brunswick
