= Kirkwood, New Brunswick =

Human settlement in New Brunswick, Canada

Coordinates: 46°54′8.75″N 65°36′59.51″W

Kirkwood is a Canadian rural community in Nelson parish, Northumberland County, New Brunswick. It is situated along the Southwest Miramichi River, near Millerton.

== See also ==
- List of communities in New Brunswick
