= Jennifer Trahan =

American legal scholar and academic

- Occupations: Legal academic and researcher

Academic background
- Education: A.B. J.D. LL.M
- Alma mater: Amherst College; New York University School of Law; Columbia Law School

Academic work
- Institutions: N.Y.U. Center for Global Affairs

Jennifer Trahan is an American legal scholar and academic. She is a Clinical Professor at New York University's Center for Global Affairs and directs their Concentration in International Law and Human Rights.

Trahan's book, Existing Legal Limits to Security Council Veto Power in the Face of Atrocity Crimes is the winner of the 2020 book of the year award by the American Branch of the International Law Association.

Trahan is also the author of numerous book chapters, law review articles, op-eds, as well as legal digests, including, "Genocide, War Crimes and Crimes against Humanity: A Digest of the Case Law of the International Criminal Tribunal for Rwanda", and "Genocide, War Crimes and Crimes against Humanity: A Topical Digest of the Case Law of the International Criminal Tribunal for the former Yugoslavia".

Trahan is one of the U.S. representatives to the Use of Force Committee of the International Law Association, and holds various positions with the Association's American Branch, including Co-Director of Studies and Co-Chair of the International Criminal Court Committee.

== Early life and education ==
Trahan graduated from Amherst College in 1985 and received her J.D. degree from New York University School of Law in 1990. She earned her LL.M. degree, concentrating on International Law, from Columbia Law School in 2002.

She is the daughter of Elizabeth Welt Trahan, formerly a professor at the Monterey Institute of International Studies and a Holocaust survivor, and Donald H. Trahan, formerly a mathematician and professor at the Monterey Naval Postgraduate School in Monterey, California.

== Career ==
Earlier in her career, Trahan spent ten years in private practice as a Litigation Associate at the New York City law firm Schulte Roth & Zabel. Trahan later served as counsel to the International Justice Program of Human Rights Watch.

Trahan was appointed by NYU Center for Global Affairs as a Clinical Assistant Professor in 2009. She was promoted to Clinical Associate Professor in 2011 and Clinical Professor in 2018. At NYU Center for Global Affairs, Trahan directs the concentration in International Law and Human Rights. Trahan has also lectured for several years at Salzburg Law School's summer program on International Criminal Law, Humanitarian Law, and Human Rights Law.

== Research ==
Trahan has conducted research on topics of international law, international criminal law, and international justice, including on the crime of aggression, war crimes prosecutions in the former Yugoslavia, the legacy of the International Criminal Tribunal for the former Yugoslavia, complementarity under the International Criminal Court's Rome Statute, the genocide in Darfur, the Iraqi High Tribunal, veto use and atrocity crimes, the U.S. relationship to the International Criminal Court, and cyber-attacks as crimes under the International Criminal Court's Rome Statute.

=== Crime of aggression ===
Trahan has published extensively on the International Criminal Court's crime of aggression, including on the negotiations that led to the adoption of a definition of the crime of aggression at the International Criminal Court's Review Conference in Kampala, Uganda; the difference between the crime of aggression and humanitarian intervention; the negotiations that led to the activation of the International Criminal Court's jurisdiction over the crime of aggression; and the Security Council and referrals of the crime of aggression.

=== Vetoes and atrocity crimes ===
Trahan's book, Existing Legal Limits to Security Council Veto Power in the Face of Atrocity Crimes was published in 2020, and examines the legality of the use of the veto power by a permanent member of the UN Security Council to block the Security Council's actions while there are ongoing atrocity crimes or the serious risk of these crimes occurring. Trahan examines such vetoes, which block a resolution that otherwise had the required number of votes for it to pass, in light of legal obligations related to jus cogens, the United Nations Charter, and fundamental treaty obligations. She also traces the drafting history of the veto power, overviews the use of the veto power including while there are ongoing atrocity crimes, and examines the "voluntary veto restraint initiatives" that have been pursued to date, which Trahan argues have proven insufficient because not all permanent members join them. The "UN Vetoes initiative" is related to the argument of Trahan's 2020 book and other academic writings.

== Awards and honors ==
- 2020 – ABILA Book of the Year Award for Existing Legal Limits to Security Council Veto Power in the Face of Atrocity Crimes, American Branch of the International Law Association

== Publications ==
=== Books ===
- Genocide, War Crimes, and Crimes against Humanity: Topical Digests of the Case Law of the International Criminal Tribunal for Rwanda and the International Criminal Tribunal for the Former Yugoslavia ISBN 9781564322951
- Genocide, War Crimes, and Crimes against Humanity: A Topical Digest of the Case Law of the International Criminal Tribunal for the Former Yugoslavia (hrw.org)
- Genocide, War Crimes, and Crimes against Humanity: A Digest of the Case Law of the International Criminal Tribunal for Rwanda
- Existing Legal Limits to Security Council Veto Power in the Face of Atrocity Crimes ISBN 9781108487016

=== Selected book chapters ===
- "The Crime of Aggression and the International Criminal Court," in Seeking Accountability for the Unlawful Use of Force, ed. by Leila Sadat (2018)
- "Examining the Benchmarks by which to Evaluate the ICTY's Legacy," in The Legacy of Ad Hoc Tribunals in International Criminal Law: Assessing the ICTY's and ICTR's Most Significant Legal Accomplishments, ed. by Milena Sterio and Michael Scharf (2019)
- "The Legacy of the ICTY: The Three-Tiered Approach to Justice in Bosnia-Herzegovina and Benchmarks for Measuring Success," in Legacies of the International Criminal Tribunal for the Former Yugoslavia: A Multidisciplinary Account, ed. by Carsten Stahn, Carmel Agius, Serge Brammertz, John Hocking and Colleen Rohan (2020)
- "Judicial Reform and Rebuilding," in Handbook on Post-Conflict State Building, ed. by Paul Williams and Milena Sterio (2020)
- "The Assembly of States Parties," in The Elgar Companion to the International Criminal Court, ed. by Valerie Oosterveld and Margaret M. deGuzman (2020)
- "International Justice and the International Criminal Court at a Critical Juncture," in The Future of Global Affairs: Managing Disruptions, Discontinuities, and Destruction, ed. by Chris Ankersen & WPS Sidhu (Palgrave Macmillan 2020)
