= Sevogle, New Brunswick =

Coordinates: 47°5′N 65°50′W

Location of Sevogle in New Brunswick

Sevogle is a community in the Canadian province of New Brunswick. It is located near the mouth of the Big Sevogle River, 5.56 km North of Big Hole, and consequently is visited by hundreds of tourists in the summer for fishing. Sevogle is home to a plethora of wildlife including a large population of deer and salmon.

== History ==
William Francis Ganong identified the Mi'kmaq name for Sevogle as Sawogelk.

A post office was established here in 1879, which closed in 1951.

== See also ==
- List of communities in New Brunswick
