= Chelmsford, New Brunswick =

Community in New Brunswick, Canada

Coordinates: 46.8795°N 65.651278°W

Location of Chelmsford in New Brunswick

Chelmsford is a community in the Canadian province of New Brunswick. It is situated in Nelson, a parish of Northumberland County.

== See also ==
- List of communities in New Brunswick
