= Murray Settlement, New Brunswick =

Coordinates: 46°50′29″N 65°26′30″W

Murray Settlement is a community in the Canadian province of New Brunswick located mainly on Route 126.

== See also ==
- List of communities in New Brunswick

== Border communities ==
- Collette
- Barnaby River
