= Millerton, New Brunswick =

Coordinates: 46.90106°N 65.63359°W

Millerton
- Interactive map of Millerton
- Country: Canada
- Province: New Brunswick
- County: Northumberland
- ZIP Code: 506

Millerton is a rural community in Northumberland County, New Brunswick, Canada.

Situated on the Southwest Miramichi River, Millerton lies on the river's north bank, several kilometres upstream from the city of Miramichi.

== History ==
The community had rail service at least as late as 1936.

== See also ==
- List of communities in New Brunswick
