= Lower Newcastle-Russellville =

Coordinates: 47.081°N 65.394°W

Location of Lower Newcastle in New Brunswick

Lower Newcastle-Russellville was a local service district in New Brunswick. It is now part of the Greater Miramichi rural district.

== Demographics ==
In the 2021 Census of Population conducted by Statistics Canada, Lower Newcastle-Russellville part B had a population of 369 living in 171 of its 198 total private dwellings, a change of 4.8% from its 2016 population of 352. With a land area of 18.77 km^{2} (7.25 sq mi), it had a population density of 19.7/km^{2} (50.9/sq mi) in 2021.

== See also ==
- List of communities in New Brunswick
