= Oak Point - Bartibog Bridge, New Brunswick =

Coordinates: 47.111655°N 65.308055°W

Location of Bartibog Bridge in New Brunswick

Oak Point - Bartibog Bridge is an unincorporated place in New Brunswick, Canada. It is recognized as a designated place by Statistics Canada and was a local service district.

== History ==
Two noted landmarks are the MacDonald Farm Provincial Historic Site, an 18th-century stone farmhouse built by Colonel Alexander MacDonald, an early pioneer in the Miramichi area. It is now a provincial historic site. A second is St Peter and St Paul's Church at Moody's Point, one of the earliest churches in the area, serving Scotch Catholics of the surrounding districts.

== Demographics ==
In the 2021 Census of Population conducted by Statistics Canada, Oak Point - Bartibog Bridge had a population of 272 living in 125 of its 175 total private dwellings, a change of 9.2% from its 2016 population of 249. With a land area of 20.75 km^{2} (8.01 sq mi), it had a population density of 13.1/km^{2} (34.0/sq mi) in 2021.

== See also ==
- List of communities in New Brunswick
