= Natoaganeg First Nation =

Natoaganeg First Nation Natuaqaneg (Mi'kmaq)
- Flag

- Location of Natoaganeg in New Brunswick
- Coordinates: 46°58′9.2″N 65°37′38.2″W
- Country: Canada
- Province: New Brunswick
- County: Northumberland County
- Established: 1783

Government
  - Chief: George Harold Ginnish
  - Council: Merrill Martin; Mike Simon; Wallace Francis; Alisha Sweezey; Tyler Patles; Willie Sark; Kyle Francis; Cody Narvey; Brian Simon; Kelvin Simonson
  - MP: Pat Finnigan (L)
  - Provincial Representatives: Rick Brewer (L); John W. Foran (L)

Area
  - Total: 28.23 km^{2} (10.90 sq mi)
- Lowest elevation: 0 m (0 ft)

Population (2012)
  - Total: 977
- Time zone: UTC-4 (Atlantic (AST))
  - Summer (DST): UTC-3 (ADT)
- Area code: 506 / 428
- NTS Map: 021I13
- Website: https://natoaganegfirstnation.ca

Natoaganeg First Nation (Mi'kmaq: Natuaqaneg), historically known as Eel Ground Band or Eel Ground First Nation, is a Mi'kmaw First Nation band government of 977 people located on the Miramichi River in northern New Brunswick, Canada. The community comprises three reserves (Eel Ground #2, Big Hole Tract #8 (south half), and Renous #12).

== History ==
Natoaganeg principally occupies lands adjoining the City of Miramichi, New Brunswick, and members of the two communities have no doubt interacted from the time of earliest European settlement. About 1648, Nicolas Denys, Sieur de Fronsac, established a fort and trading post nearby, "on the North side of the Miramichi, at the forks of the river". His son, Richard Denys, was placed in charge of the fort and trading post. In 1688 Richard describes the establishment as including about a dozen French and more than 500 Indians.

The band was officially recognised by the British in 1783, soon after the French defeat in the Seven Years' War.

No doubt the First Nation population had long preceded Denys' "establishment", and present-day inhabitants of Natoaganeg would largely be descended from Richard Denys' immediate neighbours. For the Mi'kmaq, the nearby junction of the Northwest and Main Southwest branches of the Miramichi River had long served as a natural meeting point.

== Notable people ==
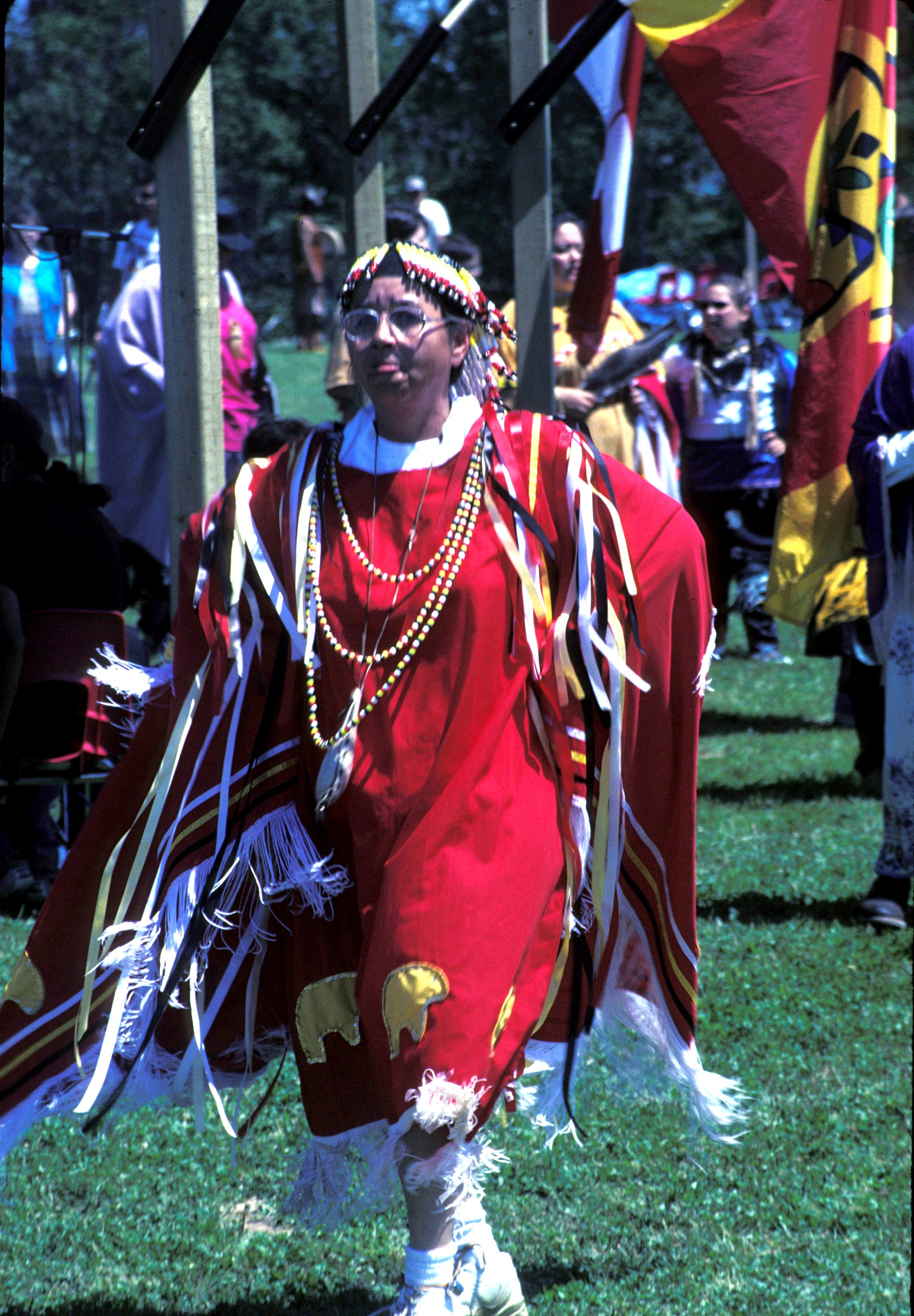
Dancer at 2000 Pow-wow hosted by Eel Ground First Nation (IR Walker 2000)

- Thomas Barnaby - Chief (1888–94)

== See also ==
- List of communities in New Brunswick
- List of First Nations in New Brunswick
- Natoaganeg First Nation
