= Gallant (surname) =

Gallant is a surname. Notable people with the surname include:

- A. Ronald Gallant (born 1942), American econometrician
- Brett Gallant (born 1990), Canadian curler
- Brian Gallant (born 1982), Canadian Liberal politician
- Cheryl Gallant (born 1960), Canadian Conservative politician
- Christopher Gallant (born 1992), American singer-songwriter known by the mononym Gallant
- Corinne Gallant (1922–2018), Canadian philosophy professor and feminist
- Gary William Gallant (born 1972), Canadian professional wrestler who wrestles under the ring name Gary Williams
- Gerard Gallant (born 1963), Canadian ice hockey coach and retired player
- Gord Gallant (born 1950), Canadian retired ice hockey player
- Hubert Gallant (born 1955), Canadian retired professional wrestler
- John Gallant (born 1978), Canadian lacrosse player
- Jonathan Gallant (born 1976), Canadian rock bass guitarist.
- Karl Gallant, American congressional aide and lobbyist
- Lennie Gallant (born 1955), Canadian singer-songwriter
- Matt Gallant (born 1964), American television host
- Mavis Gallant (1922–2014), Canadian writer
- Patsy Gallant (born 1948), Canadian pop singer and musical theatre actress
- Peter Gallant (born 1958), Canadian curler
- Shannon Gallant (born 1986), Australian rugby league player
- Thomas Gallant (musician), American oboist
- Thomas Gallant (historian), American historian
- Yoav Gallant (born 1958), Israeli politician

Fictional characters:

- Felicia Gallant, a romance novelist in the TV Soap Opera Another World
- Michael Gallant, a medical doctor in the TV Series ER
- Malcolm Gallant, a character in American Horror Story: Apocalypse

== See also ==
- Galant (surname)
