= New Brunswick Route 117 =

Highway in New Brunswick

Route 117

Route information
- Maintained by New Brunswick Department of Transportation
- Length: 114 km (71 mi)
- Existed: 1965.–present

Major junctions
- North end: Route 8 / Route 126 in Miramichi
- South end: Route 11 / Route 480 in Saint-Louis

Location
- Country: Canada
- Province: New Brunswick
- Major cities: Miramichi

Highway system
- Provincial highways in New Brunswick; Former routes
← Route 116	→ Route 118

Route 117 is an East/West provincial highway in the Canadian province of New Brunswick. It mainly follows the Gulf of St. Lawrence north of Kouchibouguac National Park to the mouth of the Miramichi River. The highway runs from the Route 11 interchange near Saint-Louis de Kent and doubles back past Route 11 in Chatham, continuing concurrently with Route 8 until its terminus at the interchange with the King George Highway in Newcastle. The route has a length of approximately 114 kilometres and services small, otherwise isolated, rural communities. In these areas, the highway is often unofficially referred to as "Main Street". Within the City of Miramichi, the route is named Loggie Road, Wellington Street, University Avenue, and Airport Road.

== History ==
Route 117 was created in 1965 from parts of the former Routes 12 (between Nelson and Chatham) and 37 (between Chatham and Bay du Vin).

The Chatham bypass and Miramichi Bridge were completed in 1997, creating a high-speed controlled-access connector between Newcastle and Chatham in the City of Miramichi.

== Intersecting routes ==
From North to East to South to West:

- Concurrency with Route 8 begins at the interchange with King George Highway/Hennesy Street in Newcastle
- Roundabout junction with Route 126 and Water Street at Chatham Head
- Concurrency with Route 8 ends at the interchange with Route 11 in Chatham
- Route 134 in Kouchibouguac
- Route 11 in Kouchibouguac

== River crossings ==
- Bay du Vin River (Bay du Vin)
- Little Branch Black River (Black River Bridge)
- Black River (Black River Bridge)
- Napan River (Napan)
- Miramichi River (Miramichi) Miramichi Bridge

== Communities along the Route ==
- Saint-Louis,
- Kouchibouguac
- Pointe-Sapin
- Escuminac
- Baie-Sainte-Anne
- Hardwicke
- Gardiner Point
- Bay du Vin
- Miramichi Bay
- Black River Bridge
- Napan
- Miramichi

== See also ==
- List of New Brunswick provincial highways
