= Hardwicke Parish, New Brunswick =

Hardwicke
- Parish
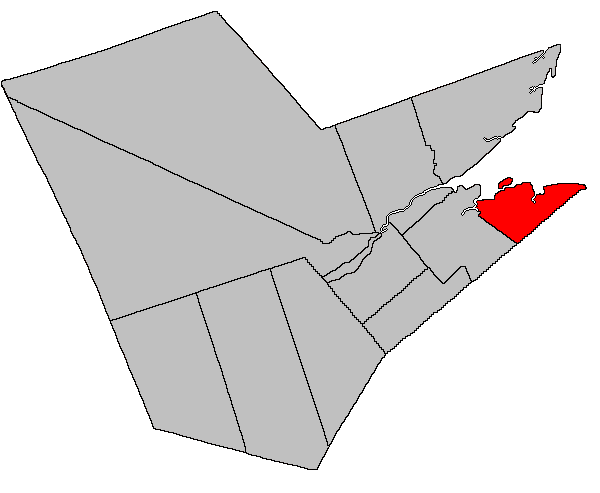
- Location within Northumberland County, New Brunswick
- Coordinates: 47.075°N 65.02°W
- Country: Canada
- Province: New Brunswick
- County: Northumberland
- Erected: 1852

Area
  - Land: 275.95 km^{2} (106.54 sq mi)

Population (2021)
  - Total: 2,203
  - Density: 8/km^{2} (21/sq mi)
  - Change 2016-2021: ▲0.1%
  - Dwellings: 1,181
- Time zone: UTC-4 (AST)
  - Summer (DST): UTC-3 (ADT)

Hardwicke is a geographic parish in Northumberland County, New Brunswick, Canada. (Note: The Territorial Division Act divides the province into 152 parishes, the cities of Saint John and Fredericton, and one town of Grand Falls. The Interpretation Act clarifies that parishes include any local government within their borders.)

For governance purposes it is part of the Greater Miramichi and Kent rural districts, which are members of the Greater Miramichi Regional Service Commission and Kent RSC respectively.

Prior to the 2023 governance reform, the parish was divided between the local service districts of Baie Ste. Anne, Black River-Hardwicke, Escuminac, and the parish of Hardwicke. The reforms put Black River-Hardwicke and the Miramichi Bay islands of the parish LSD in the Greater Miramichi rural district, with the remainder going to Kent.

== Origin of name ==
The parish may have been named in honour of the Earl of Hardwicke, a prominent commander in the Royal Navy at the time of its erection.

More frequently cited as the honouree is Benjamin Hardwick, a contributor to Church of England missions in the area; the extra letter in the name would then be due to clerical error.

== History ==
Hardwicke was erected in 1852 from the eastern part of Glenelg Parish.

== Boundaries ==
Hardwicke Parish is bounded:

- on the north by Bay du Vin, Miramichi Inner Bay, Miramichi Bay, and the Gulf of Saint Lawrence;
- on the east by the Gulf of Saint Lawrence;
- on the south by the Kent County line;
- on the west by a line, beginning on the county line at a point about 3.1 kilometres northeasterly of Hells Gate Lake, on the prolongation of the southwestern line of a Little Black River grant to Duncan McNaughton, then running northwesterly along the prolongation and the McNaughton grant to strike Little Black River at a point about 125 metres upstream of the Little Branch Road bridge, then down the Little Black River to its mouth, down the Big Black River to its mouth, and out into Bay du Vin;
- including Bay du Vin Island, Fox Island, and smaller islands in front of the parish.

=== Evolution of boundaries ===
When Hardwicke was erected the Kent County line at its eastern end ran from Point Escuminac through land, then the waters of Northumberland Strait, then through land again, leaving a small piece of Kent County isolated from the rest.

In 1888 this fragment of Kent County was transferred to Hardwicke.

== Communities ==
Communities at least partly within the parish.

- Auburnville
- Baie-Sainte-Anne
- Bay du Vin
- Bay du Vin Beach
- Eel River Bridge
- Escuminac
- Gregan
- Hardwicke
- Hardwood Settlement
- Hortons Creek
- Manuels
- Miramichi (Note: An unincorporated community that had its name long before the city of Miramichi was created.)
- Point Gardiner

== Bodies of water ==
Bodies of water (Note: Not including brooks, ponds or coves.) at least partly within the parish.

- Bay du Vin River
- Black River
- Eel River
- French River
- Little Black River
- Portage River
- Dennis Creek
- Hortons Creek
- Robichaud Creek
- Gulf of St. Lawrence
- Bay du Vin
- Miramichi Bay
- Baie Sainte-Anne
- Bay du Vin Harbour

== Islands ==
Islands at least partly within the parish.

- Bay du Vin Island
- Egg Island
- Fox Island
- Huckleberry Island

== Other notable places ==
Parks, historic sites, and other noteworthy places at least partly within the parish.

- Bay du Vin Island Protected Natural Area

== Demographics ==
=== Population ===
Population trend

Census	Population	Change (%)
2016	2,201	▼5.5%
2011	2,329	▼6.2%
2006	2,484	▼3.1%
2001	2,564	▼4.8%
1996	2,694	▼0.1%
1991	2,698	N/A

=== Language ===
Mother tongue (2016)

Language	Population	Pct (%)
French only	1,415	64.3%
English only	730	33.2%
Both English and French	45	2.0%
Other languages	10	0.5%

== See also ==
- List of parishes in New Brunswick
