= Chatham Parish, New Brunswick =

Chatham
- Parish
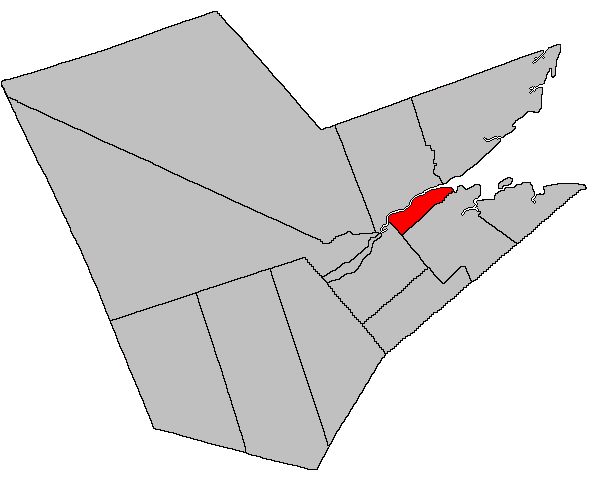
- Location within Northumberland County, New Brunswick
- Coordinates: 47.045°N 65.37°W
- Country: Canada
- Province: New Brunswick
- County: Northumberland
- Erected: 1814

Area
  - Land: 22.70 km^{2} (8.76 sq mi)

Population (2021)
  - Total: 527
  - Density: 23.2/km^{2} (60/sq mi)
  - Change 2016-2021: ▲3.1%
  - Dwellings: 269
- Time zone: UTC-4 (AST)
  - Summer (DST): UTC-3 (ADT)
- Figures do not include portion within the city of Miramichi

Chatham is a geographic parish in Northumberland County, New Brunswick, Canada. (Note: The Territorial Division Act divides the province into 152 parishes, the cities of Saint John and Fredericton, and one town of Grand Falls. The Interpretation Act clarifies that parishes include any local government within their borders.)

For governance purposes it is divided between the city of Miramichi and the Greater Miramichi rural district, both of which are members of the Greater Miramichi Regional Service Commission.

Prior to the 2023 governance reform, all of the parish outside the city formed the local service district of the parish of Chatham.

== Origin of name ==
The parish was named in honour of the Earl of Chatham, a title held at the time by General John Pitt, or for his father, former British Prime Minister Pitt the Elder.

The Provincial Archives of New Brunswick gives British Prime Minister Pitt the Younger as the inspiration of the name, but erroneously gives him the title of Earl of Chatham, which he never held. He died in office in 1806.

Six of the nine Northumberland County parishes erected simultaneously in 1814 were named for military figures of the Napoleonic Wars or British politicians associated with the military.

The strongest case for the parish's eponym might be General Pitt, who was Master-General of the Ordnance for most of the Napoleonic Wars and closely involved with planning Britain's coastal defenses. General Pitt was influential enough to be offered the Portugal command that later went to Arthur Wellesley, 1st Duke of Wellington.

== History ==
Chatham was erected in 1814 from Newcastle Parish but did not include the modern Douglasfield and Chatham Head areas, which were in neighbouring Nelson Parish until 1850.

== Boundaries ==
Chatham Parish is bounded:

- on the northwest and north by the Miramichi River;
- on the east by Napan Bay;
- on the south by a line beginning at the mouth of Napan River and running upstream to the westernmost corner of a grant to Henry Coils in Glenelg Parish, about 300 metres east of the junction of Searle Road and North Napan Road and about 400 metres north of the junction of Hannah Hill Road and Weldfield Collette Road, then running south 68º west (Note: By the magnet of 1850, when declination in the area was between 20º and 21º west of north. The Territorial Division Act clause referring to magnetic direction bearings was omitted in the 1952 and 1973 Revised Statutes.) to a point about 375 metres east of Sutton Road and about 75 metres north of Carding Mill Brook;
- on the southwest, beginning north of Carding Mill Brook, then running northwesterly along the prolongation of the southwestern line of a grant to William Brown Sr. and the grant itself to a cove northeasterly of the junction of Rasche Street and St. Patrick's Drive, then into the Miramichi River;
- including Middle Island in the Miramichi.

=== Evolution of boundaries ===
In 1814 the western line was about 300 metres west of Harper Road, along the western line of a grant to William McCallum and its prolongation inland. The southern boundary ran eight miles up the River from its mouth, "or until it intersects the before mentioned line [...] forming the rear of the said Parishes of Wellington and Carleton". (Note: Uses of long s in the text have been modernised for readability.) If the line continues along the Northwest Branch rather than the main body of the river then eight miles from the mouth of the Napan is roughly where the prolongation of the McCallum grant strikes the Napan.

In 1850 the parish was extended west to its modern boundary and the southern boundary was altered slightly, establishing the modern boundaries. Several pieces of territory on either side of the river were exchanged with Glenelg.

== Communities ==
Communities at least partly within the parish. bold indicates an incorporated municipality

- L ower Napan
- Upper Napan
- **Miramichi**
  - Bushville
  - Chatham
  - Chatham Head

- **Miramichi**
  - Curtis Park
  - Douglasfield
  - Loggieville
  - Lower Chatham Head
  - Morrison Cove

== Bodies of water ==
Bodies of water (Note: Not including brooks, ponds or coves.) at least partly within the parish.

- Miramichi River
- Napan River
- Chatham Lake
- Chatham Reservoir
- Napan Bay

== Islands ==
Islands at least partly within the parish.

- Middle Island

== Other notable places ==
Parks, historic sites, and other noteworthy places at least partly within the parish.

- CFB Chatham
- Miramichi Airport

== Demographics ==
Parish population total does not include portion within 2021 boundaries of Miramichi. Revised census figures based on the 2023 local governance reforms have not been released.

=== Population ===
**Population trend**

Census	Population	Change (%)
2016	511	▼2.1%
2011	522	▲4.0%
2006	502	▼3.3%
2001	519	▼6.5%
1996	555	▲6.7%
1991	520	N/A

=== Language ===
**Mother tongue (2016)**

Language	Population	Pct (%)
English only	475	93.1%
French only	25	4.9%
Both English and French	0	0%
Other languages	10	2.0%

== See also ==
- List of parishes in New Brunswick
