= Glenelg Parish, New Brunswick =

Glenelg
- Parish
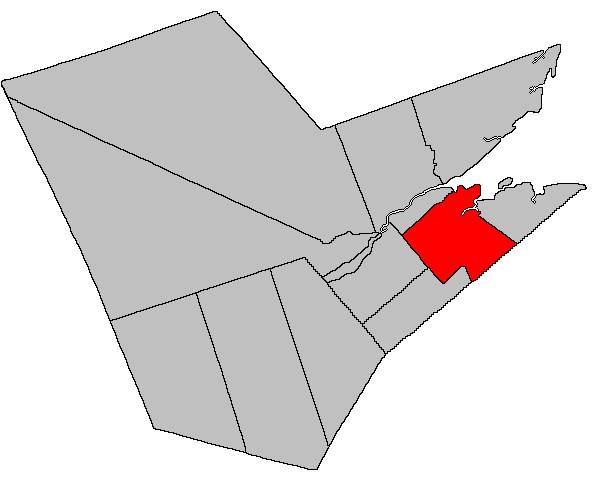
- Location within Northumberland County, New Brunswick
- Coordinates: 47.0°N 65.29°W
- Country: Canada
- Province: New Brunswick
- County: Northumberland
- Erected: 1814

Area
  - Land: 504.78 km^{2} (194.90 sq mi)

Population (2021)
  - Total: 1,532
  - Density: 3/km^{2} (7.8/sq mi)
  - Change 2016-2021: ▼1.8%
  - Dwellings: 729
- Time zone: UTC-4 (AST)
  - Summer (DST): UTC-3 (ADT)
- Figures do not include portion within the city of Miramichi

Glenelg is a geographic parish in Northumberland County, New Brunswick, Canada. (Note: The Territorial Division Act divides the province into 152 parishes, the cities of Saint John and Fredericton, and one town of Grand Falls. The Interpretation Act clarifies that parishes include any local government within their borders.)

For governance purposes it is divided between the city of Miramichi, the village of Nouvelle-Arcadie, (Note: As shown on earlier governance reform maps which have modern boundaries overlaid on pre-2023 lines; these maps can still be found in thumbnail form on the provincial government's maps page.) and the Greater Miramichi rural district. Miramichi and the rural district are members of the Greater Miramichi Regional Service Commission, while Nouvelle-Arcadie belongs to the Kent RSC.

Prior to the 2023 governance reform, the parish was divided between Miramichi and the local service districts of Black River-Hardwicke, St. Margarets, and the parish of Glenelg.

== Origin of name ==
The parish was named in honour of Charles Grant, one of the Lords Commissioners of the Treasury when the parish was erected. Grant was entitled as a Lord Commissioner to be addressed as Lord, and chose to be titled Baron Glenelg, of Glenelg in the County of Inverness when raised to the peerage in 1835.

== History ==
Glenelg was erected in 1814 from Newcastle Parish. The southwestern line was further east, along the prolongation of a line about 300 metres west of Harper Road in Miramichi. Glenelg contained almost all of Hardwicke Parish until 1852 and the Rosaireville area of Rogersville Parish until 1900.

== Boundaries ==
Glenelg Parish is bounded:

- on the north, beginning at a point about 375 metres east of Sutton Road and about 75 metres north of Carding Mill Brook, then running north 68º east (Note: By the magnet of 1850, when declination in the area was between 20º and 21º west of north. The Territorial Division Act clause referring to magnetic direction bearings was omitted in the 1952 and 1973 Revised Statutes.) to the westernmost corner of a grant to Henry Coils, about 300 metres east of the junction of Searle Road and North Napan Road and about 400 metres north of the junction of Hannah Hill Road and Weldfield Collette Road, then down the Napan River to its mouth, then through Napan Bay, Miramichi River, and Miramichi Inner Bay;
- on the east by a line beginning in Bay du Vin, then running up the Big Black River to the mouth of Little Black River, then up Little Black River to the northern point of a grant to Fred A. Fowlie, about 125 metres upstream of the Little Branch Road bridge, then running southeasterly along the northeastern line of the Fowlie grant and its prolongation to the Kent County line;
- on the south, beginning on the county line at a point about 3.1 kilometres northeasterly of Hells Gate Lake, then running northwesterly along the county line to a point about 2.6 kilometres slightly south of east of the junction of Richard-Village Road and Route 440, then northeasterly along the prolongation of the eastern line of grants in the Richard Settlement along Route 440 to the Bay du Vin River, then up Bay du Vin River to the northern line of a grant to John Townley at the mouth of Big Hovel Brook, then westerly along the Townley grant to the western parish line;
- on the west by a line beginning at the Townley grant on the prolongation of the southwestern line of a grant to William Brown Sr. in Chatham Parish, which ends at the Miramichi River in a cove northeasterly of the junction of Rasche Street and St. Patrick's Drive, then running northwesterly along the prolongation to the starting point.

=== Evolution of boundaries ===
The original western line of Glenelg was the southeasterly prolongation of the southwestern line of Chatham Parish, which ran about 300 metres west of Harper Road along the southwestern line of a grant to William McCallum, to what is now the Kent County line; the northwestern line ran up the Napan River to meet the southwestern line.

In 1850 the southwestern and northwestern lines were changed to their modern positions. This exchanged several small pieces of territory along the Napan River with Chatham and added a strip of Nelson Parish along the southwestern line, which included part of what's now the Rosairville area.

In 1852 the eastern part of Glenelg was erected as Hardwicke Parish.

In 1900 an area south of the Bay du Vin River was transferred to Rogersville Parish, taking Rosaireville and the Richard Settlement east of it.

== Communities ==
Communities at least partly within the parish. bold indicates an incorporated municipality

- Bay du Vin Mills
- Black River
- Black River Bridge
- Centre Napan
- Fowlies Mill
- Glenwood
- Little Branch
- **Miramichi**
- Napan Bay
- Point aux Carr
- Redmondville
- St. Margarets
- Upper Napan
- Victoria
- Weldfield
- Wine River

== Bodies of water ==
Bodies of water (Note: Not including brooks, ponds or coves.) at least partly in the parish.

- Bay du Vin River
- Black River
- Little Black River
- Napan River
- Hortons Creek
- Sturgeon Creek
- Taylor Creek
- Dry Lake
- Hells Gate Lake
- Macs Lake
- Rosaireville Lake
- Sands Lake
- Miramichi Inner Bay

== Other notable places ==
Parks, historic sites, and other noteworthy places at least partly in the parish.

- Black River Protected Natural Area
- CFB St. Margarets
- Goodfellow Brook Protected Natural Area
- Hells Gate Hardwoods Protected Natural Area

== Demographics ==
Parish population total does not include portion within Miramichi

=== Population ===
**Population trend**

| Census | Population | Change (%) |
|---|---|---|
| 2016 | 1,560 | ▼3.1% |
| 2011 | 1,610 | ▼2.5% |
| 2006 | 1,652 | ▼3.5% |
| 2001 | 1,712 | ▼1.3% |
| 1996 | 1,735 | ▲10.5% |
| 1991 | 1,570 | N/A |

=== Language ===
**Mother tongue (2016)**

| Language | Population | Pct (%) |
|---|---|---|
| English only | 1,440 | 92.3% |
| French only | 90 | 5.8% |
| Other languages | 20 | 1.3% |
| Both English and French | 10 | 0.6% |

== See also ==
- List of parishes in New Brunswick
