= HMCS Miramichi =

Three Canadian naval units have carried the name HMCS Miramichi.

- HMCS Miramichi (J169) (I) was a Second World War Bangor-class minesweeper that served in the Royal Canadian Navy.
- HMCS Miramichi (MCB 150) (II) was a Bay-class minesweeper, commissioned in July 1954, paid off in October 1954 and sold to France.
- HMCS Miramichi (MCB 163) (III) was also a Bay-class minesweeper, commissioned in October 1957.
