= James M. Hill Memorial High School =

Location
- 128 Henderson Street; Miramichi, New Brunswick, New Brunswick, E1N S2S; Canada
- Coordinates: 47.0227°N 65.4567°W

Information
- School type: Public, high school
- Motto: "Veritas Civitas Dignitas"
- Status: Open
- School district: Anglophone North (ASD-N)
- Superintendent: Mark Donovan
- Principal: Heidi Ryder
- Grades: 9-12
- Language: English; French immersion
- Area: Miramichi, New Brunswick
- Colours: Green; Gold
- Mascot: Tommie
- Team name: Tommies
- Website: jmh.nbed.nb.ca
- ^{‡} All statistics in this infobox (unless otherwise cited) is referenced with

James M. Hill Memorial High School is one of two public, English language high schools in the city of Miramichi, New Brunswick, Canada. It serves principally students from the south side of the Miramichi River, from the smaller communities of Chatham, Loggieville, Chatham Head, Nelson, Barnaby River, and Napan. It is named in honour of the Reverend James M. Hill.

== Notable alumni ==
- Jason Dickson, Former MLB player (Anaheim Angels)

== Sports Teams ==
- Men's and women's basketball, volleyball, hockey, rugby, track and field, cross country and soccer are offered at the school. Women's field hockey and men's football are also offered.

== See also ==
- Anglophone North School District
