= Michael Whelan (poet) =

Canadian poet (1858–1937)

Michael Whelan (also known as The Poet of Renous) was a Canadian poet. He is best known for his poetry celebrating Miramichi, including the famous Dungarvon Whooper.

Whelan was born in 1858 in Renous, New Brunswick. He worked as a school teacher, and as a book-keeper for a local mill. He is, however, best known for his poetry celebrating the Miramichi, including the famous Dungarvon Whooper. He died at Chatham, New Brunswick (now Miramichi, New Brunswick) in 1937.
