= Glenwood, New Brunswick =

Glenwood, New Brunswick may refer to:

- Glenwood, Kings County
- Glenwood, Northumberland County
- Glenwood, Restigouche County
