= Looshtauk =

Irish immigrant ship

History

Ireland
- Name: Looshtauk
- Owner: William Edmonds & Co.
- Builder: Lovett and Parker
- Laid down: Tynemouth Creek, (near St. Martins), Saint John County, New Brunswick
- Launched: 1845
- Out of service: April - June 1847 (Quarantine)
- Fate: Unknown

General characteristics
- Tons burthen: 646 (old); 636 (new)
- Propulsion: Sail
- Sail plan: Ship; sheathed in felt and yellow metal in 1846
- Complement: 24

Looshtauk was an Irish emigrant ship, captained by John M. Thain, sailing from the Port of Liverpool to the Port of Quebec on April 17, 1847. 462 passengers boarded at Liverpool. Typhus was caught by two male passengers in Liverpool and broke out during the crossing. Scarlet fever also erupted.

Of the 462 passengers, 117 had died from typhus by the time the ship reached Miramichi on June 3. 100 more were deathly ill. Only 53 survived to reach Quebec.

The passengers were well-off financially, but the ship was refused permission to land at Middle Island until the captain threatened to run his ship aground on the island. Permission was grudgingly granted. Joseph Cunard sent a boat to tow the vessel to the island at night.

Thain and the only crew member able to stand transferred the rest to the island. Since the quarantine station had been moved to Sheldrake Island, the only shelter available was several drafty fish sheds.

Thain and the rest eventually fell ill as well. He was ill for 27 days, but recovered.

Another building was eventually built on the island, taking only 4 days.

Of the surviving passengers, only 53 were willing to continue the voyage to Quebec in the vessel. The rest were put off at Chatham.

The ship later sailed for the Port of Belfast, arriving on September 27, 1847, with a new crew and master.

== Legacy ==
The musical group Connie & Paul wrote a song about the ship and its voyage, titled Bròn, Bròn Mo Bròn released on the album "The Miramichi Kitchen Party" in October 2008.
