= Point Escuminac =

Point Escuminac Lighthouse
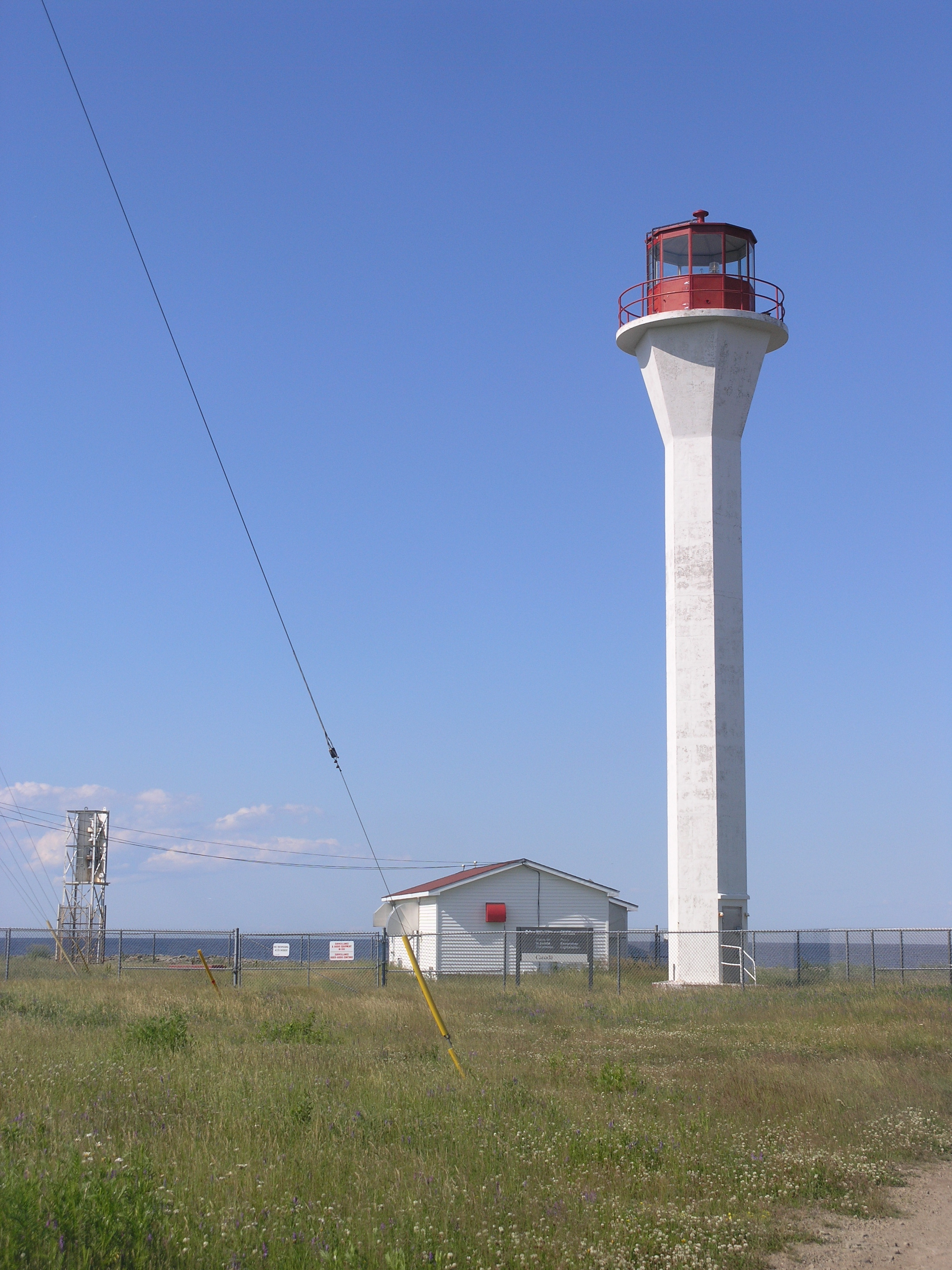
- Lighthouse at Point Escuminac, Miramichi Bay, New Brunswick
- Location: Point Escuminac; New Brunswick; Canada
- Coordinates: 47°4′22.86″N 64°47′52.51″W

Tower
- Constructed: 1841 (first)
- Foundation: concrete base
- Construction: concrete tower (current) wooden tower (first)
- Automated: 1989
- Height: 22 metres (72 ft) (current)
- Shape: hexagonal prism with flared top supporting balcony and lantern (current) octagonal prism tower (first)
- Markings: white tower, red lantern (current) white tower (first)
- Operator: Canadian Coast Guard
- Heritage: recognized federal heritage building of Canada
- Fog signal: two 3s. blast every 60s.

Light
- First lit: 1966 (current)
- Deactivated: 1966 (first)
- Focal height: 22.2 metres (73 ft) (current); 21.3 metres (70 ft) (first)
- Light source: main power
- Range: 13 nautical miles (24 km; 15 mi)
- Characteristic: Fl W 3s.

Point Escuminac is a cape located in eastern New Brunswick, Canada. Its geographic coordinates are 47º04'N, 64º48'W.

It is the dividing point for delineating the western limits of the Northumberland Strait. It is located near the unincorporated fishing community of Escuminac, at the mouth of Miramichi Bay.

== See also ==
- List of lighthouses in New Brunswick
