= Escuminac, New Brunswick =

Coordinates: 47.085083°N 64.916839°W

Location of Escuminac in New Brunswick

Escuminac (2011 population: 212) is a rural community in Northumberland County, New Brunswick, Canada. The local service district of Escuminac took its name from the community.

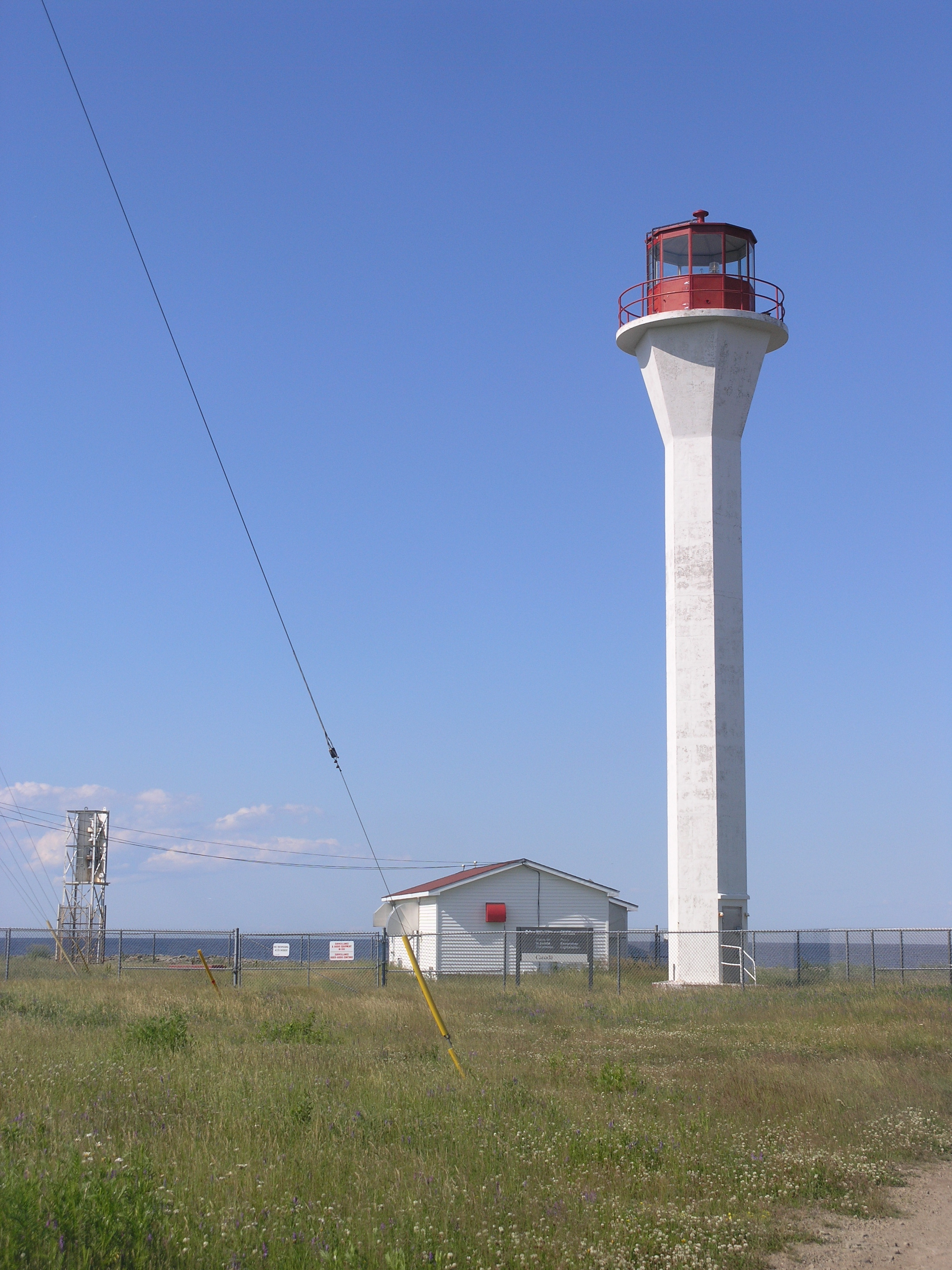
Lighthouse at Point Escuminac, Miramichi Bay, New Brunswick

Located on the south shore of Miramichi Bay, the community is several kilometres west of Point Escuminac, the southeastern limit of the bay. Canada's largest inshore fishing vessel harbour is home to the local fishing fleet. Industries include two fish processing & freezing plants and a boat building facility. One of Canada's important herring spawning grounds is located beside Point Escuminac.

According to Joseph-Étienne Guinard, a missionary and Cree language specialist with some experience with the Mi'kmaq, the word means "here are small fruits". This perfectly describes the area as berries proliferate en masse in this low-lying flat area, and the first colonist were amazed at the amount of Ericaceae.

Peat bogs and rare peat cliffs are situated in the vicinity of Point Escuminac, approximately 5 kilometers east of the village.

== History ==
Escuminac was originally an Irish and English settlement of six families, but outward emigration and the prevalence of French speakers in the immediate area has changed its composition somewhat. A small two-room English school was closed in 1979.

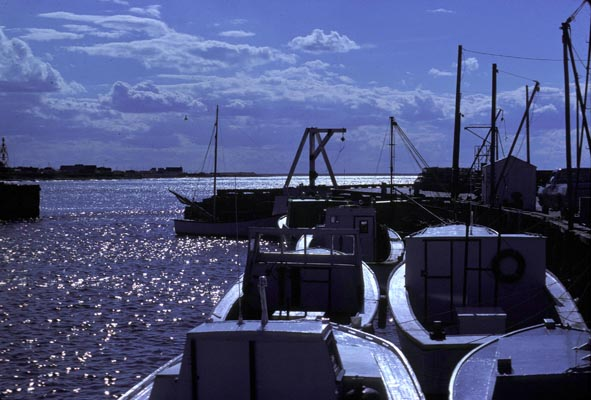
Escuminac Wharf, Miramichi Bay, New Brunswick (IR Walker 1976)

Escuminac and surrounding fishing villages, especially Baie Ste. Anne, Hardwicke and Bay du Vin were the site of a tragedy on June 19 and June 20, 1959, when a sudden storm caused a loss of 35 fishermen of the area. It is called the Escuminac Disaster. A monument by Claude Rousselle commemorating the tragedy sits at the head of the harbour.

== Demographics ==
In the 2021 Census of Population conducted by Statistics Canada, Escuminac had a population of 152 living in 76 of its 95 total private dwellings, a change of -8.4% from its 2016 population of 166. With a land area of 12.47 km^{2} (4.81 sq mi), it had a population density of 12.2/km^{2} (31.6/sq mi) in 2021.

== See also ==
- List of communities in New Brunswick
