= Canada Eastern Railway =

Railway line in New Brunswick, Canada

Overview
- Locale: New Brunswick
- Dates of operation: 1884–1904

Technical
- Track gauge: 4 ft 8 1/2 in (1,435 mm) standard gauge

The Canada Eastern Railway, originally known as the Northern and Western Railway, was a railway line operating in New Brunswick, Canada, running from Loggieville (now part of Miramichi), to Devon (opposite Fredericton). The line linked various communities along the Nashwaak and Southwest Miramichi River valleys.

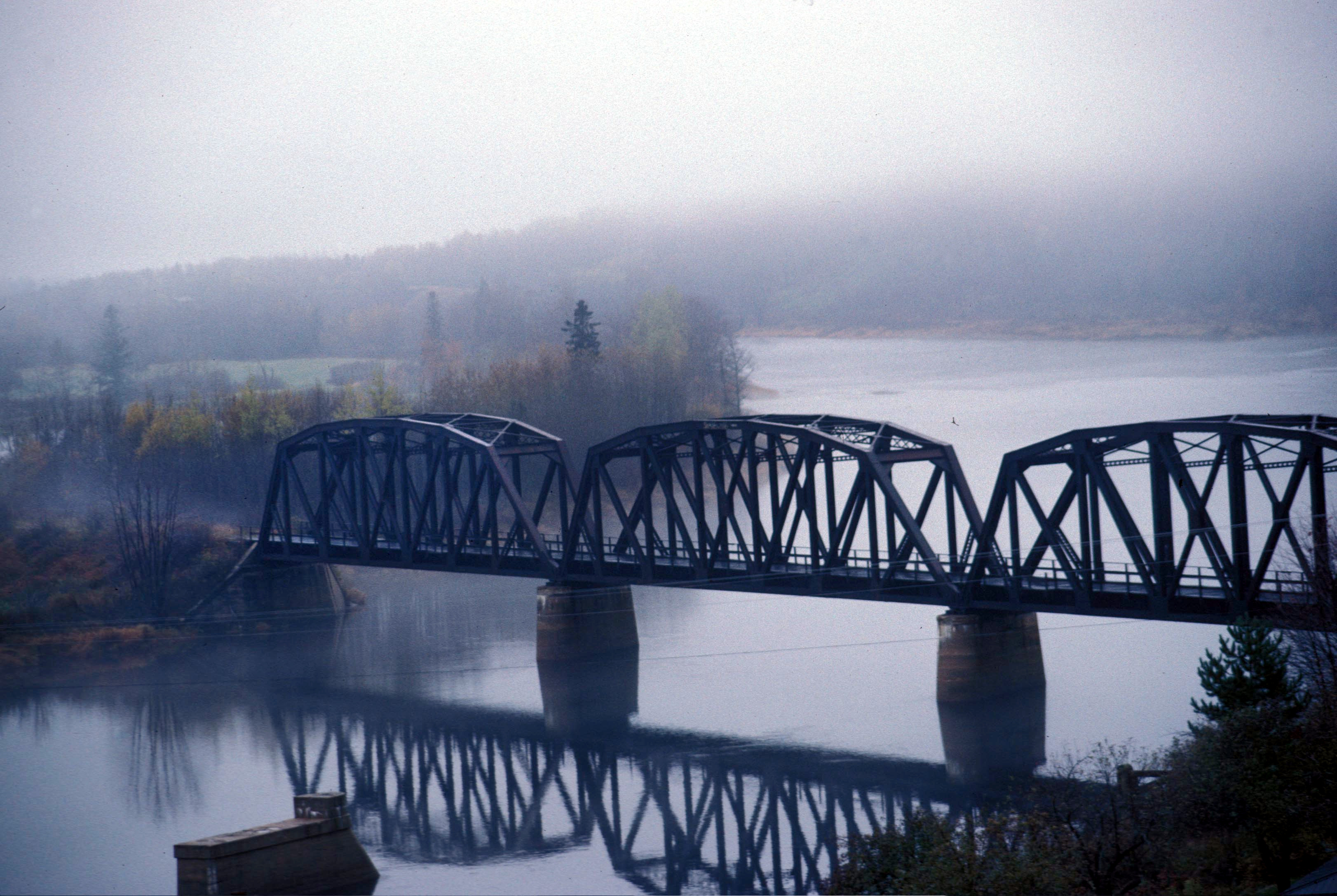
The abandoned Canada Eastern Railway bridge over the Southwest Miramichi River at Doaktown.

A joint venture of industrialists Alexander Gibson and Jabez B. Snowball, construction started in 1884 and finished in 1887. The opening of the Fredericton Railway Bridge in 1889 gave it a direct connection to the provincial capital. In 1890 the Northern and Western was reorganized and became the Canada Eastern Railway Company, of which Gibson became the sole owner in 1893.

The line was rerouted between Renous and Nelson to the north bank of the Southwest Miramichi River through to Derby Junction where it joined the Intercolonial Railway mainline at a junction between the bridges over the Southwest and Northwest Miramichi Rivers.

In 1904 the Canada Eastern was purchased by the Intercolonial Railway, a federal Crown corporation. The mainline of the National Transcontinental Railway (NTR), another government concern, was built in 1912, creating a major junction at McGivney. The Intercolonial, NTR, and others were merged into the Canadian Government Railways in 1915 and the Canadian National Railways (CNR) in 1919.

Canada Eastern and later the Intercolonial and CNR passenger trains along the line were given the nickname "Dungarvon Whooper" in reference to a local ghost story.

With declining rail usage through the latter part of the 20th century, the former Canada Eastern line became unprofitable for CNR. It was abandoned between McGivney and Derby Junction in 1985 as well as east of Chatham to Loggieville. The section south of McGivney to Fredericton was officially abandoned in 1995, although the last train over this portion of the line (CN's Nashwaak Subdivision) operated in March 1996 with a coal shipment to a heating plant at CFB Gagetown.

The only original trackage of the Canada Eastern that remains in service is operated by the Canadian National Railway between Nelson and Chatham.

== Sources ==
- Railways of New Brunswick by David Nason, New Ireland Press, 1991.
