= HMCS Miramichi (MCB 163) =

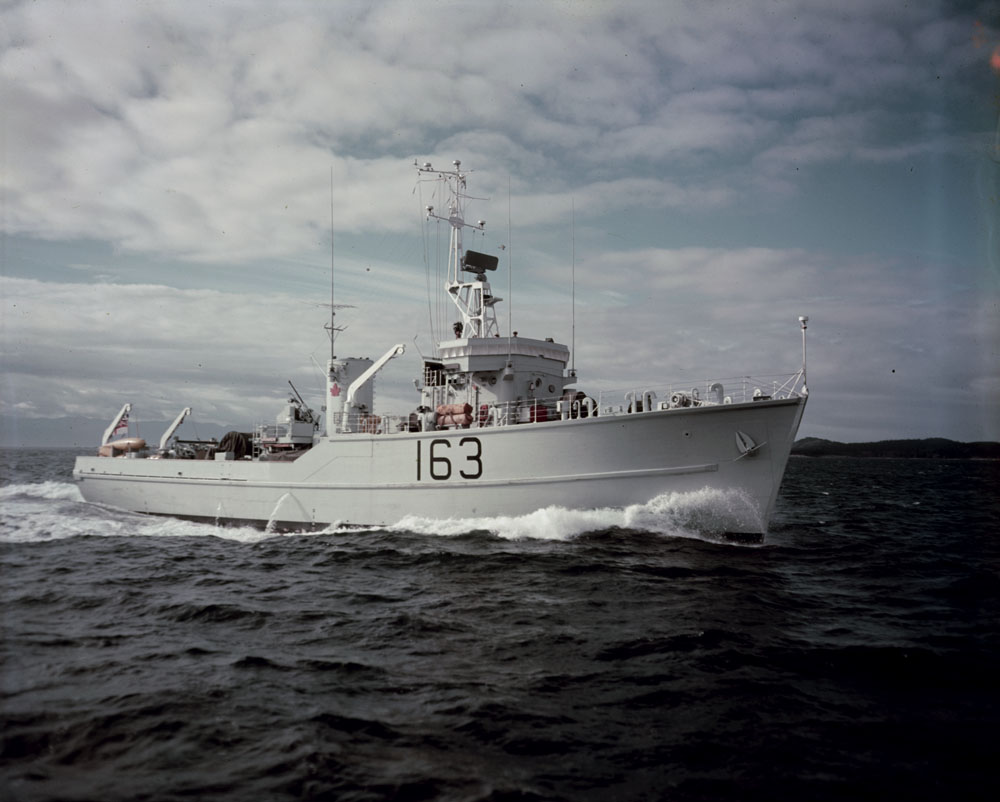
- Miramichi underway

History

Canada
- Name: Miramichi
- Namesake: Miramichi Bay
- Builder: Victoria Machinery Depot, Victoria, British Columbia
- Laid down: 2 February 1956
- Launched: 22 February 1957
- Commissioned: 29 October 1957
- Decommissioned: 16 December 1998
- Identification: MCB 163
- Motto: Loyal à la mort
- Fate: Paid off 1998, fate unknown
- Badge: On a field of birch bark proper, a pile barry wavy of ten argent and azure and overall an equilateral triangle, apex to the chief gules, charged with a porcupine or.

General characteristics
- Class & type: Bay-class minesweeper
- Displacement: 390 long tons (400 t); 412 long tons (419 t) (deep load)
- Length: 152 ft (46 m)
- Beam: 28 ft (8.5 m)
- Draught: 8 ft (2.4 m)
- Propulsion: 2 shafts, 2 GM 12-cylinder diesels, 2,400 bhp (1,800 kW)
- Speed: 16 knots (30 km/h; 18 mph)
- Range: 3,290 nmi (6,090 km; 3,790 mi) at 12 kn (22 km/h; 14 mph)
- Complement: 38
- Armament: 1 × 40 mm Bofors gun

HMCS Miramichi (hull number MCB 163) was a Bay-class minesweeper that was constructed for the Royal Canadian Navy during the Cold War. Entering service in 1957, the vessel was used as a training ship on the West Coast of Canada for the majority of her career. Miramichi was decommissioned in 1998 and the vessel's fate is unknown.

== Design and description ==
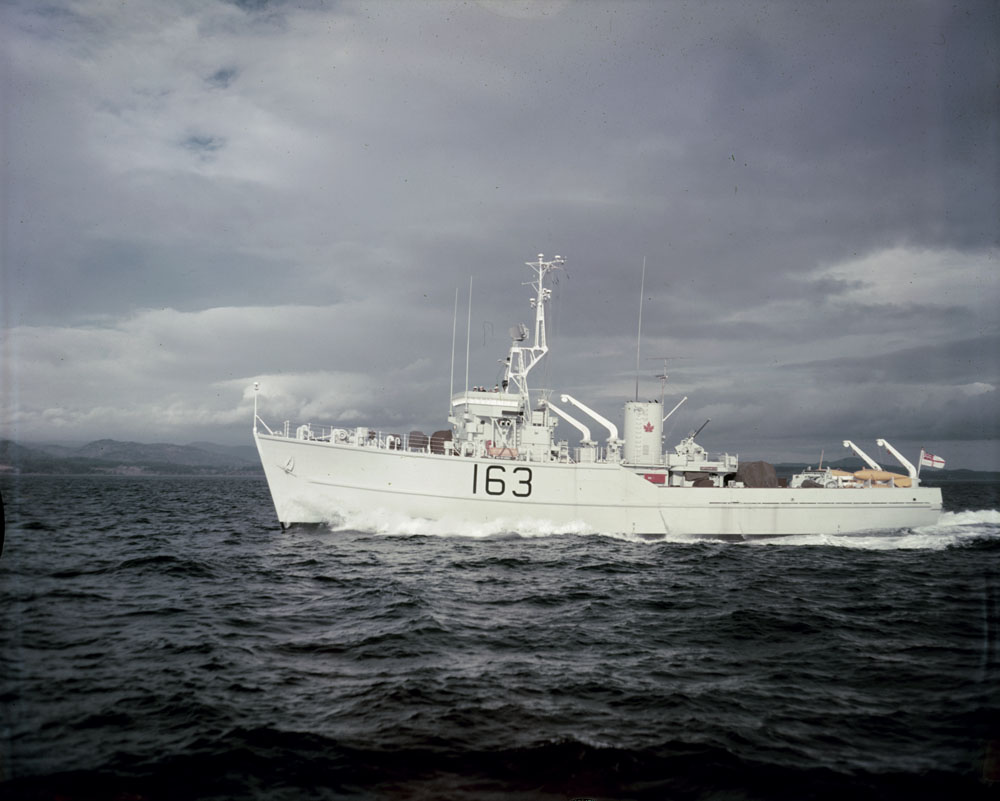
Miramichi between 1957 and 1965

The Bay class were designed and ordered as replacements for the Second World War-era minesweepers that the Royal Canadian Navy operated at the time. Similar to the Ton-class minesweeper, they were constructed of wood planking and aluminum framing.

Displacing 390 long tons (400 t) standard at 412 long tons (419 t) at deep load, the minesweepers were 152 ft (46 m) long with a beam of 28 ft (8.5 m) and a draught of 8 ft (2.4 m). They had a complement of 38 officers and ratings. (Note: Gardiner and Chumbley claim the complement was 40.)

The Bay-class minesweepers were powered by two GM 12-cylinder diesel engines driving two shafts creating 2,400 brake horsepower (1,800 kW). This gave the ships a maximum speed of 16 knots (30 km/h; 18 mph) and a range of 3,290 nautical miles (6,090 km; 3,790 mi) at 12 knots (22 km/h; 14 mph). The ships were armed with one 40 mm Bofors gun and were equipped with minesweeping gear.

== Operational history ==
Ordered as a replacement for sister ship, Miramichi (MCB 150) which had been transferred to the French Navy in 1954, the ship's keel was laid down on 2 February 1956 by Victoria Machinery Depot at their yard in Victoria, British Columbia. Named for a bay located in New Brunswick, Miramichi was launched on 22 February 1957. The ship was commissioned on 29 October 1957.

After commissioning, the minesweeper joined Training Group Pacific on the West Coast of Canada. In 1972, the class was redesignated patrol escorts. The vessel remained a part of the unit until being paid off on 16 December 1998. Colledge claims the vessel was paid off in October 1998.
