= HMCS Miramichi (MCB 150) =

History

Canada
- Name: Miramichi
- Namesake: Miramichi Bay
- Builder: Saint John Dry Dock and Shipbuilding Ltd., Saint John
- Laid down: 13 June 1952
- Launched: 4 May 1954
- Commissioned: 30 July 1954
- Decommissioned: 1 October 1954
- Identification: pennant number: MCB 150
- Motto: Loyal à la mort
- Fate: Sold to France, 1954
- Notes: Colours: Red and gold
- Badge: On a field of birch bark proper, a pile barry wavy of ten argent and azure and overall an equilateral triangle, apex to the chief gules, charged with a porcupine or.

France
- Name: La Lorientaise
- Acquired: 9 October 1954
- Commissioned: 13 November 1954
- Decommissioned: 1984 (Note: Colledge states that the ship was decommissioned 25 October 1986)
- Stricken: 1986
- Identification: P 652
- Fate: broken up Papeete, Tahiti

General characteristics
- Class & type: Bay-class minesweeper
- Displacement: 390 long tons (400 t); 412 long tons (419 t) (deep load)
- Length: 152 ft (46 m)
- Beam: 28 ft (8.5 m)
- Draught: 8 ft (2.4 m)
- Propulsion: 2 shafts, 2 GM 12-cylinder diesels, 2,400 bhp (1,800 kW)
- Speed: 16 knots (30 km/h; 18 mph)
- Complement: 38
- Armament: 1 × Bofors 40 mm gun

HMCS Miramichi (hull number MCB 150) was a Bay-class minesweeper that served in the Royal Canadian Navy and the French Navy. She was named Miramichi Bay, located at the mouth of the Miramichi River in New Brunswick. Entering service in 1954, the vessel served in the Royal Canadian Navy for only a few months before transferring to the French Navy. Renamed La Lorientaise, the ship was used as a minesweeper before converting to a patrol vessel in 1973. The ship was discarded in 1986.

== Design and description ==
The Bay class were designed and ordered as replacements for the Second World War-era minesweepers that the Royal Canadian Navy operated at the time. Similar to the Ton-class minesweeper, they were constructed of wood planking and aluminum framing.

Displacing 390 long tons (400 t) standard at 412 long tons (419 t) at deep load, the minesweepers were 152 ft (46 m) long with a beam of 28 ft (8.5 m) and a draught of 8 ft (2.4 m). They had a complement of 38 officers and ratings. (Note: Gardiner and Chumbley claim the complement was 40.)

The Bay-class minesweepers were powered by two GM 12-cylinder diesel engines driving two shafts creating 2,400 brake horsepower (1,800 kW). This gave the ships a maximum speed of 16 knots (30 km/h; 18 mph) and a range of 3,290 nautical miles (6,090 km; 3,790 mi) at 12 knots (22 km/h; 14 mph). The ships were armed with one 40 mm Bofors gun and were equipped with minesweeping gear.

== Service history ==
Miramichi was laid down on 13 June 1952 by Saint John Dry Dock and Shipbuilding Co. at Saint John, New Brunswick and was launched on 4 May 1954. The vessel was commissioned into the Royal Canadian Navy on 30 July 1954 at Saint John.

After commissioning, Miramichi spent the next two months in service before being paid off on 1 October 1954. She was transferred to France under the NATO Mutual Aid Agreement on 9 October 1954. The ship commissioned into the French Navy on 13 November 1954. The vessel was eventually replaced in the Royal Canadian Navy by Miramichi (MCB 163) of the same class. Renamed La Lorientaise the ship served as a minesweeper until 1973 when she had air conditioning installed for use as an overseas territories patrol vessel in the Pacific. She served until 1984. (Note: Colledge states that the ship was decommissioned on 25 October 1986.) The vessel was stricken in 1986 and broken up at Papeete, Tahiti.
