= Dungarvon Whooper =

Ghost story

The Dungarvon Whooper (pronounced "hooper") is a ghost story told in a song composed by Michael Whelan, about the alleged murder along the Dungarvon River in central New Brunswick, Canada, in the mid to late 19th century.

== Summary and background ==
Something close the official version is contained in Michael Whelan's 1912 poem, The story revolves around a young cook working in a New Brunswick lumber camp, along Dungarvon river. While the lumberjacks are out, the cook is left alone with the boss of the camp, who decides to murder and rob the young cook. When the victim's body is found, all his wealth he kept in his money belt is found missing. The boss explains that the cook had taken sick and died suddenly. They then bury the body in the forest some distance from the camp. However, a terrible "whooping" sound keeps the group from falling asleep that night, presumably the ghost of Ryan crying out against the crime of which he was the victim. Scared, the men flee the camp. Finally a priest arrives, and his prayers bring peace to the haunting spirit of the dead man (cf. § Whelan's song below). (Note: Cf. Whelan's 1912 poem reprinted by Wilson & Manny (1968).)

In most versions, the cook is regarded to be an Irishman, and is assigned the name of Ryan or Ryan Garvon by later tellings of the tale. (Note: It is ambiguous whether "Ryan" is meant to be his given name (as in "Ryan Garvon") or his surname (as in "Peter Ryan" in the adapted play, described below).) The murder and haunting is purported to have taken place around 1850–1875, a period of mass migration from Ireland to Canada, following the Great Famine. In many versions, the murdered Irishman has an ill-stricken mother to look after, adding to the tragedy. But this background story behind the victim is not elaborated on in Whelan's version.

The Dungarvon Whooper's physical description is usually that of an invisible ghost, but it is also sometimes said to resemble a wildcat or puma-like creature, (Note: Or an incarnation into a panther-like creature.) and the version sung by Billy Price mentions the "wagging of his tails" knocking down small trees. It has been commented that the "whooping" call heard might have actually come from a screech owl or a panther. (Note: Wilson & Manny (1968), requoted in Platts (2016), p. 320a.)

The story, which was handed down to lumberers working in New Brunswick throughout the 20th century, endures in local culture. Some versions explicitly name Rev. Edward Murdoch, a Roman Catholic priest from Renous, a performing the exorcism of the Whooper, at the professed gravesite at Whooper Spring.

Leroy Dudley, a storyteller from Maine (which borders New Brunswick) tells a version where the Dungarvon Whooper contests the Native American spirit Pamola over hegemony of the Katahdin, the tallest mountain in the state of Maine.

== Whelan's song ==
While the exact origin of the story is unknown, the best-known version comes from a song published in a local newspaper by Michael Whelan in 1912. The song is set to the tune of Where the Silvery Colorado Wends Its Way, by J. Aldrich Libbey.

Far within the forest scene,
Where the trees forever green,
Form a contrast to the beech and birches grey,
Where the snow lies white and deep,
And the song birds seem to sleep,
And cease their sweetest singing all the day.
Where the mighty monstrous moose,
Of limbs both large and loose,
Through the forest sweeps with strides both swift and strong,
Where the caribou and deer
Swim the brooks so crystal clear,
And the mighty deep Dungarvon rolls along.

Where the black bear has his den,
Far beyond the haunts of men,
And the muskrat, mink and marten swim the stream,
Where the squirrel so light and free,
Swiftly springs from tree to tree,
And the lovely snow-white rabbit sleep and dreams;
Where the sounds of toil resound
Far across the frozen ground,
And the thousand things that to the woods belong,
Where the saws and axes ring,
And the woodsmen wildly sing,
And the dark and deep Dungarvon sweeps along.

In a lumber camp one day,
While the crew were faraway,
And no one there but cook and boss alone,
A sad tragedy took place,
And death won another race,
For the young cook swiftly passed to the unknown;
From the day of long ago,
Comes this weary tale of woe,
The sad and solemn subject of my song,
When this young man drooped and died,
In his youth and manhood's pride,
Where the dark and deep Dungarvon sweeps along.

When the crew returned that night,
What a sad scene met their sight,
There lay the young cook silent, cold and dead,
Death was in his curling hair,
In his young face pale and fair,
While his knapsack formed a pillow for his head.
From the belt about his waist
All his money was misplaced,
Which made the men suspect some serious wrong,
Was it murder cold and dread,
That befell the fair young dead
Where the dark and deep Dungarvon rolls along?

When they asked the skipper why
He had made no wild outcry,
He turned away and hid his haughty head;
"Well, the youngster took so sick,
And he died so mighty quick,
I hadn't time to think," was all he said;
A tear was in each eye,
Each heart it heaved a sigh,
While through each breast the strangest feeling throng;
When each reverent head was bared,
As his funeral they prepared,
Where the mighty deep Dungarvon rolls along.

Fast fell the driven snow,
While the wild winds they did blow,
Till four feet deep upon the ground it lay,
So that on the burial day
To the graveyard far away
To bear the corpse impossible was found.
Then a forest grave was made,
And in it the cook was laid
While the song birds and the woodsmen ceased their song;
When the last farewells were said
O'er the young and lonely dead
Where the dark and deep Dungarvon sweeps along.

When the crew returned at night
Their dear comrade still they mourned,
While the shades o'night were falling o'er the hill,
All that long and fearful night
All the camp was in affright,
Such fearful whoops and yells the forest fill;
Pale and ghastly was each face,
"We shall leave this fearful place,
For this camp unto the demons does belong,
Ere the dawning of the day
We will hasten far away
From where the dark Dungarvon rolls along."

Since that day, so goes the word,
Fearful sounds have long been heard,
Far round the scene where lies the woodsman's grave,
Whoops the stoutest hearts to thrill,
Yells that warmest blood to chill,
Sends terror to the bravest of the brave;
Till beside the grave did stand,
God's good man with lifted hand,
And prayed that He those sounds should not perlong
That those fearful sounds should cease,
And the region rest in peace
Where the dark and deep Dungarvon sweeps along.

Since that day the sounds have ceased
And the region is released
From those most unearthly whoops an screams and yells,
All around the Whooper's spring
There is heard no evil thing,
And round the Whooper's grave sweet silence dwells
Be this story false or true,
I have told it unto you,
As I heard it from the folklore all life long,
So I hope all strife will cease,
And our people dwell in peace,
Where the dark and deep Dungarvon sweeps along.

== Adaptations ==
Bernard Colepaugh of Renous produced a play about the "Dungarvon Whooper". It was the first ever production of the Heritage Players, a group dedicated to performing plays based on New Brunswick's rich heritage. Mr. Colepaugh is a descendant of Michael Whalen.

The play starts off in a 1920s school house where teacher Michael Whalen (Bernard Colepaugh) summons his students to class and then excites them with the idea of studying outside under "God's Beautiful Blue Sky". After some smart remarks by Billy Phader (Thomas Saulnier), the older boy in the class, the four students convince their teacher to take a break from the British History work and tell them a ghost story. Susan (Katie McCabe) tells Mr. Whalen to tell about the Dungarvan Whooper. Michael Whalen begins by going back in time to Ireland. The scene then changes to many years before as Peter Ryan (played by student actor Tom Daley) in Ireland just as he is about to leave for the New Country to work, as his mother, family, and friends die of starvation from the Great Famine. He is given his father's money belt and some prayer beads, just before he kisses his mother goodbye. Another scene change leaves us in the camp, where Peter Ryan was hired to work as the cook. Jack Hogan (also played by Bernard Colepaugh) walks in with the crew, and they sit down for dinner. Just as they sit down at the table, a Mr. Henry Kelly knocks on the door. He is invited in, and they eat their meal.

Because Henry Kelly is "the best Fiddler in the Country," the crew convinces the boss to let them "treat today like a Saturday" and let them have a party and drink the liquor Ryan bought at the store in Blackville. Ryan has a bit too much to drink, gets carried away in his Irish dancing, and steps on McPherson's foot. Twice. A fight breaks out, and it takes the whole camp to calm Ryan and McPherson down. After a lullaby by Mr. Kelly, the men go to bed, and one of the characters, possibly McPherson, walks in covered under a jacket and puts something in Ryan's personal teapot. In most productions, this is where the intermission would begin, and in many cases, a meal be served to the guests by the cast. Turkey was the most common meal. The play then resumes when the crew are just getting out of bed. McGregor complains of symptoms of a hangover, but the boss tells them to go to work anyway. Hogan requests pies for when they get back. Peter Ryan sits down at the table to enjoy his tea, then suddenly collapses on the floor. Boss picks him up, puts him on the bed, and then the crew comes in, as there is too much snow to work. they find Pete Ryan on the floor dead, and accuse each other for his death. After much bickering and arguing, they decide that it is not right to sleep with a dead body in the camp, so they take him out to the spring and bury him. Upon their return, Whoops and Howls leave and unsettling atmosphere. The Lord's Prayer is recited, and they get to sleep. The grave is later blessed by a priest, and all remains calm deep in the Dungarvon Woods.

The first issue of the Dark Horse comic series, "Blue Book: 1947", includes a back-up segment called "True Weird", which features an adaptation of the Dungarvon Whooper.

There is a chainsaw carving of Ryan at the Municipal Park in Miramichi River Valley, New Brunswick, Canada

== Debunked ==
In 1895, a high-profile American reporter named Fredrick Irland published an article about a time he had gone on a fishing trip with reporter Frank Risteen on the Miramichi.

They went on this trip with three guides; Henry Braithwaite, his assistant Dave Douglass, and an unnamed Mi’kmaq assistant guide from Quebec. As a group, they followed a trail to an old abandoned logging camp, where lumberjacks used to stop. They stayed there for a few nights, but on one of them Frank Risteen woke to a high-pitched scream in the dark. As he tried to fall back asleep, he noticed a dark silhouette in the open doorway of their logging cabin. Upon this sight, Risteen lit up a candle to reveal a haggard old man in torn clothes with long, matted hair. He was carrying a large rusty axe.

Risteen simply watched the man come over to their campfire and hold his hands over it to warm himself up. When Fredrick Irland woke up, he was surprised to see the old man who had slept all night by the fire. When Irland and Risteen questioned the man, they found he didn’t speak very clearly, but learned that he had been in the American Civil War and that he was headed to Grand Falls. They asked the man for his name, and while it was partially unintelligible they thought it could be something like ‘Dorns’ or ‘Torrance.’

When the men made themselves breakfast, they took a photo of the man. After having breakfast with the man, he simply turned and left after muttering something similar to ‘Is there any man here who knows me; or do I know any man here?’ The last sighting of this man—believed to be the Dungarvon Whooper, was in the next year.

== Eponymy ==
=== Passenger Train ===
The nickname "Dungarvon Whooper" was later given to a numbered passenger train operated by the Canada Eastern Railway running from Newcastle to Fredericton, along the Southwest Miramichi River. The train operated until it was retired on 24 April, 1936. It has been said that the sound of the steam locomotive whistle reminded local residents of the legend. This train operated on a line originally built by New Brunswick businessmen, Alexander Gibson and Jabez Bunting Snowball.

== See also ==
- Dungavenhooter
- Underwater panther
