= Loggieville, New Brunswick =

Coordinates: 47°04′N 65°23′W

Communities amalgamated in 1995 to form the City of Miramichi, New Brunswick

Loggieville is a Canadian suburban neighbourhood in the city of Miramichi, New Brunswick. The community is located at the mouth of the Miramichi River on the southern bank where the river estuary discharges into the bay. Named after the Loggie family who were prominent local merchants, Loggieville was an incorporated village in Northumberland County until municipal amalgamation in 1995.

== History ==
Federal census population history of Loggieville
Year	Pop.	±%
1971	877	—
1976	784	−10.6%
1981	781	−0.4%
1981A	810	+3.7%
1986	764	−5.7%
1991	762	−0.3%
Source: Statistics Canada

Originally named Black Brook, the first store opened at Loggieville sometime between 1809 and 1813. It was settled by principally by Scottish and English immigrants, although the community also has some Acadian and Irish inhabitants. The community developed into an important shipping port in the mid-1880s after the Canada Eastern Railway built its eastern terminus on the shores of Miramichi Bay.

Fishing and fish packing were prominent industries for many years.

== See also ==
- List of neighbourhoods in Miramichi, New Brunswick
