= New Brunswick School District 16 =

School district in New Brunswick, Canada

School District 16 is a Canadian school district in New Brunswick.

District 16 is an Anglophone district operating 21 public schools (gr. K-12) in Northumberland and Kent Counties.

Current enrollment is approximately 6,500s students and 440 teachers. District 16 is headquartered in Miramichi.

== List of schools ==
=== High schools ===
- Bonar Law Memorial School
- Miramichi Valley High School
- North & South Esk Regional High School
- James M. Hill Memorial High School

=== Middle schools ===
- Dr. Losier Middle School
- Eleanor W. Graham Middle School

=== Elementary schools ===
- Harcourt School
- Ian Baillie Primary School
- Napan Elementary School
- North & South Esk Elementary School
- Rexton Elementary School

=== Combined elementary and middle schools ===
- Gretna Green School
- Max Aitken Academy
- Millerton Elementary & Junior High School
- Miramichi Rural School
- Nelson Rural School
- Tabusintac Rural School
- King Street Elementary School

=== Other schools ===
- Big Cove Site
- Blackville School
- New Brunswick Youth Centre
- Rexton & Area Learning Centre
- The Learning Center-Miramichi
- Eel Ground School
