= Money belt =

Belt with a concealed compartment

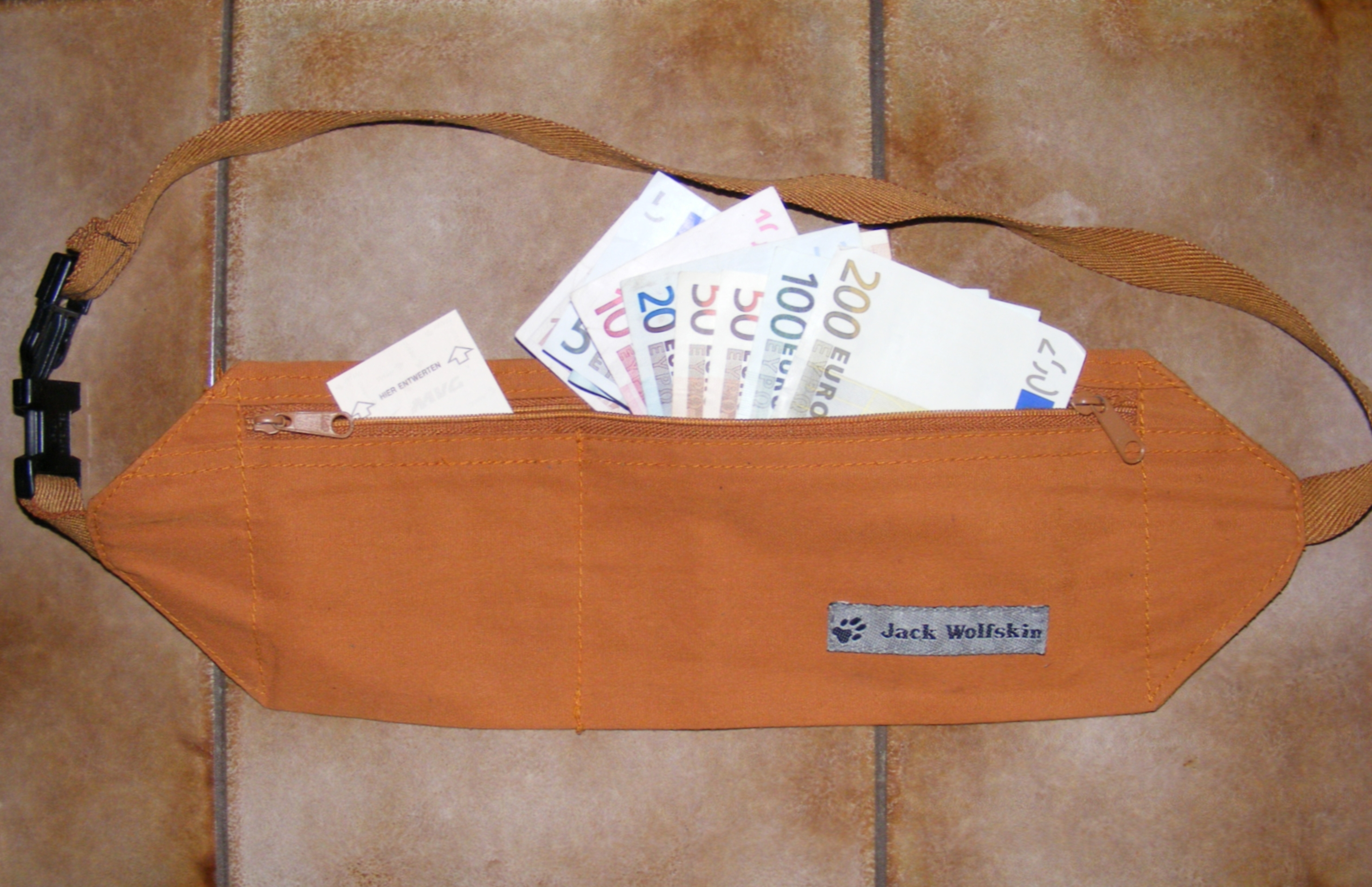
Jack Wolfskin money belt with zipper

Money belts are belts with secret compartments, often worn by tourists. One form of money belt is a belt with a pouch attached to the front which is worn under a shirt to protect valuables from thieves and pickpockets.

Another form appears to be an ordinary belt when worn, but contains one or more hidden pockets on the inside, typically closed with a zipper.

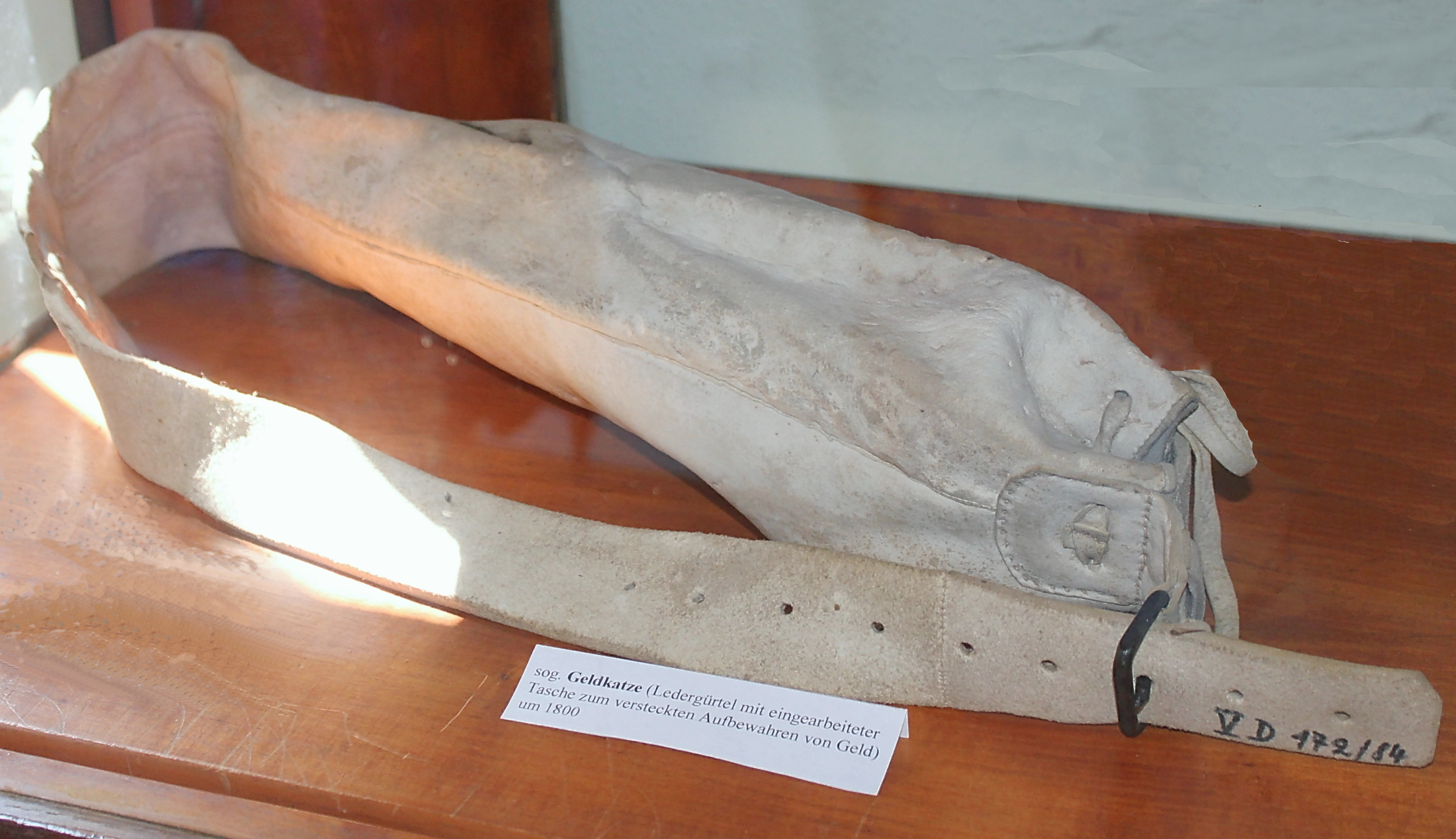
Historical money belt from 1800

Items typically placed in a money belt generally include such things as a passport, travel tickets, driver's license, credit cards, cash, and jewellery. A significant problem is that scammers, pickpockets, beggars, and the like, know that the presence of a money belt brings a high likelihood of the bearer being a tourist, and therefore a high-value target, bringing more attention upon the wearer than desirable.

== See also ==
- Money bag
- Wallet
