= Miramichi Airport =

Airport in New Brunswick, Canada

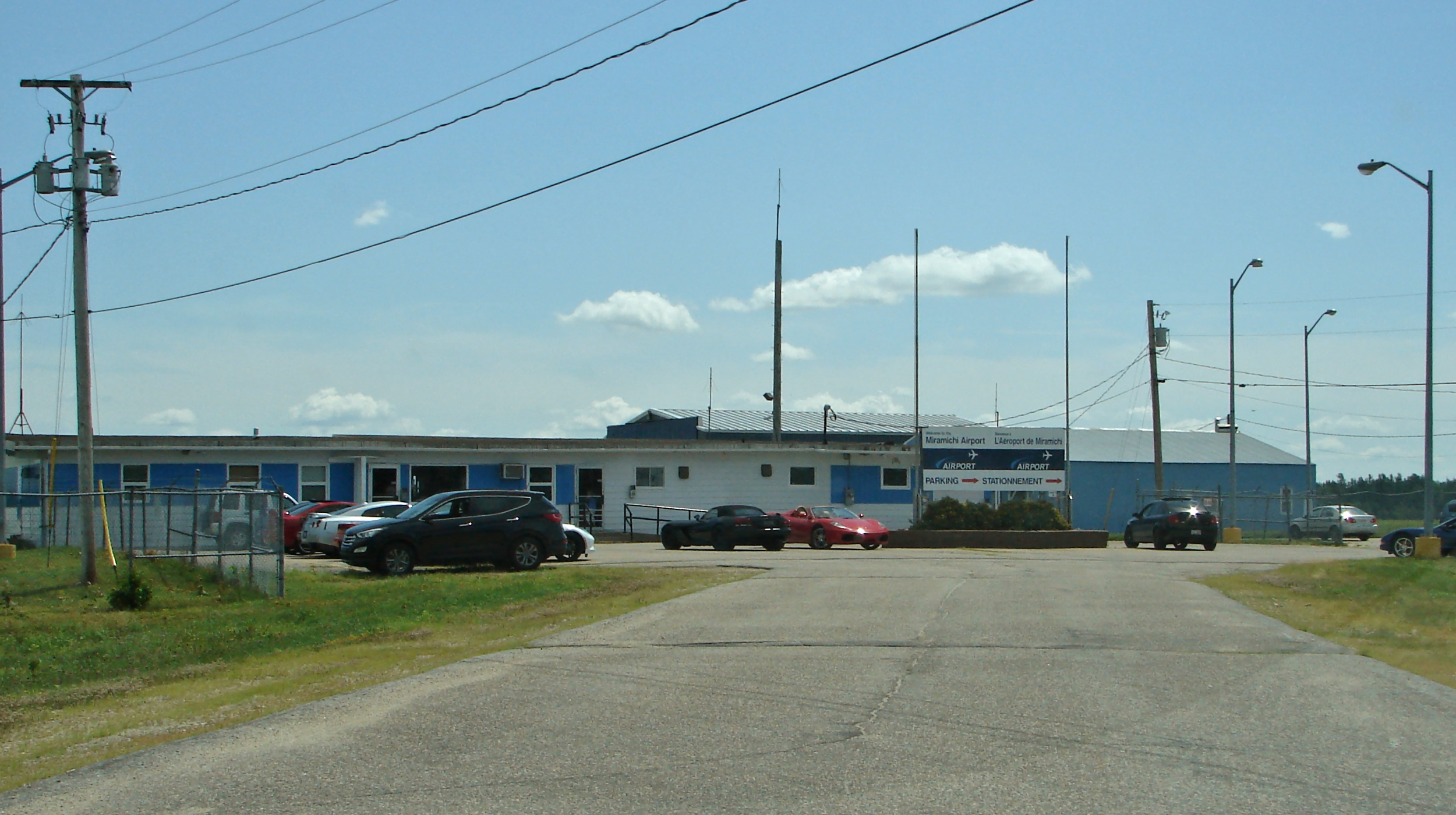
- IATA: YCH; ICAO: CYCH

Summary
- Airport type: Public
- Operator: Miramichi Airport Commission
- Location: Miramichi, New Brunswick
- Time zone: AST (UTC−04:00)
  - Summer (DST): ADT (UTC−03:00)
- Elevation AMSL: 110 ft / 34 m
- Coordinates: 47°00′21″N 065°27′25″W
- Website: miramichiairport.com

Map
- Location in New Brunswick

Runways
Direction	Length		Surface
Direction	ft	m	Surface
09/27	10,006	3,050	Asphalt

Statistics (2010)
- Aircraft movements: 6,255
- Source: Canada Flight Supplement; Movements from Statistics Canada

Miramichi Airport (IATA: YCH, ICAO: CYCH) is located 1.6 nautical miles (3.0 km; 1.8 mi) south of Miramichi, New Brunswick, Canada.

The runway was originally 10,006 ft × 150 ft (3,050 m × 46 m) but was shortened to 5,899 ft × 150 ft (1,798 m × 46 m); in 2012 it was re-extended to 10,006 ft × 150 ft (3,050 m × 46 m) and is maintained year-round. It has a pavement overlay (from 1998), new approach lights and a new taxiway. The airport is the home base of the Department of Natural Resources and Energy Air Tanker Operations, and Forest Protection Limited, who own and operate the air tanker fleet. In addition, a General Electric J85 engine test facility is located at the airport.

The airport is the former site of CFB Chatham, a military air base, which closed in 1996, after military units were moved to other bases. There is one abandoned runway within the airport which is still used for local glider operations. The two southern runways (04/22 and 15/33) were truncated by the southern boundary fence parallel to the main runway and one (15/33) was used as a drag strip and the other (04/22) is an industrial area but the current status is unknown. The top of 04/22 is now taxiway 'B' which was where the ready hangars for the McDonnell CF-101 Voodoos were, leading to the threshold of runway 27.

== Runways ==
Since the closure of the airbase, the airport only has one runway operational for aircraft and one closed runway for glider use only.

- 09/27 - 10,006 ft × 150 ft (3,050 m × 46 m) - asphalt lighted - operational

=== Closed ===
The three former runways were paved and marked to indicate their closure or non-use.

- 04/22 – 5,200 ft (1,585 m) - truncated at airport fence - closed
- 10/28 – 7,500 ft (2,286 m) - glider only
- 15/33 – 5,513 ft (1,680 m) - truncated at airport fence - converted to drag strip
