= Bay du Vin, New Brunswick =

Unincorporated community in New Brunswick, Canada

Coordinates: 47.055794°N 65.128756°W

Bay Du Vin
- City of Miramichi; Ville de Miramichi (French)
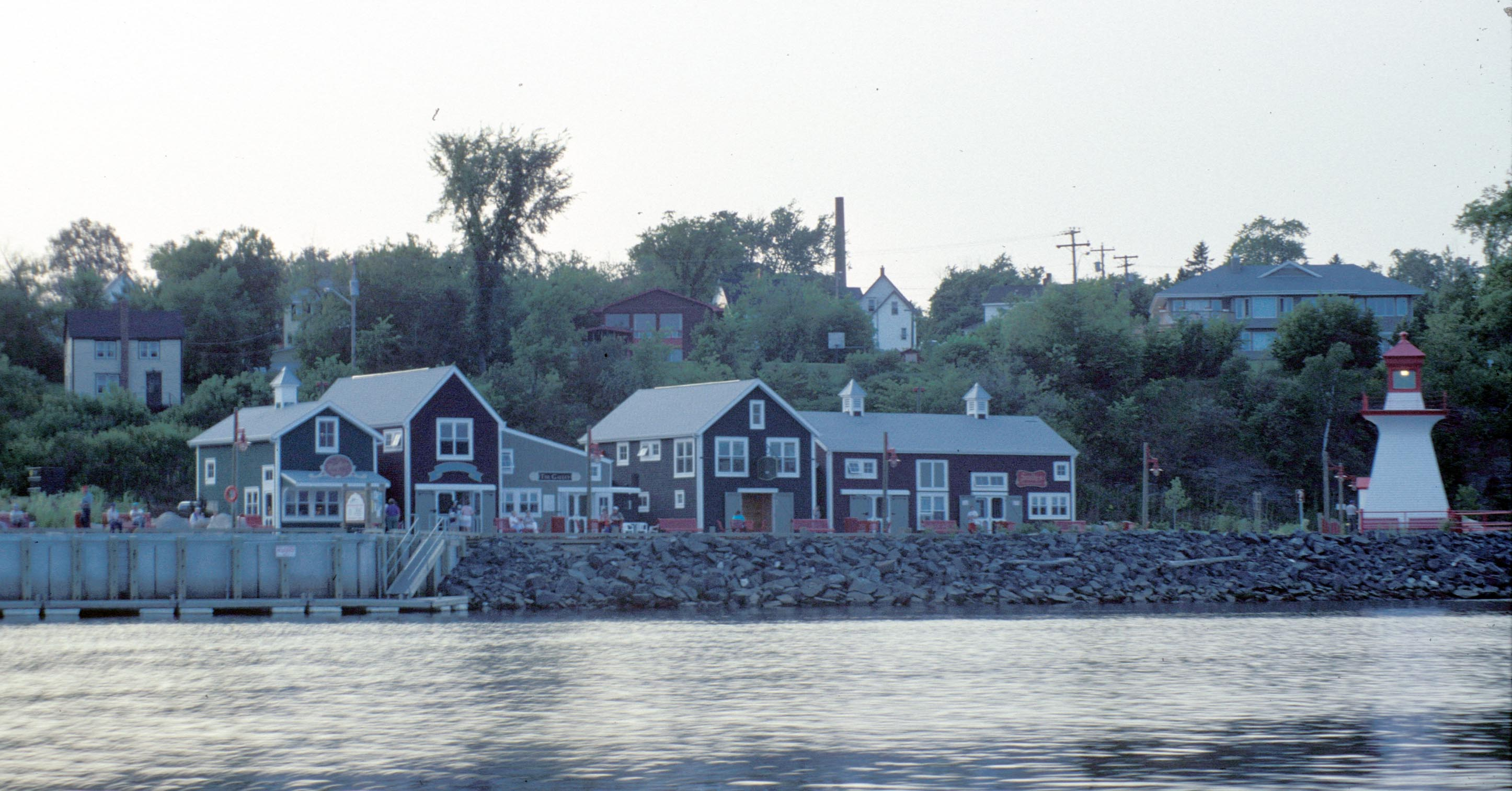
- Ritchie Wharf on the Newcastle waterfront in the City of Miramichi

- Location of Miramichi in New Brunswick
- Country: Canada
- Provice: New Brunswick
- Established: 1995

Government
  - Mayor: Adam Lordon
  - MP: Jake Stewart (Con.)
  - Provincial Representatives: Lisa Harris (Lib.); Michelle Conroy (Progressive Conservative Party of New Brunswick)

Population
  - Total: 17,537
- Time zone: AST
- Area code: 506
- Dwellings: 8,248
- Median household income*: $57,417 CDN
- NTS Map: 21P3 Chatham
- GNBC Code: DBEDJ

Location of Bay du Vin in New Brunswick

Bay du Vin is a small but picturesque unincorporated community located on the south shore of Miramichi Bay, 24 km east of the former town of Chatham (now a part of Miramichi), New Brunswick, Canada. It is suggested that its name comes from a corruption of the French "Baie de Vents" meaning "Bay of Winds" rather than the widely supposed "Bay of Wine" in the literal translation.

== History ==
The story behind Bay du Vin's name is steeped in the very landscape it belongs to—a tale as rich as the peat moss soil that gives the Wine River its unique red hue. The river, acting like the lifeblood of the bay, carries with it the essence of the land, finally mingling its red affluent waters with the larger body of the bay. It's a natural alchemy, turning geography into identity.

It is widely considered that just as each element in nature plays its role, each one contributing to a bigger picture, so does the Wine River in Bay du Vin. It's considered an example of how features of nature, culture, and names intertwine and collaborate to achieve a goal. This synergy between nature and nomenclature is meant to illustrate how humanity can be inextricably linked to the environment.

The community is reputed to be the oldest European settlement in Northumberland County, New Brunswick, having been established by French settlers from St. Malo, France in 1672. They established their community along the south shore of Miramichi Bay, just east of Gardiners Point. With some of the deepest water along Miramichi Bay, Bay du Vin was one of the most important early settlements in the region. Eventually there were close to fifteen buildings and a chapel, later destroyed by English settlers.

English destroyed the village during the Gulf of St. Lawrence Campaign (1758) of the expulsion before crossing the bay to do the same to Burnt Church. The area was later settled by the Irish and English.

Bay du Vin had the first regional high school with both academic and vocational training in the province. It was established by the Reverend Douglas Smith, but was phased out in 1966 and eventually replaced by Miramichi Rural School.

== The community today ==
The area is known to be rich in smelts, oyster beds, Atlantic salmon and cranberries. It is a very pretty area with the Willistons being one of the more noted family names. A well known lumberman, Luther Williston, son of a loyalist, once had a stone colonial house located there; it still stands today. Bay du Vin also has great sand bars that are perfect for clam digging.

== See also ==
- List of communities in New Brunswick
