= Glenwood, Northumberland County =

Glenwood
- Unincorporated community
- Location of Glenwood, New Brunswick
- Coordinates: 46.85°N 65.47°W
- Country: Canada
- Province: New Brunswick
- County: Northumberland
- Parish: Glenelg
- Electoral Districts Federal: Madawaska—Restigouche

Government
  - Type: Local service district
- Time zone: UTC-4 (AST)
  - Summer (DST): UTC-3 (ADT)
- Postal code(s): E1N: 5H8-5H9; 5J1-5J7; E8B: 1Z1-1Z2
- Area code: 506
- Access Routes: Route 11 Route 134

Glenwood is an unincorporated community in Northumberland County, New Brunswick, Canada.

== See also ==
- List of communities in New Brunswick
