= Napan, New Brunswick =

Community in New Brunswick, Canada

Coordinates: 46.889058°N 65.512075°W

Napan is a community in the Canadian province of New Brunswick, approximately 140 kilometres (87 mi) north of Moncton. It is near Chatham, a neighbourhood of Miramichi, accessible from Highway 11.

Running through the community is the Napan River, and four bridges cross the river at various points: at Hannah Lane, Highway 11, Johnston Lane, and Highway 117. There was also once a crossing at White Lane. At one time, these bridges were covered, although all have been upgraded to steel and concrete structures.

Once a thriving farming community, the Napan landscape is now dominated by residential dwellings. A handful of small farming operations dot the landscape, but much of the farmland has either been divided into building lots or returned to a forested state.

Despite its relatively small size, Napan is home to Carmel United Church, Napan Elementary School (K–5), and the Napan Community Centre (which has hosted the Napan Agricultural Show since 1992 and is the site of many community gatherings). Organizations active in the community include the Women's Institute (the second to be founded in New Brunswick in 1911), the Napan 4-H Club (once the largest in Eastern New Brunswick), the United Church Women and the Farm Women. It is also served by a variety of small businesses, including: L.J. Patterson Sales and Services, Andrew's Fish and Chips, CARSTAR Miramichi, and City Limits Convenience Shell Gas Bar.

== History ==
In its earlier history, Napan was also the home of several sawmills and grist mills, as well as a creamery.

Napan was originally settled largely by Scottish immigrants, many of whom had roots in Dumfriesshire. The community was once known by its constituent parts, which at one time included Upper Napan, Centre Napan, Lower Napan, and Napan Bay. These various communities, although still known locally by these separate names, are more generally known as Napan.

Until the 1960s, the community was served by several one-room school houses, which local children attended until grade 8. These schools were replaced by the present Napan Elementary School. The majority of middle and high school-aged children in the community now attend Dr. Losier Middle School and James M. Hill Memorial High School.

== See also ==
- List of communities in New Brunswick
