= Miramichi, New Brunswick =

City in New Brunswick, Canada

Miramichi
- City
- Chatham Newcastle

- Flag
- Motto: Canada's Irish Capital
- Location of Miramichi in New Brunswick
- Coordinates: 47.0225°N 65.508889°W
- Country: Canada
- Province: New Brunswick
- County: Northumberland
- Established: 1995

Government
  - Mayor: Veronique Arsenault
  - Governing Body: Miramichi City Council
  - MP: Mike Dawson (Con.)
  - MLAs: Sam Johnston (Lib); Michelle Conroy (PC)

Area
  - Total: 183.03 km^{2} (70.67 sq mi)
  - Land: 178.98 km^{2} (69.10 sq mi)
- Highest elevation: 31 m (102 ft)
- Lowest elevation: 0 m (0 ft)

Population (2021)
  - Total: 17,692
  - Density: 98.8/km^{2} (256/sq mi)
  - Change (2016–21): ▲0.9%
- Time zone: UTC−4 (AST)
  - Summer (DST): UTC−3 (ADT)
- Postal code(s): E1N, E1V
- Area code: 506
- Dwellings: 8,248
- Median household income*: $57,417 CDN
- NTS Map: 21P3 Chatham
- GNBC Code: DBEDJ
- Website: miramichi.org

Miramichi (/ˌmɛrəməˈʃiː/ /ˌmɪrəmɪˈʃiː/) is the largest city in northern New Brunswick, Canada. It is situated at the mouth of the Miramichi River where it enters Miramichi Bay. The Miramichi Valley is the second longest valley in New Brunswick, after the Saint John River Valley. Miramichi is the Irish Capital of Canada.

On 1 January 2023, Miramichi annexed parts of two local service districts on its northern border; revised census information has not been released.

== Neighbourhoods ==
The city of Miramichi was formed in 1995 through the forced amalgamation of two towns, Newcastle and Chatham, and several smaller communities, including Douglastown, Loggieville, and Nelson. Also the local service districts of Nordin, Moorefield, Chatham Head, and Douglasfield. The amalgamation also included portions of the former local service district of Ferry Road-Russellville (the remnant later renamed Lower Newcastle-Russellville), Chatham Parish, Glenelg Parish and Nelson Parish.

== History ==
=== Mi'kmaq and French communities (before 1765) ===
Long prior to European settlement, the Miramichi region was home to members of the Mi'kmaq first nation. For the Mi'kmaq, Beaubears Island, at the junction of the Northwest and Main Southwest branches of the Miramichi River was a natural meeting point.

Following the European discovery of the Americas, the Miramichi became part of the French colony of Acadia. About 1648, Nicolas Denys, Sieur de Fronsac, established a fort and trading post, Fort Fronsac, on the Miramichi. This establishment was apparently constructed "on the North side of the Miramichi, at the forks of the river". According to W.F.Ganong, a Recollet Mission was established in 1686 on the Miramichi "in Nelson", "probably near Beaubear's Island".

Nicolas Denys' son, Richard Denys, was placed in charge of the fort and trading post, and in 1688 Richard states, "Miramichi is the principal place of my residence", and describes his establishment as including about a dozen French and more than 500 indigenous inhabitants. In 1691 Richard died at sea; the post declined.

The following account from the Dictionary of Miramichi Biography describes in greater detail the extent of the Denys' Miramichi base:

"The domain of Nicholas Denys, governor of Acadia, extended along the southerly side of the Gulf of St Lawrence, from Miscou Island to Cape Breton. It may have included a trading post at Miramichi in the 1640s, but the first extensive French establishment on the river was that of Denys's son Richard Denys. He began to cultivate land along the Miramichi in 1684. In 1688 he had a fort with gun emplacements, a house built of freestone, and a storehouse. There were three French families at the fort, and he had men employed catching fish. Nearby there were approximately eighty Micmac wigwams.

"The site of Denys's establishment, which is considered to have been on the north side of the Miramichi opposite the Point - that is, near the former pulp mill site in Newcastle - was abandoned by 1691. In August of that year, when he was thirty-seven years old, Denys set sail for Quebec in the ship Saint-François-Xavier, which was never heard of again. His estate passed to his widow in 1694 and was still owned by members of the family in Quebec in the 1750s."

By about 1740 French villages were well established on Miramichi Bay at Bay du Vin and Neguac. In the current city of Miramichi, a larger village existed at Canadian Point, and a town comprising 200 houses, a chapel, and provision stores occupied "Beaubear's Point". The French maintained batteries of guns at the east end of Beaubears Island and at French Fort Cove.

==== French and Indian War ====
The French and Indian War erupted in 1754. During the war many Acadian homes were destroyed by the British, and their residents were deported (see the Expulsion of the Acadians).

In 1757, the French general, Charles Deschamps de Boishébert et de Raffetot attempted to evade British troops in the Saint John River Valley and the Bay of Fundy, by leading 900 French refugees up the northeast coast of New Brunswick to Miramichi, establishing a camp, "Camp de l'Espérance", on Beaubears Island. After the Siege of Louisbourg (1758), Boishebert led a group of Acadians from St. Peter's, Nova Scotia to Miramichi. Over 200 of the refugees died at the camp.

On 13 August 1758 French officer Boishebert left Miramichi with 400 soldiers, including Acadians from Port Toulouse, for Fort St George (Thomaston, Maine). His detachment reached there on 9 September but was caught in an ambush and had to withdraw. They then went on to raid Friendship, Maine, where British settlers were killed and others taken prisoner. This was Boishébert's last Acadian expedition. From there, Boishebert and the Acadians went to Quebec and fought in the Battle of Quebec (1759).

In September 1758 Colonel James Murray reported spending two days in Miramichi Bay during the Gulf of St. Lawrence Campaign looking unsuccessfully for Acadians, but destroying anything he found. This included burning the first stone church built in New Brunswick (at the site of the present-day community of Burnt Church). Murray did not sail as far west as Beaubear's Island.

Most of the surviving Beaubear's Island refugees soon left the Miramichi, seeking refuge in Quebec. Some Acadians, however, remained and escaped British attempts at deportation. They eventually established (or re-established) a host of small Acadian communities along the northern and eastern coasts of present-day New Brunswick.

=== Scottish and Loyalist immigration (1765–1800) ===
The French were defeated at Quebec (1759) and Montreal (1760), and the remaining Miramichi settlement was subsequently burned to the ground by British Commodore John Byron (Foul-Weather Jack) in 1760. The French North American colonies (apart from Saint Pierre and Miquelon) were ceded to the British in the 1763 Treaty of Paris. The Miramichi thus became a part of the British colony of Nova Scotia, and later New Brunswick. Benjamin Marston, a surveyor and the first sheriff, reported in 1785 that "a considerable French Village" had existed on Wilson's Point (adjacent to Beaubear's Island, the present-day site of the Enclosure).

Although they were preceded by the Acadians, credit for the first permanent white settlement at Miramichi is often granted to Scottish settlers, led by William Davidson. William Davidson (a.k.a. John Godsman) and John Cort had obtained a large grant encompassing much of the Miramichi region in 1765, and promoted the area in both Scotland and New England as a new home to potential settlers.

==== American Revolution and Battle at Miramichi (1779) ====
At the beginning of the American Revolution the Mi'kmaq and Maliseet were supportive of the Americans against the British. They participated in the Maugerville Rebellion and the Battle of Fort Cumberland in 1776. Three years later, in June 1779, Mi'kmaq in the Miramichi attacked and plundered some of the British in the area. The following month, British Captain Augustus Harvey, in command of HMS Viper, arrived in the area and battled with the Mi'kmaq. One Mi'kmaq was killed and 16 were taken prisoner to Quebec. The prisoners were eventually brought to Halifax, where they were later released upon signing an oath of allegiance to the British Crown on 28 July 1779.

After the battle, Davidson temporarily found refuge along the Saint John River. A subsequent treaty signed 22 September 1779 ensured a more peaceful coexistence. Following the American Revolution some loyalist families moved to Miramichi. Davidson's original grant was revoked, and competition for the best lands escalated tensions between the early Scottish and new loyalist settlers.

=== Great Miramichi Fire of 1825 ===
In 1825, a large forest fire, among the worst in recorded history of North America, devastated a number of communities in northern New Brunswick.

=== Irish immigration (1815–1850) ===
The Irish began arriving in Miramichi in numbers after 1815 at the end of the Napoleonic Wars and with a few exceptions ceased coming to the area before the Great Irish Famine of 1847. They came to the area voluntarily to better their lives. Contrary to prevailing belief, not all of them were Catholic though very few Protestants among them identified openly as Irish and most of their descendants in Miramichi do not do so even to this day. Most arrived from the ports of Belfast and Cork each of which had strong commercial ties with Miramichi. Like the Scots, they came on timber ships as individuals or, in small family groups. The average age upon arrival was twenty-four. There was some chain emigration whereby additional family members joined the emigrant later but this was minimal. The Miramichi River valley was not settled by large transplantations of Scottish clans or large scale movements of starving and evicted Irish. Though there are one or two interesting exceptions. In 1815 after trade had developed with Newfoundland, Miramichi was surprised and shaken by the arrival of the so-called "Two Boaters", perhaps as many as 2000. These were the Irish who had taken advantage of cheap fares to St. John's in the spring and summer of 1815. They were mostly poor laborers and farmers and it seems that initially they settled mainly in the Chatham/Douglastown area. With no prospect of obtaining a land grant, jobs in the woods or in the mills were the only means of getting established. Most of them were able to get at least temporary employment upon arrival, but it was short lived. In 1819, a sharp decline in timber prices resulted in massive layoffs in Miramichi including most of the "Two Boat" Irish of the Chatham area. Following their grueling experience in St. John's and now unemployed, they became disenchanted by their newfound misery so many miles from home. They began to create disturbances in the village of Chatham. Violent outrages were committed in broad daylight, property was stolen and in the worst cases houses and barns were burned to the ground. The people of the area soon dubbed them "those uncivilized immigrants from Ireland", whom local magistrates were powerless to control. But the Irish were not the only troublemakers along the river at that time. They were often mistakenly blamed for outrageous disturbances caused by unruly sailors idling about the port during the spring and summer months. These idle sailors whooped it up at Miramichi particularly on Sundays when the taverns were closed but often the Irish got the blame. In 1822, a detachment of the 78th regiment stationed in Fredericton was temporarily sent to Chatham to keep the peace. But it was not the soldiers of 78th regiment who quieted the Irish. It took an improved economy, jobs and newfound opportunity to do the trick.

Immigration from Ireland influences the Miramichi region's accent. It differs from other Atlantic Canadian English dialects and with terminology.

=== The Looshtauk Tragedy (1847) ===
Unlike the ports of Quebec, Saint John, St Andrews, Boston, Baltimore, Philadelphia, New York, Charleston and New Orleans, Miramichi did not receive large numbers of destitute and starving Irish during the famine years. Fewer than four so-called coffin ships made it to Miramichi between 1844 and 1849 with less than three hundred people on board. They were ships plying to Quebec with sick and dying passengers, stricken with cholera and other diseases. They diverted to 'Miramichi in desperation and on arrival were quarantined at Middle Island where they were treated in appalling conditions. There was great fear of them and some Miramichers including the Irish referred to them as yellow mealers believing all they had had to eat was corn. The arrival of the famine ship Looshtauk on June 2, 1847, was a major tragedy at Miramichi. She left Liverpool for Quebec with 462 passengers on board. During the first two weeks at sea more than 100 died of sickness and the majority of the crew contracted severe fever and were unfit for duty. With only a few able seamen available to man the ship and few other options, the captain headed to the nearest port - Miramichi. When news of the dire conditions on board became known she was forbidden by the port authorities to dock even at Middle Island. The captain could not get permission to land the sick and dying or to bury the dead for over six days in which further severe anguish and the loss of forty more lives occurred. The arrival of two more famine ships the Richard White and the Bolivar further exacerbated the problem. The authorities finally but reluctantly constructed temporary shelters on the island and allowed the sick passengers and crew to land. A further fifty or so people died in the makeshift facilities provided, including the young Chatham doctor John Vondy who volunteered to stay full-time to administer to the sick and dying and within a few days succumbed to the fever himself.

=== The Irish in the 1870s and 1880s ===
By the 1870s the Irish were well established in Miramichi and by this decade less than 20% of them were recent immigrants. In total they represented forty percent of the population of the region spread fairly evenly over the entire Miramichi watershed. Eighty percent were Catholic and only the upriver parish of Ludlow had a Protestant Irish majority. By the 1880s they controlled 15% of businesses and professions in the town of Chatham and probably the same number in Newcastle. However the majority were still listed as skilled and unskilled workers.

=== Industry and politics (1765–1850) ===
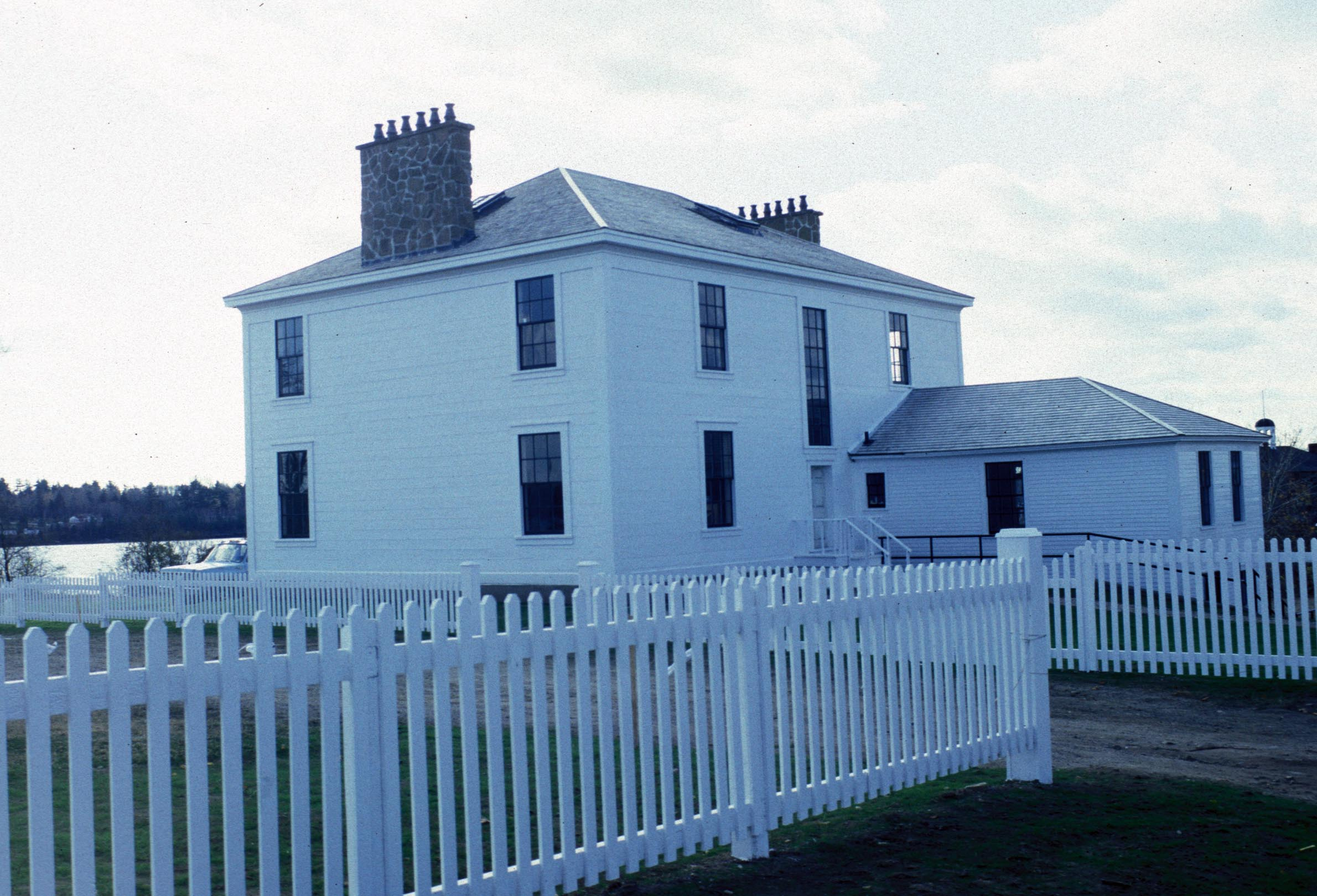
Rankin House, former home of Miramichi lumber baron Alexander Rankin at Douglastown

Although subsistence farming constituted one part of the new settlement's economy, the thin, acid soils of the Miramichi were not conducive to agriculture; thus, the lumber industry and Atlantic salmon fishery were the mainstays. A shipbuilding industry was established by Davidson in 1773, largely to facilitate overseas lumber exports, including masts for the British navy, and to provide winter employment for the men. Davidson's first ship, "Miramichi", was lost with her cargo off the Spanish coast.

Miramichi benefited greatly from the Napoleonic Wars and American independence, as Britain became dependent on its remaining North American colonies, including New Brunswick, for lumber. However, the 1825 Miramichi fire, the advent of steel-hulled ships, and perhaps over-cutting of eastern white pine, would eventually contribute to a long-term decline in the area's economy. The Miramichi Fire burnt almost 1/4 of New Brunswick's forest, and consumed most of the buildings along the northern side of the river. Only 12 buildings remained in Newcastle.

The towns of Newcastle and Chatham developed a long history of rivalry, including a small "war" fought between the communities ("the fighting election of 1843"). The 1843 election was fought on a political level between John T. Williston of Chatham (supported by local entrepreneur Joseph Cunard of Chatham, brother of Samuel Cunard) and John Ambrose Street of Newcastle (backed by the prominent lumber baron, Alexander Rankin of Douglastown). The Rankin and Cunard factions literally fought the election in the streets of Newcastle and Chatham with sticks, stones, coal and other missiles.

=== Railway (1875–1950) ===
In 1875, the region's largest construction project in history was completed when the federal government's Intercolonial Railway (ICR) opened between Moncton and Campbellton. The following year it would link Halifax with Rivière-du-Loup and the Canadian railway network. One of the biggest geographic obstacles presented in the project was the crossing of the Miramichi River. Surveyors deemed the ideal location for bridging to be at the upper reaches of tidewater between Nelson and Newcastle, crossing the Southwest Miramichi, then a short section of land at Derby, followed by the Northwest Miramichi. The combined length of these bridges would be among the largest constructed to date in Canada (surpassed only by the Victoria Bridge in Montreal) and were the first bridges over the Miramichi River, revolutionizing transport in the region.

The ICR bypassed Chatham by running through Newcastle and then on to the north and west. Within a decade, the Canada Eastern Railway was built to link Chatham with Fredericton, along the length of the Southwest Miramichi River valley. In 1904, the Canada Eastern was purchased by the ICR. In 1915, the ICR became part of Canadian Government Railways and 3 years later in 1918 it became part of the Canadian National Railway (CNR).

CNR operated express passenger trains along the main line from Halifax to Montreal via Newcastle, most notably the Ocean Limited, along with various local trains to Fredericton, Moncton and Campbellton. The Dungarvon Whooper provided passenger service along the Canada Eastern Railway from Newcastle to Fredericton. The ports and railways serving Newcastle and Chatham burgeoned with activity as the 19th century lumber industry gave way to the 20th century developments in pulp and paper, and mining.

=== 20th century industry and politics ===
Communities amalgamated in 1995 to form the City of Miramichi

As the shipbuilding, masting and lumber industries waned, pulp and paper production eventually replaced lumber exports as the mainstay of the area's economy. A valuable sports fishery developed, attracting "sports" initially from adjacent New England, and subsequently from all parts of the world. In the mid 20th century, an air force base, CFB Chatham, became the cornerstone of Chatham's economy. The discovery of base metal deposits (lead, zinc, copper, silver, and traces of gold).) and the development of Heath Steele Mines, 60 km to the northwest, allowed Newcastle's economy to diversify and strengthen through the 1960s. The mine and air force base had both closed by 1999 as the mine's ore body was depleted, and with the collapse of the Cold War. The forest industry reemerged as the dominant player in the city's economy today.

In the 20th century the rivalry between Newcastle and Chatham continued, expressed chiefly through sports, politics, and in competition for businesses and government largesse. In 1994 then Premier Frank McKenna (the Member of the Legislative Assembly for Chatham) developed and implemented a plan for merging the communities. The amalgamation of the former towns and villages to form the City of Miramichi was controversial at the time, and remains so today, due in part to the strong identities that each of the communities possessed. The 1995 amalgamation of the communities served to limit local rivalries, giving the region a larger and more united voice in promoting the region. In addition to this, many smaller communities in the Miramichi Valley felt that the name of the newly formed city was a threat to their tourism industry, and to their identity as "Miramichiers".

== Economy ==
The Miramichi area's economy is primarily focused on mining, fishing and forestry. Other sectors include tourism, customer contact centres, manufacturing, and the provincial and federal government. The service sector is the city's largest employer. The two best known call centres are the Canadian Firearms Program, and the Phoenix pay system. The region has recently experienced the closure of several wood mills causing many residents to migrate west. Since the oilsands boom in Alberta, many Miramichi residents split their time between the oil fields and Miramichi.

The Repap paper mill (between the Anderson and Miramichi Bridges) was purchased by UPM in 2000, and was later closed in 2007 because of economic pressures in the North American forest industry and subsequently demolished. A closed Weyerhauser OSB mill at Morrison Cove was subsequently purchased by Arbec, a Quebec-based company and the mill re-opened in 2013 producing OSB products.

== Transportation ==
=== Roads ===
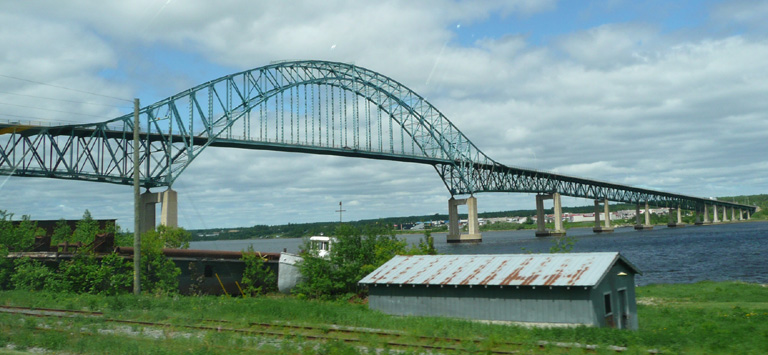
Centennial Bridge

Miramichi has good highway connections to other major centres in New Brunswick offered via Highways 8 (west to Fredericton; north to Bathurst and Campbellton) and 11 (south to Moncton, Prince Edward Island and Nova Scotia). The Plaster Rock – Renous highway (Route 108) offers the quickest connection to major centres in Quebec, Ontario, and points west.

For many years, the only bridge at Miramichi was a narrow, historic crossing called the Morrissy Bridge, at Newcastle. Ferry service facilitated crossings at Chatham and Loggieville. In the late 1960s the Centennial Bridge was completed at Chatham, greatly improving north–south transit across the river. The Miramichi Bridge at Newcastle opened in the late 1990s.

=== Bus ===
Miramichi Transit also operates local bus service within the city.

=== Water ===
The towns of Chatham and Newcastle were formerly important ports for northeastern New Brunswick. Dredging, however, was necessary to maintain a deep enough channel for most ships to cross between the barrier dune islands at the mouth of Miramichi Bay. Ocean-going ships entering the port must have a shallow draft, and must navigate the ancient, meandering course of the drowned Miramichi River channel through the inner Bay.

HTI / High Tech Industries owns and operates the marine terminal situated close below the Morrisey Bridge in Miramichi West (the former town of Newcastle). The site contains approximately 21,625 m^{2} (5.34 acres) of property, with a berthage length of 313 m and a depth of 9 m. Two unheated storage sheds are located on the property containing 10,300 m^{2} and 2325 m^{2} of enclosed storage area. There is an open storage area of 9000 square metres.

=== Rail ===
The Canadian National Railway (CN) northern line between Moncton and Campbellton passes through Miramichi. Miramichi was served by the New Brunswick East Coast Railway (NBECR) until it was purchased by CN in 2008. Via Rail offers passenger service on this line at the Miramichi railway station via the Ocean train to Montreal and Halifax.

=== Air ===
Miramichi is located within a 90-minute drive of two international airports (Fredericton International Airport, Greater Moncton International Airport) with scheduled domestic and international flights. Bathurst Airport (New Brunswick) is located within a 50 minute drive offering flights to Montreal. In addition the Miramichi Airport Commission operates the Miramichi Airport (YCH) on the former site of CFB Chatham.

== Arts and culture ==
=== Roots ===
As in other regions of the Maritimes, Miramichi culture is firmly grounded in the Mi'kmaq, Acadian, English, Scottish, and Irish traditions of the region's founding population, particularly in the fishing, sailing and lumbering industries. Every bend in the rivers, from Push and Be Damned Rapids to the Turnip Patch has a distinctive name. These roots and the lives of their ancestors provided inspiration for the novels of local author David Adams Richards, the tales and folklore of Herb Curtis, and the fiction and non-fiction books of Chatham writer Raymond Fraser. Local young adult author Valerie Sherrard's first historical novel, Three Million Acres of Flame, deals with the 1825 Miramichi Fire, one of the largest recorded land fires in North American history.

=== Festivals ===
Local festivals which celebrate Miramichi culture, and the ancestral roots of the original settlers include:

- Miramichi Folksong Festival
- Annual Pow-wows hosted on the nearby Eel Ground First Nation, Burnt Church First Nation, and Metepenagiag Mi'kmaq Nation
- La Fête Nationale des Acadiens—Acadian Day
- Miramichi Scottish Festival
- Canada's Irish Festival on the Miramichi
- Miramichi Fiddle Festival

Other local festivals include:

- Canada Days Festival
- Miramichi Rock 'n Roll Festival
- Miramichi Salmon Classic
- Miramichi Exhibition

=== Newspapers ===
- The Miramichi Leader
- The Telegraph-Journal

=== Radio ===
- CJFY-FM 96.5 & 107.7 LIFE Radio, FM
- CFAN-FM 99.3 The River, FM
- CHHI-FM Rewind 95.9, FM
- CKMA-FM 93.9 Radio Miracadie, FM

== Recreation ==
The city offers a full range of summer and winter sports programs and facilities, including recreation centres, swimming pools, a golf course, and rinks for skating, curling and ice hockey. The city, however, is best known as a haven for outdoor sport enthusiasts. The river offers whitewater opportunities for canoe and kayak, and angling for Atlantic salmon and brook trout. About one-half of the sport catch of Atlantic salmon in North America are landed on the Miramichi River and its tributaries. The warm waters of Miramichi Bay offer an ideal setting for sailing enthusiasts during summer. The snowy winters are welcomed by cross-country skiers and snowmobilers. An extensive network of trails is available for hiking, cycling, birding, skiing, and snowmobiling.

=== Team sports ===
Miramichi has several sports teams, including two ice hockey teams. The home rink of the Miramichi Timberwolves of the Maritime Junior Hockey League is the Miramichi Civic Centre.

The city's baseball team, the Chatham Ironmen, winner of the 1995 Canadian Senior Baseball Nationals, plays in the New Brunswick Senior Baseball League at Ironmen Field.

== Education ==
Miramichi is served by 11 public schools operated by the New Brunswick Department of Education. Post-secondary education, including a distance education component from the University of New Brunswick, is offered primarily through the Miramichi campus of New Brunswick Community College.

Public schools

Francophone Sud School District:

- École Carrefour Beausoleil (K-12)

New Brunswick Anglophone North School District (English):

- High schools:
  - James M. Hill Memorial High School
  - Miramichi Valley High School
  - North & South Esk Regional High School
- Middle schools:
  - Dr. Losier Middle School
  - Max Aitken Academy
  - Millerton Elementary & Junior High School
- Elementary schools:
  - Gretna Green Elementary School
  - King Street Elementary School
  - Nelson Rural School
  - Napan Elementary School
  - Millerton Elementary & Junior High School
  - Max Aitken Academy
  - North & South Esk Elementary School

Private schools

- Karasek School Of Dance
- L.F.M. Memorial Academy
- Miramichi Taekwondo Academy

Post-secondary

- Public:
  - New Brunswick Community College, Miramichi Campus
- Private:
  - Academy of Learning Career and Business College

== Demographics ==
Census	Population
	Chatham	Newcastle
1871	3,000	1,500
1901	4,868	2,507
1911	4,666	2,945
1921	4,506	3,507
1931	4,017	3,383
1941	4,082	3,781
1951	5,223	4,248
1961	7,109	5,236
1971	7,833	6,460
1981	6,779	6,284
1986	6,219	5,804
1991	6,544	5,711
	Miramichi
2001	18,508
2006	18,129
2011	17,811
2016	17,537
2021	17,692

In the 2021 Census of Population conducted by Statistics Canada, Miramichi had a population of 17,692 living in 7,990 of its 8,484 total private dwellings, a change of 0.9% from its 2016 population of 17,537. With a land area of 178.98 km^{2} (69.10 sq mi), it had a population density of 98.8/km^{2} (256.0/sq mi) in 2021.

In the 2001 Census of Canada, 48.1 percent of Miramichi's population was male and 51.9 percent was female.

Children under five accounted for approximately 5.0% of the resident population. This compares with 5.6% for Canada overall. In mid-2001, 15.5% of the resident population of Miramichi were of retirement age (65 and over for males and females) compared with 13.2% in Canada. The median age was 39.9 years of age, comparing to 37.6 years of age nationally.

In 2001, 97.6% of the population were born in Canada; 89.4% claimed "English only" as the "language(s) first learned and still understood", whereas 8.8% indicated French, and 0.7% indicated "both English and French". The population was 61.8% Roman Catholic, and 33.3% Protestant. 3.8% reported no religious affiliation.

Source: Statistics Canada 2001 Census

Population trend

Census	Population	Change (%)
2021	17,692	▲0.9%
2016	17,537	▼1.5%
2011	17,811	▼1.8%
2006	18,129	▼2.0%
2001	18,508	▼3.8%
1996	19,241	▼9.1%
1991	21,165	N/A

=== Ethnicity ===
Miramichi bills itself as "Canada's Irish Capital", and is home to an annual Irish festival. It is one of the most Irish cities in Canada.

Panethnic groups in the City of Miramichi (2001−2021)
Panethnic group	2021		2016		2011		2006		2001	
Panethnic group	Pop.	%	Pop.	%	Pop.	%	Pop.	%	Pop.	%
European (Note: Statistic includes all persons that did not make up part of a visible minority or an indigenous identity.)	15,735	91.51%	16,280	94.98%	16,815	96.8%	17,285	96.83%	17,810	97.72%
Indigenous	845	4.91%	555	3.24%	270	1.55%	310	1.74%	240	1.32%
Southeast Asian (Note: Statistic includes total responses of "Filipino" and "Southeast Asian" under visible minority section on census.)	210	1.22%	50	0.29%	0	0%	0	0%	10	0.05%
South Asian	135	0.79%	50	0.29%	75	0.43%	50	0.28%	80	0.44%
African	135	0.79%	95	0.55%	100	0.58%	40	0.22%	45	0.25%
East Asian (Note: Statistic includes total responses of "Chinese", "Korean", and "Japanese" under visible minority section on census.)	55	0.32%	90	0.53%	80	0.46%	45	0.25%	15	0.08%
Middle Eastern (Note: Statistic includes total responses of "West Asian" and "Arab" under visible minority section on census.)	30	0.17%	10	0.06%	0	0%	85	0.48%	10	0.05%
Latin American	20	0.12%	15	0.09%	0	0%	0	0%	0	0%
Other/multiracial (Note: Statistic includes total responses of "Visible minority, n.i.e." and "Multiple visible minorities" under visible minority section on census.)	40	0.23%	15	0.09%	0	0%	30	0.17%	10	0.05%
Total responses	17,195	97.19%	17,140	97.74%	17,370	97.52%	17,850	98.46%	18,225	98.47%
Total population	17,692	100%	17,537	100%	17,811	100%	18,129	100%	18,508	100%
Note: Totals greater than 100% due to multiple origin responses

=== Language ===
Mother tongue language (2006)

Language	Population	Pct (%)
English only	15,935	89.25%
French only	1,470	8.23%
Other languages	330	1.85%
Both English and French	120	0.67%

== Notable people ==
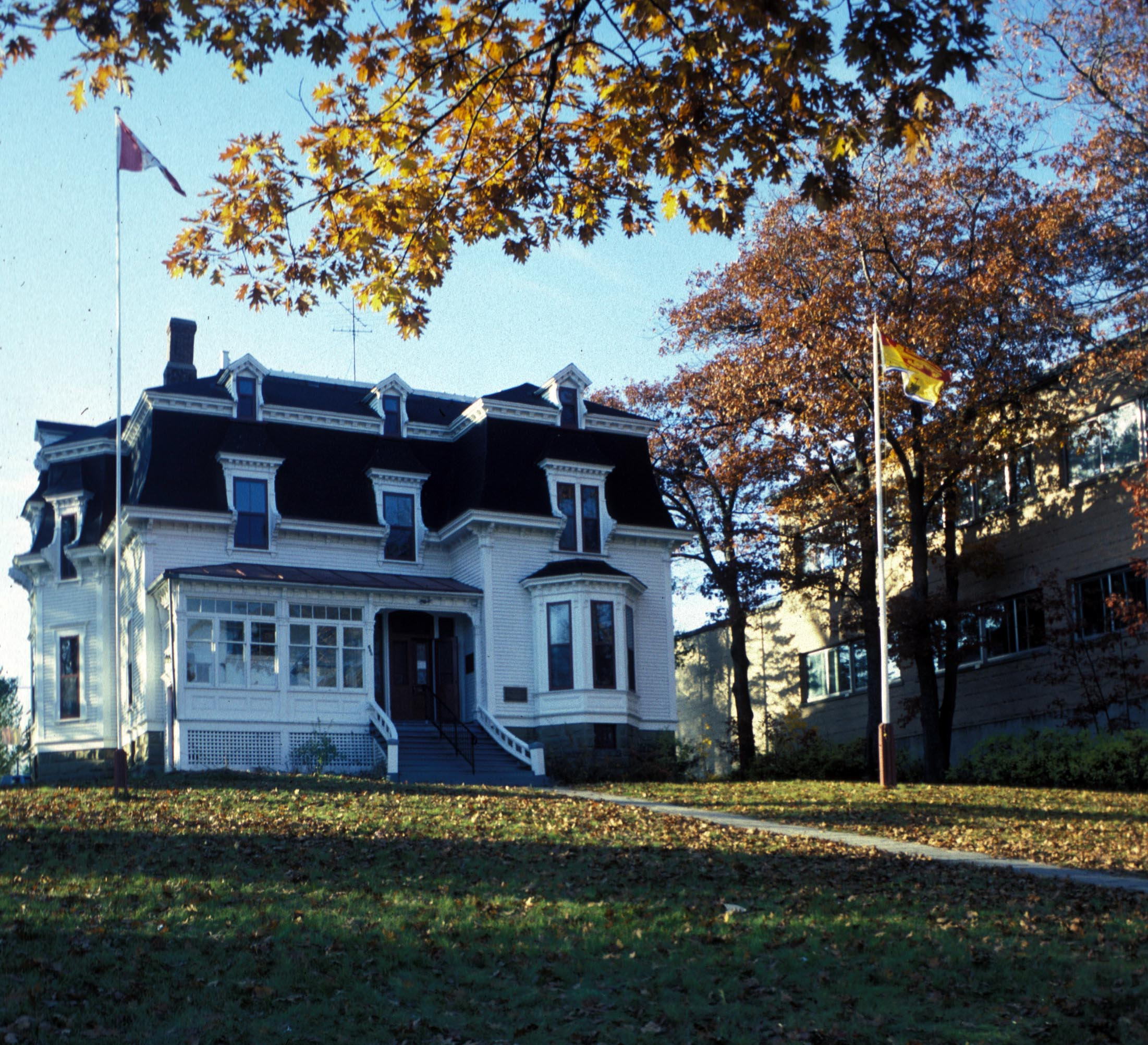
Beaverbrook House, formerly the Old Manse Library, and earlier the boyhood home of Max Aitken, Lord Beaverbrook, in Newcastle

== Visitor attractions ==
French Fort Cove

The Miramichi River is the centre of all activity. The communities that compose the city line its banks.

Beaubears Island, located in the middle of the Miramichi River between Newcastle and Nelson-Miramichi, is home to two National Historic Sites, Boishébert National Historic Site of Canada and Beaubears Island Shipbuilding National Historic Site of Canada, J. Leonard O'Brien Memorial. The island is recognized for its role in the Acadian Expulsion, and as the former home of a major shipbuilding industry.

French Fort Cove is a nature park located between Newcastle and Nordin. It is the former site of a gristmill, lumber mill and shipyard. It is also the former location of a rock quarry which was used to build many local buildings and the Langevin Block of the Parliament Hill, among others. It is the setting for the local legend of the Headless Nun.

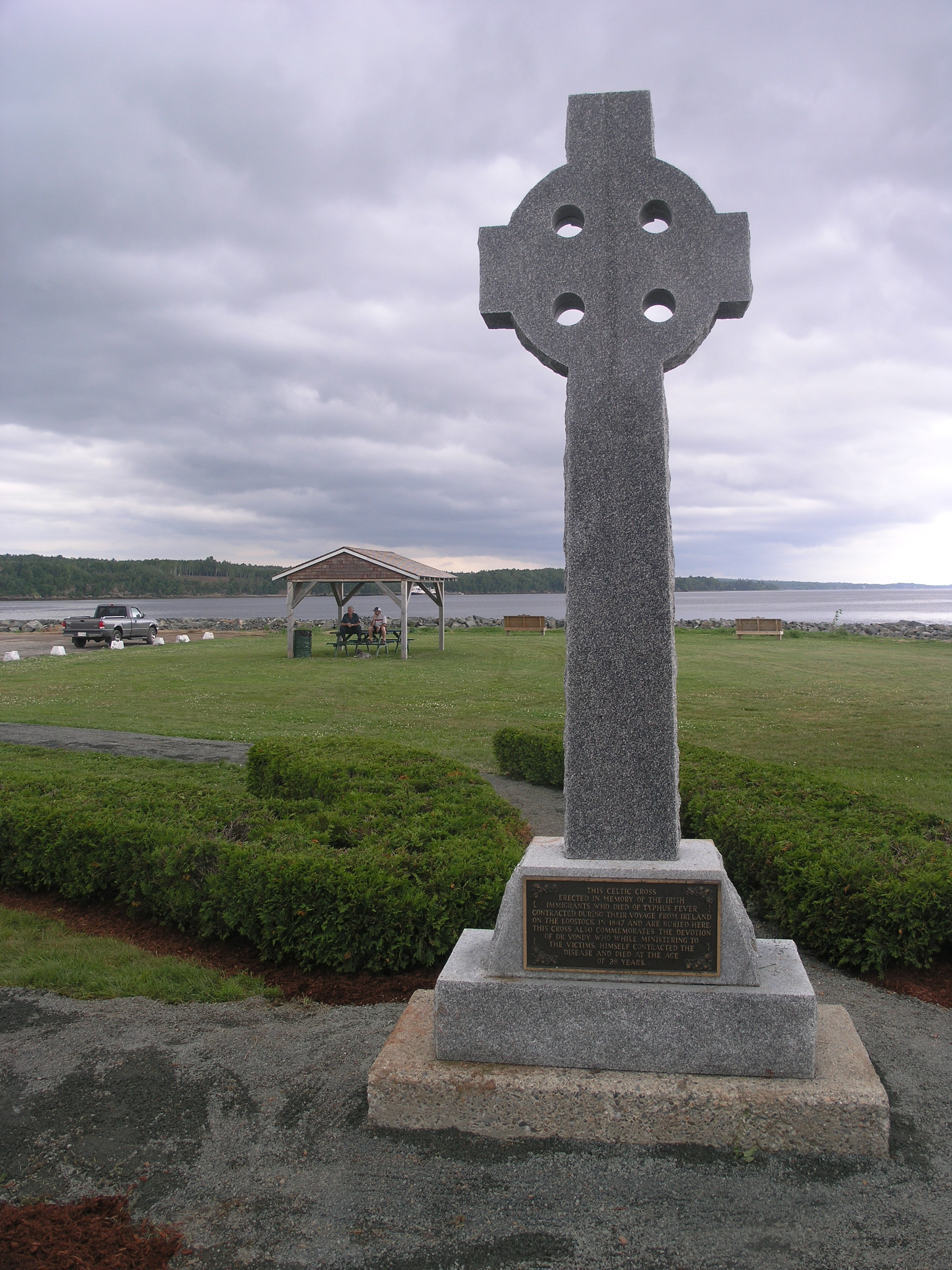
Irish Memorial on Middle Island

Middle Island was used as a quarantine station when, in 1847, typhus and scarlet fever spread throughout the ship Looshtauk as it crossed the Atlantic Ocean. Of the 462 passengers on board, at least 146 people died en route and 96 died while in quarantine. Initially those who died on the island were buried in caskets, but as the death toll continued to rise personal resting places could no longer be an option. This resulted in large mass graves being placed on the island. Some of these graves were discovered as recently as 1996.

Many people are able to trace their family roots back to the journey taken by the Looshtauk. The island now serves as a tourist location and memorial.

Alexander Rankin and James Gilmour came to the area in 1812 to establish a lumber and shipbuilding enterprise (Gilmour, Rankin & Co.) at Douglastown (then known as Gretna Green). Rankin House was constructed in 1837 as the home of Alexander Rankin and is now a museum containing a collection of objects relating to early life in New Brunswick. It is located in Douglastown on the King George Highway.

The Miramichi Natural History Museum (c. 1908 to 1909) is designated as a Local Historic Place.

Ritchie Wharf is a park located on the waterfront of Newcastle-Miramichi. It is the location of many events that take place on the river.

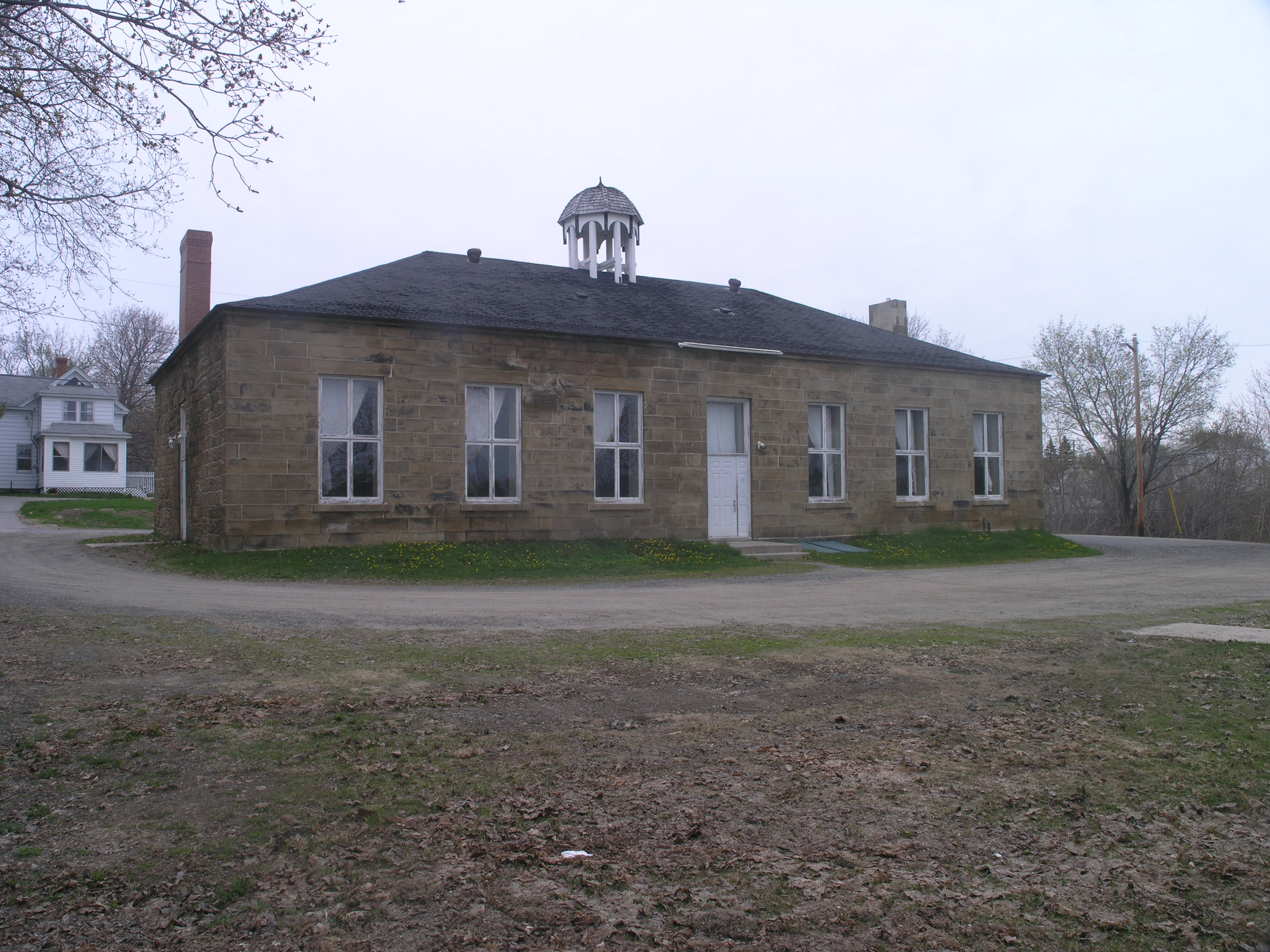
Marine Hospital

The Marine Hospital was built in 1830–1831, and was used to provide care to members of the shipping community involved in the lumber trade. It is the oldest surviving marine hospital in Canada, and now serves as a hall for a local church and the general public. It last opened its door to patients in 1921, and was designated a National Historic Site of Canada in September 2000.

== Twin city ==
Monaghan, Ireland. In 1999 Miramichi was twinned with the County Monaghan in Ireland. Monaghan, a county of some 55,000 people, is located in the north-east of the Republic of Ireland on the border with Northern Ireland. This link denotes the strong ancestral bonds between Ireland and New Brunswick and Canada generally. Each year delegations from Monaghan and Miramichi exchange visits.

Carpiquet, France. In 2022 Miramichi was twinned with the commune based in Calvados.

== Climate ==
Miramichi enjoys a cool, moist climate with a mean annual temperature of 5.3 °C (41.5 °F). The January mean temperature is −9.8 °C (14.4 °F), and the mean July temperature is 19.6 °C (67.3 °F). Proximity to the Gulf of St. Lawrence tends to moderate the winter climate, but Arctic air sometimes penetrates into the area during winter. The city averages 1,083.3 mm (42.6 in) of precipitation per year, with 291.4 cm (114.7 in) falling as snow. Miramichi winters are sunnier than almost anywhere else in Canada, averaging 120 hours of bright sunshine in January. Miramichi averages 251.2 hours of bright sunshine in July.

The highest temperature ever recorded in Miramichi was 38.9 °C (102 °F) on 18 & 19 August 1935. The coldest temperature ever recorded was −41.7 °C (−43 °F) on 19 January 1925.

Climate data for Miramichi Airport, 1991−2020 normals, extremes 1873−present (Note: Climate data was recorded at Chatham from January 1873 to April 1947 and at Miramichi Airport from January 1943 to present.)
Month	Jan	Feb	Mar	Apr	May	Jun	Jul	Aug	Sep	Oct	Nov	Dec	Year
Record high °C (°F)	13.6 (56.5)	15.3 (59.5)	26.3 (79.3)	29.5 (85.1)	35.3 (95.5)	37.2 (99.0)	37.0 (98.6)	38.9 (102.0)	35.9 (96.6)	30.8 (87.4)	24.3 (75.7)	17.1 (62.8)	38.9 (102.0)
Mean daily maximum °C (°F)	−4.3 (24.3)	−3.0 (26.6)	2.0 (35.6)	8.6 (47.5)	16.3 (61.3)	22.0 (71.6)	25.5 (77.9)	24.8 (76.6)	20.2 (68.4)	12.7 (54.9)	5.5 (41.9)	−0.8 (30.6)	10.8 (51.4)
Daily mean °C (°F)	−9.8 (14.4)	−8.9 (16.0)	−3.4 (25.9)	3.3 (37.9)	10.2 (50.4)	15.9 (60.6)	19.6 (67.3)	18.8 (65.8)	14.3 (57.7)	7.6 (45.7)	1.3 (34.3)	−5.2 (22.6)	5.3 (41.5)
Mean daily minimum °C (°F)	−15.3 (4.5)	−14.8 (5.4)	−8.8 (16.2)	−2.0 (28.4)	4.0 (39.2)	9.8 (49.6)	13.8 (56.8)	12.9 (55.2)	8.3 (46.9)	2.5 (36.5)	−2.9 (26.8)	−9.6 (14.7)	−0.2 (31.6)
Record low °C (°F)	−41.7 (−43.1)	−39.4 (−38.9)	−32.2 (−26.0)	−20.0 (−4.0)	−8.9 (16.0)	−2.2 (28.0)	2.8 (37.0)	0.6 (33.1)	−5.0 (23.0)	−11.1 (12.0)	−24.4 (−11.9)	−34.4 (−29.9)	−41.7 (−43.1)
Average precipitation mm (inches)	86.7 (3.41)	71.8 (2.83)	93.9 (3.70)	84.4 (3.32)	97.0 (3.82)	89.1 (3.51)	89.8 (3.54)	85.4 (3.36)	89.7 (3.53)	113.1 (4.45)	93.3 (3.67)	89.1 (3.51)	1,083.3 (42.65)
Average rainfall mm (inches)	21.5 (0.85)	18.1 (0.71)	34.1 (1.34)	58.7 (2.31)	97.5 (3.84)	86.3 (3.40)	99.9 (3.93)	93.1 (3.67)	83.8 (3.30)	87.0 (3.43)	75.2 (2.96)	38.6 (1.52)	793.9 (31.26)
Average snowfall cm (inches)	70.4 (27.7)	54.6 (21.5)	59.6 (23.5)	25.8 (10.2)	1.7 (0.7)	0.0 (0.0)	0.0 (0.0)	0.0 (0.0)	0.0 (0.0)	2.6 (1.0)	26.8 (10.6)	49.9 (19.6)	291.4 (114.7)
Average precipitation days (≥ 0.2 mm)	13.5	11.7	13.8	13.8	14.8	13.1	13.5	11.4	11.0	14.1	14.1	14.0	158.7
Average rainy days (≥ 0.2 mm)	3.5	3.3	6.6	11.7	15.4	13.5	14.7	12.6	12.0	13.4	11.5	5.8	123.9
Average snowy days (≥ 0.2 cm)	12.0	9.1	9.8	5.3	0.56	0.0	0.0	0.0	0.0	0.48	5.5	10.2	52.9
Average relative humidity (%)	69.4	64.4	63.3	58.1	55.2	53.5	55.5	55.3	57.7	58.3	69.6	71.1	61.0
Mean monthly sunshine hours	119.8	122.4	153.8	157.4	200.4	234.7	251.2	226.7	171.7	142.7	91.2	101.7	1,973.7
Percentage possible sunshine	43.0	42.4	41.8	38.7	43.0	49.5	52.4	51.4	45.5	42.2	32.3	38.2	43.4
Source: Environment Canada (rain, snow, sun 1981−2010)

== See also ==
Founding communities:

- Nelson
- Chatham
- Douglastown
- Loggieville
- Newcastle
- Napan

Other:

- History of the Maritime provinces of Canada
- List of communities in New Brunswick
