= Black River-Hardwicke =

Coordinates: 47.0764°N 65.0168°W

Location of Black River-Hardwicke in New Brunswick

Black River-Hardwicke was a local service district in Northumberland County, New Brunswick. It is now part of the Greater Miramichi rural district.

== Demographics ==
In the 2021 Census of Population conducted by Statistics Canada, Black River-Hardwicke had a population of 1,067 living in 483 of its 601 total private dwellings, a change of 1.8% from its 2016 population of 1,048. With a land area of 222.65 km^{2} (85.97 sq mi), it had a population density of 4.8/km^{2} (12.4/sq mi) in 2021.

Population of Black River-Hardwicke
Name	Parish	Population (2021)	Population (2016)	Change	Land area (km^{2})	Population density
Black River-Hardwicke part A	Glenelg	726	690	+5.2%	157.84	4.6/km^{2}
Black River-Hardwicke part B	Hardwicke	341	358	−4.7%	64.81	5.3/km^{2}
Total	—	1,067	1,048	+1.8%	222.65	4.8/km^{2}

== See also ==
- List of local service districts in New Brunswick
