= Napan River =

Tributary in New Brunswick, Canada

Coordinates: 46°59′38.1″N 65°17′30.7″W

The Napan River in Canada is a tributary of the Miramichi River in New Brunswick, Canada. The river rises several kilometres southwest of Chatham in central Northumberland County and flows northeast into the Miramichi River at Napan Bay. Four bridges cross the river at various points: at Hannah Lane, Highway 11, Johnston Lane, and Highway 117. There was also once a crossing at White Lane. At one time, these bridges were covered, although all have been upgraded to steel and concrete structures.

the River's watershed is mostly rural, dominated by forests and small farms in the communities of Glenwood, Upper Napan, Centre Napan, Lower Napan and Napan Bay. The river is tidal below Lower Napan. It is generally well-buffered by sedimentary bedrock.

== See also ==
- List of rivers of New Brunswick
