= Black River (New Brunswick) =

River in New Brunswick, Canada

The Black River is located in Northumberland County, New Brunswick in Canada.

== See also ==
- List of rivers of New Brunswick
