= Miramichi Bay =

Coordinates: 47°07′N 65°10′W

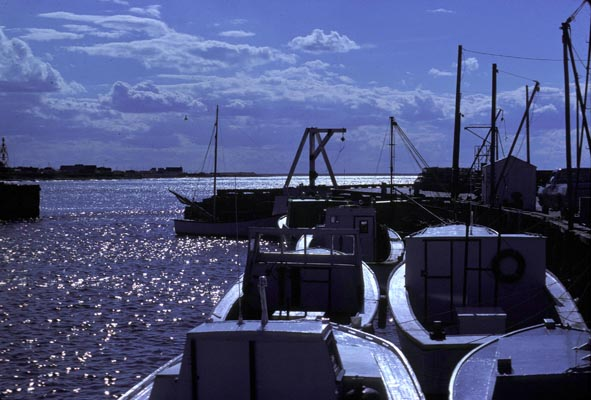
- Escuminac Wharf, Miramichi Bay, New Brunswick (IR Walker 1976)

- Location within New Brunswick Location within Canada
- Miramichi Bay
- Location: New Brunswick, Canada
- Type: Estuary
- Part of: Gulf of St. Lawrence
- Islands: Portage Island

Miramichi Bay is an estuary located on the west coast of the Gulf of St. Lawrence in New Brunswick, at the mouth of the Miramichi River. Miramichi Bay is separated into the "inner bay" and the "outer bay", with the division being a line of uninhabited barrier islands which are continually reshaped by ocean storms. The largest of these islands is the uninhabited Portage Island, which was broken in two during a violent storm in the 1950s. The islands provide some protection to the inner bay from ocean storms in the Gulf of St. Lawrence.

== Overview ==
Miramichi Bay is one of the largest bays along the northeastern coast of New Brunswick, Canada. The Maritime Plain, an area of low-relief extending from Chaleur Bay southward to Cape George, surrounds it. The Bay is a triangular shape, and approximately 45 km along the north and south coasts, and 32 km along the seaward end, making its surface area greater than 300 km^{2}.

Miramichi Bay was named Golfe Saint Lunaire by Jacques Cartier in 1534.

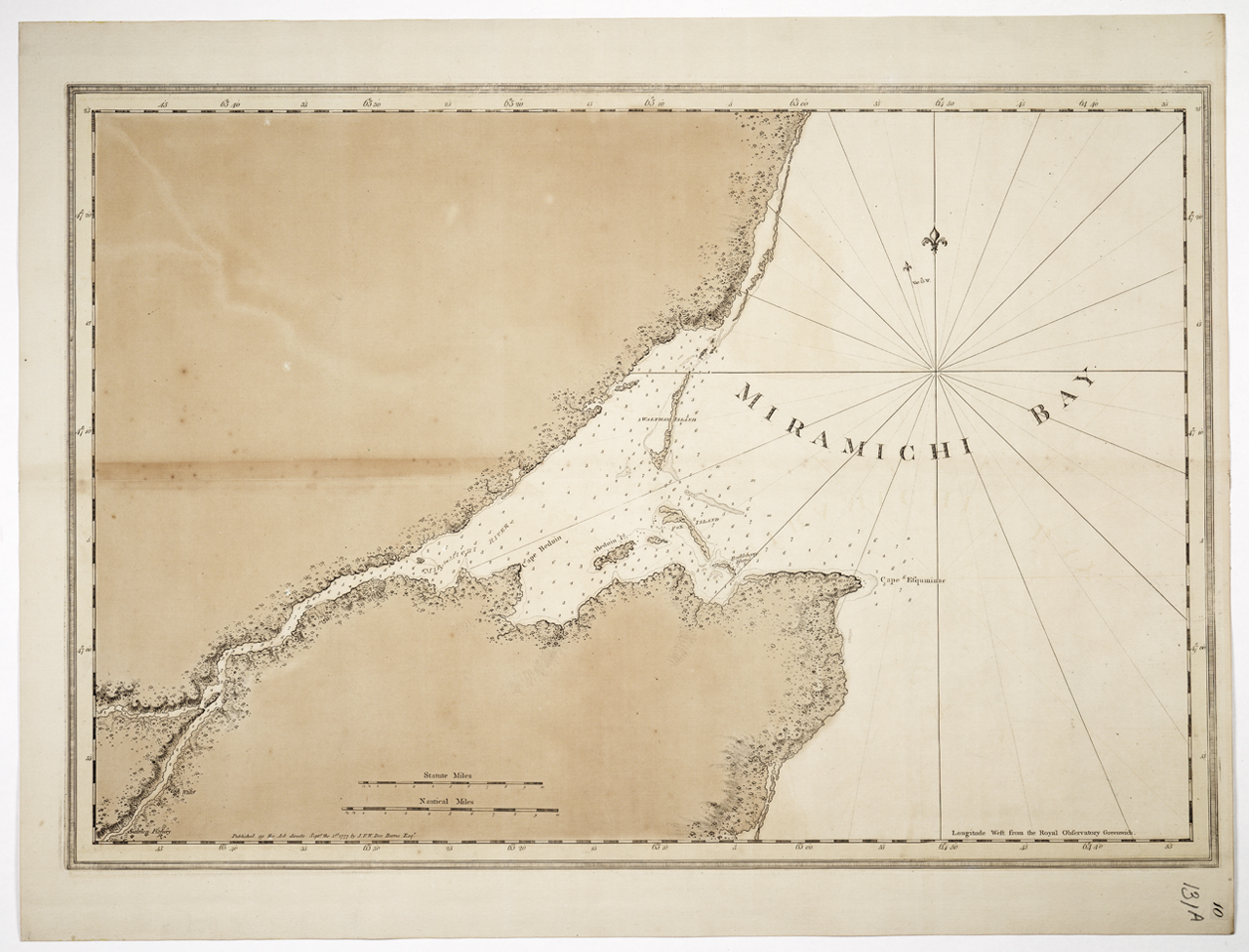
One of the original map depictions of Miramichi Bay, made and contributed by Joseph Frederick Wallet (1722-1824)

The Inner Miramichi Bay, and the lower portions of its tributary rivers (including the Miramichi River), are parts of a drowned river valley system. Since deglaciation, sea level rise in Miramichi Bay has flooded the mouths of these rivers with saltwater. The flooded, meandering, ancient Miramichi river channel forms a navigable route through the Inner Bay for ocean-going ships entering the port at Miramichi (formerly the ports of Chatham and Newcastle). The inner bay measures only 4 m deep on average, with the navigation channel measuring only 6–10 m. Since dredging maintenance of this channel has stopped, the port is now only accessible to ships with a shallow draft.

The estuary is a highly dynamic environment, subject to high freshwater outflows during the spring freshet, low outflow and rising saltwater content during the summer period, fall ocean storms and nor'easters which reshape the barrier islands and the old river channel, and winter sea ice which encases the entire estuary. The shallow inner bay warms rapidly during summer. The diurnal tide cycle ranges only 1 m on average. Continued sea level rise is very slowly inundating adjacent low-lying areas and promoting rapid erosion of the low sandstone cliffs bordering the bay.

The estuary is significant in that it is a highly productive ecosystem, despite its relatively small size. The estuary receives the freshwater discharge from the Miramichi River and its tributaries, giving local waters somewhat lower salinity. Organic materials from the surrounding shorelines and inflowing rivers contribute, together with the warm water, to the bay's high productivity.

== Paleoceanography of Inner Miramichi Bay ==
Observations of the changes in sediment texture and foraminiferal and molluscan assemblages in studies have shown the development of a barrier island system that developed during the last 4400 to 3600 years.

== Recreational uses ==
Recreational uses in Miramichi Bay include windsurfing, boating, kayaking as well as fresh and salt water fishing. Birdwatching is also common near Miramichi Bay because of the scenic views and habitat friendly area for many varieties of migrating birds.

== Climate ==
The climate of Miramichi Bay is constituted as continental. As air mass moves from west to east from the Pacific to the Atlantic we see an average annual air temperature around 4.3 degrees Celsius. Precipitation is regular in this area, averaging about 160 days within the year and totaling around 995 mm. Water temperatures reach a maximum of 22 degrees Celsius during July and August, and freezing during November to December.

== Marine ecosystem ==
=== Marine life ===
Marine life includes harbour seals, herring gulls, the common tern (pictars to use the old Scottish word), the great blue heron (commonly called "crane" in the Miramichi), the common loon, and cormorants (called "black shag" locally), with kingfishers, plovers, snipe and killdeer along the shore. Fish living within the estuary that may commonly be fished for recreation also include cod, eel, striped bass, Atlantic salmon, and brook trout. Along the inner bay you may commonly find juvenile and adult lobster, and in the outer bay you will find crab, who are restricted to the deeper water.
