= Southesk Parish, New Brunswick =

Southesk
- Parish
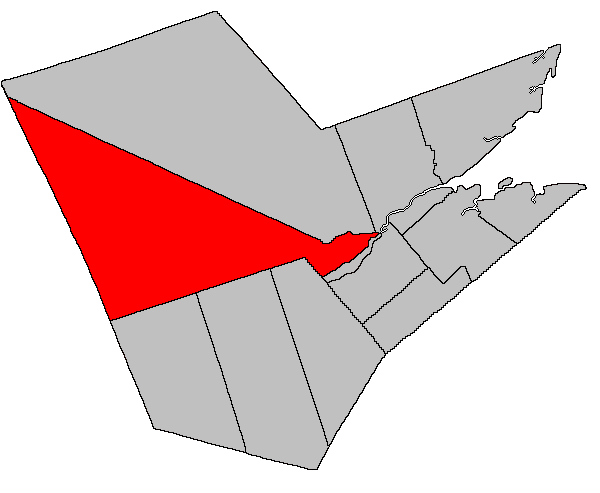
- Location within Northumberland County, New Brunswick
- Coordinates: 46.9775°N 66.48°W
- Country: Canada
- Province: New Brunswick
- County: Northumberland
- Erected: 1879

Area
  - Land: 2,462.60 km^{2} (950.82 sq mi)

Population (2021)
  - Total: 1,666
  - Density: 0.7/km^{2} (1.8/sq mi)
  - Change 2016-2021: ▼1.7%
  - Dwellings: 813
- Time zone: UTC-4 (AST)
  - Summer (DST): UTC-3 (ADT)
- Figures do not include portion within the Red Bank 4 Indian reserve

Southesk is a geographic parish in Northumberland County, New Brunswick, Canada. (Note: The Territorial Division Act divides the province into 152 parishes, the cities of Saint John and Fredericton, and one town of Grand Falls. The Interpretation Act clarifies that parishes include any local government within their borders.)

For governance purposes it is divided between the Indian reserve of Red Bank 4, the incorporated rural community of Miramichi River Valley, and the Greater Miramichi rural district, the last two of which are members of the Greater Miramichi Regional Service Commission.

Prior to the 2023 governance reform, all of the parish outside the Indian reserve formed the local service district of the parish of South Esk.

== Origin of name ==
The parish takes its name from its position relative to Northesk Parish.

== History ==
Southesk was erected in 1879 from Northesk Parish south of the Northwest Miramichi River and a northwestern line starting at the mouth of the Little Southwest Miramichi River. The Derby Parish boundary was significantly differently than it is today.

== Boundaries ==
Southesk Parish is bounded:

- on the north, beginning on the Victoria County line at a point about 150 metres south-southeast of Route 385, then running south 45º east (Note: By the magnet of 1879, when declination in the area was between 22º and 23º west of north. The Territorial Division Act clause referring to magnetic direction bearings was omitted in the 1952 and 1973 Revised Statutes.) to the mouth of the Little Southwest Miramichi River, then down the Northwest Miramichi River to a point about 825 metres downstream of the Route 8 bridge;
- on the east by a line from the middle of the Northwest Miramichi River to the northeastern corner of a grant to Charles Vye Sr., about 700 metres east of Enclosure Road;
- on the south by a line beginning at the northeastern corner of the Vye grant, then westerly in a straight line 116 chains (about 2.3 kilometres) to the southeastern line of a grant to Stephen Sherwood at a point about 700 metres slightly east of south of the junction of Route 420 and Creamer Road, then northwesterly to Old Creamer Road, then southwesterly about 600 metres along Old Creamer Road to the southwestern line of a grant to James Oxford, then northwesterly along the Oxford grant to its westernmost corner, then southwesterly and northwesterly along the rear line of grants on the Southwest Miramichi River, then northwesterly and southwesterly to exclude a grant to Jared Betts on the northeastern side of Williamstown Road, then southeasterly along Williamstown Road to rejoin the rear line of Southwest Miramichi River grants, then generally southwesterly along the river grants before turning westerly to exclude several inland grants straddling Route 8 south of Crocker Lake, then southwesterly to Route 8 at the northwest line of the Elm Tree Tract granted to William Davidson, then southwesterly along the Elm Tree Tract and its prolongation to the Blackville Parish line, about 1.8 kilometres northwesterly of Route 8, then northwesterly about 7 kilometres along a line running north 22º west (Note: By the magnet of 1850, when declination in the area was between 20º and 21º west of north.) from the mouth of the Renous River, then south 72º west by an astronomic bearing to the York County line;
- on the west by the York and Victoria county lines.

=== Evolution of boundaries ===
Southesk has had the same western, northern, and eastern boundaries from its creation; the boundary with Derby was a straight line running a line running south 68º west (Note: By the magnet of 1814, when declination in the area was between 16º and 17º west of north.) from modern Wilsons Point.

In 1920 the boundary with Derby Parish was changed to run along property and grant lines. The wording was ambiguous enough to require clarification in 1953 and 1954. The 1954 Act also changed the wording of the boundary with Blackville, Blissfield, and Ludlow Parishes to run partly by an astronomic rather than a magnetic bearing.

== Communities ==
Communities at least partly within the parish. bold indicates an Indian reserve

- Cassilis
- Dennis
- Garden Road
- Halcomb
- Harris Brook Settlement
- Loggie Lodge
- Lyttleton
- Matthews
- Pratts Camp
- Ramsay Lodge
- Red Bank
- **Red Bank 4**
- **Red Bank 7**
- Red Rock
- Sillikers
- South Esk
- Warwick Settlement
- Williamstown

== Bodies of water ==
Bodies of water (Note: Not including brooks, ponds or coves.) at least partly within the parish.

- Big Sevogle River
- Dungarvon River
- Little Sevogle River
- Little Southwest Miramichi River
- Northwest Miramichi River
- Renous River
- Serpentine River
- Tuadook River
  - Crooked Deadwater
  - The Horseback
- Little Ottawa Branch
- Northwest Inlet
- Guagus Stream
- Mullin Stream
- North Pole Stream
- Catamaran Lake
- Holmes Lake
- Little Trousers Lakes
- Lost Beaver Lake
- more than eighty other officially named lakes

== Islands ==
Islands at least partly within the parish.

- Gibbons Island
- Johnsons Island

== Other notable places ==
Parks, historic sites, and other noteworthy places at least partly within the parish.

- Adder Lakes Protected Natural Area
- Christmas Mountains
- Gover Mountain Protected Natural Area
- Kennedy Lakes Protected Natural Area
- Little Southwest Miramichi River Protected Natural Area
- Lower North Branch Little Southwest Miramichi River Protected Natural Area
- McCarty Brook Protected Natural Area
- McNeal Brook Protected Natural Area
- Miller Brook Protected Natural Area
- Nalaisk Mountain Protected Natural Area
- North Pole Stream Protected Natural Area
- Patchell Brook Protected Natural Area
- Plaster Rock-Renous Wildlife Management Area
- Tauadook River Protected Natural Area
- Upper Dungarvon River Protected Natural Area
- Wilson's Point Wildlife Refuge

== Demographics ==
Parish population total does not include Indian reserves

=== Population ===
**Population trend**

Census	Population	Change (%)
2016	1,694	▼7.6%
2011	1,833	▼6.6%
2006	1,964	▼5.7%
2001	2,083	▼4.4%
1996	2,178	▲3.8%
1991	2,098	N/A

=== Language ===
**Mother tongue language (2006)**

Language	Population	Pct (%)
English only	1,820	93.57%
French only	70	3.60%
Other languages	45	2.31%
Both English and French	10	0.52%

== See also ==
- List of parishes in New Brunswick
