= List of historic places in Northumberland County, New Brunswick =

This is a list of historic places in Northumberland County, New Brunswick entered on the Canadian Register of Historic Places, whether they are federal, provincial, or municipal.

== List of historic places ==
Name	Address	Coordinates	Government recognition (CRHP №)	Wikidata ID	Image
David Anderson House	2155 King George Highway; Miramichi NB	47°01′22″N 65°30′48″W	Miramichi municipality (6157)		Upload Photo
Senator Anderson Residence	139 Pleasant Street; Miramichi NB	46°59′50″N 65°34′08″W	Miramichi municipality (8909)		Upload Photo
William Anderson House	57 King Street; Miramichi NB	47°01′47″N 65°27′45″W	Miramichi municipality (5412)		Upload Photo
Argyle House	1729 Water St. Miramichi NB	47°01′47″N 65°28′14″W	Miramichi municipality (9407)		Upload Photo
Augustine Mound	South Esk NB	46°55′53″N 65°49′10″W	Federal (3998)		Upload Photo
Bamford Rock	Mitchell Pond, Southwest Miramichi River; Doaktown NB	46°34′06″N 66°05′20″W	Doaktown municipality (9832)		Upload Photo
Bamford Store	342 Main Street; Doaktown NB	46°33′15″N 66°08′07″W	Doaktown municipality (9861)		Upload Photo
William A. Bamford Residence	2 Central Street; Doaktown NB	46°33′15″N 66°08′02″W	Doaktown municipality (8094)		Upload Photo
James Bean Store	161 Main Street; Miramichi River Valley NB	46°44′23″N 65°49′52″W	Miramichi River Valley municipality (9668)		Upload Photo
Beaubears Island Shipbuilding	Route 8, Northwest Bridge; Derby Parish NB	46°58′23″N 65°34′11″W	Federal (7650)		
Beaverbrook House	518 King George Highway; Miramichi NB	47°00′00″N 65°34′07″W	New Brunswick (6225), Miramichi municipality (8840)		
George Blair Residence	186 Wellington Street; Miramichi NB	47°01′47″N 65°27′59″W	Miramichi municipality (8031)		Upload Photo
Blake House	4424 Water Street; Miramichi NB	47°04′19″N 65°22′48″W	Miramichi municipality (5513)		Upload Photo
Boishébert	Highway 8, Northwest Bridge; Miramichi NB	46°58′20″N 65°34′24″W	Federal (1169)		
Boiestown United Church	3571 Route 625; Upper Miramichi NB	46°27′22″N 66°25′14″W	Upper Miramichi municipality (14062)		
Boutique Mode Elle	11081 Principale Street; Nouvelle-Arcadie NB	46°43′45″N 65°25′29″W	Nouvelle-Arcadie municipality (8396)		Upload Photo
Henry Braithwaite Cabin	6342 Route #8; Upper Miramichi NB	46°28′03″N 66°23′48″W	Upper Miramichi municipality (14042)		Upload Photo
Brander House	541 King George Highway; Miramichi NB	47°00′06″N 65°34′07″W	Miramichi municipality (5562)		Upload Photo
Brander Store	136 Newcastle Boulevard; Miramichi NB	47°00′08″N 65°33′54″W	Miramichi municipality (8035)		Upload Photo
Breau's Barber Shop	18 Cunard Street; Miramichi NB	47°01′46″N 65°28′13″W	Miramichi municipality (8825)		Upload Photo
Bremner Cottage	2458 Water Street; Miramichi NB	47°03′08″N 65°26′41″W	Miramichi municipality (5618)		Upload Photo
Bremner Hotel	2460 Water Street; Miramichi NB	47°03′09″N 65°26′39″W	Miramichi municipality (5628)		Upload Photo
Buccleuch Place	25 Shirreff Street; Miramichi NB	47°01′45″N 65°27′50″W	Miramichi municipality (5630)		Upload Photo
Buttermilk Davey's	1760 Water Street; Miramichi NB	47°01′49″N 65°28′11″W	Miramichi municipality (12075)		Upload Photo
W.A. Campbell Store	6152 Route 8 Upper Miramichi NB	46°27′24″N 66°24′58″W	Upper Miramichi municipality (13981)		Upload Photo
Campo Bello	1756 Water Street; Miramichi NB	47°01′48″N 65°28′11″W	Miramichi municipality (12089)		Upload Photo
Canada House	1688 Water Street; Miramichi NB	47°01′43″N 65°28′13″W	Miramichi municipality (8036)		Upload Photo
Carroll's Crossing School	468 Carroll's Crossing Road; Upper Miramichi NB	46°31′16″N 66°14′25″W	Upper Miramichi municipality (14064)		Upload Photo
Carvell House	148 Duke Street; Miramichi NB	47°01′47″N 65°28′06″W	Miramichi municipality (5241)		Upload Photo
Carvell House	1815-1817 Water Street; Miramichi NB	47°01′52″N 65°28′08″W	Miramichi municipality (8879)		Upload Photo
Central Bank	156 Wellington Street; Miramichi NB	47°01′43″N 65°28′07″W	Miramichi municipality (9424)		Upload Photo
Chatham Post Office and Customs House	1733 Water Street; Miramichi NB	47°01′48″N 65°28′13″W	Miramichi municipality (9411)		Upload Photo
Chatham Railway Station	4 Johnson Ave; Miramichi NB	47°01′45″N 65°28′18″W	Miramichi municipality (5586)		Upload Photo
Commercial Building	1759 Water Street; Miramichi NB	47°01′49″N 65°28′12″W	Miramichi municipality (8032)		Upload Photo
Connell Farm	47 Nowlanville Road; Miramichi NB	46°56′38″N 65°31′21″W	Miramichi municipality (8940)		Upload Photo
Connell House	1820 Water Street; Miramichi NB	47°01′54″N 65°28′06″W	Miramichi municipality (12083)		Upload Photo
Creaghan Block	122 Newcastle Boulevard; Miramichi NB	47°00′06″N 65°33′53″W	Miramichi municipality (9010)		Upload Photo
Crockers	130 Newcastle Boulevard; Miramichi NB	47°00′08″N 65°33′53″W	Miramichi municipality (8474)		Upload Photo
Daigle House	2 Sutton Road; Miramichi NB	46°58′57″N 65°33′15″W	Miramichi municipality (8911)		Upload Photo
Dr. DeOlloqui Residence	215 Regent Street; Miramichi NB	47°00′12″N 65°34′05″W	Miramichi municipality (12067)		Upload Photo
Doak House	386 Main Street; Doaktown NB	46°33′18″N 66°07′49″W	New Brunswick (5685), Doaktown municipality (9698)		
Doaktown's First School	386 Main Street; Doaktown NB	46°33′18″N 66°07′49″W	Doaktown municipality (9863)		Upload Photo
William Dolan House	84 St. Patrick's Drive; Miramichi NB	46°59′05″N 65°33′14″W	Miramichi municipality (5408)		Upload Photo
Elkin Block	1753 Water Street; Miramichi NB	47°01′48″N 65°28′12″W	Miramichi municipality (12090)		Upload Photo
Elm Park	Henderson Street at Wellington and Duke Streets; Miramichi NB	47°01′50″N 65°28′00″W	Miramichi municipality (8033)		Upload Photo
Enclosure Park	Route 8 Derby NB	46°57′55″N 65°34′56″W	New Brunswick (7766)		
Engine House Buildings	154-156 Mitchell Street; Miramichi NB	46°59′46″N 65°34′01″W	Miramichi municipality (8849)		Upload Photo
England's Hollow	Lower Water Street; Miramichi NB	47°02′29″N 65°27′36″W	Miramichi municipality (12091)		Upload Photo
Escuminac Disaster Monument	Escuminac Point Road; Escuminac NB	47°04′45″N 64°53′14″W	New Brunswick (2651)		
Lighttower; Point Escuminac	Escuminac Point Road; Escuminac NB	47°04′16″N 64°48′33″W	Federal (21057)		
Fairley-Porter Cemetery	8 Harris Lane; Upper Miramichi NB	46°27′18″N 66°25′42″W	Upper Miramichi municipality (14045)		Upload Photo
Farrah's Corner Park	Water Street at Chatham Avenue; Miramichi NB	47°02′03″N 65°27′55″W	Miramichi municipality (8895)		Upload Photo
Flat Iron Building	1698 Water Street; Miramichi NB	47°01′45″N 65°28′15″W	Miramichi municipality (2766)		Upload Photo
Former Lighthouse	Rear Range; Lower Neguac NB	47°15′51″N 65°03′10″W	Federal (13044)		
French Fort Cove	King George Highway; Miramichi NB	47°01′09″N 65°33′04″W	Miramichi municipality (8073)		
Gerrish House	163 Main Street; Miramichi River Valley NB	46°44′24″N 65°49′52″W	Miramichi River Valley municipality (9649)		Upload Photo
Girouard Shipwreck Site	Miramichi Bay; Alnwick NB	47°11′20″N 65°04′51″W	New Brunswick (7997)		Upload Photo
W. R. Gould Residence	196 Wellington Street; Miramichi NB	47°01′49″N 65°27′55″W	Miramichi municipality (5590)		Upload Photo
Governor's Mansion	62 St. Patrick's Drive; Miramichi NB	46°58′54″N 65°33′15″W	Miramichi municipality (8866)		Upload Photo
Griffin House	59 Henderson Street; Miramichi NB	47°01′43″N 65°27′51″W	Miramichi municipality (12082)		Upload Photo
Hayes Building	102 Ellen Street; Miramichi NB	47°00′06″N 65°33′54″W	Miramichi municipality (5270)		Upload Photo
Henderson House	40 Henderson Street; Miramichi NB	47°01′45″N 65°27′57″W	Miramichi municipality (8892)		Upload Photo
C.P. Hickey Residence	24 University Avenue; Miramichi NB	47°01′40″N 65°28′10″W	Miramichi municipality (5461)		Upload Photo
Hickson House	133 Pleasant Street; Miramichi NB	46°59′48″N 65°34′09″W	Miramichi municipality (5350)		Upload Photo
Hocken Block	1781 Water Street; Miramichi NB	47°01′50″N 65°28′11″W	Miramichi municipality (12084)		Upload Photo
Akerley Holmes Residence	245 Main Street; Doaktown NB	46°33′00″N 66°08′42″W	Doaktown municipality (8101)		Upload Photo
Aaron Hovey Jr. Homestead	6901 Route #8; Upper Miramichi NB	46°29′37″N 66°20′08″W	Upper Miramichi municipality (13982)		Upload Photo
John Johnston Residence	1827 Water Street; Miramichi NB	47°01′53″N 65°28′08″W	Miramichi municipality (8867)		Upload Photo
Frank Loggie Residence	4420 Water Street; Miramichi NB	47°04′19″N 65°22′49″W	Miramichi municipality (7271)		Upload Photo
W. G. Loggie Residence	33 Manse Street; Miramichi NB	47°04′09″N 65°23′06″W	Miramichi municipality (8037)		Upload Photo
William J. Loggie Residence	31 Manse Street; Miramichi NB	47°04′09″N 65°23′06″W	Miramichi municipality (8852)		Upload Photo
W. S. Loggie Cultural Centre	222 Wellington Street; Miramichi NB	47°01′54″N 65°27′47″W	Miramichi municipality (5337)		Upload Photo
MacDonald Farm Provincial Historic Site	600 Route 11; Miramichi NB	47°05′50″N 65°21′20″W	New Brunswick (6244)		Upload Photo
William R. MacKinnon Residence	351 Main Street; Doaktown NB	46°33′17″N 66°08′03″W	Doaktown municipality (8100)		Upload Photo
MacMillan Hotel	6180 Route #8; Upper Miramichi NB	46°27′29″N 66°24′45″W	Upper Miramichi municipality (14061)		Upload Photo
Marine (Seamans') Hospital	320 Mckenzie Drive; Miramichi NB	47°01′19″N 65°30′37″W	Federal (11707), New Brunswick (2398), Miramichi municipality (5515)		
W.R. McCloskey Home	6158 Route 8 Upper Miramichi NB	46°27′26″N 66°24′54″W	Upper Miramichi municipality (14044)		Upload Photo
John McDonald House	47 King Street; Miramichi NB	47°01′48″N 65°27′48″W	Miramichi municipality (2689)		Upload Photo
Dr. J.B. McKenzie Home	4202 Water Street; Miramichi NB	47°04′10″N 65°23′36″W	Miramichi municipality (5309)		Upload Photo
Alex McKillop Homestead	87 Percy Kelly Drive; Miramichi NB	47°01′27″N 65°31′16″W	Miramichi municipality (8912)		Upload Photo
Mechanic's Institute	562 King George Highway; Miramichi NB	47°00′10″N 65°34′03″W	Miramichi municipality (5414)		Upload Photo
William Merry House	84 Norton's Lane; Miramichi NB	47°00′25″N 65°33′46″W	Miramichi municipality (8896)		Upload Photo
J. Y. Mersereau Residence	52 Howard Street; Miramichi NB	47°01′44″N 65°27′45″W	Miramichi municipality (5585)		Upload Photo
Methodist Parsonage	3503 Route 625; Upper Miramichi NB	46°27′11″N 66°25′45″W	Upper Miramichi municipality (13925)		Upload Photo
Middle Island	333 Water Street; Miramichi NB	47°03′05″N 65°27′12″W	New Brunswick (5908)		Upload Photo
Middle Island Hospital	34 Manse Street; Miramichi NB	47°04′09″N 65°23′06″W	Miramichi municipality (5571)		Upload Photo
Miller House	125 Pleasant Street; Miramichi NB	46°59′48″N 65°34′11″W	Miramichi municipality (2951)		Upload Photo
Miramichi Fish Hatchery	485 Route 420; South Esk NB	46°57′13″N 65°39′28″W	Federal (10479)		Upload Photo
Miramichi Natural History Museum	149 Wellington St. Miramichi NB	47°01′41″N 65°28′10″W	Miramichi municipality (5311)		Upload Photo
Monument Notre-Dame-de-l'Assomption	Route 126; Nouvelle-Arcadie NB	46°43′58″N 65°25′28″W	New Brunswick (1567)		Upload Photo
Morrison Cove Pump House	1150 Water Street; Miramichi NB	47°00′51″N 65°29′55″W	Miramichi municipality (5560)		Upload Photo
Charles Morrissy Residence	119 Pleasant Street; Miramichi NB	46°59′47″N 65°34′11″W	Miramichi municipality (8087)		Upload Photo
Father Murdoch Residence	51 University Avenue; Miramichi NB	47°01′34″N 65°28′02″W	Miramichi municipality (8878)		Upload Photo
Thyrza Murdock House	4262 Water Street; Miramichi NB	47°04′15″N 65°23′24″W	Miramichi municipality (9412)		Upload Photo
Murray House	Norton's Lane; Miramichi NB	47°00′17″N 65°33′51″W	Miramichi municipality (2659)		Upload Photo
Northumberland County Courthouse	599 King George Highway; Miramichi NB	47°00′16″N 65°34′02″W	Miramichi municipality (5514)		Upload Photo
O'Brien Conservatory and Heating Plant	62 St. Patrick's Drive; Miramichi NB	46°58′54″N 65°33′14″W	Miramichi municipality (5360)		Upload Photo
O'Brien's Store	71 St. Patrick's Drive; Miramichi NB	46°58′55″N 65°33′17″W	Miramichi municipality (5338)		Upload Photo
Mac O'Brien House	62 St. Patrick's Drive; Miramichi NB	46°58′54″N 65°33′15″W	Miramichi municipality (5393)		Upload Photo
Old Baptist Chapel Cemetery	405 Main Street; Doaktown NB	46°33′21″N 66°07′39″W	Doaktown municipality (9699)		
Old Chatham Post Office	1733 Water Street; Miramichi NB	47°01′48″N 65°28′13″W	New Brunswick (5761)		Upload Photo
Old Northumberland County Courthouse	285 Campbell Street; Miramichi NB	47°00′14″N 65°34′13″W	New Brunswick (7887), Miramichi municipality (3106)		Upload Photo
Old St. Michael's Rectory	10 Howard Street; Miramichi NB	47°01′25″N 65°27′49″W	New Brunswick (5879)		Upload Photo
Opera House	159 Pleasant Street; Miramichi NB	46°59′53″N 65°34′07″W	Miramichi municipality (4866)		Upload Photo
Our Lady of Lourdes Roman Catholic Church	271 Main Street; Doaktown NB	46°33′05″N 66°08′33″W	Doaktown municipality (8093)		Upload Photo
Oxbow National Historic Site	Red Bank Indian Reserve NB	46°56′19″N 65°48′41″W	Federal (4299)		Upload Photo
Pallen Building	1704 Water Street; Miramichi NB	47°01′45″N 65°28′15″W	Miramichi municipality (3023)		Upload Photo
Peters House	930 Water Street; Miramichi NB	47°00′47″N 65°30′58″W	New Brunswick (3283), Miramichi municipality (4883)		Upload Photo
Thomas Phelan House	12 Phelan Street; Miramichi NB	47°01′55″N 65°27′37″W	Miramichi municipality (8034)		Upload Photo
Picnic Grounds	11111 Principale Street; Nouvelle-Arcadie NB	46°43′54″N 65°25′35″W	Nouvelle-Arcadie municipality (8410)		Upload Photo
Queen Elizabeth Park	Newcastle Boulevard; Miramichi NB	47°00′05″N 65°33′55″W	Miramichi municipality (8876)		Upload Photo
Gérard Raymond Centre	11101 Principale Street; Nouvelle-Arcadie NB	46°43′52″N 65°25′33″W	Nouvelle-Arcadie municipality (8397)		Upload Photo
William Richards Residence	6166 Route 8 Upper Miramichi NB	46°27′27″N 66°24′52″W	Upper Miramichi municipality (13924)		Upload Photo
Ritchie House	683 King George Highway; Miramichi NB	47°00′27″N 65°33′56″W	Miramichi municipality (4909)		Upload Photo
Otho Robichaud Historic Place	17 Otho Street; Neguac NB	47°14′59″N 65°04′27″W	New Brunswick (10000)		Upload Photo
Alexander Robinson Residence	26 University Avenue; Miramichi NB	47°01′39″N 65°28′09″W	Miramichi municipality (5997)		Upload Photo
Rogersville Presbytery	11111 Principale Street; Nouvelle-Arcadie NB	46°43′55″N 65°25′36″W	Nouvelle-Arcadie municipality (8407)		Upload Photo
William Russell Residence	395 Main Street; Doaktown NB	46°33′21″N 66°07′44″W	Doaktown municipality (9380)		Upload Photo
St. Andrew's Anglican Church	323 Main Street; Doaktown NB	46°33′14″N 66°08′14″W	Doaktown municipality (8098)		
Saint Andrew's Anglican Church	186 Pleasant Street; Miramichi NB	46°59′55″N 65°34′04″W	Miramichi municipality (4073)		Upload Photo
Saint-François-de-Sales Church	11113 Principale Street; Nouvelle-Arcadie NB	46°43′56″N 65°25′37″W	Nouvelle-Arcadie municipality (8406)		Upload Photo
St. James the Greater Anglican Church	6959 Route #8; Upper Miramichi NB	46°29′42″N 66°19′40″W	Upper Miramichi municipality (13927)		
St. James and St. John United Church	556 King George Highway; Miramichi NB	47°00′08″N 65°34′03″W	New Brunswick (7737)		Upload Photo
St. James and St. John United Church and Graveyard	555 King George Highway; Miramichi NB	47°00′10″N 65°34′06″W	Miramichi municipality (8372)		Upload Photo
St. John's and St. Luke's Cemetery	John Street; Miramichi NB	47°01′24″N 65°28′16″W	Miramichi municipality (8076)		Upload Photo
St. Luke's Hall	18 McCurdy Street; Miramichi NB	47°01′43″N 65°28′00″W	Miramichi municipality (8960)		Upload Photo
St. Michael's Basilica	12 Howard Street; Miramichi NB	47°01′33″N 65°27′57″W	Miramichi municipality (2737)		
St. Michael's Convent	14 Howard Street; Miramichi NB	47°01′33″N 65°27′51″W	Miramichi municipality (7697)		Upload Photo
St. Michael's Museum	10 Howard Street; Miramichi NB	47°01′33″N 65°27′58″W	Miramichi municipality (8066)		Upload Photo
St. Patrick's Roman Catholic Church	10 St. Patrick's Drive; Miramichi NB	46°58′35″N 65°33′17″W	Miramichi municipality (8067)		
St. Paul's Anglican Church	750 Water Street; Miramichi NB	47°00′37″N 65°32′00″W	New Brunswick (1979), Miramichi municipality (7272)		Upload Photo
St. Peter's and St. Paul's Church	5 Bartibog Church Road; Oak Point-Bartibog Bridge NB	47°05′26″N 65°20′56″W	New Brunswick (2593)		Upload Photo
Schaffer's Store	136 Main Street; Miramichi River Valley NB	46°44′02″N 65°49′44″W	Miramichi River Valley municipality (9670)		Upload Photo
Stables House	521 King George Highway; Miramichi NB	47°00′03″N 65°34′09″W	Miramichi municipality (12076)		Upload Photo
Stothart House	561 King George Highway; Miramichi NB	47°00′12″N 65°34′04″W	Miramichi municipality (12068)		Upload Photo
Sturgeon's Store	163 Main Street; Miramichi River Valley NB	46°44′24″N 65°49′52″W	Miramichi River Valley municipality (9648)		Upload Photo
Sullivan Homestead	2180 King George Highway; Miramichi NB	47°01′21″N 65°30′44″W	Miramichi municipality (5613)		Upload Photo
Sunnyside	65 Henderson Street; Miramichi NB	47°01′43″N 65°27′49″W	Miramichi municipality (2896)		Upload Photo
Frank Swim Residence	3 Elm Street; Doaktown NB	46°33′38″N 66°07′18″W	Doaktown municipality (8099)		Upload Photo
Trinity Methodist Church	199 Main Street; Doaktown NB	46°32′52″N 66°08′59″W	Doaktown municipality (9696)		Upload Photo
Thomas Vondy House	199 Wellington Street; Miramichi NB	47°01′51″N 65°27′56″W	Miramichi municipality (8894)		Upload Photo
Walls House	168 Main Street; Miramichi River Valley NB	46°44′27″N 65°49′48″W	Miramichi River Valley municipality (9650)		Upload Photo
Water Street Historic District	Water Street and Cunard Street; Miramichi NB	47°01′48″N 65°28′13″W	New Brunswick (7736)		
Wellington Villa	206 Wellington Street; Miramichi NB	47°01′51″N 65°27′53″W	Miramichi municipality (5496)		Upload Photo
Chris Whalen Residence	6192 Route #8; Upper Miramichi NB	46°27′30″N 66°24′41″W	Upper Miramichi municipality (14065)		Upload Photo
John T. Williston House	1696 Water Street; Miramichi NB	47°01′45″N 65°28′15″W	New Brunswick (5730), Miramichi municipality (5517)		Upload Photo
Wilson's Point	Route 8 Derby NB	46°57′55″N 65°34′58″W	New Brunswick (8294)		
Postmaster Wilson's Residence	217 Wellington Street; Miramichi NB	47°01′55″N 65°27′50″W	Miramichi municipality (8913)		Upload Photo
John Wyse House	77 Shore Drive; Miramichi NB	47°01′23″N 65°30′18″W	Miramichi municipality (5548)		Upload Photo
Yorston House	2059 King George Highway; Miramichi NB	47°01′22″N 65°31′23″W	Miramichi municipality (12069)		Upload Photo

== See also ==
- List of historic places in New Brunswick
- List of National Historic Sites of Canada in New Brunswick
