= Derby Parish, New Brunswick =

Derby
- Parish
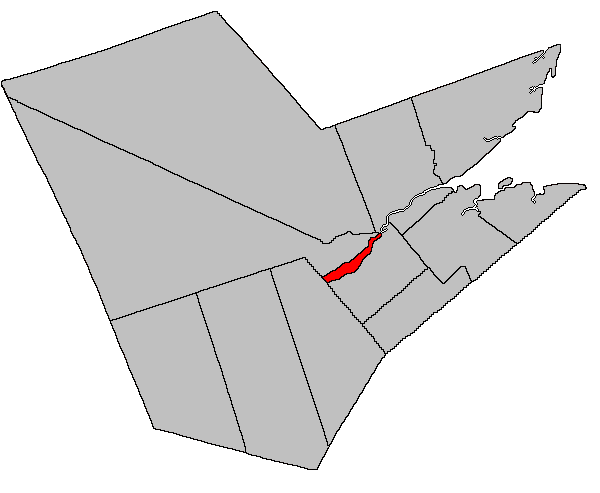
- Location within Northumberland County, New Brunswick
- Coordinates: 46.8875°N 65.655°W
- Country: Canada
- Province: New Brunswick
- County: Northumberland
- Erected: 1859

Area
  - Land: 61.00 km^{2} (23.55 sq mi)

Population (2021)
  - Total: 938
  - Density: 15.4/km^{2} (40/sq mi)
  - Change 2016-2021: ▼3.9%
  - Dwellings: 450
- Time zone: UTC-4 (AST)
  - Summer (DST): UTC-3 (ADT)

Derby is a geographic parish in Northumberland County, New Brunswick, Canada. (Note: The Territorial Division Act divides the province into 152 parishes, the cities of Saint John and Fredericton, and one town of Grand Falls. The Interpretation Act clarifies that parishes include any local government within their borders.)

For governance, it is entirely part of the incorporated rural community of Miramichi River Valley, which is a member of the Greater Miramichi Regional Service Commission.

Prior to the 2023 governance reform, the parish was divided between local service districts of Renous-Quarryville and the parish of Derby.

== Origin of name ==
The parish was named in honour of the Earl of Derby, Prime Minister of the United Kingdom at the time of its erection. William F. Ganong notes that local legend states the parish took its name from horse races held in the area.

== History ==
Derby was erected in 1859 from all of Nelson Parish north of the Southwest Miramichi River plus Beaubears Island.

== Boundaries ==
Derby Parish is bounded:

- on the north by a line beginning at a point on the Blackville Parish line about 1.8 kilometres northwesterly of Route 8 on a line running north 22º west (Note: By the magnet of 1814, when declination in the area was between 16º and 17º west of north. The Territorial Division Act clause referring to magnetic direction bearings was omitted in the 1952 and 1973 Revised Statutes.) from the mouth of the Renous River, then running northeasterly along the prolongation of the rear line of the Elm Tree Tract granted to William Davidson, then along the Elm Tree Tract, which is joined by Route 8 east of Route 415, and along a survey line to the westernmost corner of a grant to Roland Crocker on the south side of Crocker Lake and the north side of Route 8, then along the Crocker grant to its northernmost corner, then southeasterly to the north line of a grant to Timothy Crocker, then northeasterly to the southernmost corner of a grant to William A. Bryenton, then northwesterly, northeasterly, and southeasterly around the Bryenton grant to join the rear line of grants on the Southwest Miramichi River, then northeasterly along the rear line of river grants to Williamstown Road, then northwesterly and northeasterly to include a grant to Jared Betts before rejoining the river grants, then along the river grants past the Old Creamer Road to the northernmost point of a grant to William Davidson, then southeasterly to the Old Creamer Road, then northeasterly along the road to the northeastern line of a grant to Jonathan Sherwood, then southeasterly to a point about 700 metres slightly east of south of the junction of Route 420 and Creamer Road, then easterly to a point on the southern bank of the Northwest Miramichi River about 700 metres east of Enclosure Road, the northwestern corner of a grant to St. James Church of Scotland at Wilsons Point, then into the Northwest Miramichi and downstream past the tip Beaubears Island;
- on the south by the Southwest Miramichi River, running upstream from Beaubears Island to the mouth of the Renous;
- on the west by the Blackville Parish line, running from the mouth of the Renous northwesterly to the starting point;
- including Beaubears Island.

=== Evolution of boundaries ===
The original northern boundary of Derby was a straight line running south 68º west This put parts of modern Southesk in Derby and parts of Derby in Southesk.

In 1920 the boundary with Southesk Parish was changed to run along lot lines; these lines were sometimes grant lines and sometimes property lines. Clarifications to the boundary of Southesk in 1953 and 1954 affected Derby, producing the modern boundary.

== Communities ==
Communities at least partly within the parish. italics indicate a name no longer in official use

- Bryenton
- Derby
- Derby Junction
- Elmtree
- Lower Derby
- Manderville
- Millerton
- Quarryville
- Upper Derby

== Bodies of water ==
Bodies of water (Note: Not including brooks, ponds or coves.) at least partly within the parish.

- Northwest Miramichi River
- Southwest Miramichi River

== Islands ==
Islands at least partly within the parish.

- Beaubears Island

== Conservation areas ==
Parks, historic sites, and other noteworthy places at least partly within the parish.

- Beaubears Island Shipbuilding National Historic Site of Canada
- Boishébert National Historic Site of Canada
- Wilson's Point Wildlife Refuge

== Demographics ==
=== Population ===
Population trend

Census	Population	Change (%)
2016	976	▼2.2%
2011	998	▼6.6%
2006	1,068	▼4.8%
2001	1,122	▼6.3%
1996	1,197	▼2.0%
1991	1,221	N/A

=== Language ===
Mother tongue (2016)

Language	Population	Pct (%)
English only	920	96.4%
French only	25	2.6%
Other languages	10	1.0%
Both English and French	0	0%

== Access routes ==
Highways and numbered routes that run through the parish, including external routes that start or finish at the parish limits:

- Highways
  - Route 8
- Principal Routes
  - Route 108
- Secondary Routes:
  - Route 415
- External Routes:
  - None

== See also ==
- List of parishes in New Brunswick
