= Blackville Parish, New Brunswick =

Blackville
- Parish
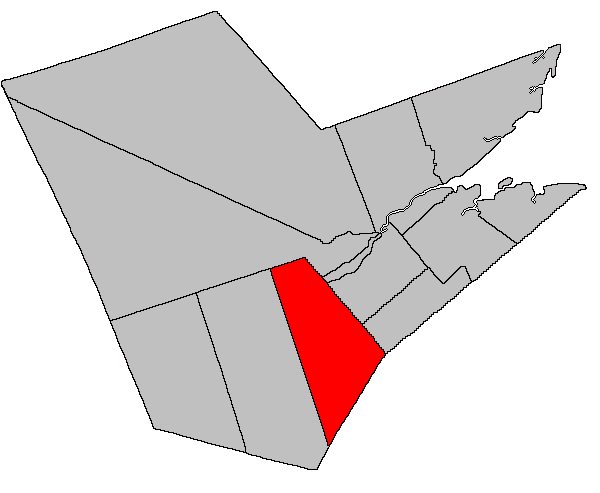
- Location within Northumberland County, New Brunswick
- Coordinates: 46°36′N 65°44′W
- Country: Canada
- Province: New Brunswick
- County: Northumberland
- Erected: 1830

Area
  - Land: 823.93 km^{2} (318.12 sq mi)

Population (2021)
  - Total: 1,996
  - Density: 2.4/km^{2} (6.2/sq mi)
  - Change 2016-2021: ▼1.6%
  - Dwellings: 970
- Time zone: UTC-4 (AST)
  - Summer (DST): UTC-3 (ADT)
- Figures do not include portion within the village of Blackville

Blackville is a geographic parish in Northumberland County, New Brunswick, Canada. (Note: The Territorial Division Act divides the province into 152 parishes, the cities of Saint John and Fredericton, and one town of Grand Falls. The Interpretation Act clarifies that parishes include any local government within their borders.)

For governance purposes it is divided between the incorporated rural community of Miramichi River Valley and the Greater Miramichi rural district, both of which are members of the Greater Miramichi Regional Service Commission.

Prior to the 2023 governance reform, the parish was divided between the village of Blackville and the local service districts of Renous-Quarryville and the parish of Blackville.

== Origin of name ==
The parish was named in honour of William Black, Administrator of the province at the time of its erection due to the absence of Lieutenant-Governor Howard Douglas. Neighbouring Blissfield Parish was named in honour of John Murray Bliss, who was Administrator of the province prior to Douglas's arrival.

== History ==
Blackville was erected in 1830 by the three-way split of Ludlow Parish, Blackville being the easternmost and Blissfield in the middle.

== Boundaries ==
Blackville Parish is bounded:

- on the north by a line beginning at a point on the York County line near McConnell Brook, then running north 72º east by an astronomic bearing to a point 537 chains (10.8 kilometres) from the Canadian National Railway line through Quarryville on a line running north 22º west (Note: By the magnet of 1814, when declination in the area was between 16º and 17º west of north. The Territorial Division Act clause referring to magnetic direction bearings was omitted in the 1952 and 1973 Revised Statutes.) from the mouth of the Renous River;
- on the east by a line beginning 537 chains northwesterly of the above railway and running south 22º east through the mouth of Renous River to the Kent County line;
- on the south by the Kent County line;
- on the west by a line beginning at a point on the Kent County line about 3.1 kilometres south of Meadow Brook Lake and running north through the mouth of Donnelly Brook, which is on the southern bank of the Southwest Miramichi River west of Upper Blackville Bridge, to the starting point.

=== Evolution of boundaries ===
When Blackville was erected it extended to the Westmorland County line, including much of Harcourt and Huskisson Parishes. The original boundaries can be seen by prolonging the existing eastern and western boundaries of Blackville.

In 1845 the Kent County line was changed to run southwesterly instead of southeasterly, now meeting the line between Queens and Sunbury Counties. Most of Blackville's territory was transferred to Harcourt and Huskisson Parishes. The parish's boundaries were essentially the same as they are today.

Changes in the wording of the boundary with Northesk Parish and later Southesk Parish in 1850, 1877, and 1954 made little if any difference in the parish line.

== Communities ==
Communities at least partly within the parish. bold indicates an incorporated municipality

- Arbeau Settlement
- Barnettville
- Bartholomew
- **Blackville**
  - Breadalbane
  - Coughlan
  - Underhill
- Grainfield
- Gray Rapids
- Keenan Siding
- Lockstead
- McCann
- North Renous
- Pineville
- Renous
- Smiths Crossing
- Shinnickburn
- The Lots
- Upper Blackville
- Upper Blackville Bridge
- White Rapids

== Bodies of water ==
Bodies of water (Note: Not including brooks, ponds or coves.) at least partly within the parish.

- Bartholomew River
- Cains River
- Dungarvon River
- Renous River
- Sabbies River
- Southwest Miramichi River
- Meadow Brook Lake
- Smiths Lake
- South Lake

== Islands ==
Islands at least partly within the parish.

- Doctors Island
- Morehouse Island
- Washburns Island

== Other notable places ==
Parks, historic sites, and other noteworthy places at least partly within the parish.

- Dungarvon Whooper Spring Woodlot Protected Natural Area
- Dunphy Airstrip
- Shinnickburn Protected Natural Area

== Demographics ==
Parish population total does not include former incorporated village of Blackville. Revised census figures based on the 2023 local governance reforms have not been released.

=== Population ===
**Population trend**

Census	Population	Change (%)
2016	2,028	▼8.4%
2011	2,215	▼5.6%
2006	2,347	▼3.1%
2001	2,421	▼7.6%
1996	2,620	▲6.0%
1991	2,471	N/A

=== Language ===
**Mother tongue (2016)**

Language	Population	Pct (%)
English only	1,840	97.1%
French only	25	1.3%
Other languages	25	1.3%
Both English and French	5	0.3%

== See also ==
- List of parishes in New Brunswick
