= North & South Esk Regional High School =

Location
- 40 North West Rd. Sunny Corner, New Brunswick, E1E 1J4; Canada; 46.9492°N 65.8167°W

Information
- School type: High School
- Founded: 1952
- School district: Anglophone North School District
- Superintendent: Dean Mutch
- School number: 0825
- Principal: Angela Murphy
- Teaching staff: 23.0
- Grades: 7–12
- Enrollment: 185 (2022-2023)
- Language: English
- Colours: Maroon; White
- Team name: Cobras
- Website: nser.nbed.nb.ca

North & South Esk Regional High School, commonly abbreviated to N.S.E.R., is one of five public, English language high schools in the Miramichi Area. It also functions as a middle school. It is located in Sunny Corner, New Brunswick. It serves principally residents from Sunny Corner, Red Bank, Sevogle, Sillikers, and Cassilis. The school serves grades 7 to 12. Graduating class sizes varied from 5 students in the first year (1952) to 70+ students in the 1970s. It presently has around 190 pupils.

== Clubs ==
There are two major clubs in this school that have existed consistently through the lifespan of the school. First is the Student Council, which is elected by grades 7-11 at the end of the school year. They serve the next school year after the Summer break. The Student Council organizes Pep Rallies, Theme Weeks and events that are held throughout the school year.

The second major club is the Rotary Interact Club, which hosts events both inside and outside of school hours for purposes of volunteering and raising money, which is donated at the end of the school year to charities decided by the clubs President. The Rotary Club has several traditional events that occur often, such as the "Trick or Eat" event, which occurs every Halloween, and operates as a Food Drive, where students gather food donations from nearby donors and donate them to nearby Food Banks. Other events include movie nights, bottle drives, and other fundraisers.

== Notable events ==
In 2012 after being principal for less than a year Kirk Matheson was arrested after pleading guilty to sex crimes involving children. Kirk, 37, was the principal and volleyball coach at North and South Esk Regional when he posed as a 19-year-old woman (Jillian) on Facebook and enticed two boys to send him nude photos and video of themselves.

On February 8, 2024, the Rotary Interact Club of N.S.E.R. hosted the first Miramichi River Fan Fest, which was a Comic Convention that aimed to assist in raising money for the club. The convention was a wild success with many vendors, both local and from across the Maritimes, many volunteers, from the Rotary club and other locals, and many attendees. Overall, the event raised nearly $4000 for the Rotary Club, and was a massive success. Plans exist to hold another Miramichi River Fan Fest some time in the near future.
