= Colonels Mountain (New Brunswick) =

Mountain in New Brunswick, Canada

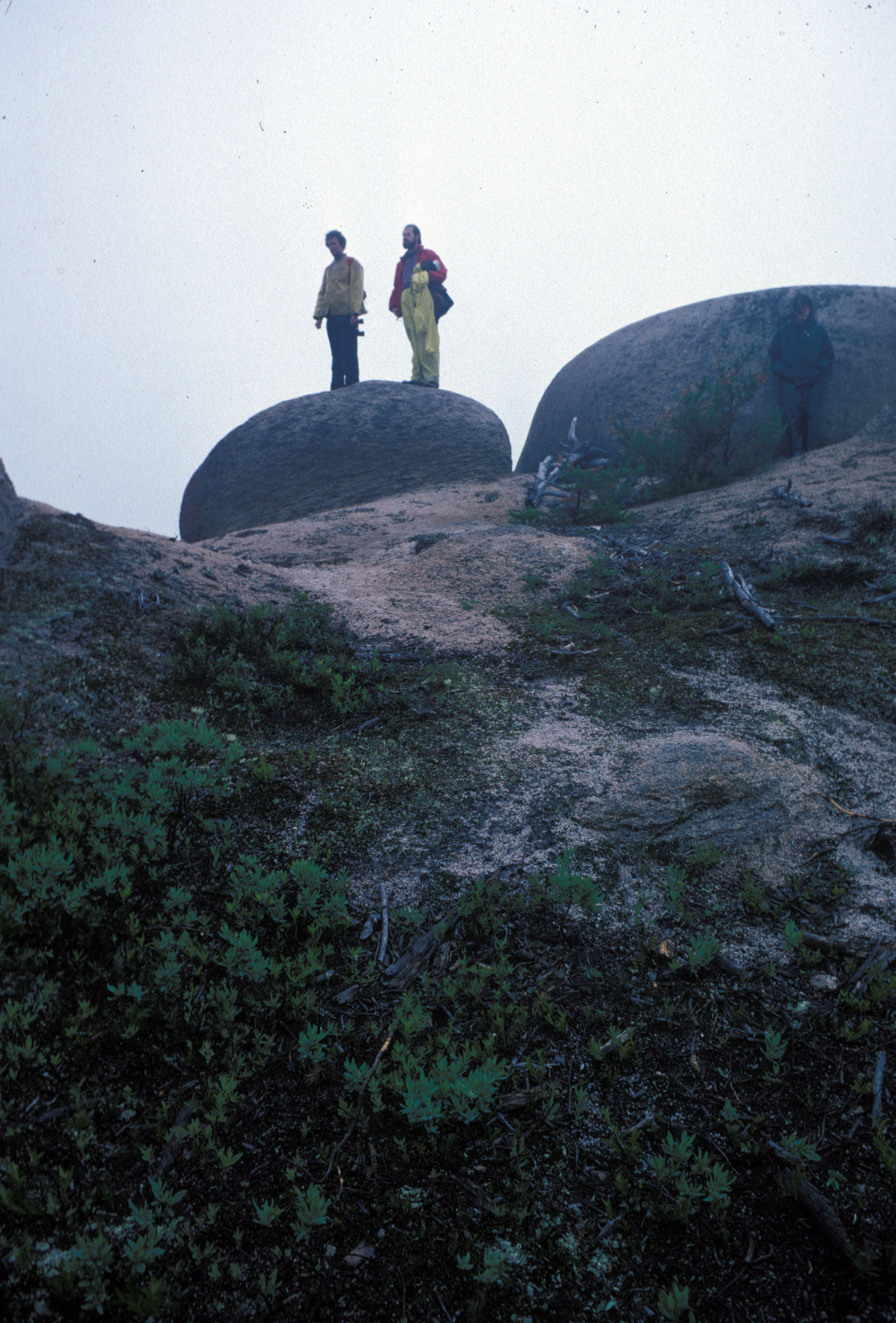
- Tors on Colonels Mountain

Highest point
- Elevation: 600 m (2,000 ft)
- Coordinates: 47°12′13″N 66°23′50″W

Geography
- Location: Northumberland County, New Brunswick
- Parent range: Appalachian Mountains
- Topo map: NTS 21O1 Big Bald Mountain

Climbing
- Easiest route: Hike

Colonels Mountain is a mountain in the Canadian province of New Brunswick. It lies adjacent to Big Bald Mountain, at the headwaters of the Northwest Miramichi River and the Sevogle River.

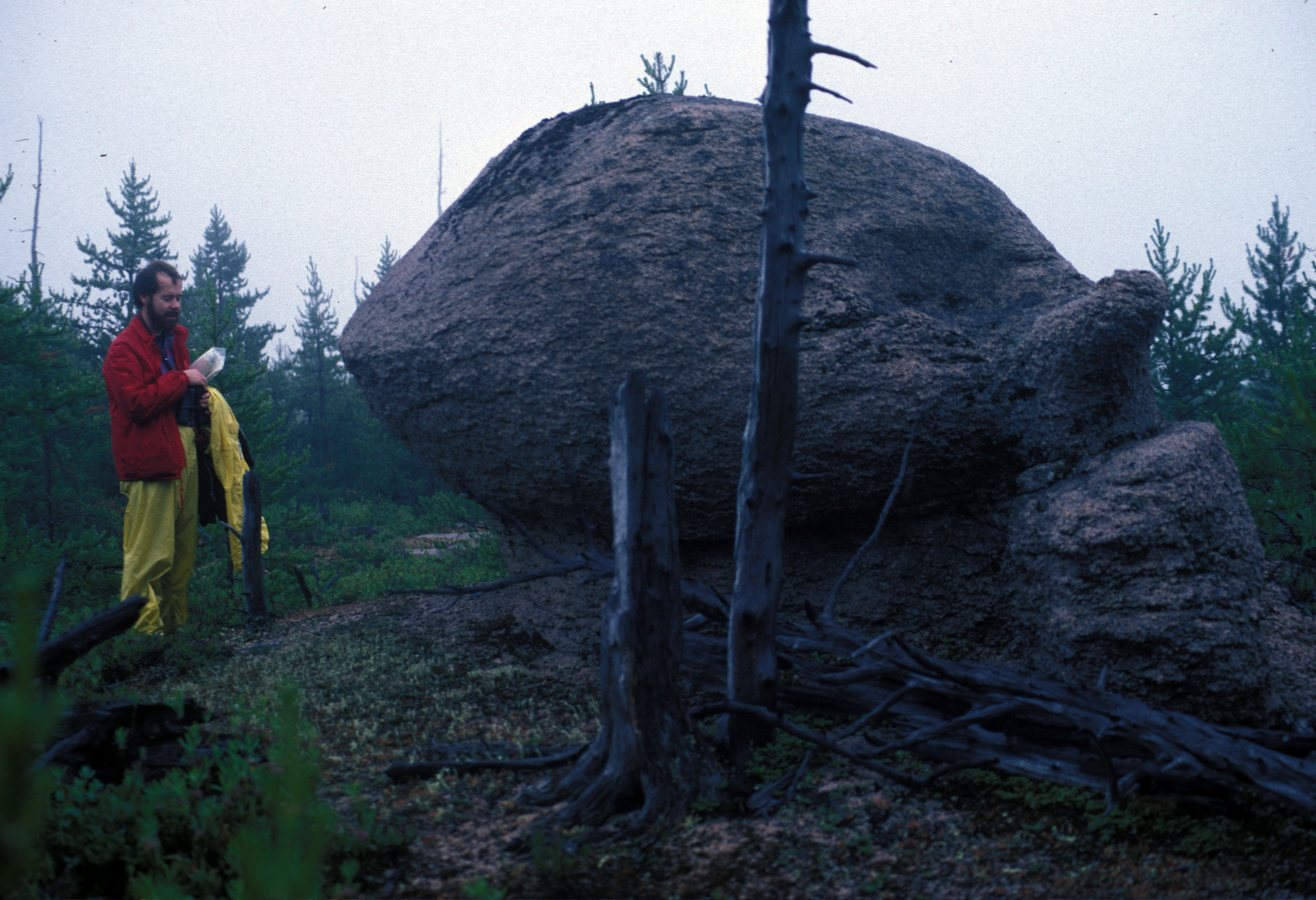
Tor on Colonels Mountain

The mountain top has been weathered to generate a series of mushroom-shaped granitic tors. Because the weathering process which forms tors is normally very slow, these features have been interpreted as indicating that part of northern New Brunswick escaped the last, Wisconsinan glaciation. It has been suggested, however, that the mountain lay near the centre of the ice cap; these erosional remnants thus escaped the scouring action of the glaciers.
