= Blackville =

Blackville can refer to:

- Blackville, New Brunswick, Canada
- Blackville Parish, New Brunswick, Canada
- Blackville, South Carolina, USA
- Upper Blackville, New Brunswick, Canada
- Blackville, New South Wales, Australia

== See also ==
- Blakeville
