= Renous =

Renous may refer to:

- Renous, New Brunswick, a rural community in New Brunswick
  - The Atlantic Institution, a prison located there, sometimes referred to as "Renous Prison" and "Renous Penitentiary"
- Renous River, a river in New Brunswick
