= New Brunswick Route 420 =

Highway in New Brunswick, Canada

Coordinates: 46.939715°N 65.886726°W

Route 420

Route information
- Maintained by New Brunswick Department of Transportation

Major junctions
- West end: Route 108 east of McGraw Brook
- East end: Route 8 / Route 108 in Derby Junction

Location
- Country: Canada
- Province: New Brunswick
- Major cities: Harris Brook Settlement, Matthews, Lyttleton, Gibbons Island, Harris Brook Settlement, Sillikers, Red Bank, Cassilis, Harris Brook Settlement, South Esk, Harris Brook Settlement,

Highway system
- Provincial highways in New Brunswick; Former routes
← Route 415	→ Route 425

Route 420 is a 35-kilometre (22 mi) long mostly east–west secondary highway in the northwest portion of New Brunswick, Canada.

The route's eastern terminus starts on Route 108 between the community of McGraw Brook and Flat Landing. The road travels north before turning north-easterly following the South Bank of the Little Southwest Miramichi River through the mostly treed area to the community of Harris Brook Settlement. The road continues north east to the community of Matthews then passing by the community of Lyttleton.

The road continues north east passing Gibbons Island to the community of Sillikers. Continuing the road passes Johnsons Island, Mitchells Island, Indian Island then Little Indian Island before coming to the intersection of Route 425 near Sunny Corner. The road continues to follow the Northwest Miramichi River through the Metepenagiag Mi'kmaq Nation through the Reserve of Red Bank, passing the northern exit of Route 415, passing the community of Cassilis, passing Shillelagh Cove and the community of South Esk before ending at the community of Derby Junction near Miramichi at the intersection at Route 8 and Route 108.

== Intersecting routes ==
- Route 8
- Route 108
- Route 425
- Route 415
