= Tuadook River =

River in New Brunswick, Canada

Location of Tuadook River in New Brunswick

Tuadook River is a Canadian river in Northumberland County, New Brunswick. The river drains northeastward from Holmes Lake and Tuadook Lake into the Little Southwest Miramichi River. The name is derived from the original Mi'kmaq name for the Little Southwest Miramichi River

== See also ==
- List of rivers of New Brunswick
