= Lockstead =

Lockstead may refer to:

== People ==
- Don Lockstead (1931–1998), Canadian politician

== Places ==
- Lockstead, New Brunswick, Canadian community
