= Big Bald Mountain (New Brunswick) =

Mountain in New Brunswick, Canada

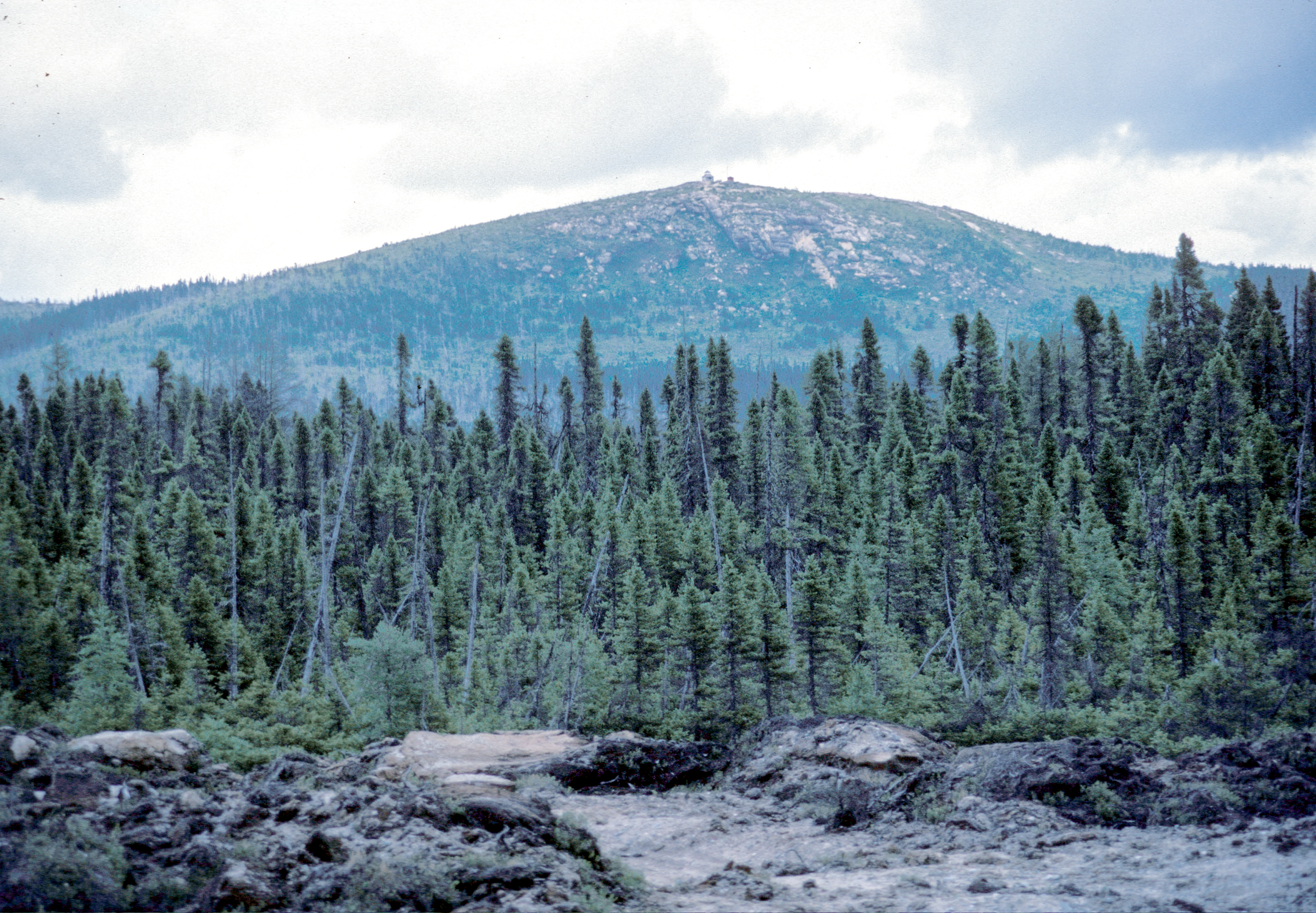

Highest point
- Elevation: 672 m (2,205 ft)
- Coordinates: 47°11′42″N 66°25′22″W

Geography
- Location: Northumberland, New Brunswick
- Parent range: Appalachian Mountains
- Topo map: NTS 21O1 Big Bald Mountain

Climbing
- Easiest route: hike

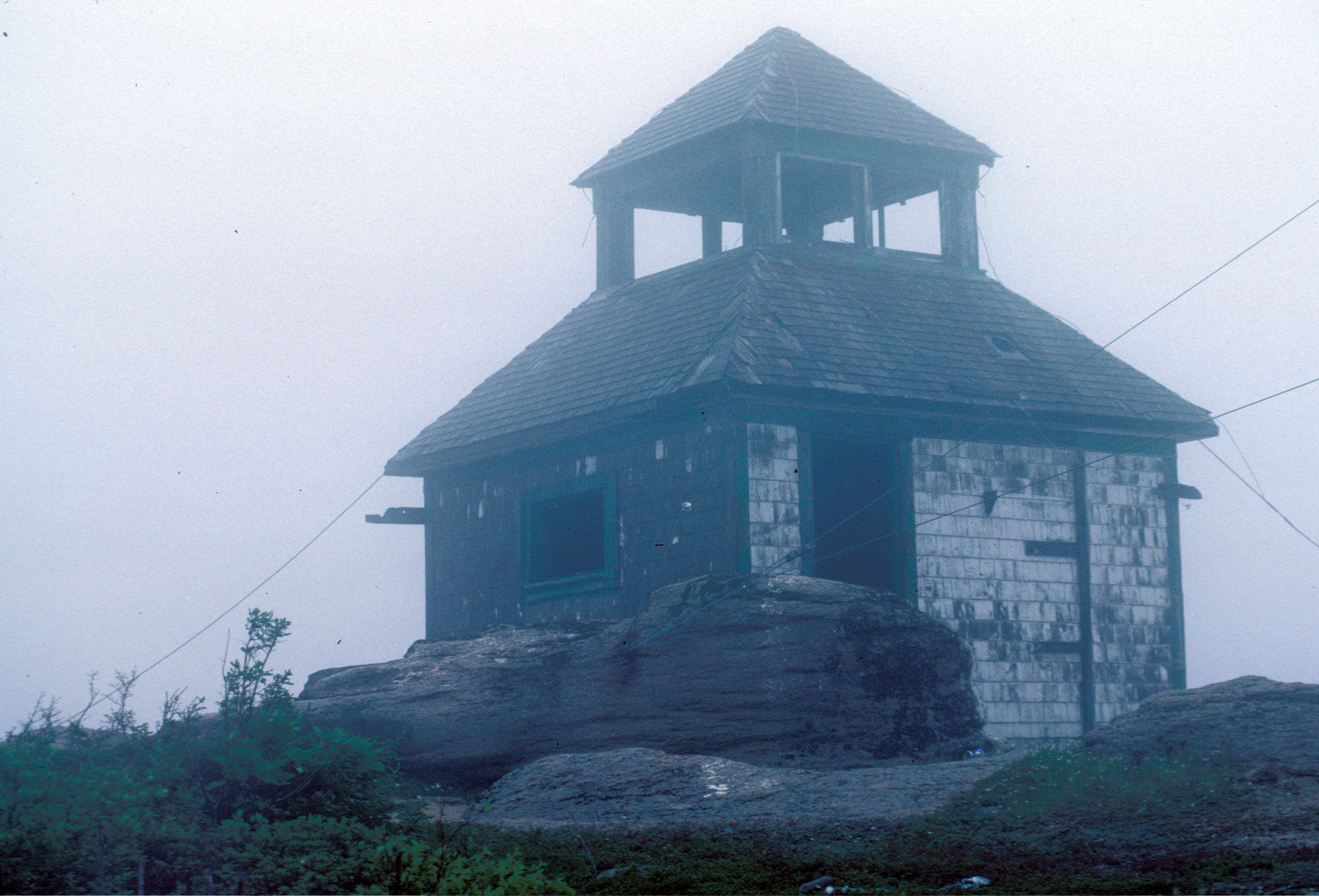
Abandoned fire-spotting hut on Big Bald Mountain (IR Walker 1986)

Big Bald Mountain, also known as Bald Mountain, is a prominent peak in the Canadian province of New Brunswick. It lies adjacent to Colonels Mountain, east of the Christmas Mountains, and near the headwaters of the Northwest Miramichi River, the Sevogle River, and the South Branch Nepisiguit River. It is a well-known feature, in part because of its height, but especially because of its bald summit (hence the name).

Before aerial surveillance was extensively used, a hut was maintained on the summit for fire-spotting in the remote north-central part of the province. A very similar hut was maintained on Mount Carleton, the province's highest peak. Triangulation among these huts and other fire towers allowed the locations of wildfires to be determined quickly and easily.
