= Cassilis =

Cassilis or Cassillis may refer to:

- Cassillis House, a tower house near Maybole, Ayrshire, Scotland
- Cassilis, New Brunswick, a rural community in Northumberland County, New Brunswick, Canada
- Cassilis, New South Wales, a town in central-western New South Wales, Australia
- Cassilis, Victoria, a town in Gippsland, Victoria, Australia

== See also ==
- Cassils (disambiguation)
- Earl of Cassilis, a title in the Peerage of Scotland
