= New Brunswick Route 415 =

Highway in New Brunswick, Canada

Coordinates: 46.893751°N 65.814285°W

Route 415

Route information
- Maintained by New Brunswick Department of Transportation

Major junctions
- North end: Route 420 in Red Bank
- Route 8 near Renous-Quarryville
- South end: Route 108 in Renous-Quarryville

Location
- Country: Canada
- Province: New Brunswick
- Major cities: Warwick Settlement,

Highway system
- Provincial highways in New Brunswick; Former routes
← Route 395	→ Route 420

Route 415 is a 12-kilometre (7.5 mi) long mostly North–South secondary highway in the northwest portion of New Brunswick, Canada.

The route's North-Eastern terminus starts at an intersection on Route 420 in the community of Red Bank. The road travels south through the mostly treed area to the community of Warwick Settlement. The road continues south crossing the Route 8 before ending in the community of Renous-Quarryville.

== Intersecting routes ==
- Route 8
