= White Rapids =

White Rapids may refer to:

Places

- White Rapids, New Brunswick, a settlement in Canada
- Valkeakoski (Finnish: White Rapids), a town and municipality in Finland.

Other

- Ingalls, White Rapids and Northern Railway, see List of Michigan railroads
- White Rapids Hydroelectric dam, a dam on the Menominee River

== See also ==
- Whitewater
- Rapids
