= Christmas Mountains =

Canadian mountain range

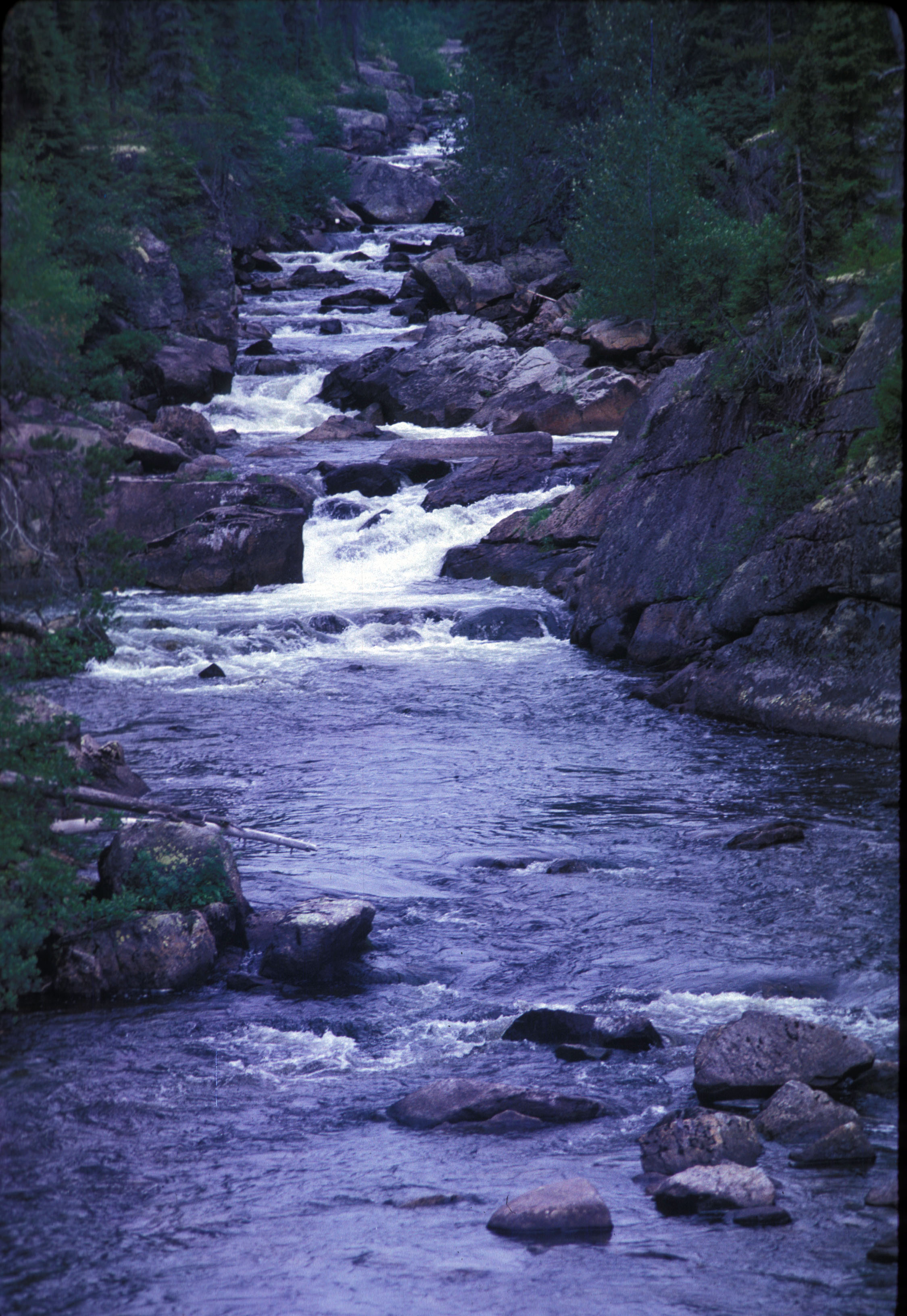
- North Pole Stream, a tributary to the Little Southwest Miramichi River in north-central New Brunswick, Canada

Highest point
- Elevation: 750 m (2,460 ft)
- Coordinates: 47°10′N 66°40′W

Geography
- Location within New Brunswick
- Location: Northumberland County, New Brunswick
- Parent range: Appalachian Mountains
- Topo map: NTS 21O2 Serpentine Lake

Climbing
- Easiest route: Hike

The Christmas Mountains are a series of rounded peaks in northern New Brunswick, Canada, at the headwaters of North Pole Stream and the Little Southwest Miramichi River, west of Big Bald Mountain, and south of Mount Carleton. The mountains, in part, separate the Miramichi River watershed from the watersheds of the Serpentine River and the Nepisiguit River.

In 1964, Arthur F. Wightman named the range and peaks after noting that the previously unnamed peaks lay near the source of North Pole Stream, hence this sub-range of the Appalachians has been named after the Christian holiday of Christmas.

The ten peaks are:

- North Pole Mountain (690 m (2,264 ft)) (47°11′39″N 66°40′00″W)
- Mount St. Nicholas (625 m (2,051 ft)) (47°10′9″N 66°40′24″W)
- Mount Dasher (750 m (2,461 ft)) (47°11′48″N 66°44′14″W)
- Mount Dancer (670 m (2,198 ft)) (47°09′53″N 66°42′51″W)
- Mount Prancer (580 m (1,903 ft)) (47°8′00″N 66°40′56″W)
- Mount Vixen (650 m (2,133 ft)) (47°8′15″N 66°43′28″W)
- Mount Comet (550 m (1,804 ft)) (47°7′00″N 66°38′36″W)
- Mount Cupid (530 m (1,739 ft)) (47°9′01″N 66°36′36″W)
- Mount Donder (730 m (2,395 ft)) (47°10′47″N 66°36′10″W)
- Mount Blitzen (670 m (2,198 ft)) (47°10′50″N 66°37′50″W)

The eight latter names commemorate Santa Claus's reindeer as named in the 1823 poem "A Visit from St. Nicholas" by Clement Clarke Moore. The poem reads in part:

With a little old driver so lively and quick,

I knew in a moment it must be St. Nick.
More rapid than eagles, his coursers they came,
And he whistled and shouted and called them by name:

Now Dasher! Now Dancer! Now, Prancer and Vixen!
On, Comet! On, Cupid! On, Donder and Blitzen!
To the top of the porch! To the top of the wall!

Now dash away! Dash away! Dash away all!

Although a ninth reindeer was later added to Santa Claus' team in the popular 1949 Christmas song "Rudolph the Red-Nosed Reindeer", no peak was named for Rudolph.

== Clearcutting controversy ==
Until the mid-1990s, the Christmas Mountains remained untouched by industrial forestry operations. As Crown land, the New Brunswick Department of Natural Resources administered the property as part of a vast swath of forest across the north-central part of the province. With few roads leading into the area, the Christmas Mountains maintained an old growth Acadian forest that was unique to northeastern North America.

New Brunswick Department of Natural Resources leased the property comprising the Christmas Mountains to a U.S. owned pulp and paper company Repap (the name is the word "paper" reversed). Repap began building logging roads into the region around 1995 and began an aggressive clearcutting operation over the next several years, despite numerous vocal and radical protests by New Brunswick-based environmentalists who feared the consequences of habitat destruction and the loss of the old-growth forest. Despite the efforts, the Christmas Mountains old growth forest was largely logged by the end of the decade.
