= Cassils =

Cassils is a Scottish surname, and may refer to:

- Cassils (artist), Canadian artist and bodybuilder
- Cassils, Alberta, a hamlet in Canada

== See also ==
- Cassilis (disambiguation)
- Earl of Cassilis, pronounced "Cassils", Dumbarton Castle
