= Big Sevogle River =

River in New Brunswick, Canada

The Big Sevogle River is a Canadian river in central New Brunswick. It consists of two branches, the North Sevogle and South Sevogle Rivers. Below the confluence of these rivers at the Square Forks, the river is properly referred to as the Big Sevogle River. This name serves to distinguish it from the "Little Sevogle River", a much smaller tributary to the Northwest Miramichi River.

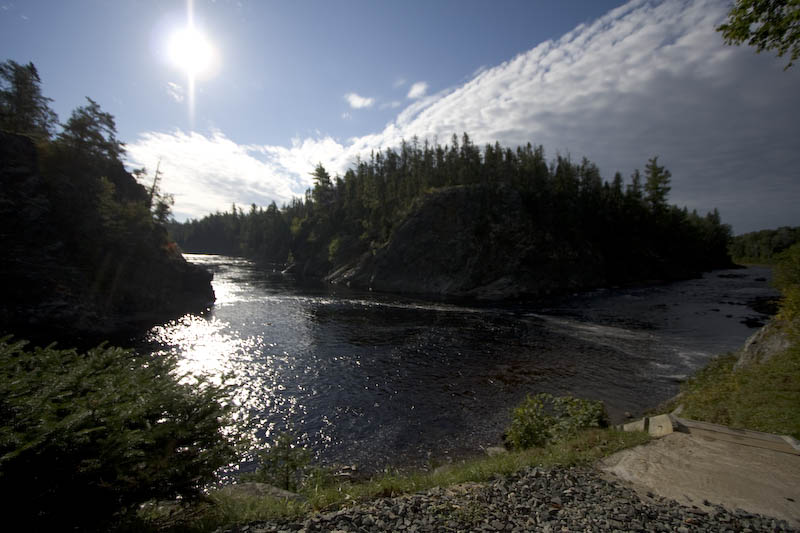
Head of the Big Sevogle River at Square Forks

The Mi'kmaq may have referred to the river as Sewokulook, "river of many cliffs", or as Elmunakuncheech, meaning "little beaver hole".

The river rises in the Big Bald Mountain area of the Miramichi Highlands, a region in north-central Northumberland County. The river flows southeast through heavy forests before joining the Northwest Miramichi River at Big Hole Tract at Indian Reserve 8, several kilometres northeast of Red Bank.

The Big Sevogle River is noted for its Atlantic Salmon fishing, and one of the major salmon pools near the mouth of the river was leased and controlled for many years by the Colgate family of the United States.

The annual Atlantic Salmon Run occurs from mid-June through late September. Angling for Atlantic Salmon in the river is restricted to fly fishing only and all large salmon must be released.

== Tributaries ==
- Mullin Stream
- Clearwater Stream
- Sheephouse Brook

== See also ==
- List of rivers of New Brunswick
