= Arbeau Settlement, New Brunswick =

Community in New Brunswick, Canada

Coordinates: 46.636°N 65.864°W

Location of Arbeau Settlement in New Brunswick

Arbeau Settlement is a rural community in the upper reaches of the Miramichi Valley in Northumberland County, New Brunswick. It is named after the Arbeau family, many of whom have lived in the area over the years.

== See also ==
- List of communities in New Brunswick
