= Gray Rapids, New Brunswick =

Community in New Brunswick, Canada

Coordinates: 46.777°N 65.753°W

Location of Gray Rapids in New Brunswick

Gray Rapids is a rural community in the Canadian province of New Brunswick, located in Northumberland County.

== See also ==
- List of communities in New Brunswick
