= Joe Mike Augustine =

Joseph Michael Augustine

Leader and historian of the Metepenagiag Mi'kmaq Nation leader

Personal details
- Born: March 16, 1911 Big Cove
- Died: January 14, 1995 (aged 83)
- Relations: Grandfather of Noah Augustine

Joseph Michael Augustine (March 16, 1911 – January 14, 1995) was a native leader and historian of the Metepenagiag Mi'kmaq Nation. He discovered the Augustine Mound, which bears his name.

Born at Big Cove, Joseph Augustine moved as a youth to the Red Bank Reserve (now known as Metepenagiag), and learned the Mi'kmaq language and many traditions from his father. He was a logger, trapper, basket maker, and ultimately a leader in the Metepenagiag community. He was elected as Chief (1952–54 and 1956–58) and Band Councillor (1960–64 and 1966–72).

He later gained prominence for his discovery of the Augustine Mound and Oxbow National Historic Sites, a trove of artifacts dating back more than 3000 years. For his discovery he was awarded the 1988 Minister's Award for Heritage.

Joseph Augustine was the grandfather of Noah Augustine.
