= Noah Augustine =

Noah Christian Augustine

Chief of Metepenagiag Mi'kmaq Nation leader

Personal details
- Born: February 10, 1971
- Died: November 13, 2010 (aged 39)
- Cause of death: Car accident
- Domestic partner: Micheline Léger (2008-2010)
- Relations: Grandson of Joseph Augustine
- Children: Zackary Simonson, Chelsea Karasek, Corinne Léger Augustine and Adèle Léger LeBlanc
- Known for: Founding member of the Native Loggers Business Association

Noah Christian Augustine (February 10, 1971 – November 13, 2010) was a former Chief of Metepenagiag Mi'kmaq Nation and prominent native activist in Canada, a founding member of the Native Loggers Business Association, president of the Union of New Brunswick Indians, co-chairman of the Atlantic Policy Congress of First Nations Chiefs and co-founder of the New Brunswick First Nations and Business Liaison Group.

Augustine was a grandson of Joseph Augustine and he first gained national prominence by leading the fight for aboriginal logging rights. He was a controversial figure, once charged with murder but found not guilty in the September 19, 1998 death of Bruce Barnaby, a resident of Eel Ground First Nation.

In 2004, Augustine was elected as Chief of Metepenagiag, serving until 2010 when he lost reelection to Freeman Ward. Later in 2010, Augustine died when his truck left the road, striking a tree. Royal Canadian Mounted Police investigators suggested that speed and alcohol contributed to the accident.
