= Holmes Lake (New Brunswick) =

- Location of Holmes Lake in New Brunswick
- Location: Southesk Parish, Northumberland County, New Brunswick
- Coordinates: 46°56′57″N 66°36′37″W
- Type: lake
- Primary outflows: Little Southwest Miramichi River
- Basin countries: Canada

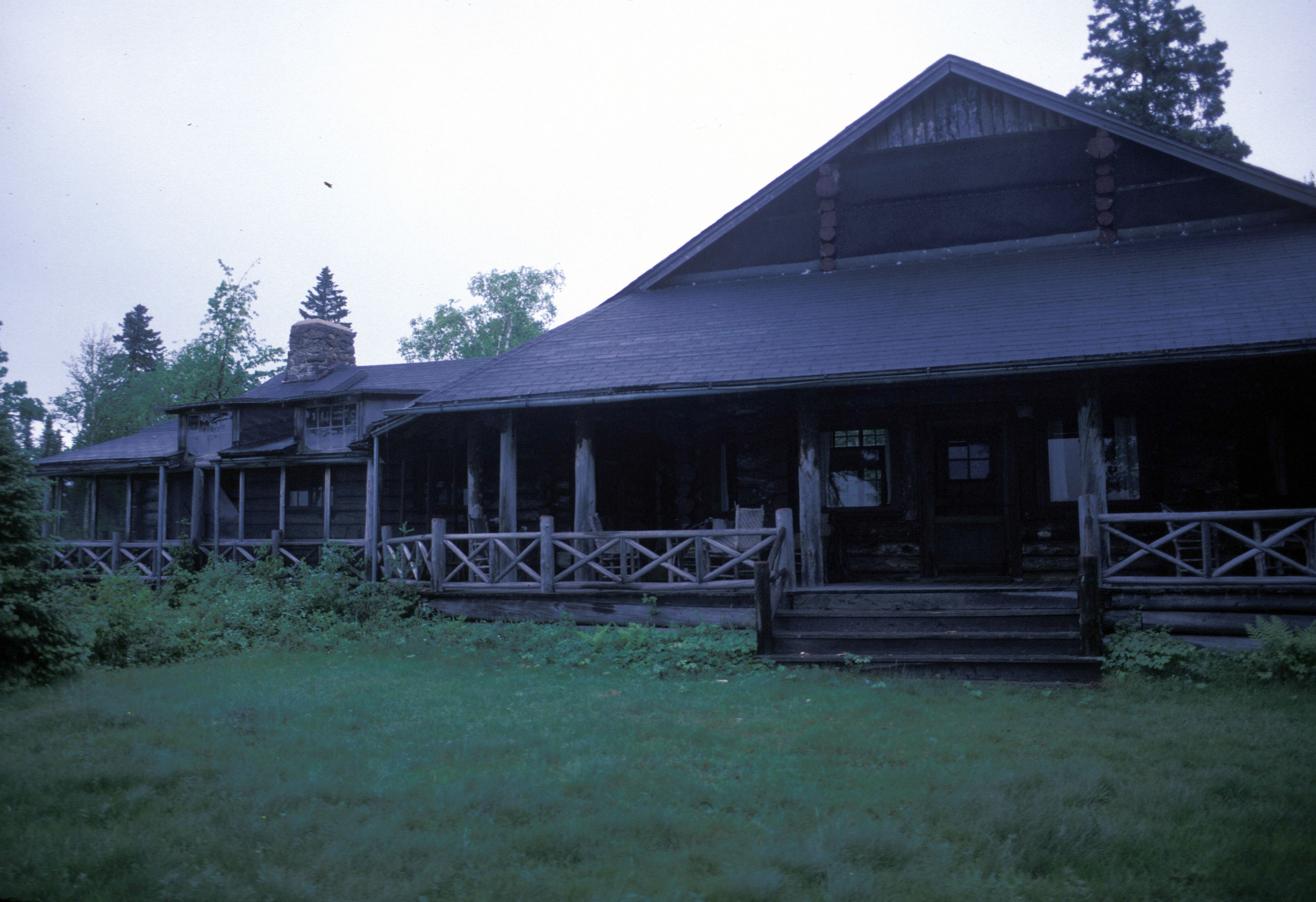
Main camp building and adult quarters at Pratt Camps

Holmes Lake is a Canadian lake in Northumberland County, New Brunswick.

Holmes Lake is one of several large lakes forming the headwaters of the Little Southwest Miramichi River. It was named in 1884 for the first lumberman who had worked the area

The lake has long been the exclusive fishery of the Pratt family of New York. After being introduced to the area by longtime guide Henry A. Braithwaite, George Dupont Pratt constructed the log camps at the lake in 1909. Ownership of the camps later passed to his son Sherman Pratt, co-founder of Marineland.

The Pratt family leased the fishing rights on this lake and the headwaters of the Little Southwest Miramichi River from the provincial government. Sherman Pratt was the founder of the Grenville Baker Boys Club (of Locust Valley, New York), and allowed the use of the Pratt Camp as a summer camp for its members, approximately hosting thirty boys each summer.

== See also ==
- List of lakes of New Brunswick
