= New Brunswick Route 425 =

Highway in New Brunswick, Canada

Coordinates: 46.969594°N 65.676956°W

Route 425

Route information
- Maintained by New Brunswick Department of Transportation

Major junctions
- West end: Route 420 in Red Bank
- East end: Route 8 in Jones Crossing

Location
- Country: Canada
- Province: New Brunswick
- Major cities: Sunny Corner, Boom Road, Whitney, Strathadam, Eel Ground,

Highway system
- Provincial highways in New Brunswick; Former routes
← Route 420	→ Route 430

Route 425 is a 30-kilometre (19 mi) long mostly west–east secondary highway in the northwest portion of New Brunswick, Canada.

The route's eastern terminus starts on Route 420 in Red Bank immediately crossing the Southwest Miramichi River to the north bank, passing Tozers Island. The road travels west passing through the community of Sunny Corner then the communities of Boom Road, and Whitney. The road then intersects with Route 435 before entering the community of Strathadam. The route then passes by McKay Cove then the community of Eel Ground before entering the community of Jones Crossing in the city of Miramichi at Route 8.

== Intersecting routes ==
Route 435
