= South Esk, New Brunswick =

Community in New Brunswick, Canada

Coordinates: 46.954539°N 65.657816°W

South Esk is a small community in Northumberland County, New Brunswick, located in Southesk Parish near Miramichi on Route 420.

== See also ==
- List of communities in New Brunswick
