= Upper Blackville, New Brunswick =

Community in New Brunswick, Canada

Coordinates: 46.650°N 65.867°W

Upper Blackville is a small community along the banks of the Miramichi River in Northumberland County, New Brunswick, Canada. Located along Route 8, As of 2013, Upper Blackville consisted of 200 people.

== Economy ==
The economy for this remote area depends on the forestry industry along with salmon fishing, a major tourist attraction for the area.

== See also ==
- List of communities in New Brunswick
