= McGraw Brook, New Brunswick =

Coordinates: 46.823°N 67.119°W

Location of McGraw Brook in New Brunswick

McGraw Brook is a settlement in New Brunswick. McGraw Brook is the location of McGraw Brook Provincial Park.

== See also ==
- List of communities in New Brunswick
