= North Pole Stream =

Tributary in New Brunswick, Canada

Coordinates: 46.9738°N 66.4722°W

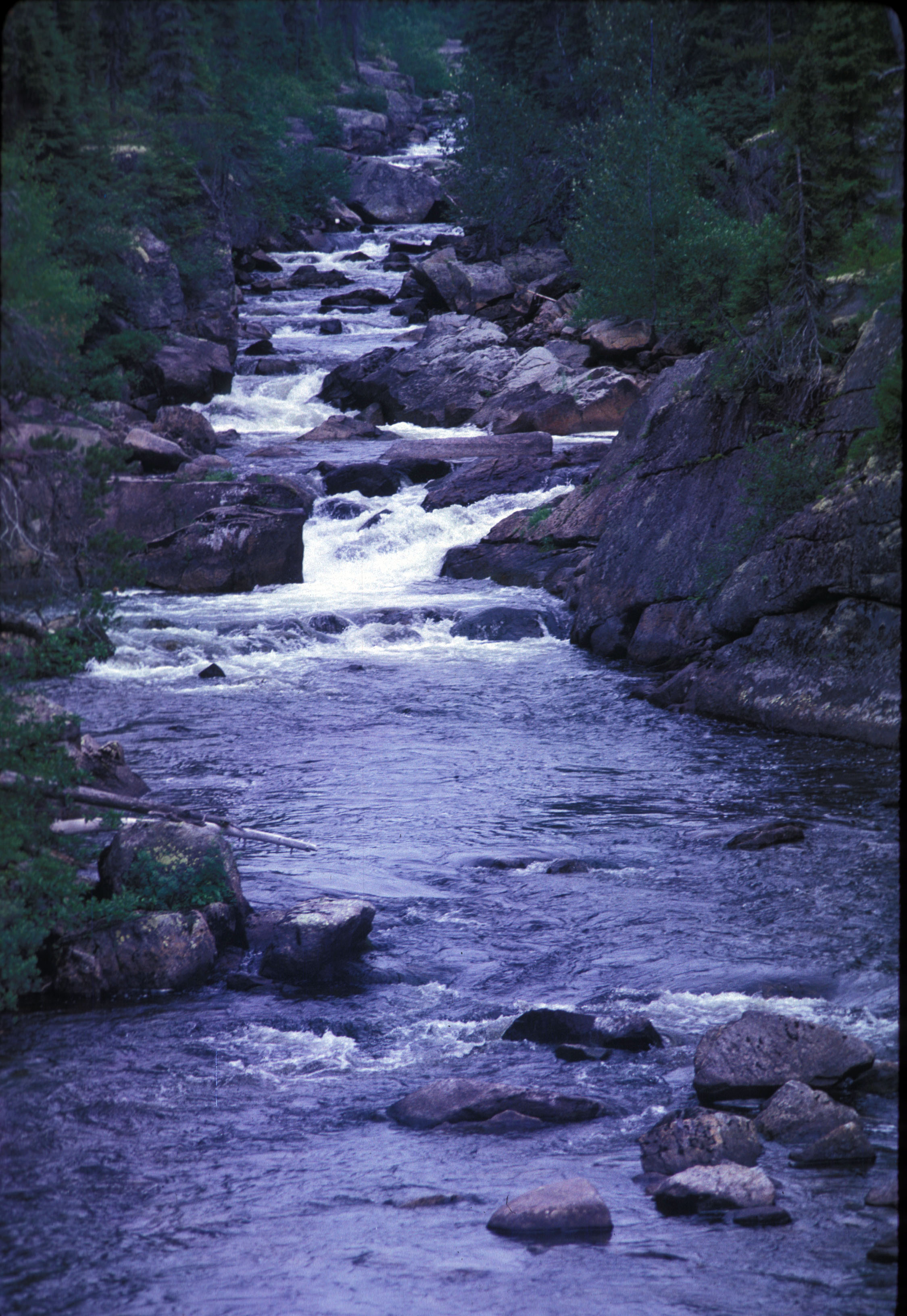
North Pole Stream (IR Walker 1986)

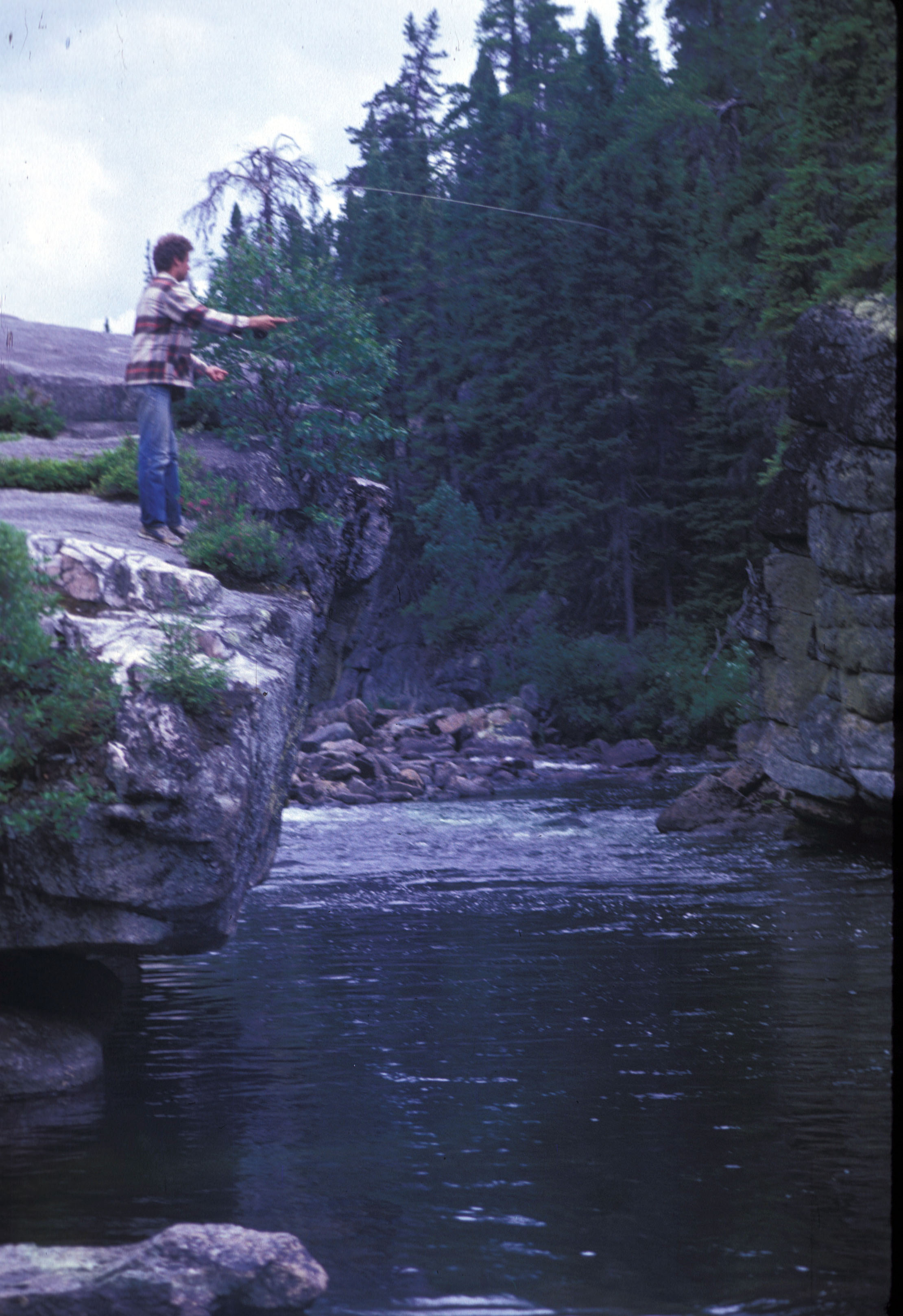
North Pole Stream (IR Walker 1986)

North Pole Stream is a tributary to the Little Southwest Miramichi River, with its headwaters in the Christmas Mountains of north-central, New Brunswick, Canada. It is an important spawning stream for Atlantic salmon, and renowned among fly fishers.

The Mi'kmaq referred to the stream as "Kadunnatquegak" (watching salmon in a pool).

The English name seems to have originated with lumbermen, about 1840. Two theories have been suggested for its origin:

- the most northerly point they had lumbered
- very cold conditions

The name inspired A. F. Wightman to name the adjacent peaks after Santa Claus' reindeer. These peaks are now referred to as the Christmas Mountains.

== See also ==
- List of bodies of water of New Brunswick
