= Lockstead, New Brunswick =

Coordinates: 46°46′9.8″N 65°51′28.5″W

Location of Lockstead in New Brunswick

Lockstead is a community in the Canadian province of New Brunswick. It is situated in Blackville, a parish of Northumberland County.

== See also ==
- List of communities in New Brunswick
