= White Rapids, New Brunswick =

Coordinates: 46.797°N 65.782°W

Location of White Rapids in New Brunswick

White Rapids is a settlement in Northumberland County, New Brunswick.

== See also ==
- List of communities in New Brunswick
