= Derby, New Brunswick =

Coordinates: 46.887722°N 65.655833°W

Location of Derby in New Brunswick

Derby is a community in Northumberland County, New Brunswick, Canada.

== See also ==
- List of communities in New Brunswick
