= Sillikers, New Brunswick =

Coordinates: 46°57′N 65°53′W

Sillikers is a Canadian rural community in Northumberland County, New Brunswick.

It is located on the Southwest Miramichi River along Highway 420.

== See also ==
- List of communities in New Brunswick
