= Cassilis, New Brunswick =

Rural community in New Brunswick, Canada

Coordinates: 46.945889°N 65.761694°W

Location of Cassilis in New Brunswick

Cassilis is a Canadian rural community in Northumberland County, New Brunswick, on Route 420. It is situated in Southesk, a parish of Northumberland County.

== See also ==
- List of communities in New Brunswick
