= Sunny Corner, New Brunswick =

Human settlement in New Brunswick, Canada

Coordinates: 46.9459°N 65.8148°W

Location of Sunny Corner in New Brunswick

Sunny Corner, New Brunswick is a rural settlement in Northumberland County, New Brunswick, Canada. It is located approximately 35 km west of Miramichi, New Brunswick, on the northeast bank of the Northwest Miramichi River, opposite, Red Bank. The community has an Irving gas station, a Royal Canadian Legion, a Lions Club, a police station serviced by the RCMP, a volunteer fire department, a hockey rink, and a seniors home.

The former local service district of Sunny Corner took its name from the community. In 2023 the entire local service district, including this community, was amalgamated into the incorporated rural community of Miramichi River Valley.

== Demographics ==
In the 2021 Census of Population conducted by Statistics Canada, Sunny Corner had a population of 737 living in 356 of its 381 total private dwellings, a change of −6.6% from its 2016 population of 789. With a land area of 17.65 km^{2} (6.81 sq mi), it had a population density of 41.8/km^{2} (108.1/sq mi) in 2021.

== Education ==
The community has both an elementary school (North & South Esk Elementary) and a high school (North & South Esk Regional).

== Arena ==
The community's hockey arena is located at 32 North West Road Sunny Corner, NB. Right between the NSEE school and NSER school.

== See also ==
- List of communities in New Brunswick
