= Little Southwest Miramichi River =

River in New Brunswick, Canada

Coordinates: 46.9289°N 65.9516°W

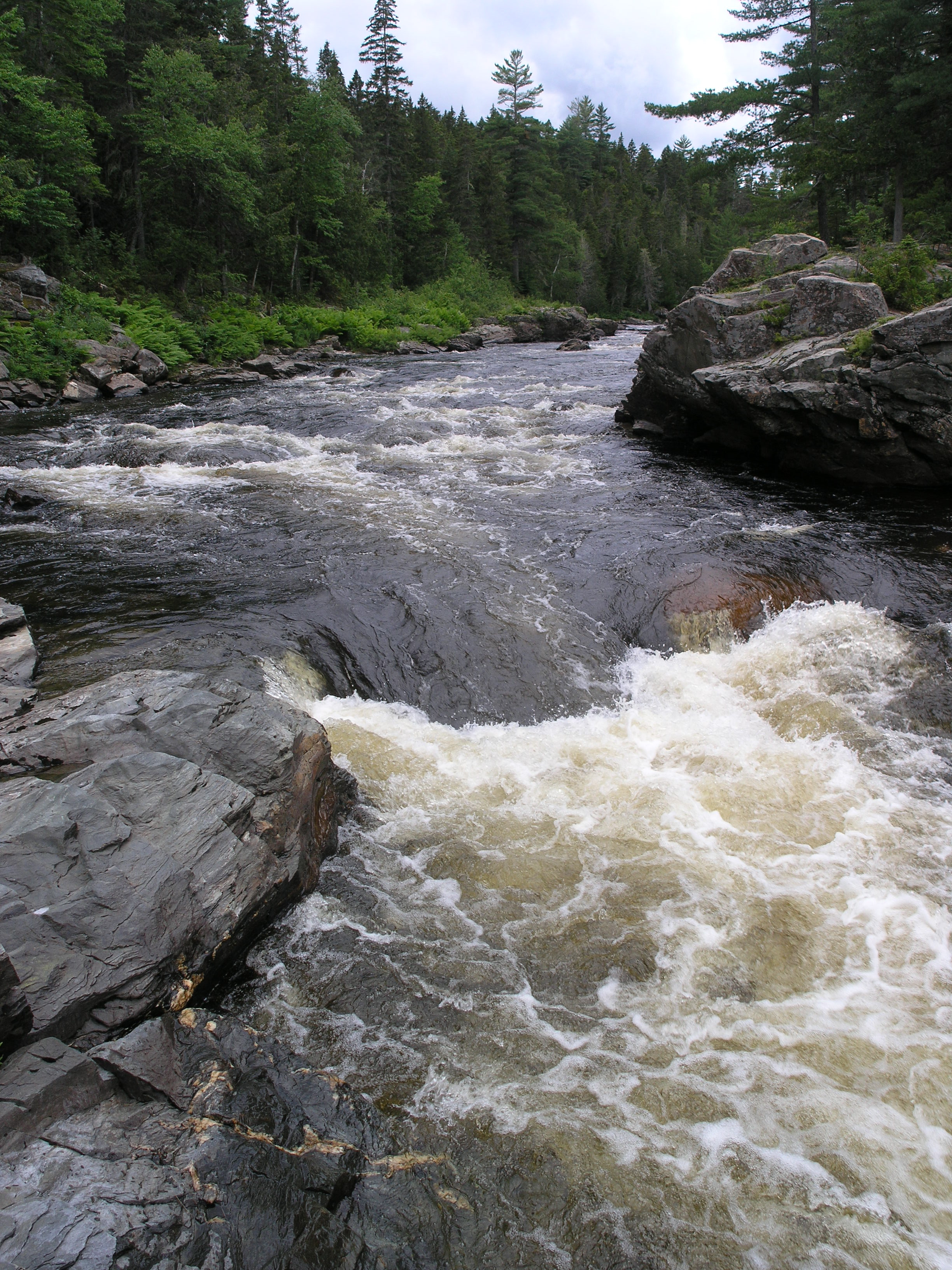
"Flaherty's Pitch" on the Little Southwest Miramichi River (IR Walker 2006).

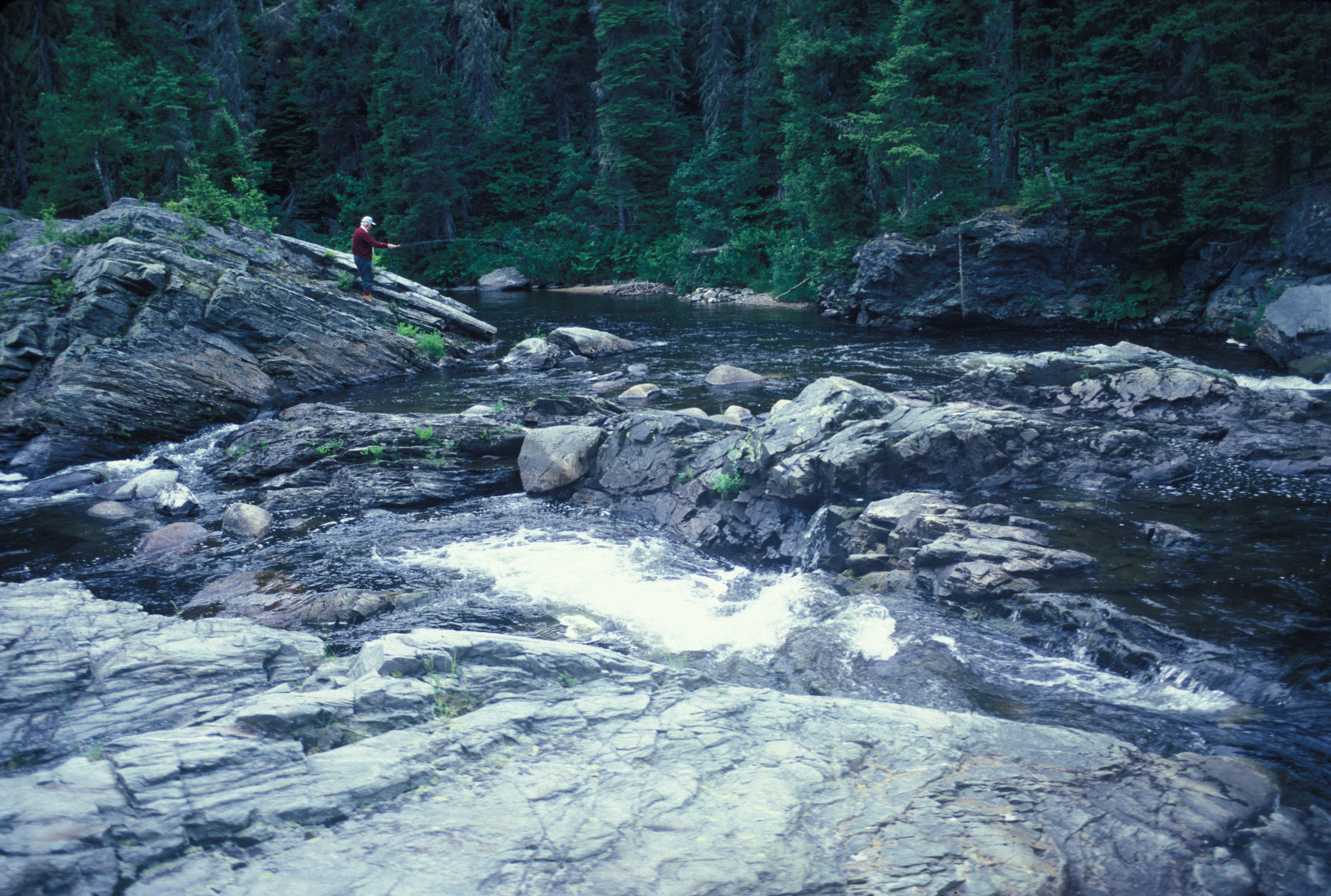
Lower North Branch Little Southwest Miramichi River, a tributary to the Little Southwest Miramichi River (IR Walker 1986).

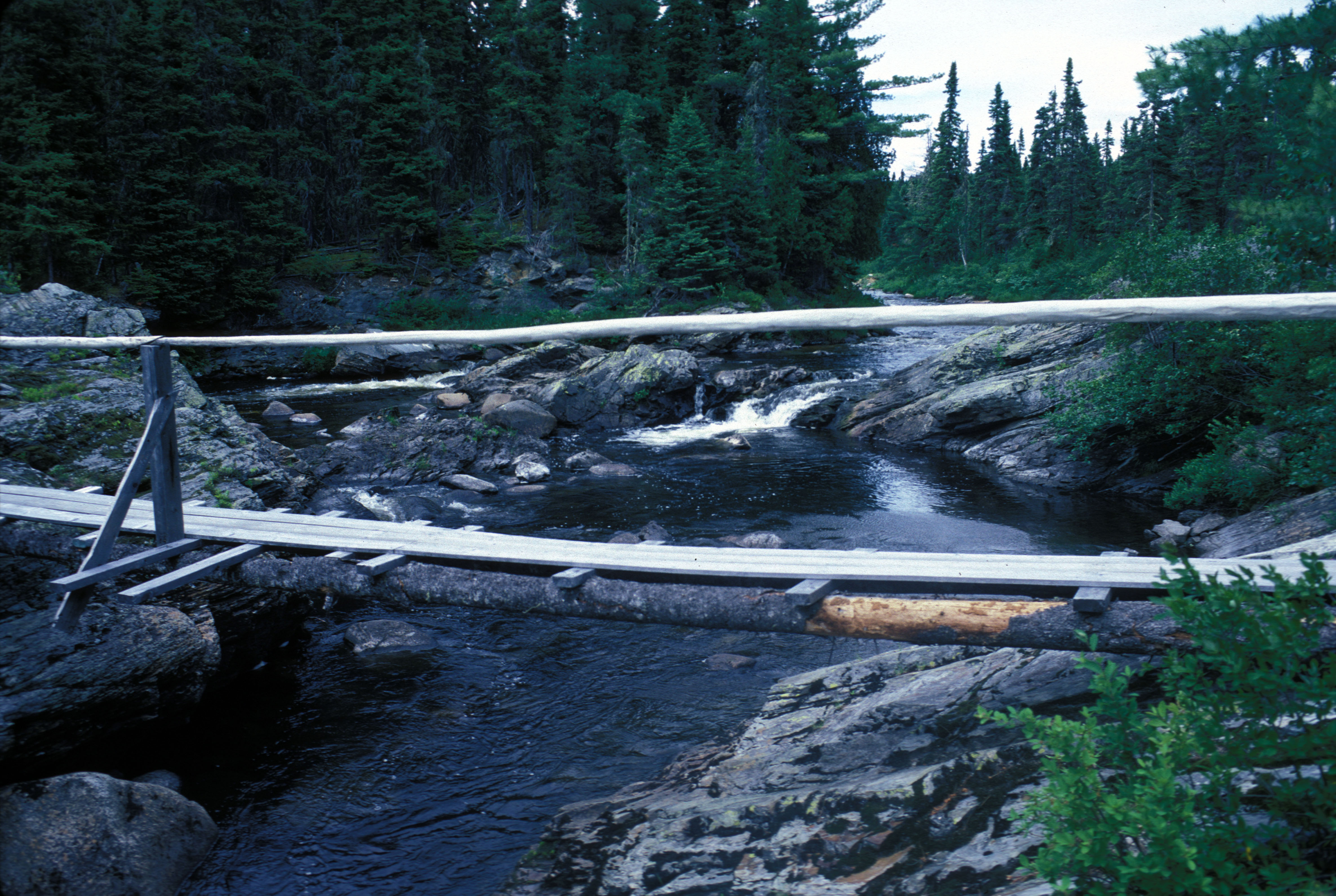
Lower North Branch Little Southwest Miramichi River, a tributary to the Little Southwest Miramichi River (IR Walker 1986).

The Little Southwest Miramichi River is a river in Northumberland County, New Brunswick, Canada. In Mi'kmaq it is referred to as "Tooadook".

== Geography ==
This river has its origins at Gover Lake in the Miramichi Highlands, part of the Appalachian Mountains. The river flows between the Northwest Miramichi River, to its north, and the Renous River to its south. It joins the Northwest Miramichi River at Red Bank, whereas the Renous River joins the Southwest Miramichi River at Renous.

The Northwest Miramichi River then joins the Southwest Miramichi River at Newcastle to form the Miramichi River.

The river is noted for Atlantic Salmon fishing. Many of the upper and middle stretches of the river are whitewater, and dangerous for canoeing; the lower part of the river is much more commonly canoed.

== Tributaries ==
- Northwest Branch Little Southwest Miramichi River
- Lower North Branch Little Southwest Miramichi River
- North Pole Stream
- Tuadook River

"Lower North Branch Little Southwest Miramichi River" is the ninth longest place name in Canada.

== See also ==
- List of rivers of New Brunswick
