= Metepenagiag Mi'kmaq Nation =

Mi'kmaq First Nation band government in New Brunswick, Canada

Metepenagiag Mi'kmaq Nation Metepena'qiaq (Mi'kmaq)
- Location of Metepenagiag in New Brunswick
- Coordinates: 46°56′00″N 65°49′00″W
- Country: Canada
- Province: New Brunswick
- County: Northumberland County
- Established: 1783

Government
  - Chief: Bill Ward
  - Council: Laurie Augustine; Roman Ward; Lawrence Ward; Kevin Levi; Adam Augustine Diana Webb
  - MLAs: Jake Stewart (PC); Robert Trevors (PC)

Area
  - Total: 39.07 km^{2} (15.09 sq mi)
- Lowest elevation: 0 m (0 ft)

Population (2006)
  - Total: 551
- Time zone: UTC-4 (Atlantic (AST))
  - Summer (DST): UTC-3 (ADT)
- Area code: 506 / 428
- NTS Map: 021I13
- Website: http://www.metepenagiag.ca/

Metepenagiag (Mi'kmaq: Metepna'qiaq), also known as Red Bank, is a Mi'kmaq First Nation band government in New Brunswick, Canada on the other side of the Miramichi river from Sunny Corner.

== Pre-history ==
Metepenagiag Mi'kmaq Nation are located at the head of tide of the Miramichi River. For thousands of years Mi’kmaq communities along New Brunswick's northeastern shore lived near tidal estuaries where tidal saltwater flows inland and creates an ecosystem for "anadromous fish species such as salmon, sturgeon, gaspereau or alewife, striped bass, and eel, that seasonally move up the estuaries in large numbers." Some of these species spawned above the ‘head of tide’ and up the freshwater streams.

Although officially recognised in 1783, Metepenagiag has been home to a Mi'kmaq community for over 3000 years, making it the oldest continuously settled community in New Brunswick.

=== Augustine Mound ===
Evidence for the age of the community was revealed in 1972 by Joseph Mike Augustine. After reading a 1972 National Geographic article about an ancient burial mound in Arizona, Augustine recalled the mound where his father had taken him near his home. The mound was on the caribou hunting trail that he and his father used regularly and they stopped to rest there.

"They'd make a fire and have some tea or a bit of something to eat, and Augustine's father would tell him of the history of this place. In times past, his father would say, Indians would celebrate here, building a fire in the centre of the mound and dancing around it. It was those Indians, his father said, who built the mound."

— Petten, 1995

The artifacts found at the site (the Augustine Mound), and a second nearby site (the Oxbow site) demonstrated that Metepenagiag had been continuously inhabited for over 3000 years, and that the community enjoyed trading relationships with other First Nations communities, stretching as far west as the Ohio River Valley.

There has been some disagreement among residents concerning naming this important cultural and spiritual site, The Augustine Mound. While it was Joe Mike Augustine who first brought attention to the ancient burial site, most residents were aware of its existence. The name also falsely suggests that it is only the resting place of members of the Augustine family. While this is likely true, the mound was likely a community burial site, meaning that many of the oldest families of Metepenagiag have ancestors interred therein. Some feel the much more inclusive "Metepenagiag Mound" would better describe and honor those whose remains lie beneath the mound.

In 1975 the Augustine Mound was designated as a National Historic Site of Canada. The Augustine Mound has similarities to the elaborate burial rites of the Adena culture of the Ohio Valley and contained materials that were not local including copper from Lake Superior area. Turnbull argues that the Red Bank people were part of a broad Northeastern pre-contact trade network. He also suggested that some Maritime people adopted aspects of the Adena culture and religion. Keenlyside claims that Adena culture peoples moved to Atlantic Canada. Ceramic fragments also found at Red Bank are illustrative of the ceramic technology in use by Maritime First Nations 2,500 to 3,000 years ago.

=== Oxbow ===
In 1982, the nearby Oxbow archaeological site, located within the reserve land of the Metepenagiag Mi’kmaq Nation on an oxbow bend of the Southwest Miramichi River, was also designated a National Historic Site of Canada for its role as "witness and record of 3000 years of continuous Mi’kmaq use of the site".

The Oxbow "contains evidence of 3,000 years of Mi’kmaq history (from 1,000 BC to the present) on the north bank of the Little Southwest Miramichi River at the head of tide. Annual flooding of the river bank has created a well-stratified site in which the cultural development through time is preserved in multiple layers of sediment. This deep stratigraphic development is virtually unique in Maritime Canada.

— Parks Canada

Over 100 additional archaeological sites have been discovered in the area since 1975. Metepenagiaq First Nations now has their Metepenagiag Heritage Park.

== History ==
Although the Red Bank Band lands established by the New Brunswick Order-in-Council in 1808 comprised 10,000 acres, settlers and squatters occupied almost all of allocated land by the late 1830s. Only the village at Red Bank and the back wood lots were left for the Band. Under the Specific Claims Policy (2005), it was found that the 1895 alleged surrender of land was invalid and the Metepenagiag Mi'kmaq Nation negotiated for more land.

== Notable people ==
- Joe Mike Augustine - discoverer of the Augustine Mound
- Noah Augustine - Native activist and former chief

== See also ==
- List of communities in New Brunswick
- List of First Nations in New Brunswick
