= Renous River =

Canadian river in New Brunswick

Coordinates: 46°48′49.2″N 65°47′38.3″W

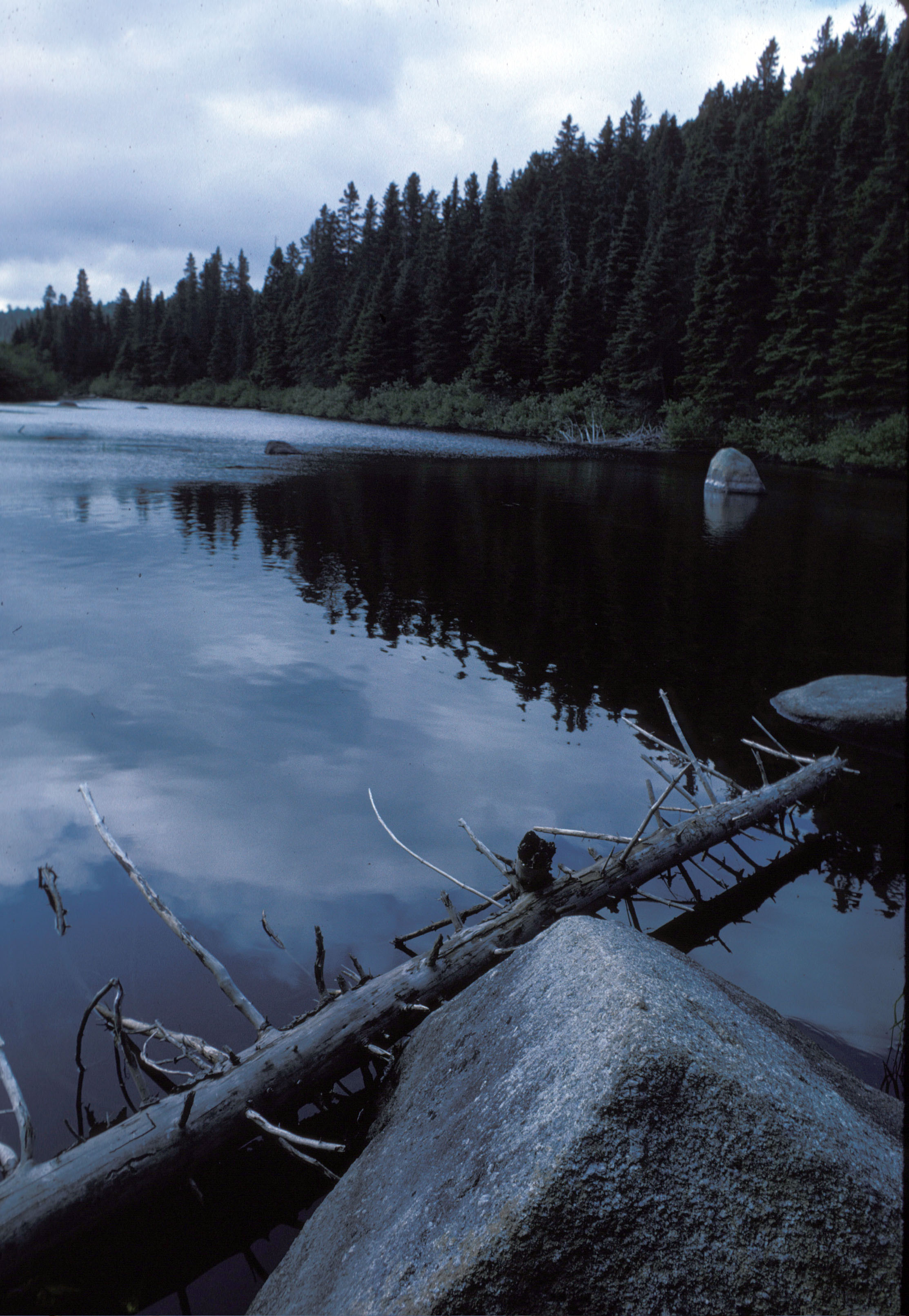
North Renous River near mouth of McKendrick Brook, New Brunswick, Canada (IR Walker 1977)

The Renous River is a tributary of the Southwest Miramichi River in New Brunswick, Canada.

The Renous River has its origins south of Holmes Lake in the Miramichi Highlands, part of the Appalachian Mountains, in the northwest corner of Northumberland County.

Renous River system consists of the two major branches, the North and the South, which merge and flow for 20 kilometers through thick jack pine forests to join the Southwest Miramichi River at the village of Quarryville in Renous.

The river is classified as a wandering river, seeing as it is composed of individual anabranches that flow in single channels around semi-permanent islands. Wandering rivers, such as the Renous provide habitats for a diverse array of aquatic and semi-aquatic organisms, including salmonoids.

Like many of the rivers in the Mirimichi River System, the Renous river is noted for Atlantic salmon fishing. The annual run of Atlantic salmon begins each June and runs through early autumn. Fishing is restricted to fly fishing only and all large salmon must be released. Popular salmon flies on the Renous River include the Black Bear series, Butterfly, Silver Cosseboom, and small deer-hair Buck Bugs, as well as a local fly pattern known as the Renous River Special.

== Tributaries ==
- North Renous River
- South Renous River
- Little South Renous River
- Dungarvon River

== See also ==
- List of rivers of New Brunswick
