= Renous-Quarryville =

Place in New Brunswick, Canada

Coordinates: 46°49′N 65°48′W

Renous-Quarryville (2020 population: 1188) was a Canadian local service district in Northumberland County, New Brunswick, located 25 mi upstream of Miramichi, situated where the Renous River, and the Indiantown brook. discharges into the Southwest Miramichi River. It was named for the Renous river, and settlement, as well as Quarryville's quarry, hence the name "Renous-Quarryville local service district." It is now part of the incorporated rural community of Miramichi River Valley.

Renous proper, and the river is probably named for a Micmac chief, Sock Renou.

Renous-Quarryville is 5 kilometres east of Miramichi River Valley where the majority of students attend school, although many also attend Millerton school.

The community is the site of the Atlantic Institution, a Correctional Service of Canada maximum-security prison located on the site of a former Canadian Forces ammunition depot.

On March 30, 2019, the Tom Donovan Arena in Renous was named 2019 winner of the Kraft Hockeyville national contest, with a $250,000 prize for arena upgrades and an NHL pre-season game to be played in the area on September 18, 2019. On that date, the Montreal Canadiens faced the Florida Panthers. Said game had taken place in the city of Bathurst, about an hour away.

== Demographics ==
In the 2021 Census of Population conducted by Statistics Canada, Renous-Quarryville had a population of 1,036 living in 395 of its 423 total private dwellings, a change of 0.7% from its 2016 population of 1,029. With a land area of 65.22 km^{2} (25.18 sq mi), it had a population density of 15.9/km^{2} (41.1/sq mi) in 2021.

Population of Renous-Quarryville
Name	Parish	Population (2021)	Population (2016)	Change	Land area (km^{2})	Population density
Renous-Quarryville part A	Blackville	710	723	−1.8%	39.6	17.9/km^{2}
Renous-Quarryville part B	Derby	326	306	+6.5%	25.62	12.7/km^{2}
Total	—	1,036	1,029	+0.7%	65.22	15.9/km^{2}

== See also ==
- List of communities in New Brunswick
