= Red Bank, New Brunswick =

Human settlement in New Brunswick, Canada

Coordinates: 46°56′N 65°49′W

Location of Red Bank in New Brunswick

Red Bank (Mi'kmaq: Metepna'qiaq) is a small rural community (unincorporated area) in Northumberland County, New Brunswick, Canada. It is located approximately 20 km west of Miramichi, New Brunswick, at the mouth of the Little Southwest Miramichi River, at its confluence with the Northwest Miramichi River. The community lies on the southwest bank of the NW Miramichi and opposite its sister community Sunny Corner around the intersection of Route 420 and Route 425.

A post office has existed here since 1854.

In 1871 Red Bank had a population of 175, and in 1898 Red Bank had a population of 200.

The community now counts a population of 398 people as of 2020, and goes up and down depending on season (with a high population during Summer).

== Notable people ==
- Charles Hubbard

== See also ==
- List of communities in New Brunswick
