= Northwest Miramichi River =

River in New Brunswick, Canada

Coordinates: 46°57′57.9″N 65°35′38.5″W

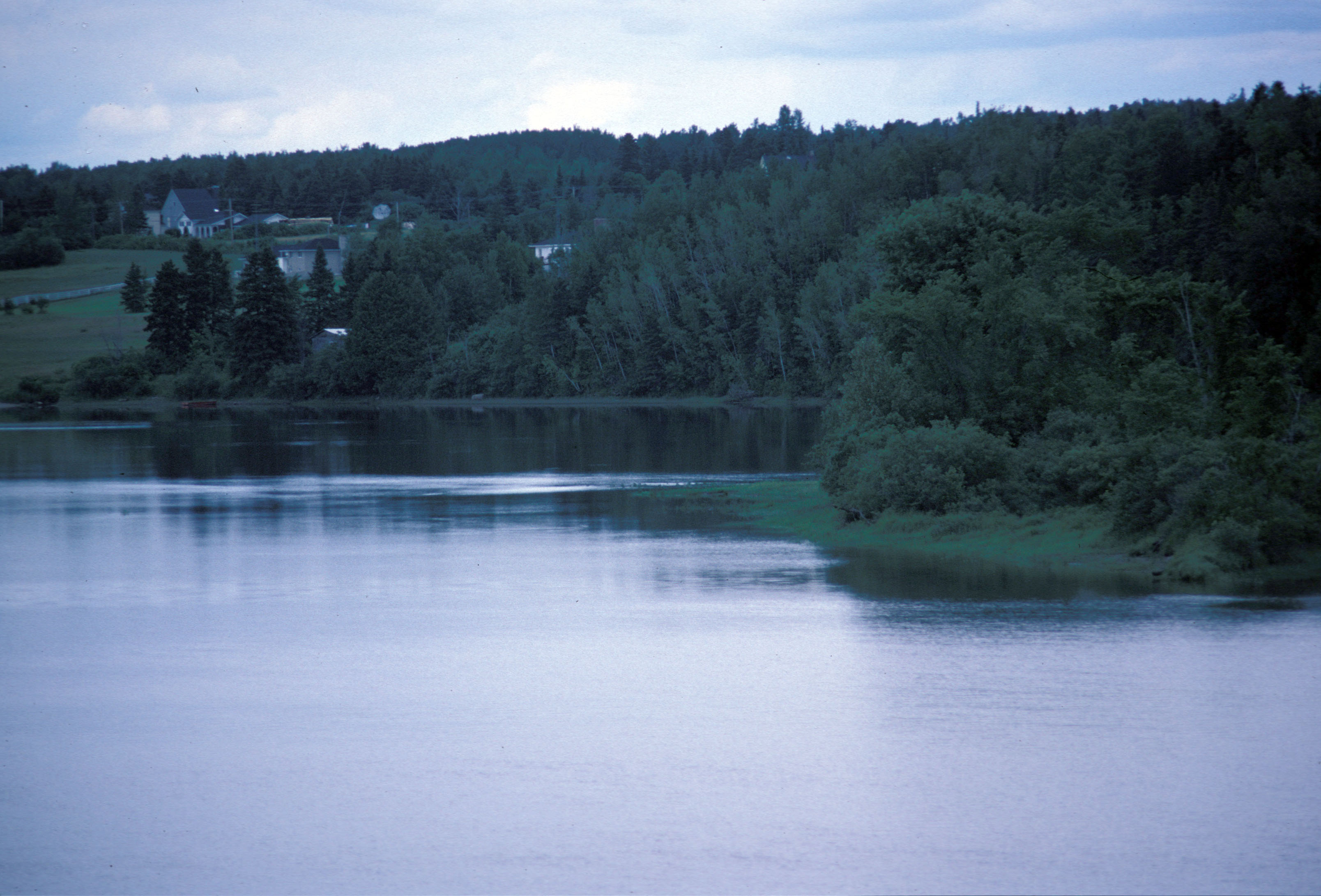
Northwest Miramichi River, New Brunswick, Canada (IR Walker 1986)

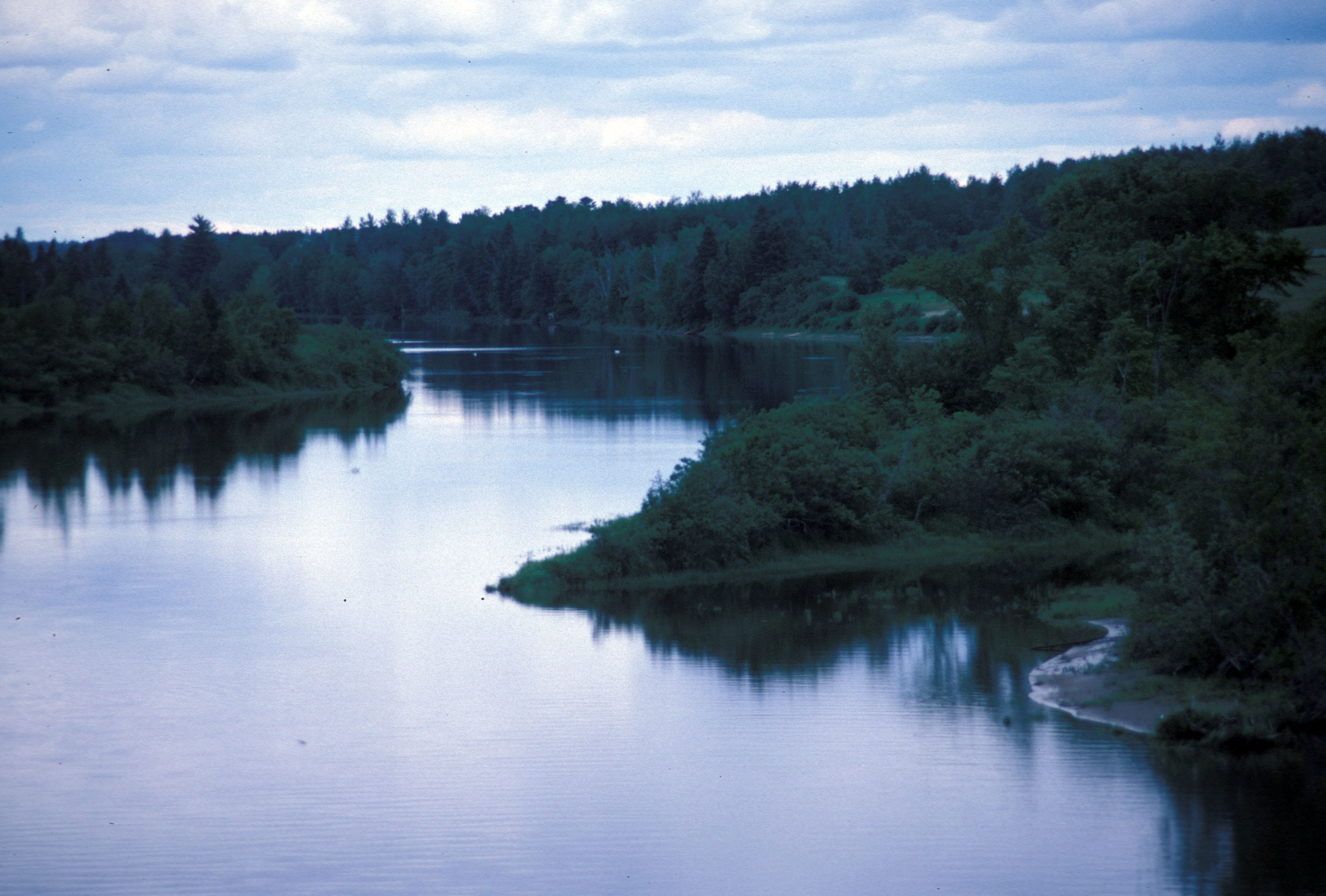
Northwest Miramichi River, New Brunswick, Canada (IR Walker 1986)

The Northwest Miramichi River or Elmunokun is a river in New Brunswick, Canada. The Mi'kmaq referred to the river as Elmunokun, possibly meaning "a beaver hole" in reference to a deep pool in the river, just below the mouth of the Big Sevogle River, its second largest tributary, after the Little Southwest Miramichi.

The Northwest Miramichi River has its origins near Big Bald Mountain in the Miramichi Highlands, part of the Appalachian Mountains in Northumberland County. Initially flowing east, the river turns south at the confluence of the Tomogonops River and Portage River. It continues south to Sunny Corner where it becomes tidal, and then flows east. The Northwest Miramichi River joins the Southwest Miramichi River at Newcastle, NB to form the Miramichi River.

The river is noted for Atlantic Salmon fishing. The headwaters offer important spawning sites for Atlantic Salmon; thus, much of the upper river is either closed to fishing, or designated as Crown Reserve and subject to special fishing regulations.

In spring canoeists often run the lower stretch of the river from Miner's Bridge (where the river first crosses Route 430), south to Redbank and Sunny Corner.

== Tributaries ==
- Little River
- Tomogonops River
- Portage River
- Big Sevogle River
- Little Sevogle River
- Little Southwest Miramichi River

== See also ==
- List of rivers of New Brunswick
