= Northumberland County, New Brunswick =

County in New Brunswick, Canada

Coordinates: 47°02′N 65°35′W

Northumberland
- County
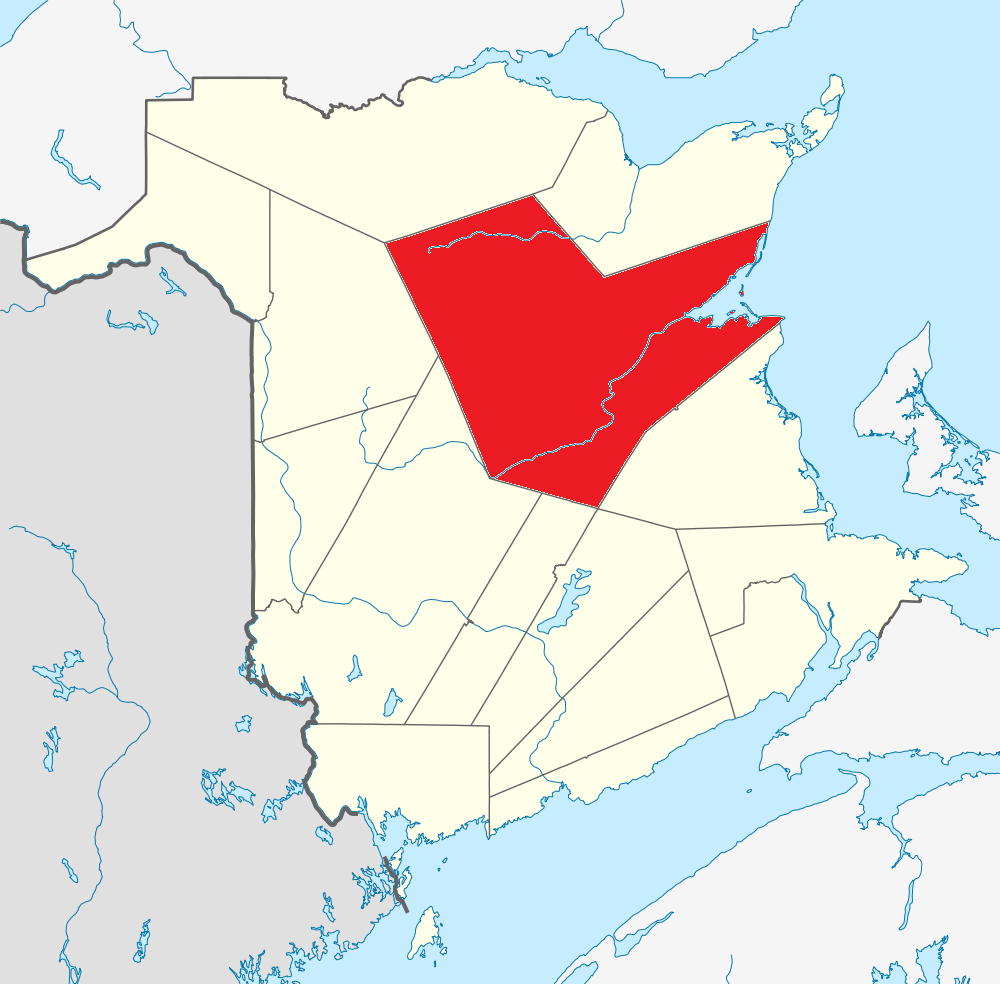
- Location within New Brunswick.
- Country: Canada
- Province: New Brunswick
- Established: 1785

Area
  - Land: 12,843.39 km^{2} (4,958.86 sq mi)

Population (2021)
  - Total: 45,005
  - Density: 3.5/km^{2} (9.1/sq mi)
  - Change 2016-21: ▲0.1%
  - Dwellings: 21,940
- Time zone: UTC-4 (AST)
  - Summer (DST): UTC-3 (ADT)
- Area code: 506

Northumberland County is located in northeastern New Brunswick, Canada.

== Geography ==
Northumberland County is covered by thick forests, whose products stimulate the economy. The highest peaks in the province, including Mount Carleton lie in the northwestern corner of the county.

The county is dominated by the Miramichi River, world famous for its salmon fishing. The lower portion of the river is an estuary that widens into Miramichi Bay, a part of the Gulf of St. Lawrence.

== Services ==
The city of Miramichi is a local service centre for the county and surrounding regions with schools, hospitals and government offices and retail locations. The county has several saw mills in the city of Miramichi and up the Southwest Branch of the Miramichi River. There were formerly two large pulp and paper mills at Miramichi.

Chatham was also home to an air force base, CFB Chatham, until 1996. Renous-Quarryville, located along the Southwest Miramichi was also home to an army post - a federal maximum security penitentiary is now located on the site.

== Census subdivisions ==
=== Communities ===
There are five municipalities within the county (listed by 2016 population):

Official name	Designation	Area km^{2}	Population	Parish
Miramichi	City	179.47	17,537	Nelson; Newcastle
Neguac	Village	26.75	1,684	Alnwick
Rogersville	Village	7.20	1,166	Rogersville
Blackville	Village	21.13	958	Blackville
Doaktown	Village	29.07	792	Blissfield

=== First Nations ===
There are five First Nations reserves in Northumberland County (listed by 2011 population):

Official name	Designation	Area km^{2}	Population	Parish
Esgenoôpetitj 14	Reserve	9.54	1,046	Alnwick
Eel Ground 2	Reserve	10.90	448	Northesk
Red Bank 4	Reserve	16.18	352	Southesk
Big Hole Tract 8 (South)	Reserve	27.82	34	Northesk
Tabusintac 9	Reserve	22.00	10	Alnwick

Three communities in the county are part of the Miꞌkmaq Nation: Metepenagiag Miꞌkmaq Nation, at the junction of the Northwest Miramichi River and the Little Southwest Miramichi River; Eel Ground First Nation, close to the junction of the Northwest and Southwest Miramichi Rivers near Newcastle; and Burnt Church First Nation on the northern shore of Miramichi Bay.

=== Parishes ===
The county is subdivided into thirteen parishes (listed by 2016 population):

Official name	Area km^{2}	Population	Municipalities	Unincorporated communities
Alnwick	669.09	3,640	Neguac (village); Esgenoôpetitj 14 (reserve); Tabusintac 9 (reserve)	Barryville / Oak Point-Bartibog Bridge / Bayshore / Blacklands / Brantville / Breau Road / Burnt Church / Cains Point / Christies Landing / Covedell / Drisdelle Settlement / Fairisle / Gaythorne / Lagacéville / Lauvergot / Lavillette / Lower Bartibogue / Old Dans Landing / Pontgravé / Price Settlement / Rivière-des-Caches / Rivière-du-Portage / Robichaud Settlement / Saint-Wilfred / Sheldrake Island / Stymiest Road / Tabusintac / The Willows / Village-Saint-Laurent / Winston / Wishart Point
Northesk	3,355.15	2,263	Eel Ground 2 (reservation); Big Hole Tract 8 (reservation)	Bear House / Big Hole / Boom Road / Chaplin Island Road / Curtis Settlement / Curventon / Eel Ground / Exmoor / Heath Steele / Indian Falls Depot / Lumsden Road / Maple Glen / Mathias Landing / North Esk Boom / Popple Depot / Redstone Rapids / Sevogle / Strathadam / Sunny Corner / Trout Brook / Wayerton / Whitney
Hardwicke	278.60	2,201		Auburnville / Baie-Sainte-Anne / Bay du Vin / Bay du Vin Beach / Eel River Bridge / Escuminac / Fox Island / Gregan / Hardwicke / Hardwood Settlement / Hortons Creek / Manuels / Point Gardiner / Vin Island
Blackville	824.02	2,028	Blackville (village)	Barnett / Barnettville / Hardscramble / Keenan Siding / Lockstead / Smith Crossing / Shinnickburn
Southesk	2,467.02	1,694	Red Bank 4 (reservation)	Cassilis / Dennis / Garden Road / Halcomb / Harris Brook Settlement / Loggie Lodge / Lyttleton / Maple Hill / Matthews / Pratts Camp / Ramsay Lodge / Red Bank / Red Rock / Sillikers / South Esk / Warwick Settlement / Williamstown
Glenelg	505.21	1,560		Bay du Vin Mills / Black River Bridge / Centre Napan / Fowlies Mill / Glenwood / Little Branch / Lower Napan / McKenzie Settlement / Napan Bay / Point aux Carr / Redmondville / St. Margarets / Victoria / Wine River
Ludlow	1,016.66	1,543 (note)		Carrolls Crossing / Ludlow / McNamee / Porter Cove / Priceville
Newcastle	578.92	1,136	Miramichi (city)	Bartibog / Beaver Brook Station / Bellefond / Beveridge / Busby / East Beaver Brook / Elizabethton / Highbank / Little Bartibog / Lower Newcastle-Russellville / McEwan Dam / Morrissy / Patterson Siding / Patterson Station / Telly Road Crossing
Rogersville	326.33	1,102	Rogersville (village)	Collette / East Collette / Lakeland / Marcelville / Murray Settlement / North Rogersville / Pleasant Ridge / Regneautville / Rosaireville / Sapin-Court / Shediac Ridge / St. Bernard / Vienneau / West Collette / Young Ridge
Derby	61.01	976		Bryenton / Davidson, New Brunswick / Derby / Derby Junction / Elmtree / Lower Derby / Manderville / Millerton / Northwest Bridge / Parker Road / Renous-Quarryville / South Nelson Road / Upper Derby
Nelson	354.57	957	Miramichi (city)	Barnaby River / Chelmsford / Doyles Brook / Hughes / Kirkwood / Lower Barnaby / McKinleyville / Passmore / Semiwagan Ridge / Upper Barnaby
Chatham	22.70	511		Lower Napan / Middle Island / Savoy Beach / Snyders Beach / Upper Napan
Blissfield	1,240.54	450	Doaktown (village)	Amostown / O'Donnelltown / Storeytown

- note: Statistics Canada did not report data for Ludlow Parish in the 2016 Census. Data shown is from 2011 Census.

== Demographics ==
Historical Census Data - Northumberland County, New Brunswick
Year	Pop.	±%
1991	52,983	—
1996	52,153	−1.6%
2001	50,817	−2.6%
2006	48,868	−3.8%
2006A	49,714	+1.7%
2011	48,355	−2.7%
2011R	46,204	−4.4%
2016	44,952	−2.7%
2021	45,005	+0.1%
(A) adjustment due to boundary change. (R) 2011 population was revised.

As a census division in the 2021 Census of Population conducted by Statistics Canada, Northumberland County had a population of 45,005 living in 19,945 of its 21,940 total private dwellings, a change of 0.1% from its 2016 population of 44,952. With a land area of 12,843.39 km^{2} (4,958.86 sq mi), it had a population density of 3.5/km^{2} (9.1/sq mi) in 2021.

Canada census – Northumberland community profile

	2021	2016	2011
Population	45,005 (+0.1% from 2016)	44,952 (-2.7**% from 2011)	48,355** (-2.7% from 2006)
Land area	12,843.39 km^{2} (4,958.86 sq mi)	12,868.78 km^{2} (4,968.66 sq mi)	12,932.70 km^{2} (4,993.34 sq mi)
Population density	3.5/km^{2} (9.1/sq mi)	3.5/km^{2} (9.1/sq mi)	3.7/km^{2} (9.6/sq mi)
Median age	50.8 (M: 50, F: 52)	49.1 (M: 48.3, F: 49.9)	46.4 (M: 45.5, F: 47.1)
Private dwellings	19,945 (total)	21,792 (total)	22,078 (total)
Median household income		$55,223	$47,858

Notes: **2011 population was revised to 46,204
References: 2021 2016 2011

=== Language ===
Canada Census Mother Tongue - Northumberland County, New Brunswick
Census	Total	English			French			English & French			Non-official languages		
Year	Responses	Count	Trend	Pop %	Count	Trend	Pop %	Count	Trend	Pop %	Count	Trend	Pop %
2016	44,425	33,095	▼1.9%	74.49%	9,705	▼20.2%	21.85%	420	▲3.7%	0.95%	1,055	▼5.4%	2.38%
2011	47,425	33,750	▼0.7%	71.16%	12,155	▼4.1%	25.63%	405	▲80.0%	0.85%	1,115	▼26.4%	2.35%
2006	48,185	33,775	▼3.7%	70.09%	12,670	▼6.4%	26.29%	225	▼40.8%	0.47%	1,515	▲31.7%	3.14%
2001	50,155	35,090	▼3.7%	69.96%	13,535	▼2.1%	26.99%	380	▲2.7%	0.76%	1,150	▲48.4%	2.29%
1996	51,390	36,420	n/a	70.87%	13,825	n/a	26.90%	370	n/a	0.72%	775	n/a	1.51%

== Access Routes ==
Highways and numbered routes that run through the county, including external routes that start or finish at the county limits:

- Highways
  - Route 8
  - Route 11
- Principal Routes
  - Route 108
  - Route 117
  - Route 118
  - Route 123
  - Route 126
  - Route 134
- Secondary Routes:
  - Route 425
  - Route 430
  - Route 445
  - Route 450
  - Route 455
  - Route 625
- External Routes:
  - None

== See also ==
- List of communities in New Brunswick
