= List of mines in New Brunswick =

This is a list of mines in New Brunswick, Canada.

Mine	Major commodities	Coordinates	Associated town	Owner	Dates	Comments	References
Austin Brook Iron Mine	Iron		Bathurst	Dominion Steel and Coal Company	1911-1913; 1943-?		
Brunswick 12 mine	Lead, Zinc, Copper	47°28′48″N 65°52′30″W	Bathurst	Xstrata	1964-2013		
Brunswick 6 mine	Lead, Zinc, Copper	47°24′32″N 65°49′05″W	Bathurst	Brunswick Mining and Smelting Company	1966-1983		
Caribou zinc mine	Lead, Zinc, Copper		Bathurst	Trevali Mining Corporation	1970-		
Chester Mine							
CNE Mine							
Heath Steele Mines	Lead, Zinc, Copper	47°17′00″N 66°04′00″W	Miramichi	Noranda	1957-1999		
Key Anacon Mine							
Picadilly mine	Potash		Sussex	PotashCorp	2010-2016		
Murray Brook Mine		47°31′34″N 66°25′53″W			1989-1992		
North Zone mine	Tin, Zinc, Indium						
Stratmat Boundary Mine							
Wedge Mine	Copper	47°23′46″N 66°07′44″W		Teck Resources	1962-1968		
