= New Brunswick Route 430 =

Highway in New Brunswick

Coordinates: 47.392307°N 65.959854°W

Route 430

Route information
- Maintained by New Brunswick Department of Transportation
- Length: 110 km (68 mi)

Major junctions
- North end: Route 8 / Route 117 in Newcastle; Route 11 in Bathurst
- South end: Route 134 in Bathurst

Location
- Country: Canada
- Province: New Brunswick
- Major cities: Warwick Settlement, New Brunswick,

Highway system
- Provincial highways in New Brunswick; Former routes
← Route 425	→ Route 435

Route 430 is a 110-kilometre-long (68 mi) mostly north–south secondary highway in the northwest portion of New Brunswick, Canada.

The route's southern terminus starts at the eastern bank of the Miramichi River on the east side of the Miramichi Bridge on the intersection on Route 117 and Route 8 in the community of Newcastle. The road starts as Harvey Street and then Beaverbrook Blvd before separating from Route 8 when it continues north. The road continues north passing the northern terminus of Route 435 through Chaplin Island Road before turning east traveling through the settlement of Trout Brook before entering the community of Wayerton on the east bank of the Miramichi River passing McNeill Island.

Continuing north, the road passes Chaplin Island before moving away of the river traveling north east crossing the <> River then several quarries before entering the Heath Steele Mines in Heath Steele. The road then continues north crossing the Nepisiguit River before taking a sharp turn near Wedge Mine moving east following the Nepisiguit River east passing the Brunswick 6 mine and Brunswick 12 mine then the northern terminus of Route 360 and Pabineau Lake before passing through the community of Big River then entering the neighbourhood of Rough Waters in Bathurst at the intersection of Route 11.

== Intersecting routes ==
- Route 360
- Route 435
