= Caribou Mine =

Caribou Mine may refer to:

- Caribou zinc mine, a zinc mine in New Brunswick, Canada.
- Caribou Mines, Nova Scotia, a gold mining district in Nova Scotia, Canada.
- Caribou silver mine, a silver mine in Colorado, USA.
