= North Zone =

North Zone or Northern Zone may refer to:

- North Zone of Afghanistan
- North Zone cricket team, an Indian first-class cricket team
- North Zone cricket team (Bangladesh)
- North Zone Cultural Centre in Patiala, Punjab, India
- North Zone mine, a large open pit mine in New Brunswick, Canada
- Northern Indo-Aryan languages
- Northern Railway zone of Indian Railways
- Zona Norte (LMB), of the Mexican Baseball League
- Zona Norte, Tijuana, Mexico
- Zone occupée, the occupied zone of France during the Second World War
