= Charlotte Sutherland =

Daughter of James Sutherland (English settler)

Charlotte Sutherland was born at Caron Point, near present-day Bathurst, New Brunswick in 1799, the daughter of James, an English settler. At the age of 20, she travelled overland in mid-winter to Fredericton, a distance of 250 km, to save the family farm from repossession by the province.

== Background ==
James Sutherland, an Englishman of Scottish descent, and his wife arrived in Boston around 1786, shortly after the cessation of the American Revolution. He assaulted a Yankee in a heated political discussion between the two, whereupon the other man challenged him to a duel. He accepted, and then won the duel, killing the man in the process. Because of this murder, his life was in forfeit to justice and so the couple fled to Saint John, New Brunswick, and thence to the wilderness of the North Shore near present-day Bathurst, where he could settle into obscurity. Sutherland was leased for 999 years at a rate of three peppercorns a year a large tract of land near Caron or Belloni Point. It was there that were born Charlotte and her brother Frederick, four years younger.

== Foreclosure averted ==
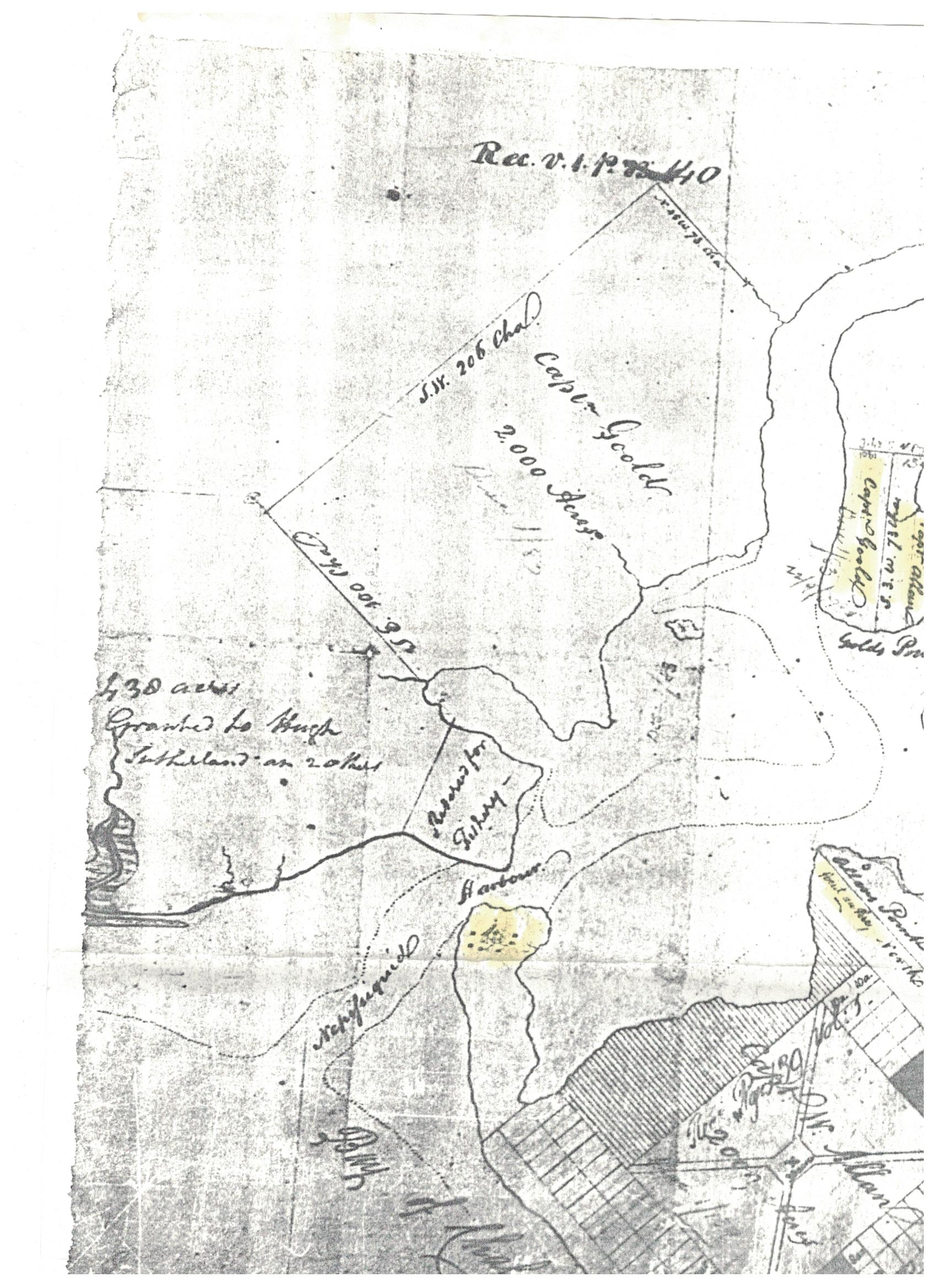
Government survey document indicating 1789 landholdings near Bathurst Harbour (formerly Nepisiguit Harbour) and Baie des Chaleurs New Brunswick. See on left the Hugh Sutherland land grant.

Because of the notions of British freedom particular to the colonial era, the British legal system had resolved to grant land directly to the subjects of the Crown, as compared to the French system of seignories, in which the settlers were subject to overlords. One price of this freedom was that the Crown granted land subject to the condition that it be deforested ploughed and cropped, as opposed to accumulated and hoarded. On information to a magistrate—sometimes by a jealous neighbor—hoarded land might be reclaimed by the Crown.

The Sutherland family appears to have fallen behind on its labour, and somehow was notified in 1818 that a procedure to remove their grant from them had begun. The escheat and re-grant to another depended on a paperchase in Fredericton.

It was thus that Charlotte and her brother were prompted to trek overland to Fredericton, snowshoed and in the midst of winter. They arrived in record time, only eight days after they had started. At the time, there were no houses between the Nepisiguit and the Miramichi, so the siblings were forced to sleep under spruce boughs while in the region. Between Newcastle and Fredericton they occasionally found shelter at farmhouses or at taverns.

The Sutherlands were not without acumen. The deed of grant was vague and failed to stipulate by whom the requisite improvements would be performed; evidently for example, to hire help was allowed. In addition, the deed specified that the land and everything on it belonged to the grantee. Charlotte saw that the beavers, who were considered normally to be nuisances, had in fact deforested the land next to their ponds, and built bridges besides.

Justice and Lieutenant-Governor George Stracey Smyth bent their ears to the strength of this argument, and so the Sutherland grant was saved by the pluck and determination of Charlotte.

== Legacy ==
Charlotte's younger brother Frederick had issue, with wife Mary Ann, of Augustus Skinner on 5 November 1835. It is unknown what happened to James and Charlotte, or the family tract that was leased to James by a Hugh Sutherland, one of the three original landowners of the area that was eventually to become the city of Bathurst.
