= Bathurst Mining Camp =

Mining district in New Brunswick, Canada

Coordinates: 47.450°N 65.832°W

The Bathurst Mining Camp is a mining district in northeast New Brunswick, Canada, centred in the Nepisiguit River valley, and near to Bathurst. The camp hosts 45 known volcanogenic massive sulfide (VMS) deposits typical of the Appalachian Mountains. Some of the ore was smelted at the Belledune facility of Noranda Mines, latterly Xstrata. Although the primary commodity is zinc, the massive-sulphide ore body produces lead, zinc, copper, silver, gold, bismuth, antimony and cadmium.

== History ==
=== 19th century ===
Loring Bailey, the professor of geology at UNB in 1864, wrote that:

I may yet say that in no part of the Province have I been so much pleased with the prospects of mineral wealth and the probability of valuable discoveries as in the eastern portion of Gloucester County ... I have no doubt that the discovery of extensive and valuable metalliferous lodes would be the reward of a thorough and intelligent exploration of this district.

=== Early 20th century ===
The Bathurst Mining Camp was the location of an magnetite-hematite iron mine named Austin Brook, for a time ending early in the 20th century. Austin Brook (the name of a stream) is also known as Drummond Iron Mines, after George Edward Drummond, a businessman who developed the property as part of his iron empire, which would merge in 1908 with another business to form Canada Iron Corporation, latterly Canron.

The Northern New Brunswick and Seaboard Railway (NNB&S) was built from the Intercolonial Railway line near Bathurst approximately 17 miles up the Nepisiguit River to service the mines, but had a short history, terminating in 1918 when it officially ceased operation due to the closure of the iron mine in 1913. The railroad passed into the hands of the provincial government, who were the guarantors of the bonds financing the NNB&S. By 1959 the provincial government had all of the remaining rails lifted.

Austin Brook mine was in receivership for some short time until the Dominion Steel and Coal Company purchased the right to operate it from Canadian Iron Industries, who held the lease. The corporate name is written as Canada Iron Corporation in other documents. The mine was reopened at the height of the Second World War in 1943 by DOSCO to secure a supply of ore for its steel mill in Sydney, Nova Scotia. In late 1942, German U-boats had attacked and sunk ore carriers destined for Sydney from Wabana across the Gulf of the Saint Lawrence in Newfoundland.

=== After WW2 ===
A massive Sulfide orebody was discovered in 1953. James Boylen, Edward Gerald Byrne, Kenneth Colin Irving and NB Premier Louis Robichaud all contributed, each in his own special way, to move the ball down the field over the next decade, until in 1964 production was established at Brunswick Mine.

In 1963 the 14 mile line to Brunswick Mines from Nepisiguit Junction was rebuilt by Canadian National Railways to serve the then-projected zinc mine resulting from the 1953 discovery.

On 9 March 1987, a derailment occurred at Nepisiguit Junction when a runaway CN ore train journeyed from Brunswick Mines to just short of the wye. There was an error in communications with the mine staff and the engineer, Wesley Macdonald, ended up with more cars on his train than he thought, and the older brakes on the lead engine alone were unable to hold the train on the grade in the Brunswick Mines yard. After a harrowing journey at speeds up to 70 mph the engines derailed on the sharp curve into the wye at Nepisiguit Junction. Both units and most of the 30-car train derailed, but the engineer was not seriously injured.

The zinc mine operated continuously since 1964 until April 2013, surviving economic stagnation and four major changes in ownership to produce approximately 150 million tonnes of ore at grades of 8.46% Zn, 3.33% Pb, 0.37% Cu, and 99 g/t Ag.

=== 21st century ===
Because the financial power behind Noranda Mines decided to exit the mining game in 2004, its stake was sold to Xstrata. When Xstrata failed less than a decade later, it was merged with Glencore, who as of 2020 held most of the mineral rights in the Bathurst Mining Camp.

In the early 21st century Blue Note Mines attempted to process ore from the Halfmile Mine, Restigouche Mine, Stratmat Mine, and its headquarters Caribou zinc mine. They were unsuccessful and the property was eventually sold to Trevali, who operated for several years before a tragedy struck at their Burkina Faso operation. The company were unable to recover, and its CEO Ricus Grimbeek resigned in disgrace, over the deaths of eight miners. It was published in 2023 that Grimbeek had a compensation package exceeding $2 million per annum, and that environmental remediation of the Caribou Mine site would cost $49 million. In July 2024 a new company called Bathurst Metallic proposed to the receivership court a sale price of $6.5 million.

The Middle River gold property was bought by Green Panda from a prospector company in September 2023.

== Geology ==
The Geology of the Bathurst Mining Camp (BMC) is a base metal copper, lead and zinc mainly volcanogenic hosted mineral rich area of north central New Brunswick. BMC geology is diverse having experienced considerable tectonic activity from the Ordovician to the Jurassic periods.

Geological activity accumulated sulfide minerals into local vent complex sea floor basalts, creating VHMS volcanogenic hosted massive sulfide and SEDEX sedimentary exhalative deposit depositional environments, which were all later accreted and folded onto the margin of the continental crust which formed the Appalachian Mountains during numerous mountain building events. Additionally the east coast was a highly active regional geological zone experiencing volcanism similar to the Yellowstone along the edge of the Appalachian Mountains of New Brunswick and Maine.

The BMC land area is the grave yards of both the Iapetus and Rheic ocean basins which were subducted under the thicker continental crust and down into the mantle.

The region is mainly known for VHMS and SEDEX environments while it also hosts epithermal, mesothermal and a number of other mineral deposit forming environments. VHMS and SEDEX environments are the primary mineral hosting dynamics producing base and precious metals. Gold and silver are generally low grade associated with zinc and lead rich areas. The gold and silver are present as invisible disseminations within other minerals.

The BMC country rock is also highly intruded by magma plumes. One such plume is on Mount Edward, part of the Notre Dame Mountains, which was exposed by glacial erosion.

=== Faults ===
In 2007 there were commonly held to be four major fault lines in the area. The Miramichi fault was the site on 9 January 1982 of a significant earthquake.

- Rocky Brook-Millstream fault, near the Millstream River and falls
- Heath Steele fault
- Catamaran fault
- Miramichi fault

=== Deposits ===
- Nepisiquit A, B, C
- Camelback
- Halfmile Lake
- Orvan Brook
- Volcanogenic Massive Sulphides

== Mines ==
- Brunswick 12 mine
- Brunswick 6 mine
- Heath Steele Mines
- Wedge Mine
- Chester Mine
- Key Anacon Mine
- Austin Brook Iron Mine
- Murray Brook Mine
- CNE Mine
- Caribou zinc mine
- Stratmat Boundary Mine
- Halfmile mine
- Restigouche

== Bibliography ==
- Luff, William M. (October 1995), "A history of mining in the Bathurst area, northern New Brunswick, Canada", CIM Bulletin, Canadian Institute of Mining and Metallurgy
- McCarthy, Aloysius James (1999). Historic Bathurst on the Bay of Chaleur. Halifax, NS: Nimbus Publishing. ISBN 9781551093031.
