= Wedge Mine =

Copper mine in New Brunswick, Canada

- Location in New Brunswick Wedge Mine (Canada)
- Location: Northumberland County, New Brunswick, Canada; 47°23′46″N 66°07′44″W
- Products: Copper
- Discovered: 1956
- Opened: 1962
- Closed: 1968
- Company: Cominco

The Wedge Mine was a copper mine in the Bathurst Mining Camp of Northeast New Brunswick. It was owned and operated by Cominco on the north bank of the Nepisiguit River. The mine was discovered in 1956 and in operation from 1962 to 1968 producing 1.5 million tonnes of ore. The ore was trucked to, and milled at the Heath Steele Mine. Only the copper rich part of the deposit was mined.

== See also ==
- Volcanogenic massive sulphide ore deposits
- Neil Campbell (geologist)
