= Nepisiguit =

Nepisiguit may refer to the following in New Brunswick, Canada:

- Nepisiguit (electoral district)
- Nepisiguit River
