= Nepisiguit Mi'gmaq Trail =

Hiking trail in New Brunswick, Canada

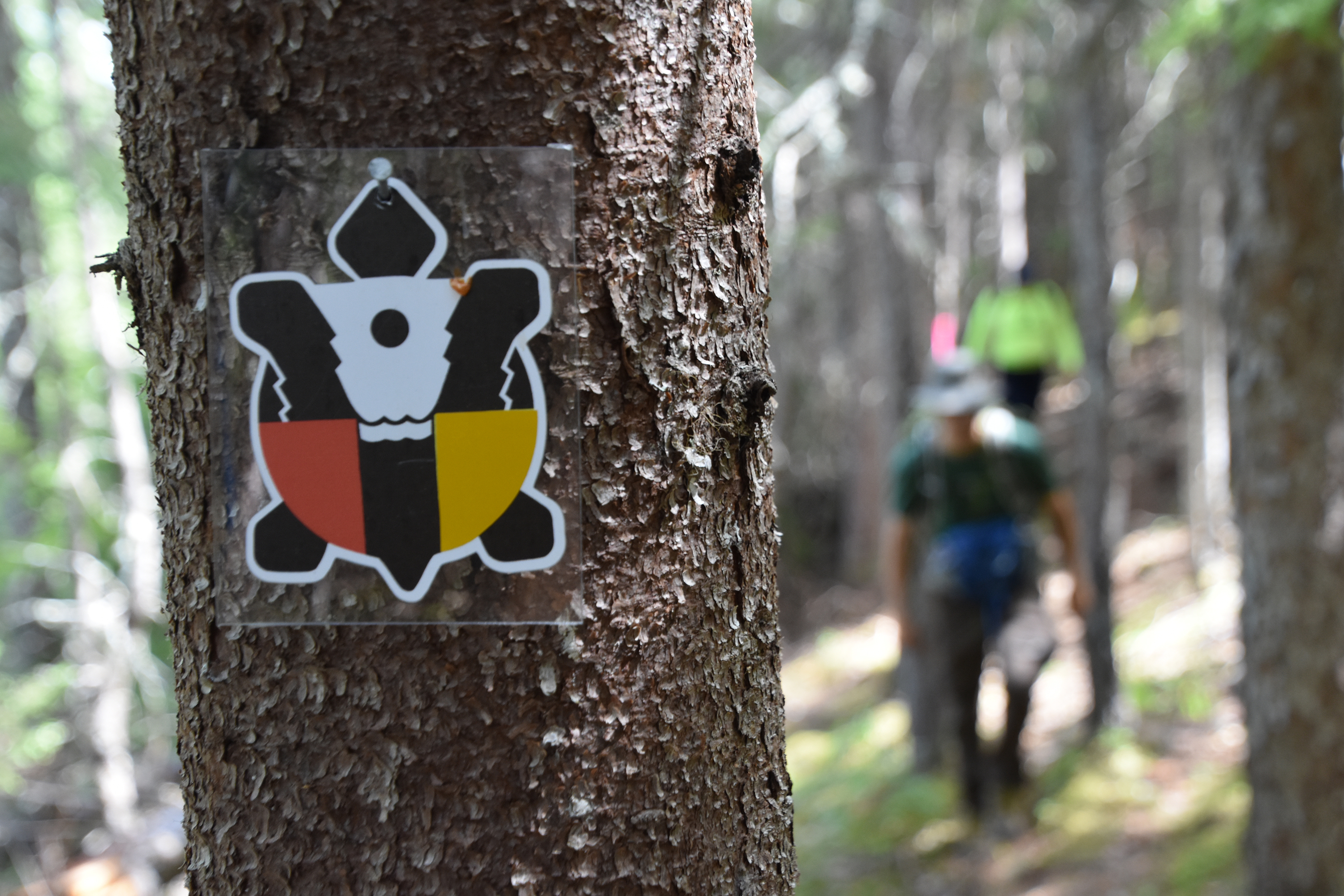
- The distinctive turtle markers of the Sentier Nepisiguit Mi'gmaq Trail.
- Length: 150 kilometres
- Location: New Brunswick, Canada
- Established: 1985
- Completed: 2018
- Trailheads: Daly Point’s Nature Reserve, Mount Carleton Provincial Park
- Use: Hiking
- Elevation change: 306 metres (1,004 ft)
- Highest point: 334 metres
- Lowest point: 12 metres
- Difficulty: moderate-difficult
- Season: June 1 to October 31
- Months: 5
- Website: Sentier Nepisiguit Mi’gmaq Trail official website

The Sentier Nepisiguit Mi'gmaq Trail is a 147 kilometre wilderness hiking and backpacking trail in New Brunswick, Canada that follows the Nepisiguit River from the Daly Point’s Nature Reserve in Bathurst to Mount Carleton Provincial Park. Officially opened for hiking in 2018, the trail is a recommissioned ancient Mi'gmaq portage route and is one of the eleven signature hiking trails in New Brunswick.

== History ==
The Sentier Nepisiguit Mi'gmaq Trail (Oinpegitjoig owteech) has historically been used by local Mi'gmaq people; the first usage is estimated at 5,000 years ago. The trail provided a migration artery to and from the interior of their territory (now most of northern New Brunswick). The Mi’gmaq would spend the summer along the shores of the Bay of Chaleur (Mowebaktabāāk) to fish, hunt and escape the torrents of black flies and other bugs. In autumn, they would pack their camps with preserved supplies, and head back into the interior to set up winter camp in a region sheltered from storms and abundant in caribou and moose for sustenance. The trail was used to carry supplies that could not be hauled up or down the river by canoe, that being their main source of transportation.

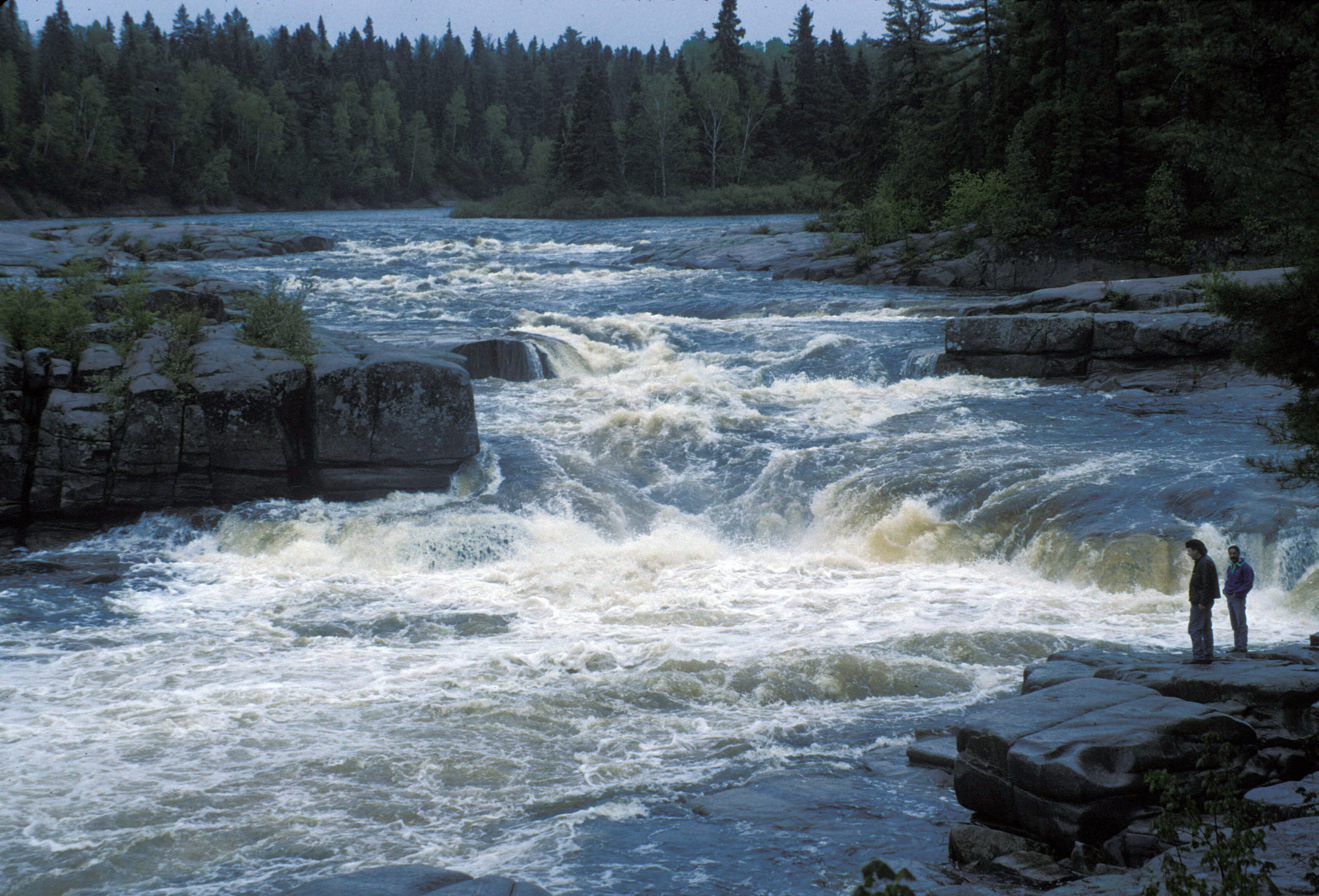
Pabineau Falls on the Nepisiguit River, one of the falls and rapids along the route of the trail

The Mi'gmaq people also used river portages to travel to other parts of the territory. These portages were used to carry supplies and people to other river systems. These river portages are currently being recommissioned by Robert Doyle and Tim Humes of CKNB (Canoe Kayak New Brunswick). These portages were mentioned in some of William F. Ganong’s journals he wrote while exploring the wilderness of New Brunswick.

When the first European explorers, trappers, prospectors and settlers came to this region (the Bay of Chaleur) they also used this convenient route to navigate into the interior of what is now the Province of New Brunswick.

Restoration of the trail started in 1985 as an initiative of the Pabineau First Nation, which flagged and cleared the route from Pabineau Falls to Mount Carleton. In 1997, the trail was opened from Gloucester Junction to Middle Landing, but in the years that followed, trail maintenance lapsed and much of the trail grew over as government priorities shifted. However, in 2015, efforts were renewed to clear the entire route for hiking and camping. Work was largely completed by 2018 and on June 21, 2018, the New Brunswick government designated the new trail as one of the eleven signature trails for the province. as part of the New Brunswick Trails Action Plan due to its historical significance and tourism potential. The official recommissioning of the trail was made on August 27, 2018, at the “Golden Metre” event. The trail has now entered the second phase of construction, consisting of creating an infrastructure construction management plan. The plan will include water crossings, boardwalks, and switchbacks constructed only in crucial areas.

== Name ==
Oinpegitjoig owteech (win-peg-it-joe-ick-owe-tee-je) is literally translated as Nepisiguit Trail. Oinpegitjoig means roughly or evil flowing waters; and Owteech means a path.

== Geography ==
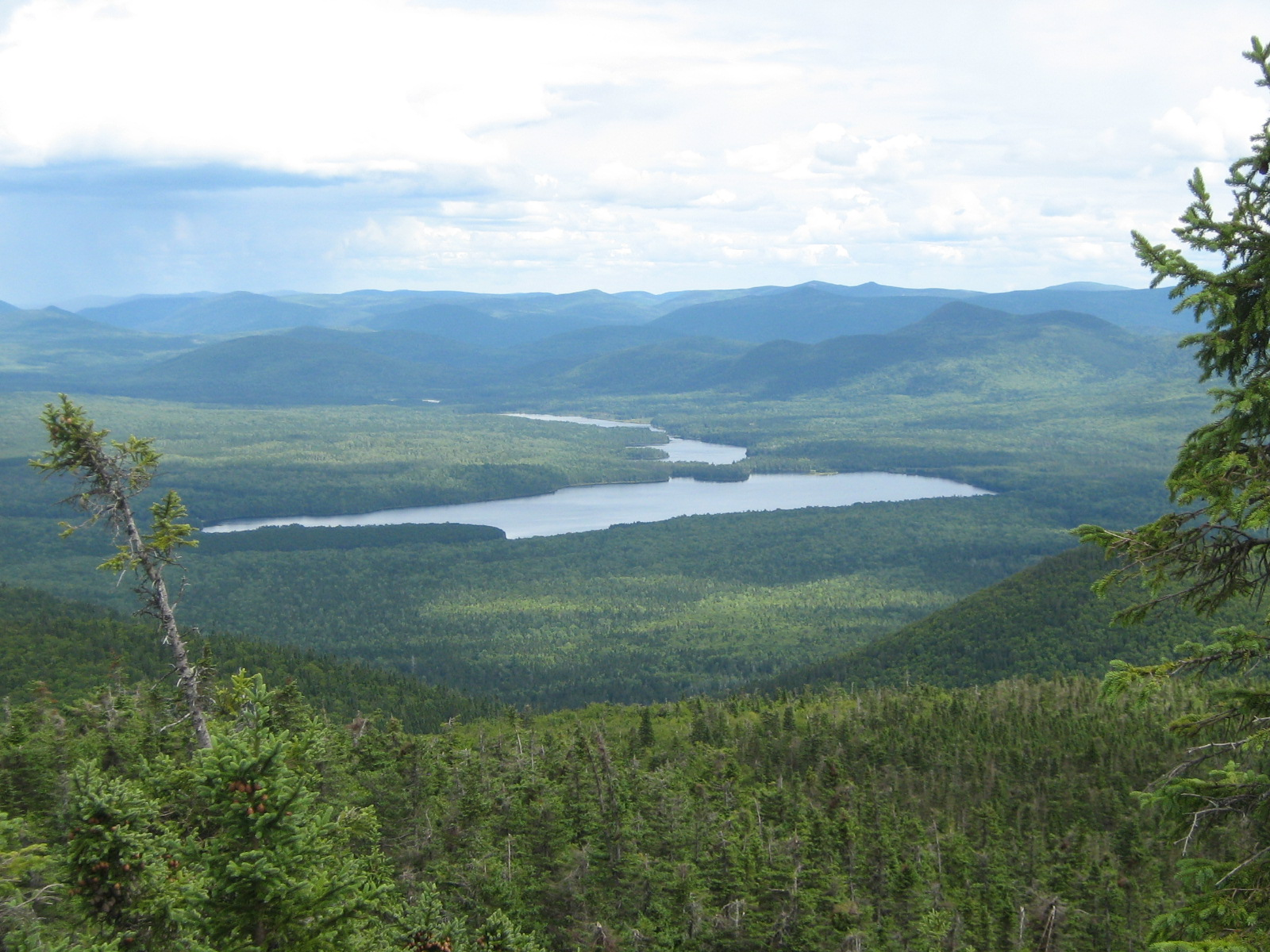
The trail's destination, at the Nepisiguit Lakes in Mount Carleton Provincial Park

The trail follows much of the original portage path along the Nepisiguit River. The route goes from sea level at the mouth of the river in Bathurst Harbour (Gepamgeâg) to Mount Carleton Provincial Park in the headwaters of Bathurst Lake (formerly known as Nepisiguit Lake), where it connects to several trails leading to Mount Carleton, the highest mountain in Canada's Maritime Provinces.

The trail itself is an estimated 147 kilometres with a terrain that varies between mountains, river valleys and a river delta. See maps under the heading maps here. The scenic trail offers breathtaking lookouts, waterfalls and valleys filled with Acadian forests.

== The trail today ==
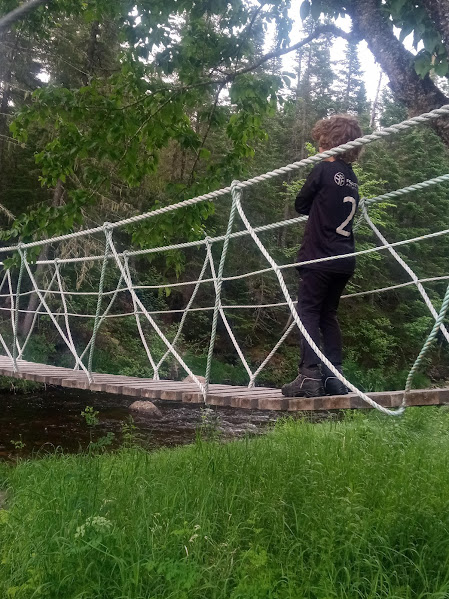
A rope bridge across Otter Creek, at Point N on the trail

Today, the trail is considered a back country hiking trail geographically divided into three specific zones: mountain, river valley, and delta. The trail is divided further into 20 separate sections, labeled from A to U starting at Daly Point Nature Reserve in Bathurst, New Brunswick. The trail begins with Daly Point nature trails and then becomes a Rails to Trails hike on the former line of the Caraquet and Gulf Shore Railway until it joins the old portage route by the Nepisiguit River which comprises most of the route. At the trail’s end in Mount Carleton Provincial Park, it connects to the park’s network of trails leading to Mount Carleton and Mount Sagamook. The trail is operated by the Friends of the Mi’gmaq Trail with a mandate to keep the integrity of the original ancient trail as authentic as possible, but add modern safety components for a safer hiking experience supported by volunteers and sponsors. In 2019 the Sentier Nepisiguit Mi'gmaq Trail legally became incorporated as a not for profit organization. The trail is working on a five year infrastructure management plan that will include the construction of bridges, lookouts and boardwalks.

Some of the key supporters of the Sentier Nepisiguit Mi’gmaq Trail are the Pabineau First Nation, the City of Bathurst, Mount Carleton Provincial Park and the Sentier Verts Chaleur Green Trails who work in association with Sentier NB Trails. While the trail is open to the public, hikers are currently advised to contact trail management if they are planning to hike it.

== Awards and recognition ==
The Sentier Nepisiguit Mi'gmaq Trail was designated by National Geographic as one of the 25 amazing journeys for 2022. This prestigious designation came after the historic trail was discovered and nominated by hiking enthusiasts from across Canada and North America. The news of the designation circulated throughout provincial media as a proud accomplishment within the province of New Brunswick.
