= Neil Campbell (geologist) =

Canadian geologist

Neil Campbell FRSC (April 27, 1914 – July 12, 1978) was a Canadian geologist, and is a notable within the Canadian Mining Hall of Fame.

Campbell was born in Medicine Hat, Alberta and was a 1937 graduate of the University of Alberta's Mining and Metallurgical Engineering program. He sometimes worked for the Geological Survey of Canada during his summer breaks, and in 1935 under the direction of Alfred W. Jolliffe, Campbell mapped the Yellowknife, Northwest Territories area following numerous gold strikes in 1933–1934. Upon his graduation from the University of Alberta, Neil Campbell hired on with Cominco who owned the Con Mine in Yellowknife. He was involved in the exploration department of the company and over his career with Cominco he was responsible for the following developments or discoveries:

1. In 1943, he began research that identified the West Bay Fault in Yellowknife as having faulted the massive ore bodies at the Giant Mine beneath the Con Mine. This new gold deposit, now called the Campbell Shear Zone, brought new life into the Con Mine.
2. He developed theories about the geological nature of the lead and zinc orebodies at Pine Point, on the south shore of Great Slave Lake, Northwest Territories. As a result, Cominco authorized large scale exploration that by 1954 had outlined a huge deposit. Pine Point went into production in 1964.
3. He supervised the exploration that led to the Wedge copper mine in New Brunswick, the Magmont lead and zinc mine in Missouri, and potash mines in Saskatchewan.

Neil Campbell was awarded the CIMM (Canadian Institute of Mining and Metallurgy) Barlow Memorial Award in 1947 and was elected Fellow of the Royal Society of Canada in 1953. He left Cominco in 1965 to become chief geologist of a Spokane mining company, and then 1967 pursued a career as world traveling consulting geologist. In 1970, he received an honorary doctorate from the University of Alberta for his lifetime achievements. He died in 1978 in Spokane, Washington.
