= North Zone mine =

Tin mine in New Brunswick, Canada

- Location: New Brunswick, Canada
- Products: tin, zinc, indium
- Company: Adex Mining

The North Zone mine is a large open pit mine located in the eastern part of Canada in York County, New Brunswick. North Zone represents one of the largest tin reserves in Canada having estimated reserves of 15.2 million tonnes of ore grading 0.38% tin, 0.86% zinc and 0.006% indium. The mine produces around 3,200 tonnes of tin/year, 40 tonnes of indium/year and 4,000 tonnes of zinc/year.

== See also ==
- List of mines in New Brunswick
