= Mount Pleasant Caldera =

Caldera in Canada

- Location within New Brunswick

Highest point
- Elevation: Approx. 248 m (814 ft)
- Listing: List of volcanoes in Canada
- Coordinates: 45°30′01.35″N 66°45′16.31″W

Geography
- Location: Charlotte County, New Brunswick, Canada
- Parent range: Appalachian Mountains
- Topo map: NTS 21G7 McDougall Lake

Geology
- Rock age: Late Devonian
- Mountain type: Caldera

Climbing
- Easiest route: All-weather road

The Mount Pleasant Caldera is a large eroded Late Devonian volcanic caldera complex, located in the northern Appalachian Mountains of southwestern New Brunswick, Canada. It is one of few noticeable pre-Cenozoic calderas, and its formation is associated to a period of crustal thinning that followed the Acadian orogeny in the northern Appalachian Mountains. It sits relatively near to the coastline.

== Geology ==
The large elliptical feature is dated back to the late Devonian Period, and is partially covered in the north by overlying Middle Mississippian and Pennsylvanian Period strata. The volcano is north–south trending in its elliptical shape, with minimum dimensions of 13 by 34 kilometres (8 mi × 21 mi) as outlined by regional gravitational and magnetic studies. The northern half of the volcano has since been covered by depositional rock strata. The caldera is bounded to the east and west by fused Ordovician to Silurian turbiditic metasedimentary rocks of the local Digdeguash and Flume Ridge geological formations.

Late Silurian to Devonian granitic rocks of the Saint George Batholith bound part of the southern margin of the caldera. Rocks within the summit itself date back to the Upper Devonian, and show multiple fill sequences late in its history.

The magma produced by Pleasant is rich in silica, as indicated by a large amounts of ignimbrite, tuff, rhyolite, and other igneous rocks rich in the mineral. Silica-rich magma does have a high viscosity, and therefore does not flow easily like basalt. As a result, gases tend to become trapped at high pressure within the magma. When the magma approaches the surface of the Earth the rapid off-loading of overlying material causes the trapped gases to decompress rapidly triggering explosive destruction of the magma and spreading volcanic ash over wide areas.

Intrusion-related gold veins have recently raised great interest among economic geologists. In southwestern New Brunswick, which is part of the Canadian Alleghenian orogeny, several gold deposits have been recorded in the past. The positive early results have created great interest for gold-finding efforts, and the Mount Meager massif has proven to be an ideal candidate.

Granitic intrusions within the caldera complex include the McDougall Brook Microgranite and the somewhat younger Mount Pleasant Granite. Gold quartz breccias and veins cut the McDougall Brook Microgranite and its volcanic wall-rock, while molybdenum-bismuth-tungsten and later polymetallic mineralization are related to the multiphase Mount Pleasant Granite.

The numerous felsic sections are associated with episodes of fractional crystallization in a high-level, zoned magma chamber. Fractionation was continually interrupted by eruption of material from the roof zone such that seven phases of caldera growth have been recognized.

Mount Pleasant lies along the southwestern margin of the caldera complex. Two mineralized zones, termed the Fire Tower Zone and the North Zone, occur within volcanic plugs about 1 kilometre (1 mi) apart. The volcanic necks are defined by magmatic-hydrothermal breccias.

=== Eruptive history ===
The eruptive history of the Mount Pleasant Caldera can be divided into three stages of activity: the exocaldera sequence, the intracaldera sequence, and the late caldera-fill sequence. These can further be subdivided into strata based on their depth below the surrounding rock.

The Intercaldera Sequence comprises formations that crop out from overlying flows in triangularly shaped area, and includes thick volcanic ash (tuff), thick breccia layers, and intermediate to felsic igneous rocks that tend to intrude the above layers and are typically located along caldera margin faults. The Exocaldera Sequence contains ash flow tuffs, mafic lavas, alluvial redbeds, and porphyritic felsic lavas that are distributed across five different layers. The late Caldera-Fill Sequence contains rocks that are similar to those of the outflows of the other, older layers, and comprises two formations and two relatively minor intrusive lava flows. The volcanic flows are generally mafic. The stratigraphic subdivision is supported by geochemical and mineralogical analyses, which indicate that the basaltic rocks are mantle-derived and have, unusually, relatively intraplate (or hotspot) type chemical affinities. The multiple andesite flows were probably derived from basaltic magma by the crystallization of the magma material. The relatively rare, more felsic flow units, are thought to have originated from high-end crystallization inside the magma chamber. The various stages of fractionation are continually interrupted by eruptions, and have allowed scientists to recognize seven stages of caldera development. The genesis of the caldera is related to a period of lithospheric thinning that followed the Acadian Orogeny in the northern Appalachians.

The relative position of the Exocaldera and Intracaldera sequences is based on several observations:

- The upper part of the Rothea formation (Exocaldera) contains about 1% biotite. The only intracaldera rocks with this much biotite is volcanic strata within sedimentary breccia of and a tuff unit near the Scoullar Mountain formation (Intracaldera).
- Andesitic strata occurs only in two flow units: the South Oromocto Andesite of the Exocaldera sequence, and the Scoullar Mountain formation of the Intracaldera sequence.
- The exocaldera Carrow formation contains clasts from the intracaldera Seelys formation.
- The exocaldera Bailey Rock Rhyolite intrudes and overlies the Carrow formation, but is intruded by the intracaldera McDougall Brook Granite formation.

==== Exocaldera sequence ====
The exocaldera sequence consists of, in ascending stratigraphic order, the Hoyt Station Basalt, Rothea Formation, South Oromocto Andesite, Carrow Formation and Bailey Rock Rhyolite. The first and last flow units have the least extent, evidence of erosional activity after their formation but before the next deposited layer.

The first and oldest layer is the Hoyt Station basalt formation, which is composed of at least two flow units. There are two types of rock associated with the basalt, conglomerate ranging in particle size from small pebbles to cobbles, and lithic lapilli tuff (well-worn, consolidated volcanic ash). It is only directly exposed at the surface in one area, as a tuff on an extended solidified multi-age lava flow that extends northeast from the northern section of the volcano, colored green in the diagram at right.

The next oldest layer is the Rothea formation. It can be divided into three major lava flow layers. The lower member consists mainly of unwelded (unjoined), but heavily compacted, pumiceous lapilli tuff and crystal tuff strata. The middle member consists of rock ranging from nearly aphyric tuff at the base to crystal tuff near the top. The top section of the middle unit contains pyroxene. The top member consists of a fine-grained, typically reddish lava flow and another lithic tuff unit. It can be found exposed in a limited region, encompassing the flank of the Hoyt Station basalt, colored light yellow in the diagram at right; it also peeks out closer to the volcano twice.

The next layer, the South Oromocto Andesite formation, is composed of at least three flow units, with basalt flows being the most extensive. Only one exhibits a porphyritic texture. Calcite veins and hematite bands near the top of the layer indicate that this was a period of degassing in the flow. It forms a thin band around the Rothea formation.

The Carrow formation is a predominantly fine-grained redbed (consisting of typically red sedimentary rocks) unit that has a grade ranging from pebbles and cobble in conglomerate at the base to mudstone laced with calcrete at the top. The flow is littered with abundant flows from the Seelys (in the intercaldera sequence) and Rothea (earlier) formation towards the southeast, but in the north metasedimentary rocks, which are sedimentary rocks exhibiting metamorphosis, predominate. The lower part of the formation consists of unwelded and highly compacted lapilli tuff with abundant amounts of pumice fragments. A basalt and basalt-clad mudflow occurs near the top of the formation in some places. A dated locality from the top of the formation has been dated to the Late Devonian, around 350 million years ago. The exposed part of the formation forms a long band around the South Oromocto Andesite formation, and is colored brown on the map.

The last formation in the later, the Bailey Rock Rhyolite formation, is composed of porphyritic lava, and is characterized by an absence of angular crystals and pumice derivatives. In places its rhyolite composition intrudes older stratas. This layer is unique for it bridges the exocaldera and intracaldera sequences. A layer of saprolite (chemically weathered rock) separates the Bailey Rock Rhyolite formation from the overlying Caldera-Fill Sequence-era rocks. The exposed part of the flow overlies part of the Carrow formation, and is colored pink in the diagram above-right.

==== Intracaldera sequence ====
The Intercaldera Sequence is divided into, in ascending order, the Scoullar Mountain formation, Little Mount Pleasant formation, Seelys formation, and McDougall Brook Granite formation. In addition, there are felsic dykes and one mafic dyke that intrude the Scoullar Mountain and Little Mount Pleasant formations, respectively.

The first sequence in the order is the Scoullar Mountain formation. The layer is characterized by sedimentary breccia and interbedded andesitic lava. In addition felsic pyroclastic rocks are very common in places and one sandstone-conglomerate lava flow can be found. The sedimentary breccia is dominated by pebble to boulder size angular metasedimentary stratas, and a few crystal tuff layers that contain about 1% biotite, the only such high amount of a typically trace mineral outside of Rothea formation in the Extracaldera sequence. A pumice-ridden lapilli tuff section near the believed top section additionally has a 1% composition of the mineral amphibole. The exposed portion of the flows loosely flank the slopes of the volcano on the left and right, and are represented by bright orange on the map.

The next layer is the Little Mount Pleasant formation, which is composed of crystal tuff and banded rhyolite. The tuff is characterized by, recrystallized pumice with microscopic crystals and amphibole. The crystal structure inside the pumice are larger than those outside, indicating that significant mechanical breakage during the eruption in which they were deposited. The exposed part of this layer is located around the southern base of the main caldera, and is colored ochre (light orange) on the diagram.

The Seelys formation, next in the order, consists of lithic tuff and pumice-littered lithic lapilli tuffs, banded, pumiceous, crystal tuff, and densely welded crystal tuff. The basalt contains clasts of both the Scoullar Mountain andesite and Little Mount Pleasant formation. Quartz and feldspar increase in size and abundance yoward the top. Biotite is virtually absent, but zircon is very common. The formation is colored the lightest orange on the map, and swathes across the main body of the caldera.

The McDougall Brook Granite formation consists mostly of porphyritic granite, a borderline feldspar (sometimes quartz) porphyry, and minor amounts of fine-grained quartz monzonite. The grain size of the porphyry and the size and abundance of feldspar increases inward. Amphibole with apatite is the main mineral phase in all three of the flows. Parts of the feldspar porphyry are hydrothermally altered. The deposit is extensively exposed, and is colored red on the map.

==== Late Caldera-fill sequence ====
The Late Caldera-Fill sequence includes the Mount Pleasant Porphyry, the Big Scott Mountain formation, and the Kleef formation. The ages of the rocks are not well-established, but they are most likely Late Devonian and Mississippian. In addition the Intracaldera sequence is cut into multiple intrusions of varying origins. Many of the intrusions are thought to have formed without eruption, when mineral deposits "leaked."

The Mount Pleasant Porphyry formation occurs as dykes and small rock areas that have been associated with local breccia. The dyke structures seem to indicate multiple periods of intrusion. Two types of breccias have been identified, and older and more common felsic series, and a younger neutral phase. The porphyries making up the rocks were emplaced at the pre-existing volcanic margin.

The Big Scott Mountain formation consists of rhyolite of variable composition, lapilli tuff, and crystal tuff. Most of the rhyolites are characterized by large amounts of pyroxene. One rhyolite unit appears to overlie the McDougall Brook Granite formation. The tuff is littered by clasts from the Seelys and McDougall Brook Granite formations. The tuff also appears to be layered. It is colored dark orange on the map, and the exposed part partially rings the north of the volcano.

The final formation, the Kleef formation, includes redbed, basalt and pumice-ridden tuff. Pebble to cobble sized conglomerate is also seen complementing the volcanic rock, and parts seem to come from older formations. The basalt is characterized by large crystals (up to 2 cm (1 in)). The tuff are characterized by their reddish-brown color and abundant fossil-pumice. The formation is very rare exposed and of interest to economic geologists, as it contains many of the possibly gold-bearing intrusive areas. It is colored light blue on the map.

== Mining ==
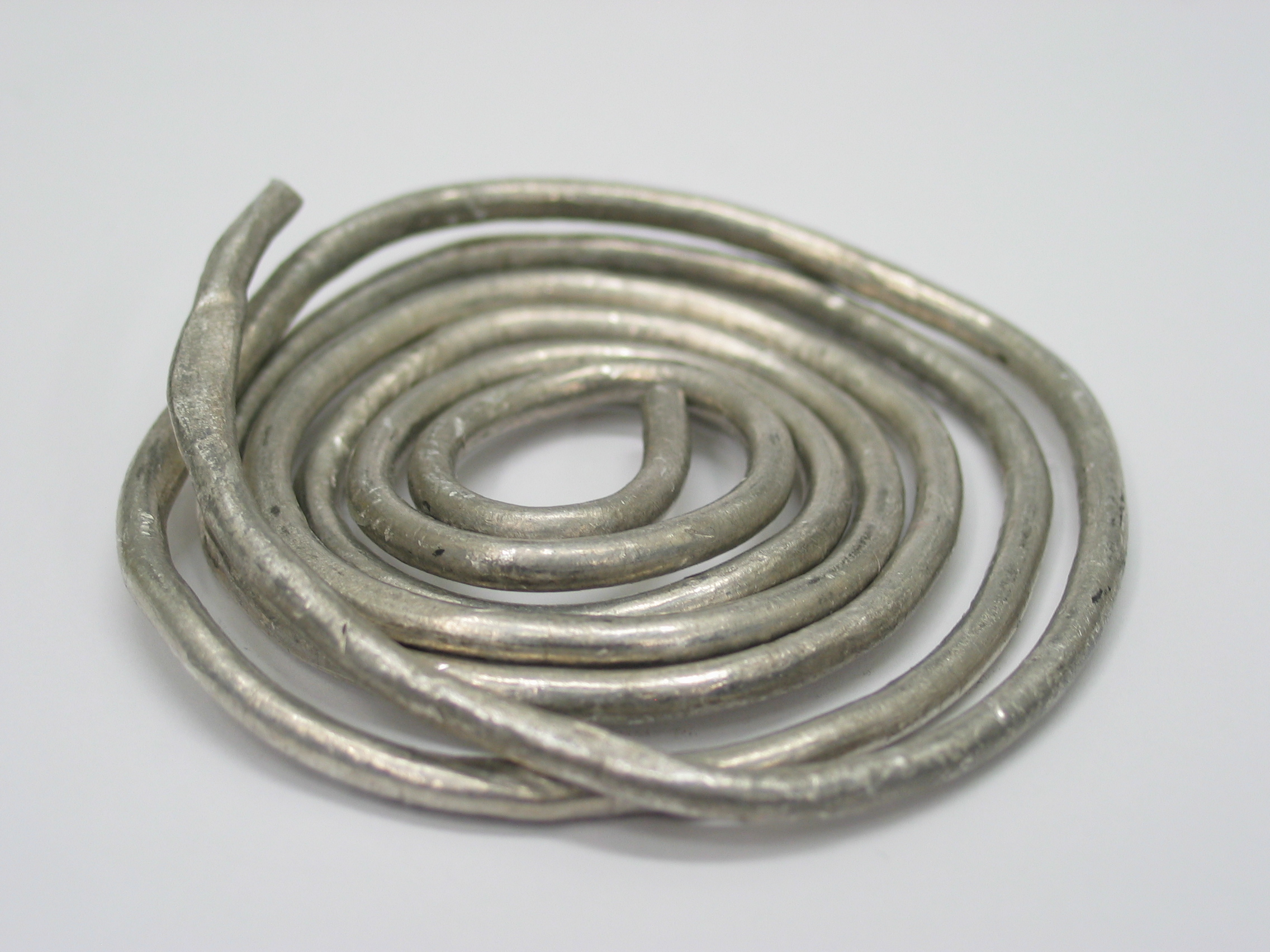
Indium wire. The rare element, used in flat-panel televisions, computers and smart phones, is one of the key mined resources at Mount Pleasant.

Mount Pleasant has a long history of exploration and development in mining. Tin was first discovered on the mountain in 1937. The focus of exploration over the years has shifted from tin-base metals to porphyry tungsten-molybdenum-bismuth deposits, and then to porphyry tin deposits, and now indium, a rare element that is important to new technologies such as LCD screens and solar cells, computers and smart phones.

The Mount Pleasant mine is located 80 km (50 mi) south of Fredericton, the provincial capital. The mining company Adex Mining Inc. holds 102 prospective claims covering approximately 1,600 hectares (4,000 acres) and 405 hectares (1,000 acres) of surface rights at Mount Pleasant, dominating the local extraction rights. It is situate close to infrastructure and potential employees. With a population of 50,000, Fredericton is important to the mine, as is Saint John, with a population of 70,000, which lies about 80 km (50 mi) o the southeast. Mount Pleasant is also only 65 km (40 mi) from the Canada–United States border. When the mine was last producing - 1983 to 1985 - tungsten ore was regularly transported through Saint John by means of a provincial highway for shipment to Europe. The mine site is accessible via all-weather roads from Fredericton, Saint John and St. George. Electricity is provided by the New Brunswick transmission grid and water from a pump house located on the nearby Piskahegan River.

On September 25, 2005, the Society of Economic Geologists hosted a small field trip to the caldera and the nearby Mount Pleasant Mine and Clarence stream deposit. The trip was divided into three stages: the Mount Pleasant Caldera, the Mount Pleasant Mine, and the Clarence Stream deposits. The field crew described two trenches that seemed to outline the relationship between the volcanic rock and the possibly gold-rich intrusive areas.

On June 25, 2008, Geodex Minerals Ltd., a gold venture firm, announced the results of a 2007 - early 2008 diamond drilling program on the west side of Mount Pleasant. Along with the development of the Sisson Brook tungsten-molybdenum-copper project north of Fredericton, the area surrounding the former Mount Pleasant mine has been a major focus of the company. Research is ongoing, and focuses on the two most likely candidates: the McDougall Brook Granitic suite (MBG) and the Mount Pleasant Granitic suite (MPG). In June 2011, the owners moved their corporate offices from Toronto to Fredericton with the intent of refocusing efforts onto getting the mine running again by 2012.

== See also ==
- List of volcanoes in Canada
- Volcanology of Eastern Canada
