= New Brunswick Route 435 =

Highway in New Brunswick, Canada

Coordinates: 47.016429°N 65.736523°W

Route 435

Route information
- Maintained by New Brunswick Department of Transportation

Major junctions
- North end: Route 430 in Chaplin Island Road
- South end: Route 425 in Whitney

Location
- Country: Canada
- Province: New Brunswick

Highway system
- Provincial highways in New Brunswick; Former routes
← Route 430	→ Route 440

Route 435 is a 10-kilometre (6.2 mi) long mostly North–South secondary highway in the northwest portion of New Brunswick, Canada.

The route's southern terminus starts at the northern bank of the Miramichi River on Route 425 in the community of Whitney. The road continues north through a mostly treed area before taking a sharp east turn where it passes through the community of Maple Glen. The road then continues north again through a mostly treed area ending at the intersection near the community of Chaplin Island Road.

== Intersecting routes ==
- None
