= Mount Carleton Provincial Park =

Provincial park of New Brunswick, Canada

Mount Carleton Provincial Park _{Parc provincial du Mont-Carlton (French)}
- IUCN category II (national park)
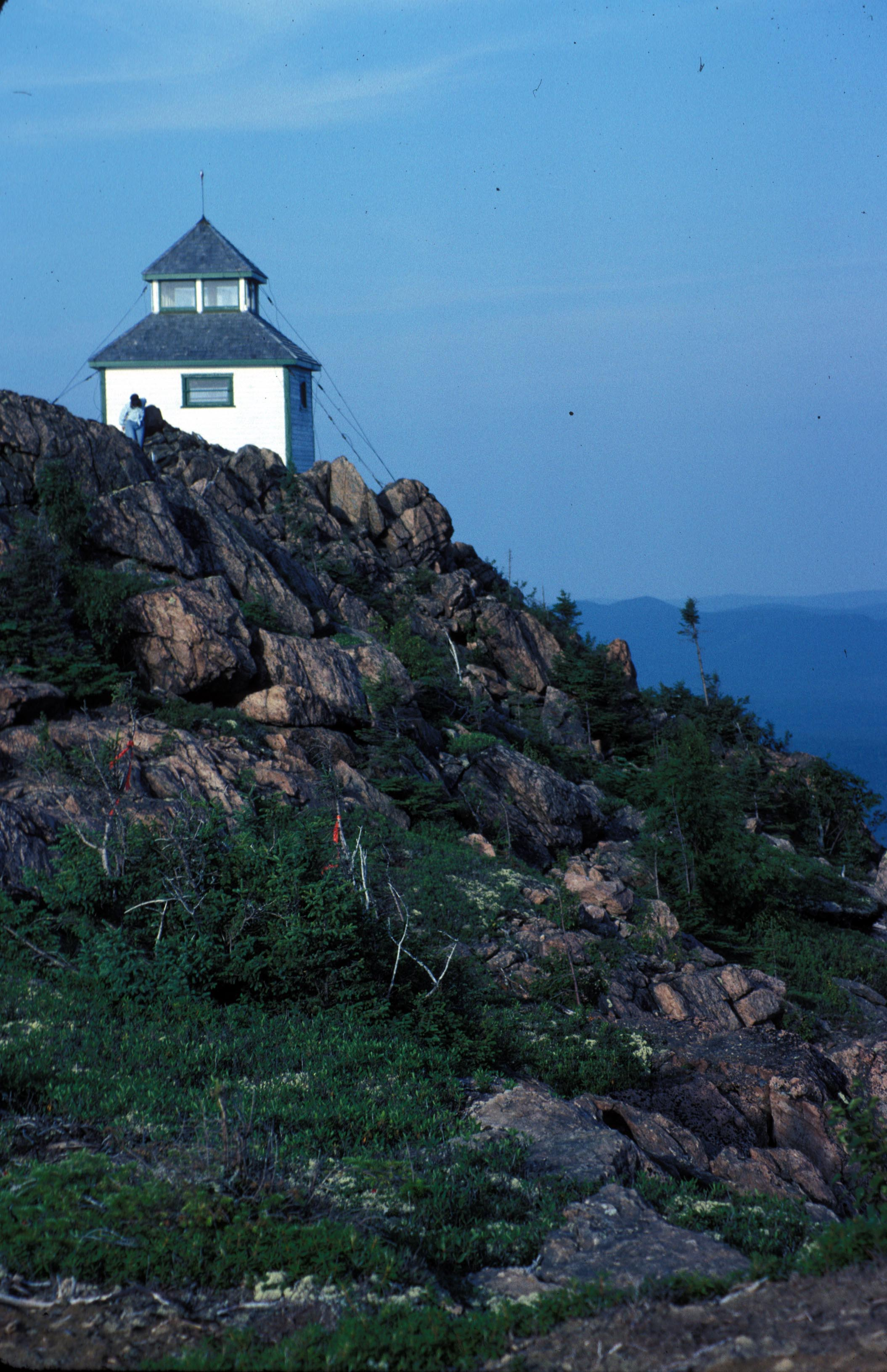
- Fire-spotting hut on Mount Carleton
- Interactive map of Mount Carleton Provincial Park _{Parc provincial du Mont-Carlton (French)}
- Location: Mount Carleton, New Brunswick, Canada
- Nearest city: Saint-Quentin
- Coordinates: 47°22′42″N 66°52′30″W
- Area: 174 square kilometres (67 sq mi)
- Established: 1970 (provincial park as of 2008)
- Visitors: 26,373 (in 2009)
- Governing body: Government of New Brunswick

Mount Carleton Provincial Park, established in 1970, is the largest provincial park in the Province of New Brunswick, Canada. It encompasses 174 square kilometres (67 sq mi) in the remote highlands of north-central New Brunswick. It has been called the "Algonquin of New Brunswick".

== History ==
Mount Carleton is near the shores of Nictau Lake, where First Nations artifacts have been found that date back to thousands of years. The Mount Carleton Provincial Park was established in 1969 and has always prohibited logging activities, which has allowed the surrounding forest to have extensive biodiversity.

In 2009, the park was officially designated as a Dark Sky Preserve on behalf of Parks Canada and the Royal Astronomy Society of Canada. This designation aims to keep the area free from light pollution.

== Geography ==
The park's dominant natural features include the highest peak in the Maritimes, Mount Carleton, and several large freshwater lakes (Nictau Lake, Little Nictau Lake, Bathurst Lake, and the Nepisiguit Lakes). Located at the headwaters of the Nepisiguit River and the Tobique River, the lakes offered a convenient portage route between the Nepisiguit and Saint John River watersheds. The Canadian portion of the International Appalachian Trail passes through the park. The Nepisiguit Mi'gmaq Trail, a wilderness backpacking trail which follows the Nepisguit river to Bathurst, has its western terminus at Bathurst Lake in the park.

The mountains in the park are erosional remnants of resistant igneous rocks that remained after an ancient Mesozoic peneplain surface was uplifted in the Cenozoic to form a plateau, and subsequently dissected via millions of years of erosion by wind, water and glacial ice.

== Features ==
Mount Carleton Provincial Park has 11 hiking trails and four main mountain peaks, each accessible by trail: Mount Carleton, 820m (2,690 ft); Mount Head, 792m (2,589 ft); Mount Sagamook, 777m (2,549 ft); and Mount Bailey, 564m (1,850 ft).

== See also ==
- List of New Brunswick parks
