= Caribou Mines, Nova Scotia =

Community in Nova Scotia, Canada

Coordinates: 45°3′25.9″N 62°56′29.8″W

Caribou Mines in Nova Scotia

Caribou Mines is a rural community of the Halifax Regional Municipality in the Canadian province of Nova Scotia. The Icelandic settlement Markland was located in Caribou Mines from 1875 to 1882.
