= Brunswick 6 mine =

Mine in New Brunswick, Canada

Brunswick #6
- Location in New Brunswick
- Location: Gloucester County, New Brunswick, Canada; 47°24′32″N 65°49′05″W
- Products: Lead, zinc, copper
- Production: 12.197 M tonnes
- Discovered: 1952
- Opened: 1966
- Closed: 1983
- Company: Brunswick Mining and Smelting Company

The Brunswick #6 mine is a copper-lead-zinc mine in the Bathurst Mining Camp of northern New Brunswick, Canada. It was discovered in October, 1952 and was in production from 1966 until 1983. The Brunswick #6 orebody was the first major sulfide deposit discovered in the Bathurst area. The mine operated as an open-pit operation until 1977 when a ramp was driven from the bottom of the pit to access deeper ore.

== Geology ==
The Brunswick #6 deposit is a volcanogenic massive sulfide (VMS) deposit rich in lead, zinc, and copper.
