= Adex Mining =

Canadian mining company

Adex Mining Inc.
- Type: Public (TSX-V: ADE)
- Industry: Mining
- Headquarters: Toronto, Canada
- Key people: Yan Kim Po, Chairman, Interim President and CEO, and Director
- Website: adexmining.com

Adex Mining Inc. is a Toronto, Ontario, Canada-based mining exploration company engaged in the development of its wholly owned Mount Pleasant Mine property in Charlotte County, New Brunswick, Canada. According to the Government of Canada report, Mount Pleasant is "North America's largest tin deposit and the world's largest reserve of indium." The company's stock trades on the TSX Venture Exchange under the symbol ADE.

Adex holds 102 mineral claims at Mount Pleasant covering approximately 1,600 hectares (4,000 acres), as well as 405 hectares (1,000 acres) of surface rights. Mount Pleasant's Fire Tower Zone contains tungsten-molybdenum mineralization, and is the site of a past-producing tungsten mine operated by Billiton from 1983 to 1985. The property's North Zone is the focus of tin, indium and zinc exploration.

== Tin-Indium-Zinc at North Zone ==
Successive historical exploration drilling programs by previous owners of Mount Pleasant began the process of defining the property's tin and indium mineralization centred on the North and Deep Tin zones.

Adex acquired Mount Pleasant in 1995 and began conducting exploration and metallurgical tests on the tin-indium areas. In 1997, the property was placed in care and maintenance due to poor economic conditions in the mining industry.

The tin-indium-zinc North Zone contains a National Instrument 43-101-compliant resource estimate of 10,882,000 tonnes in the "indicated" category at 0.43% tin, 67.8 grams per tonne indium, and 0.67% zinc, as well as 7,603,000 tonnes in the "inferred" category at 0.22% tin, 74.6 grams per tonne indium and 0.99% zinc.

== Tungsten-Molybdenum at Fire Tower Zone ==
In the early 1980s, Billiton invested approximately $150 million for the construction of a tungsten mine and mill at Mount Pleasant's Fire Tower Zone.

The facility was active from 1983 to 1985, milling 990,200 tonnes of tungsten ore at a grade of 0.35%. Challenging economic conditions and a downturn in the price of tungsten led to the mine's closure in 1985.

Surface facilities from the mine (including storage areas, conveyor galleries, warehouse space and office space) remain intact on the property.

The Fire Tower Zone contains a National Instrument 43-101-compliant resource of 13,489,000 tonnes in the "indicated" category at 0.33% tungsten and 0.21% molybdenum, as well as 841,700 tonnes in the "inferred" category at 0.26% tungsten and 0.20% molybdenum.

== Recent activities ==
In the summer of 2007, Adex reactivated the Mount Pleasant project. Subsequently, the company launched a number of programs designed to move the project towards the definitive feasibility study and mine activation phases.

Work to date has focused on both the tin-indium-zinc and tungsten-molybdenum zones on the property and has included exploration drilling, a 43-101 resource estimate on the North Zone and the Fire Tower Zone, upgrading of tailings impoundment structures and other activities.

== Geology ==
The Mount Pleasant deposits are located in southern New Brunswick within the Appalachian Orogen. These deposits occur within gently dipping Late Devonian age volcanic and sedimentary rocks that are the remnants of a large epicontinental caldera complex.

The regional geology in the mine area is dominated by the Mount Pleasant Caldera, the exposed part of which measures approximately 13 by 17 kilometres. Multiple layered granitic intrusive rocks and associated mineralization at Mount Pleasant were emplaced along the southwestern margin of the caldera complex. This structure occurs within the northern extension of the Appalachian geosynclinals belt and is situated on the southeast flank of New Brunswick's Central Basin.
