= Mount Carleton =

Mountain in New Brunswick, Canada

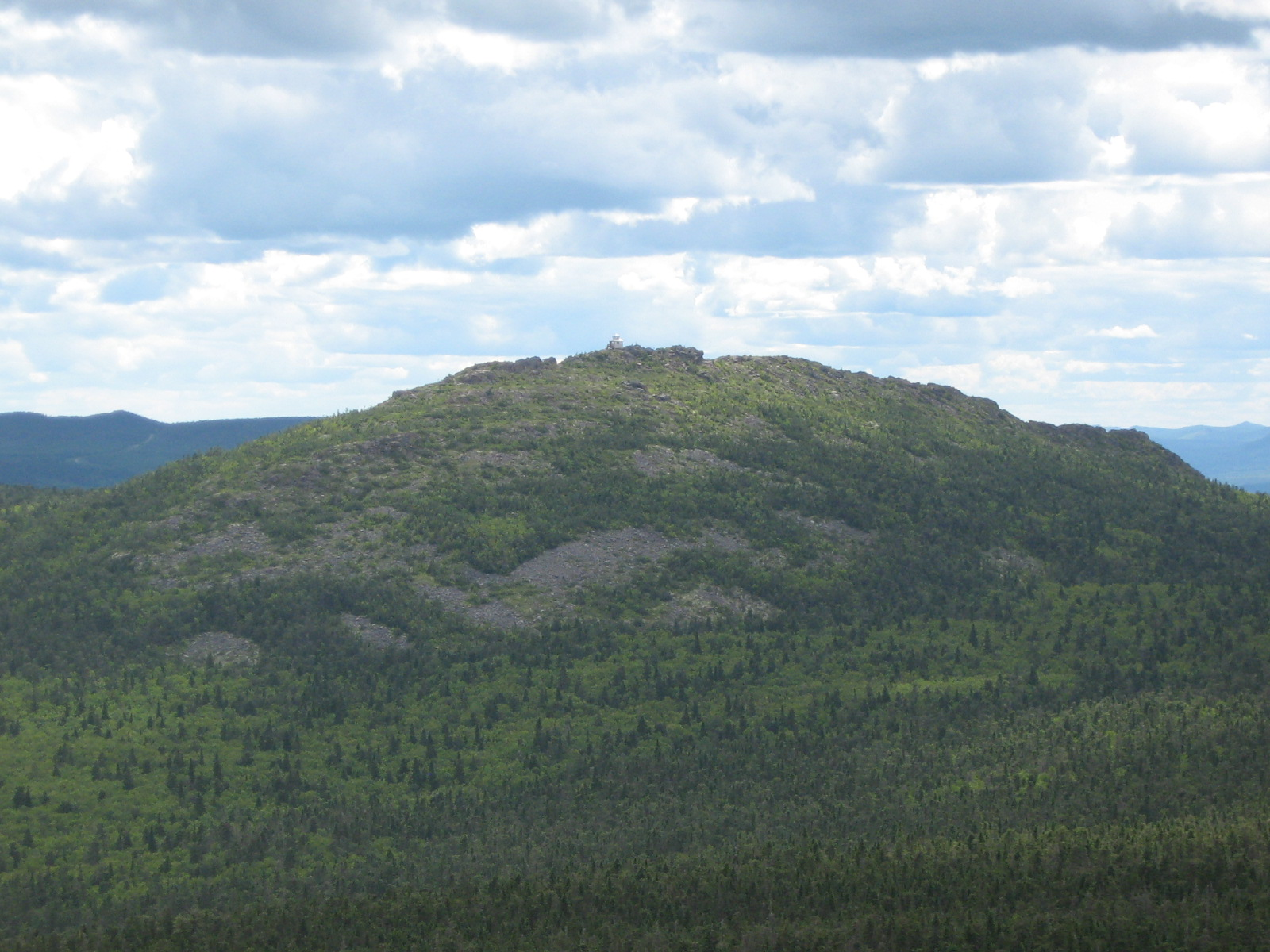
- View of Mount Carleton from Mount Head

Highest point
- Elevation: 820 m (2,690 ft)
- Prominence: 625 m (2,051 ft)
- Listing: Canada most isolated peaks 45th; Canadian Subnational High Points 10th
- Coordinates: 47°22′41″N 66°52′33″W

Geography
- Location within New Brunswick
- Location: Northumberland County, New Brunswick, Canada
- Parent range: Appalachian Mountains
- Topo map: NTS 21O7 Nepisiguit Lakes

Climbing
- Easiest route: Hike

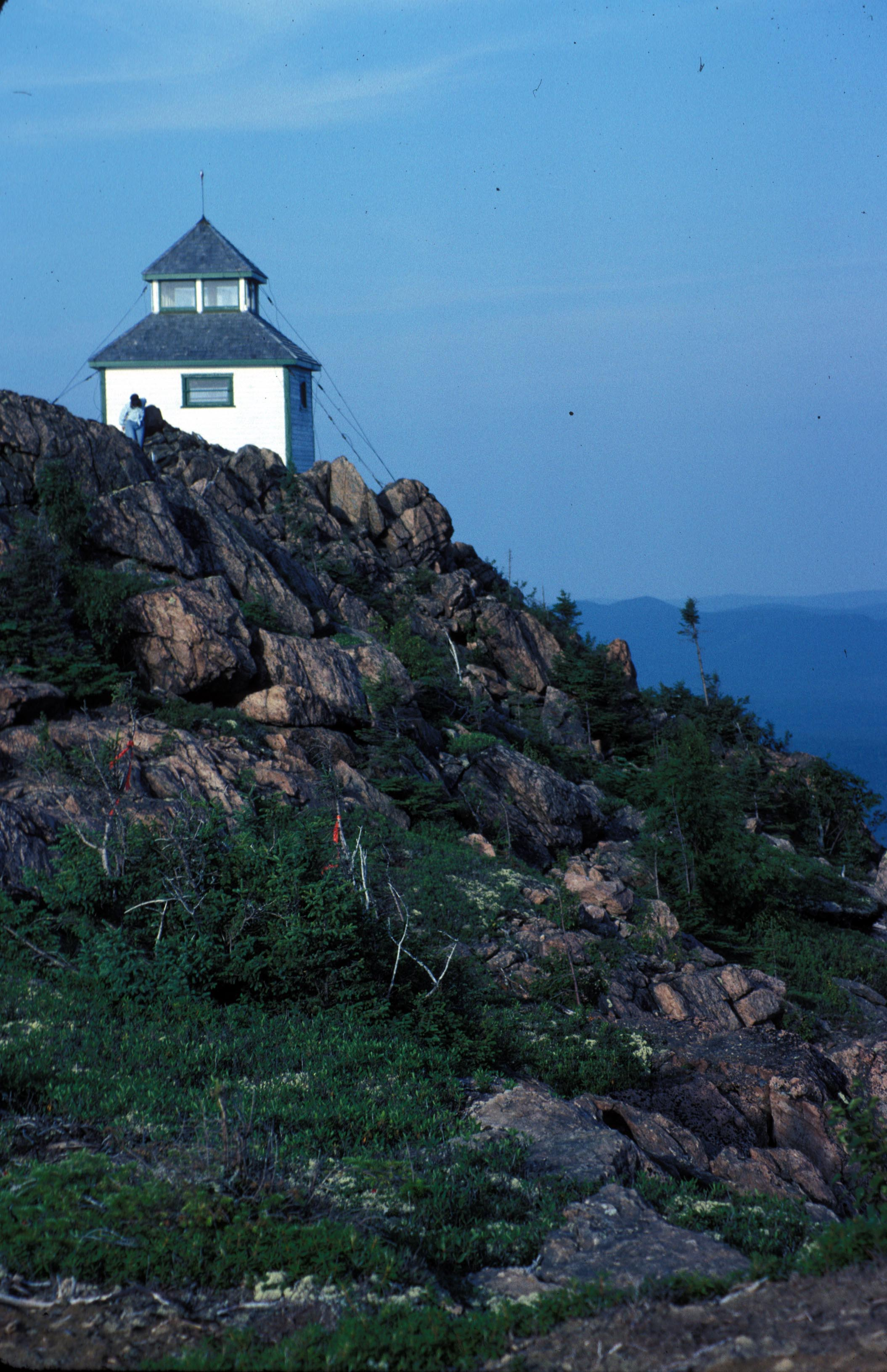
Fire-spotting hut on Mount Carleton

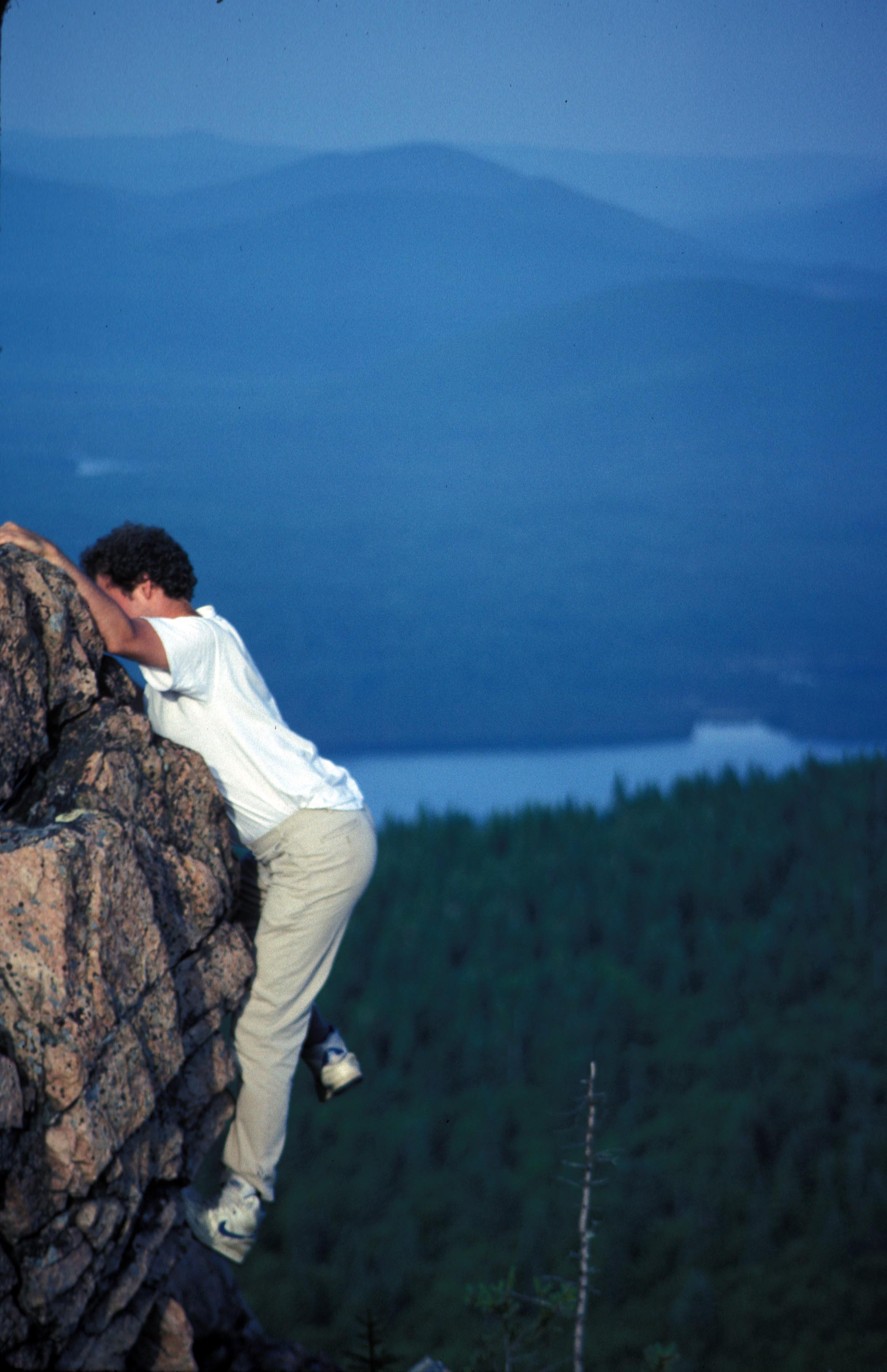
Climbing near peak of Mount Carleton (IR Walker 1993)

Mount Carleton (French: Mont Carleton), at 820 metres (2,690 ft), is the highest peak in the Canadian province of New Brunswick, and the Maritime Provinces. Located in Mount Carleton Provincial Park, it is one of the highlights of the Canadian portion of the International Appalachian Trail. Mount Carleton is also part of the eighth and final section of the Nepisiguit Mi'gmaq Trail. The mountain was named after Thomas Carleton, New Brunswick's first lieutenant governor, and forms part of the Notre Dame Mountains chain, which is visible on Map 24 of the NB Atlas.

Before aerial surveillance was extensively used, a hut was maintained on the summit for fire-spotting in the remote north-central part of the province. A very similar hut was maintained on Big Bald Mountain. Triangulation among these huts and other fire towers allowed the locations of wildfires to be determined quickly and easily.

Mount Carleton is a monadnock, an erosional remnant of resistant igneous rocks that remained after an ancient Mesozoic peneplain surface was uplifted in the Cenozoic to form a plateau, and subsequently dissected via millions of years of erosion by wind, water and glacial ice. It consists of 400 million-year-old rhyolitic and basaltic volcanics.

== See also ==
- List of highest points of Canadian provinces and territories
- Mountain peaks of Canada
- Mountain peaks of North America
- List of mountains of New Brunswick
