= Caribou zinc mine =

Mine in New Brunswick, Canada

- Location in New Brunswick
- Location: Restigouche County, New Brunswick, Canada; 47°33′54″N 66°17′35″W
- Products: Lead, Zinc, Copper
- Discovered: 1955
- Opened: 1970
- Company: Trevali Mining
- Acquired: 2009

The Caribou Mine is a copper-lead-zinc mine in the Bathurst Mining Camp of northern New Brunswick, Canada. It was discovered in 1955 and has seen several stages of development and production. The mine has changed ownership four times in the past 20 years.

== Geology ==
The Caribou deposit is a volcanogenic massive sulphide (VMS) deposit rich in lead, zinc, copper, silver and gold.

== History ==
=== Changing Ownership ===
Breakwater Resources owned the Caribou mine from 1995 until 2006, when the operation was taken over by Blue Note Metals Inc.

Blue Note Caribou Mines Inc. filed for bankruptcy in the summer of 2009. An Ontario-based company purchased the mine in September 2009 with the intent to reopen it.

Caribou mine is currently owned by Trevali Mining Corporation and is on care and maintenance. Receiver appointed January 2023 under terms of the CCAA.
