= Brunswick 12 mine =

Mine in New Brunswick, Canada

Brunswick #12
- Location in New Brunswick
- Location: Gloucester County, New Brunswick, Canada; 47°28′48″N 65°52′30″W
- Products: Lead, Zinc, Copper
- Discovered: 1953
- Opened: 1964
- Closed: 2013
- Company: Xstrata
- Acquired: 2005

The Brunswick #12 mine is an underground lead-zinc-copper mine in the Bathurst Mining Camp of northern New Brunswick, Canada. It was discovered in January, 1953 and entered production in April, 1964. The Brunswick #12 orebody is the largest deposit in the Bathurst area and was one of the largest underground zinc mines in the world well into the late 1990s. The mine was officially closed at the end of April, 2013.

== Geology ==
The supergiant Brunswick #12 deposit is a volcanogenic massive sulfide (VMS) deposit rich in lead, zinc, and copper. Currently the copper-rich portion of the deposit has not been mined.
