= Heath Steele Mines =

Mine in New Brunswick, Canada

Heath Steele Mine
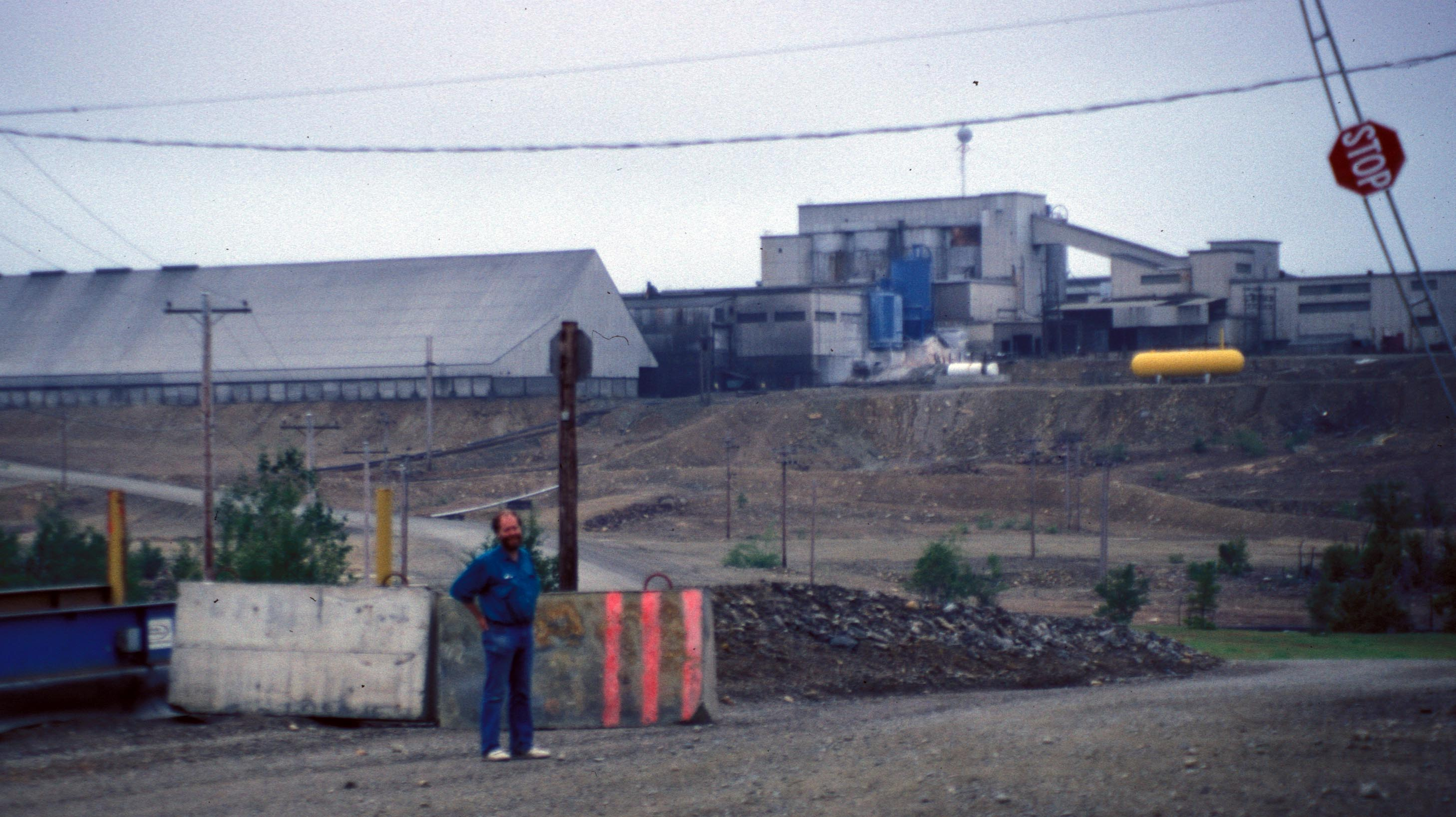
- Ore processing facility at Heath Steele Mines (BR Walker 1993)

- Location in New Brunswick
- Location: Northumberland County, New Brunswick, Canada; 47°17′00″N 66°04′00″W
- Products: Copper, Lead, Zinc
- Discovered: 1953
- Opened: 1957
- Closed: 1999
- Company: Noranda
- Acquired: 1979

Heath Steele Mines, situated 60 km (37 mi) northwest of Newcastle, New Brunswick, Canada, at the headwaters of the Tomogonops and Little Rivers, was a large and productive copper, lead, and zinc mine which operated from 1956 to 1999. The mine was an economic cornerstone of Miramichi communities throughout this period.

The mine was initially developed as a collaboration between the American Metal Company (later Amax) and the International Nickel Company (INCO) and consequently was also known as the Little River Joint Venture.

The mine was named after Mr. Heath Steele, the Vice-President of Exploration of the American Metal Company. It seems that Mr. Steele had little directly to do with the mine, but the parent company probably bestowed the name as an honour on his retirement from the company.

No smelter was included in the facility. The ore concentrates were instead hauled by rail to various smelter operations (for example at Belledune) for further processing, or to the ports at Newcastle and Dalhousie, New Brunswick where the concentrates could be shipped to customers overseas (e.g., Spain, Finland).

== History ==
The first orebody at the Heath Steele site, Heath Steele A Zone, was discovered in 1953 by prospectors working for Matthew James Boylen. Mr. Boylen brought more mines into production than anyone else in Canadian history and was inducted into the Canadian Mining Hall of Fame. This was the first discovery in Canada of an ore body by means of an airborne electromagnetic survey (AEM).

American Metals had financed Mr. Boylen's exploration, and as a result of a 1953 agreement with Inco, acquired a 75% ownership of the new mine. Initial exploratory drilling estimated the reserves as including 4,200,000 tonnes (4,100,000 long tons; 4,600,000 short tons) (2.9% Lead, 7.1% Zinc, 1.1% Copper, 3.20 ounces/ton Silver, and 0.02 ounces/ton Gold) and 300,000 tonnes (300,000 long tons; 330,000 short tons) (1.2% Lead, 3.5% Zinc, 1.3% Copper, 1.90 ounces/ton Silver, and 0.02 ounces/ton Gold).

By 1957, a mine and milling operation was established to extract copper, lead, and zinc from the ore; it was served by a 30 km (19 mi) railway line from the CN Rail main line at Bartibog Station. Due to low metal prices and metallurgical issues, the mining operation was suspended in April 1958. Mining resumed in June 1962. In 1969 the mine started an ambitious expansion, and by 1979 was producing over 185,000 tonnes (182,000 long tons; 204,000 short tons) of mineral concentrates per year.

As the ore body was gradually depleted operations were increasingly dependent on strong metal prices. In 1979, Noranda purchased American Metals 75% share in the operation. Metal prices declined, forcing the mine to suspend operations in April 1983. In 1986, Noranda purchased all of the remaining interest in the mine. The mine reopened in 1989, closed in 1991, and re-opened in 1992. Mining was again suspended in July 1993, resuming in November 1994. As of 1994, reserves stood at 360,000 tonnes (350,000 long tons; 400,000 short tons) (7.1% zinc, 2.0% lead, 0.9% copper, and 73 g/t silver). The underground mine was finally closed and allowed to flood in 1999.

Over the years, concerns were often vented concerning the potential environmental impact of this mining operation, and more specifically heavy metal pollution and acid mine drainage, on the Tomogonops and Miramichi River systems. Fish kills in these rivers were occasionally (e.g., 1960 and 1991) attributed to the company.

== Geology ==
The Heath Steele deposits are volcanogenic massive sulfide ore deposits rich in copper, lead, and zinc.
