= Nepisiguit River =

River in northern New Brunswick, Canada

Coordinates: 47°33′21.3″N 65°39′54.8″W

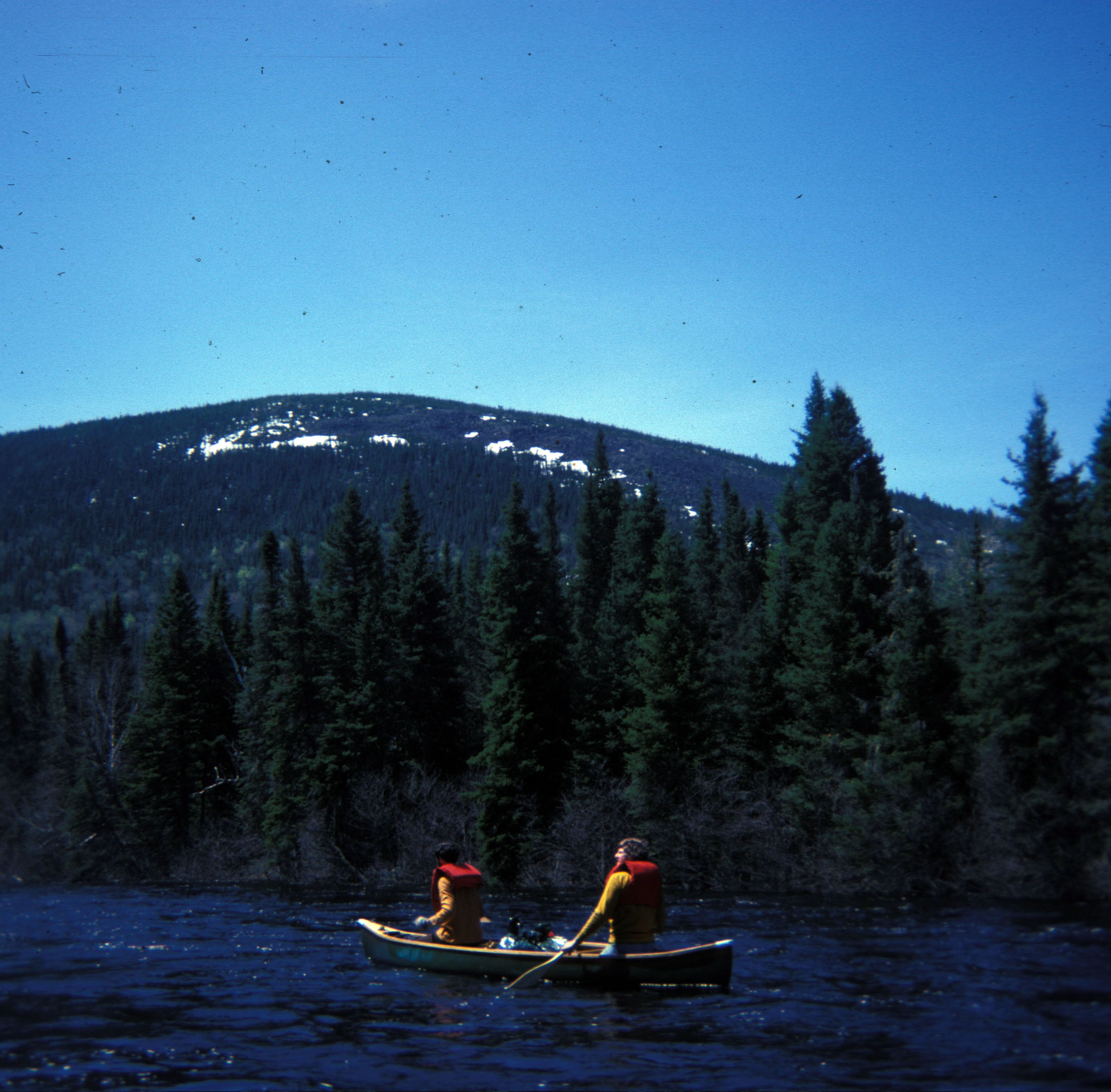
Canoeing the Nepisiguit River east of Popple Depot (1977)

The Nepisiguit River (Mi'kmaq: Nepisigwitg) is a major river in northern New Brunswick, Canada, which enters the sea at the city of Bathurst, into the Nepisiguit Bay, part of the Bay of Chaleur.

Appears in Jesuit Relations (1643) as Nepegiguit, a corruption through the French of the Micmac Win-peg-ij-oo-ik, "the river that dashes roughly along", a reference to the torrential character of the river.

== Description ==
The source of the river lies north of the Christmas Mountains, in the rugged terrain between Mount Carleton, and Big Bald Mountain. Several falls are present along the river's course, including Indian Falls (near Popple Depot), Nepisiguit Falls and Pabineau Falls. Along this river lies a vast forest, where many individuals from New Brunswick set up camps. Lodges are set up along the river including Governors Lodge, Rogers Lake Lodge and many others. These lodges play host to the many individuals taking part in several different outdoor activities including hunting, fishing and snowmobiling along the river.

The Nepisiguit River is known for its fishing. Fishing along the Nepisiguit consists of Atlantic Salmon fishing as well as other fishing types including trout. Hunting is also another activity that takes part along the Nepisiguit because the significant animal population and various species within this region afford it. Some of the animals hunted along the Nepisiguit River include moose, deer, ruffed grouse and spruce grouse

The Nepisiguit River and surrounding area also have some of the best snowmobiling trails. During the winter months, individuals from around New Brunswick as well as other parts of Canada come to the Nepisiguit region to take part and join in the snowmobiling community.

The river is followed for much of its length by the Nepisiguit Mi'gmaq Trail, a hiking and backpacking trail that opened in 2018, retracing an ancient trail and portage route along the river.

== History ==
William Francis Ganong remarked that, in his day, the Nepisiguit was the most remarkable river for fishing and hunting.

Nepisiguit Falls was developed for hydroelectric power generation as early as 1920.

Bob Baker remembers that there was a five-year period between 1969 and 1974 where there were almost no fish in the river, primarily due to acid rain and toxic run-off from Brunswick Mines. The Nepisiguit Salmon Association (NSA) was created to lobby government in 1976. In 1981, the NSA partnered with Fisheries and Oceans Canada in a yearly summer programme to restock the salmon population. By 1988, five thousand salmon populated the river, in contrast to hundreds before the programme was started. From 1981 to 1993, over $1.5 million in funding was secured. By the 2000s, volunteers with the programme were awarded significant prizes.

In the years prior to 2017, volunteers placed a hundred thousand salmon fry per annum in the river as part of the restocking programme. Each September, volunteers begin selecting the largest as broodstock destined for the Charlo hatchery where eggs are collected and fertilized. The tiny alevins are placed, once hatched, in protective incubation boxes above and below Nepisiguit Falls. They are released into the river once they have reached the fry stage in their life cycle.

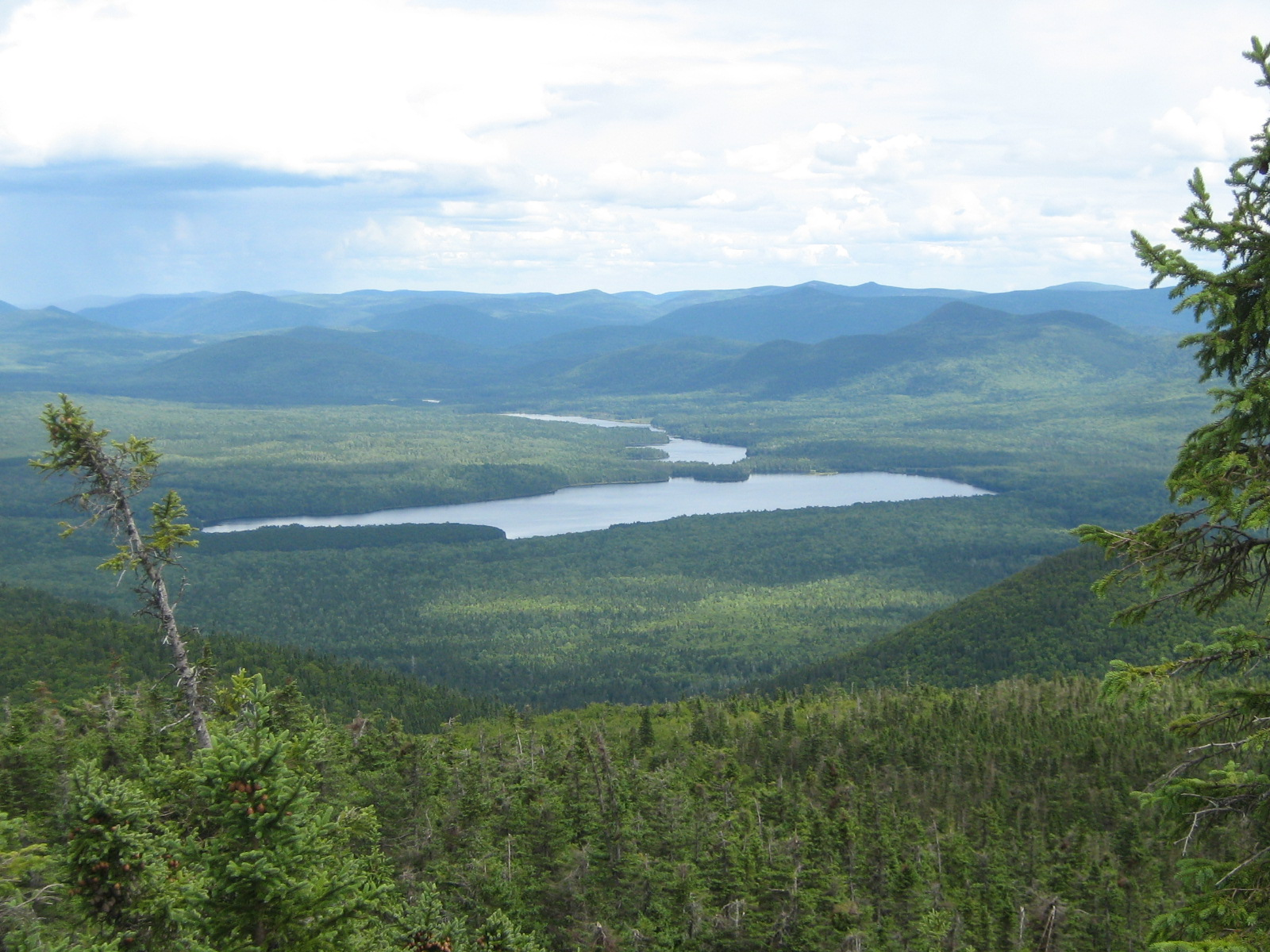
Headwaters of the Nepisiguit River: Nepisiguit Lakes in Mount Carleton Provincial Park

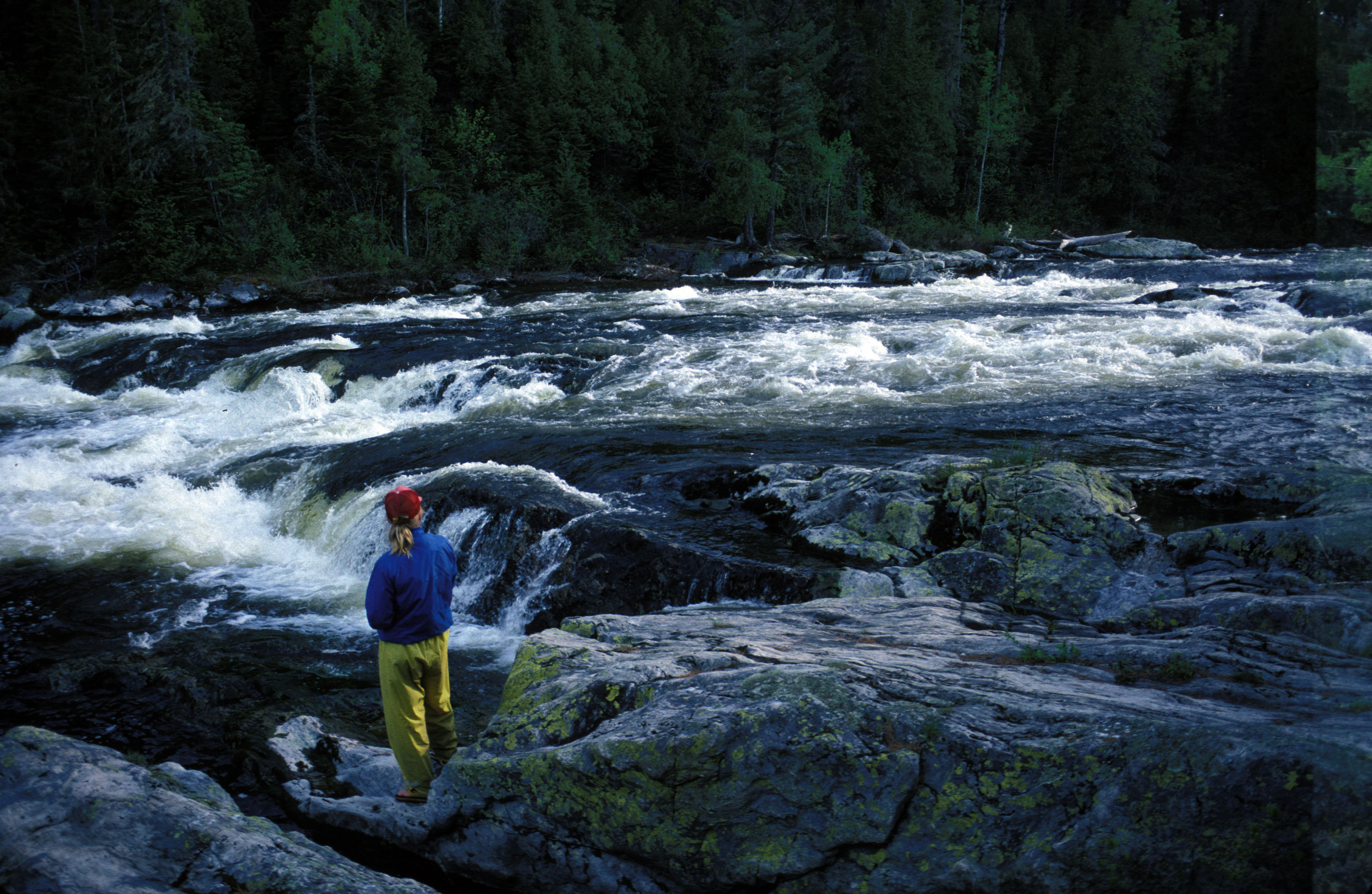
Indian Falls on the Nepisiguit River, east of Popple Depot

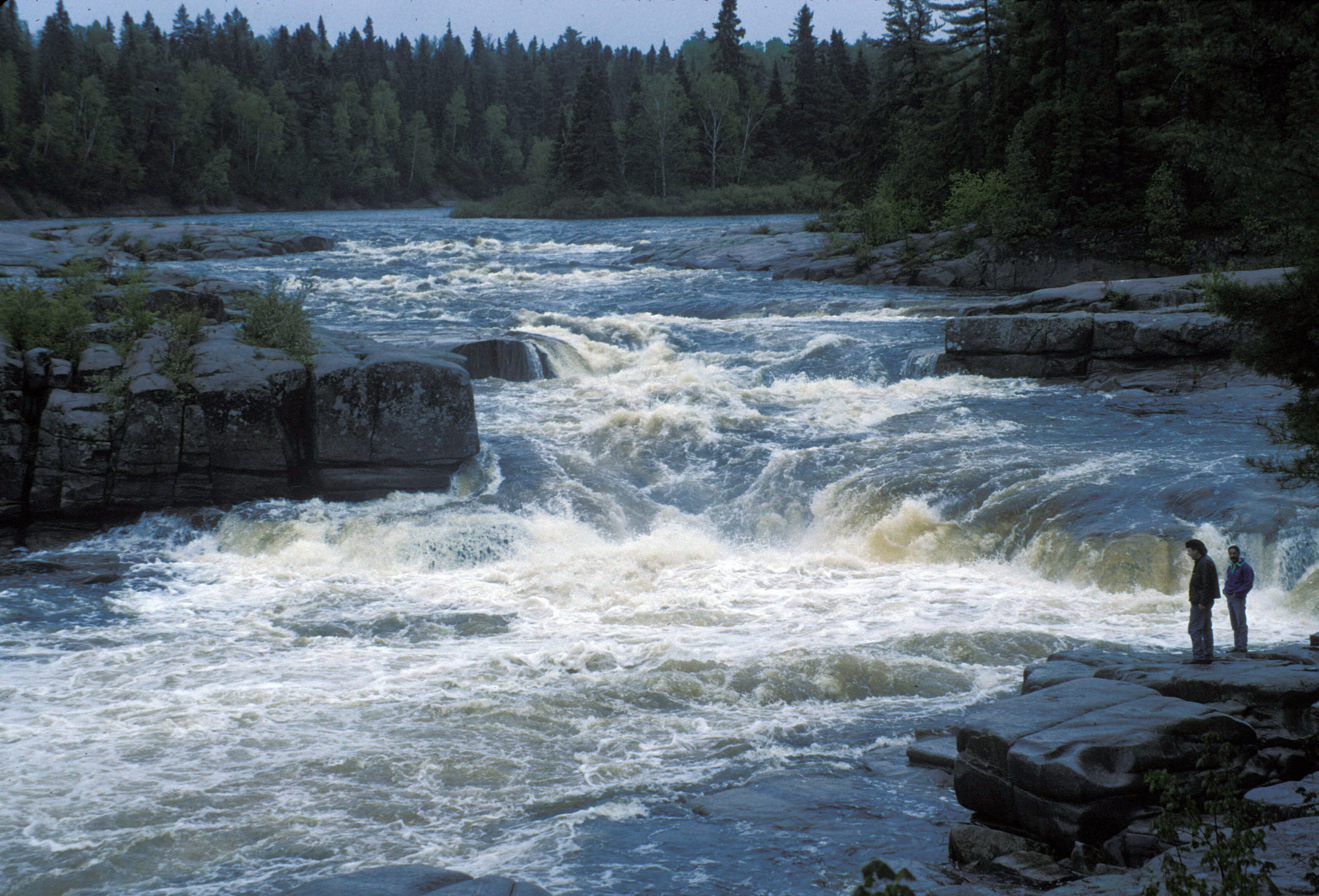
Pabineau Falls on the Nepisiguit River near Bathurst

== See also ==
- List of rivers of New Brunswick
- Nepisiguit Mi'gmaq Trail
