= Volcanogenic massive sulfide ore deposit =

Metal sulfide ore deposit

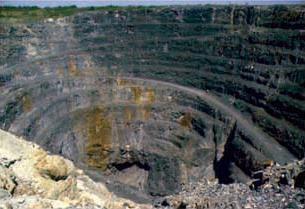
Volcanogenic massive sulfide ore deposit at Kidd Mine, Timmins, Ontario, Canada, formed 2.7 billion years ago on an ancient seafloor

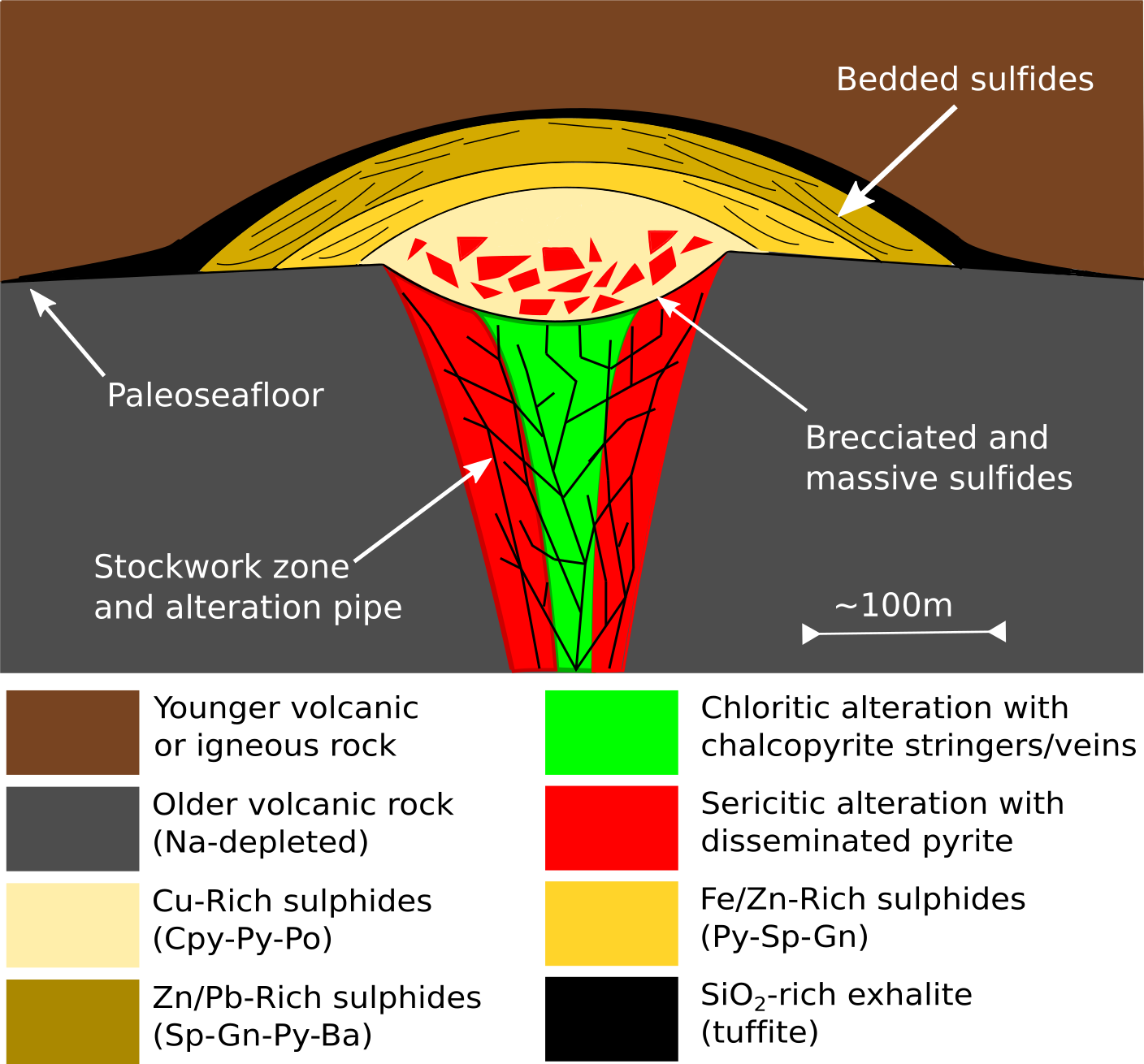
A cross-section of a typical volcanogenic massive sulfide (VMS) ore deposit as seen in the sedimentary record

Volcanogenic massive sulfide ore deposits, also known as VMS ore deposits, are a type of metal sulfide ore deposit, mainly copper-zinc which are associated with and produced by volcanic-associated hydrothermal vents in submarine environments.

These deposits are also sometimes called volcanic-hosted massive sulfide (VHMS) deposits. The density generally is 4500 kg/m^{3}. They are predominantly stratiform accumulations of sulfide minerals that precipitate from hydrothermal fluids on or below the seafloor in a wide range of ancient and modern geological settings. In modern oceans they are synonymous with sulfurous plumes called black smokers.

They occur within environments dominated by volcanic or volcanic derived (e.g., volcano-sedimentary) rocks, and the deposits are coeval and coincident with the formation of said volcanic rocks. As a class, they represent a significant source of the world's copper, zinc, lead, gold and silver ores, with cobalt, tin, barium, sulfur, selenium, manganese, cadmium, indium, bismuth, tellurium, gallium and germanium as co- or by-products.

Volcanogenic massive sulfide deposits are forming today on the seafloor around undersea volcanoes along many mid ocean ridges, and within back-arc basins and forearc rifts. Mineral exploration companies are exploring for seafloor massive sulfide deposits; however, most exploration is concentrated in the search for land-based equivalents of these deposits.

The close association with volcanic rocks and eruptive centers sets VMS deposits apart from similar ore deposit types which share similar source, transport and trap processes. Volcanogenic massive sulfide deposits are distinctive in that ore deposits are formed in close temporal association with submarine volcanism and are formed by hydrothermal circulation and exhalation of sulfides which are independent of sedimentary processes, which sets VMS deposits apart from sedimentary exhalative (SEDEX) deposits.

There is a subclass of VMS deposits, the volcanic- and sediment-hosted massive sulfide (VSHMS) deposits, that do share characteristics that are hybrid between the VMS and SEDEX deposits. Notable examples of this class include the deposits of the Bathurst Mining Camp, New Brunswick, Canada (e.g., Brunswick #12); the deposits of the Iberian Pyrite Belt, Portugal and Spain, and the Wolverine deposit, Yukon, Canada.

== Genetic model ==
- The source of metal and sulfur in VMS deposits is a combination of incompatible elements which are leached from the volcanic pile in the sub-seafloor hydrothermal alteration zone by hydrothermal circulation. Hydrothermal circulation is generally considered to be driven via heat in the crust often related to deep-seated gabbro intrusions.
- Transport of metals occurs via convection of hydrothermal fluids, the heat for this supplied by the magma chamber which sits below the volcanic edifice. Cool ocean water is drawn into the hydrothermal zone and is heated by the volcanic rock and is then expelled into the ocean, the process enriching the hydrothermal fluid in sulfur and metal ions.
- The ore materials are trapped within a fumarole field or a black smoker field when they are expelled into the ocean, cool, and precipitate sulfide minerals as stratiform sulfide ore. Some deposits show evidence of formation via deposition of sulfide via replacement of altered volcanosedimentary rocks and may also form by invasion of sulfur-rich brines into unconsolidated sediments.

== Geology ==
The typical location for VMS deposits is at the top of the felsic volcanic sequence, within a sequence of volcaniclastic tuffaceous epiclastics, cherts, sediments or perhaps fine tuffs which are usually related to the underlying volcanics. The hangingwall to the deposit is broadly related to a more mafic sequence of volcanic rocks, either andesite (examples being Whim Creek & Mons Cupri, Western Australia or Millenbach, Canada), or basalt (Hellyer, Tasmania) or absent or sediments only (Kangaroo Caves, Western Australia).

VMS deposits are associated spatially and temporally with felsic volcanic rocks, usually present in the stratigraphy below the deposit and often as the direct footwall to the deposit. Sediments are usually contiguous with VMS deposits in some form or another and typically are present as (manganiferous) cherts and chemical sediments deposited within a submarine environment.

The hanging wall to the deposit can be volcanic units essentially contiguous and coeval with the footwall rocks, indicating mineralisation was developed during an inter-eruptive pause. In bimodal volcanic subtypes, it may be volcanic rock dissimilar to the footwall volcanics or sedimentary strata if mineralisation occurred toward the end of an eruptive cycle.

Hybrid VMS-SEDEX deposits of the siliciclastic associations (see below) may be developed within interflow sediments or within units of sedimentary rocks which are present discontinuously throughout a larger and essentially contiguous volcanic package.

Altogether, these geological features have been interpreted to show an association of VMS deposits with hydrothermal systems developed above or around submarine volcanic centres.

=== Morphology ===
VMS deposits have a wide variety of morphologies, with mound shaped and bowl shaped deposits most typical. The bowl-shaped formations formed due to venting of hydrothermal solutions into submarine depressions – in many cases, this type of deposit can be confused with sedimentary exhalative deposits. The mound-shaped deposits formed in a way similar to that of modern massive sulfide deposits – via production of a hydrothermal mound formed by successive black smoker chimneys. Deposits that have formed in environments dominated by sedimentary rocks or highly permeable volcanic rocks can show a tabular morphology that mimics the geometry of the surrounding rocks.

VMS deposits have an ideal form of a conical area of highly altered volcanic or volcanogenic sedimentary rock within the feeder zone, which is called the stringer sulfide or stockwork zone, overlain by a mound of massive exhalites, and flanked by stratiform exhalative sulfides known as the apron.

The stockwork zone typically consists of vein-hosted sulfides (mostly chalcopyrite, pyrite, and pyrrhotite) with quartz, chlorite and lesser carbonates and barite.

The mound zone consists of laminated massive to brecciated pyrite, sphalerite (± galena), hematite, and barite. The mound can be up to several tens of metres thick and several hundred metres in diameter.

The apron zone is generally more oxidised, with stratiform, laminated sulfidic sediments, similar to SEDEX ores, and is generally manganese, barium and hematite enriched, with cherts, jaspers and chemical sediments common.

=== Metal zonation ===
Most VMS deposits show metal zonation, caused by the changing physical and chemical environments of the circulating hydrothermal fluid. Ideally, this forms a core of massive pyrite and chalcopyrite around the throat of the vent system, with a halo of chalcopyrite-sphalerite-pyrite grading into a distal sphalerite-galena and galena-manganese and finally a chert-manganese-hematite facies. Most VMS deposits show a vertical zonation of gold, with the cooler upper portions generally more enriched in gold and silver.

The mineralogy of VMS consists of over 90% iron sulfide, mainly in the form of pyrite, with chalcopyrite, sphalerite and galena also being major constituents. Magnetite is present in minor amounts; as magnetite content increases, the ores grade into massive oxide deposits. The gangue (the uneconomic waste material) is mainly quartz and pyrite or pyrrhotite. Due to the high density of the deposits some have marked gravity anomalies (Neves-Corvo, Portugal) which is of use in exploration.

=== Alteration morphology ===
Alteration haloes developed by VMS deposits are typically conical in shape, occur mostly stratigraphically below the original fluid flow location (not necessarily the ore itself), and are typically zoned.

The most intense alteration (containing the stringer sulfide zone) is generally located directly underneath the greatest concentration of massive sulfides, within the footwall volcanic sequence. If the stringer zone is displaced from the sulfides, it is often the product of tectonic deformation, or the formation of a hybrid SEDEX-like distal pool of sulfides.

The alteration assemblages of the footwall alteration zone is, from core outwards;

- Silica alteration zone, found in the most intensely altered examples, resulting in complete silica replacement of the host rocks, and associated with chalcopyrite-pyrite stringer zones.
- Chlorite zone, found in nearly all examples, consisting of chlorite ± sericite ± silica. Often the host rock is entirely replaced by chlorite, which may appear as a chlorite schist in deformed examples.
- Sericite zone, found in nearly all examples, consisting of sericite ± chlorite ± silica,
- Silicification zone, often gradational with background silica-albite metasomatism.

In all cases, these alteration zones are metasomatism effects in the strictest sense, resulting in the addition of potassium, silica, magnesium, and depletion of sodium. Chlorite minerals are usually more magnesian in composition within the footwall alteration zone of a VMS deposit than equivalent rocks within the same formation distally. The hangingwall to a VMS deposit is often weakly sodium-depleted.

Alteration not associated with the ore-forming process may also be omnipresent both above and below the massive sulfide deposit. Typical alteration textures associated with devitrification of submarine volcanic rocks such as rhyolitic glasses, notably formation of spherulites, of perlite, lithophysae, and low-temperature prehnite-pumpellyite facies sub-seafloor alteration is ubiquitous though often overprinted by later metamorphic events.

Metamorphic mineralogical, textural and structural changes within the host volcanic sequence may also further serve to disguise original metasomatic mineral assemblages.

== Classification ==
Deposits of this class have been classified by numerous workers in different ways (e.g., metal sources, type examples, geodynamic setting – see Franklin et al. (1981) and Lydon (1984)). The magmatic assemblages of VMS deposits are associated with varying tectonic settings and geological environments during the formation of the VMS. The following five subclasses have specific petrochemical assemblages that resemble a specific geodynamic environment, during the event of formation:

=== Mafic associated ===
VMS deposits are associated with geological environments dominated by mafic rocks, commonly ophiolite sequences. The Cyprus and Oman ophiolites host examples, and ophiolite-hosted deposits are found in the Newfoundland Appalachians, which represent classic districts of this subclass.

=== Bimodal-mafic ===
VMS deposits are associated with environments dominated by mafic volcanic rocks but with up to 25% felsic volcanic rocks, the latter often hosting the deposits. The Noranda, Flin Flon-Snow Lake and Kidd Creek camps would be classic districts of this group.

=== Mafic-siliciclastic ===
VMS deposits are associated with sub-equal proportions of mafic volcanic and siliciclastic rocks; felsic rocks can be a minor component; and mafic (and ultramafic) intrusive rocks are common. In metamorphic terranes may be known as or pelitic-mafic associated VMS deposits. The Besshi deposits in Japan and Windy Craggy, BC, represent classic districts of this group.

=== Felsic-siliciclastic ===
VMS deposits are associated with siliciclastic sedimentary rock-dominated settings with abundant felsic rocks and less than 10% mafic material. These settings are often shale-rich siliciclastic-felsic or bimodal siliciclastic. The Bathurst Mining Camp in New Brunswick, Canada; Iberian Pyrite Belt, Spain and Portugal; and Finlayson Lake areas, Yukon, Canada are classic districts of this group.

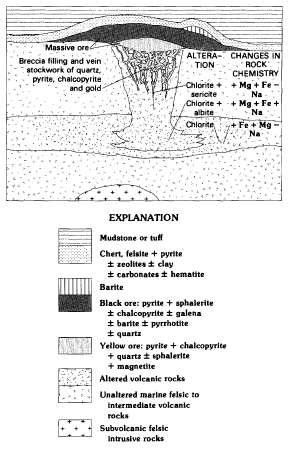
Kuroko Massive Sulfide Cross section

=== Bimodal-felsic ===
VMS deposits are associated with bimodal sequences where felsic rocks are in greater abundance than mafic rocks with only minor sedimentary rocks. The Kuroko deposits, Japan; Buchans deposits, Canada; and Skellefte deposits, Sweden are classic districts of this group.

== Distribution ==
In the geological past, the majority of VMS deposits were formed in rift environments associated with volcanic rocks. In particular, they formed throughout geological time associated with mid-ocean ridge spreading centres, back-arc spreading centres, and forearc spreading centres. A common theme to all environments of VMS deposits through time is the association with spreading (i.e., an extensional geodynamic regime). The deposits are typically associated with bimodal sequences (sequences with subequal percentages of mafic and felsic rocks – e.g., Noranda or Kuroko), felsic and sediment-rich environments (e.g., Bathurst), mafic and sediment-rich environments (e.g., Besshi or Windy Craggy), or mafic-dominated settings (e.g., Cyprus and other ophiolite hosted deposits).

The majority of world deposits are small, with about 80% of known deposits in the range 0.1-10 Mt. Examples of VMS deposits are Kidd Creek, Ontario, Canada; Flin Flon in the Flin Flon greenstone belt, Manitoba, Canada (777 and Trout Lake Mine); Brunswick #12, New Brunswick, Canada; Rio Tinto, Spain; Greens Creek mine, Alaska, U.S..

== See also ==
- Ore genesis
- Ore definition
- Volcanology
- Hydrothermal vent
