= Wyers Brook, New Brunswick =

Wyers Brook
- Unincorporated community
- Location of Wyers Brook, New Brunswick
- Coordinates: 47.9°N 67.0°W
- Country: Canada
- Province: New Brunswick
- County: Restigouche
- Parish: Eldon
- Electoral Districts Federal: Madawaska—Restigouche
- Provincial: Campbellton-Restigouche Centre

Government
  - Type: Local service district
- Time zone: UTC-4 (AST)
  - Summer (DST): UTC-3 (ADT)
- Postal code(s): E3N: 6K4, 6K6-6K8
- Area code: 506
- Access Routes: Wyers Road via Route 17

Wyers Brook is an unincorporated community in Restigouche County, New Brunswick, Canada.

== See also ==
- History of New Brunswick
- List of communities in New Brunswick
- List of historic places in Restigouche County, New Brunswick
- List of people from Restigouche County, New Brunswick
