= Eldon Parish, New Brunswick =

Eldon
- Parish
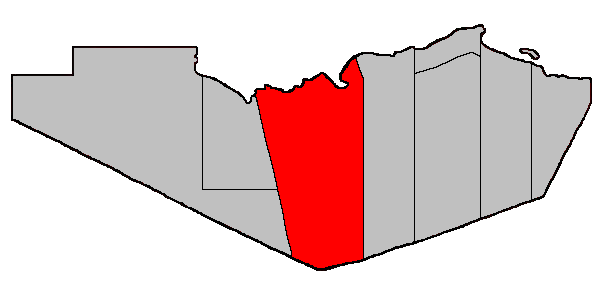
- Location within Restigouche County.
- Coordinates: 47.75°N 67.075°W
- Country: Canada
- Province: New Brunswick
- County: Restigouche
- Erected: 1827
- Dissolved: 1879
- Reërected: 1896

Area
  - Land: 1,688.58 km^{2} (651.96 sq mi)

Population (2021)
  - Total: 674
  - Density: 0.4/km^{2} (1.0/sq mi)
  - Change 2016-2021: ▲0.3%
  - Dwellings: 369
- Time zone: UTC-4 (AST)
  - Summer (DST): UTC-3 (ADT)
- Population change reflects revised total for 2016.

Eldon is a geographic parish in Restigouche County, New Brunswick, Canada. (Note: The Territorial Division Act divides the province into 152 parishes, the cities of Saint John and Fredericton, and one town of Grand Falls. The Interpretation Act clarifies that parishes include any local government within their borders.)

For governance purposes it is divided between the incorporated rural community of Kedgwick and the Restigouche rural district, both of which are members of the Restigouche Regional Service Commission.

Before the 2023 governance reform, the parish was divided into four local service districts and part of another. Mann Mountain was opposite the mouth of the Matapedia River, with Flatlands straddling the eastern border; St. Jean Baptiste – Menneval, White's Brook were both along Route 17, nearer Kedgwick than Campbellton; the LSD of the parish of Eldon comprised the remainder of the parish. In the reform, Kedgwick annexed the community of Wyers Brook, properties on either side of Route 17 south from Glenwood, and all of the parish to the west; the remainder became part of the rural district.

== Origin of name ==
The parish was named in honour of the Earl of Eldon, Lord High Chancellor of Great Britain at the time of its erection.

== History ==
Eldon was erected in 1827 from Beresford Parish. Eldon comprised Restigouche County west of the Upsalquitch River, with the county line being a prolongation of the western boundary of Northumberland County.

In 1840 the eastern boundary was altered to run due south from the mouth of the Upsalquitch.

In 1852 the western county line was changed to its current location; Eldon's western line moved with it.

In 1879 Eldon was dissolved and its territory added to Addington Parish.

In 1896 Eldon was re-erected from Addington, with the eastern line now further east in its modern configuration.

In 1916 the western part of Eldon was erected as Grimmer Parish. Grimmer included what is now Saint-Quentin Parish.

== Boundaries ==
Eldon Parish is bounded:

- on the north by the Quebec boundary, running through the Restigouche River;
- on the east by a line beginning near the lower end of Bell Island, on the eastern line of a grant to John Johnson, then running southeasterly along the Johnston grant and its prolongation, with a slight bend, to the northeastern corner of a grant to James Dunn on the northern side of Evergreen Road, then along the Dunn grant and its prolongation to a point about 1 kilometre west of Route 17 and 2 kilometres south of Evergreen Road, then running true south to the county line;
- on the south by the Northumberland and Victoria County lines;
- on the west by a line beginning on the county line about 525 metres south of O'Dare Brook and about 3 kilometres west of the Tobique River, then running north-northwesterly in a straight line to the mouth of Upper Thorn Point Brook on the Restigouche;
- including the river islands in front of the parish.

== Communities ==
Communities at least partly within the parish.

- Adams Gulch
- Dawsonville
- Evergreen
- Glenwood
- Mann Mountain Settlement
- Mann Siding
- Menneval
- Millerville
- Robinsonville
- Saint-Jean-Baptiste-de-Restigouche
- Upsalquitch
- Whites Brook
- Wyers Brook

== Bodies of water ==
Bodies of water (Note: Not including brooks, ponds or coves.) at least partly within the parish.

- Left Hand Branch Mamozekel River
- Northwest Upsalquitch River
- Restigouche River
- Tobique River
- Upsalquitch River
- Burntland Lake
- Lac du Petit-Vingt-Deux
- Eighteen Mile Lake
- McKenzie Lake
- Nictau Lake
- Poison Lake

== Islands ==
Islands at least partly within the parish.

- Adams Island
- Almons Island
- Bell Island
- Cross Point Island
- Croswell Island
- England Island
- Gilmores Island
- Mann Island
- Marshall Island
- Marshalls Island
- McAndrews Island
- McDougalls Island
- Mink Island
- Mocklers Island
- Pine Island
- Poker Island
- Taylor Island
- Walker Island

== Other notable places ==
Parks, historic sites, and other noteworthy places at least partly within the parish.

- Mount Carleton Provincial Park

== Demographics ==
=== Population ===
Canada census – Eldon community profile

| | 2021 | 2016 | 2011 |
| Population | 674 (+0.3% from 2016) | 657 (-5.9%% from 2011) | 698 (-10.4% from 2006) |
| Land area | 1,688.58 km^{2} (651.96 sq mi) | 1,681.46 km^{2} (649.22 sq mi) | 1,681.54 km^{2} (649.25 sq mi) |
| Population density | 0.4/km^{2} (1.0/sq mi) | 0.4/km^{2} (1.0/sq mi) | 0.4/km^{2} (1.0/sq mi) |
| Median age | 55.6 (M: 55.6, F: 55.6) | 54.2 (M: 54.7, F: 53.6) | 52.0 (M: 51.8, F: 52.1) |
| Private dwellings | 369 (total) 335 (occupied) | 360 (total) | 375 (total) |
| Median household income | $50,000 | $42,112 | $.N/A |

Notes: 2011 income data for this area has been suppressed for data quality or confidentiality reasons.
References: 2021 2016 2011

Historical Census Data - Eldon Parish, New Brunswick

| Year | Pop. | ±% |
|---|---|---|
| 1991 | 1,136 | — |
| 1996 | 1,005 | −11.5% |

| Year | Pop. | ±% |
|---|---|---|
| 2001 | 902 | −10.2% |
| 2006 | 779 | −13.6% |

| Year | Pop. | ±% |
|---|---|---|
| 2011 | 698 | −10.4% |
| 2016 | 657 | −5.9% |

=== Language ===
Canada Census Mother Tongue - Eldon Parish, New Brunswick
| Census | Total | English | | | French | | | English & French | | | Other | | |
| Year | Responses | Count | Trend | Pop % | Count | Trend | Pop % | Count | Trend | Pop % | Count | Trend | Pop % |
| 2016 | 655 | 330 | ▼8.3% | 50.38% | 320 | ▼3.0% | 48.85% | 5 | 0.0% | 0.76% | 0 | 0.0% | 0.0% |
| 2011 | 695 | 360 | ▲1.4% | 51.80% | 330 | ▼19.5% | 47.48% | 5 | ▼66.7% | 0.72% | 0 | 0.0% | 0.00% |
| 2006 | 780 | 355 | ▼22.8% | 45.51% | 410 | ▼2.4% | 52.56% | 15 | ▼25.0% | 1.92% | 0 | 0.0% | 0.00% |
| 2001 | 900 | 460 | ▼19.3% | 51.11% | 420 | ▼11.6% | 46.67% | 20 | ▲ n/a% | 2.22% | 0 | 0.0% | 0.00% |
| 1996 | 1,045 | 570 | n/a | 54.55% | 475 | n/a | 45.45% | 0 | n/a | 0.00% | 0 | n/a | 0.00% |

== Access Routes ==
Highways and numbered routes that run through the parish, including external routes that start or finish at the parish limits:

- Highways
  - Route 11
  - Route 17
- Principal Routes
  - Route 180
- Secondary Routes:
  - Route 385
- External Routes:
  - R-132 (Quebec)

== See also ==
- List of parishes in New Brunswick
