= Upsalquitch =

Upsalquitch may refer to:

- Upsalquitch, New Brunswick, an unincorporated area
- Upsalquitch River, a tributary of the Restigouche River, flowing in Restigouche County, New Brunswick
- Southeast Upsalquitch River, a tributary of the Upsalquitch River flowing through Northumberland County and Restigouche County, New Brunswick
- Little Southeast Upsalquitch River, a tributary of the Upsalquitch Southeast River, flowing in the Balmoral Parish, New Brunswick
- Upsalquitch Northwest River, a tributary of the Upsalquitch River flowing through Restigouche County, New Brunswick
