= Glen Levit, New Brunswick =

Glen Levit
- Unincorporated community
- Location of Glen Levit, New Brunswick
- Coordinates: 47.966667°N 66.85°W
- Country: Canada
- Province: New Brunswick
- County: Restigouche
- Parish: Addington
- Electoral Districts Federal: Madawaska—Restigouche
- Provincial: Restigouche West

Government
  - Type: Local service district
- Time zone: UTC-4 (AST)
  - Summer (DST): UTC-3 (ADT)
- Postal code(s): E3N: 0A1; 4V6-4V9; 4W1-4W3, 4W8; 4X4; 4Y8-4Y9; 4Z1-4Z9; 5A1-5A3
- Area code: 506
- Access Routes: Route 17

Glen Levit is an unincorporated community in Restigouche County, New Brunswick, Canada.

== History ==
In 1866, only 18 families resided in the lumber and farming town. By 1898, two churches and a post office had been erected.

== See also ==
- History of New Brunswick
- List of communities in New Brunswick
- List of people from Restigouche County, New Brunswick
