= Addington Parish, New Brunswick =

Addington
- Parish
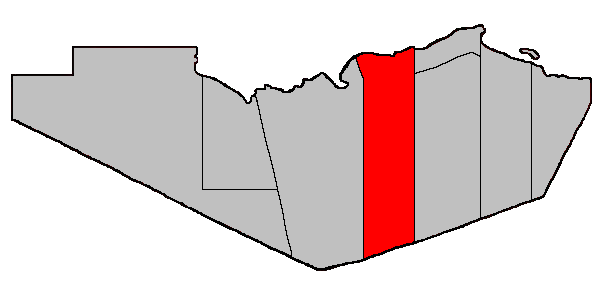
- Location within Restigouche County.
- Coordinates: 47.707777°N 66.76111°W
- Country: Canada
- Province: New Brunswick
- County: Restigouche
- Erected: 1827

Area
  - Land: 933.00 km^{2} (360.23 sq mi)

Population (2021)
  - Total: 698
  - Density: 0.7/km^{2} (1.8/sq mi)
  - Change 2016-2021: ▲6.4%
  - Dwellings: 354
- Time zone: UTC-4 (AST)
  - Summer (DST): UTC-3 (ADT)
- Figures do not include portions within the city of Campbellton and the villages of Atholville and Tide Head

Addington is a geographic parish in Restigouche County, New Brunswick, Canada. (Note: The Territorial Division Act divides the province into 152 parishes, the cities of Saint John and Fredericton, and one town of Grand Falls. The Interpretation Act clarifies that parishes include any local government within their borders.)

For governance purposes it is divided between the city of Campbellton and the Restigouche rural district, both of which are members of the Restigouche Regional Service Commission.

Before the 2023 governance reform, the northern part of the parish was heavily divided, with (moving upriver from the eastern parish line) the city of Campbellton, the village of Atholville, the village of Tide Head and the local service district of Flatlands, which straddled the western parish line; the (LSD) of Glencoe was inland of Tide Head and Flatlands, along Route 17 and Route 275, with Atholville extending inland around the loop of Route 275; the remainder of the parish's mainland formed the LSD of the parish of Addington. The islands in the Restigouche River were divided between Flatlands and Tide Head, though the boundary the village claimed differed from those recognised by the Regional Service Commission's map of Flatlands. The 2023 reform amalgamated Addington and Tide Head with Campbellton, annexing Glencoe with two parts of the LSD of the parish of Addington on either side of Walker Road, allowing a smoother boundary, while the boundary between the river islands was settled; Flatlands and the remainder of the parish LSD became part of the rural district.

== Origin of name ==
The parish was named in honour of Henry Unwin Addington, a diplomat who was appointed in 1826 as a plenipotentiary in the boundary negotiations with the United States. He was the nephew of Henry Addington, Prime Minister of the United Kingdom 1801–1804.

The other plenipotentiary in 1826 was William Huskisson, for whom Huskisson Parish in Kent County was named at the same time.

== History ==
Addington was erected in 1827 in Gloucester County from Beresford Parish. The parish comprised the area north of the prolongation of the southern line of modern Beresford and between the Benjamin and Upsalquitch Rivers.

In 1840 Restigouche County was reorganised following its erection. Addington was reduced to its modern eastern boundary while having its western boundary changed to a line due south from the mouth of the Upsalquitch River.

In 1879 Eldon Parish was dissolved and the area added to Addington.

In 1896 Eldon was reërected with altered boundaries, giving Addington its modern boundaries.

== Boundaries ==
Addington Parish is bounded:

- on the north by the Quebec provincial boundary, running through the Restigouche River;
- on the east by a line running true south from the most eastern point of the western side of the mouth of Walkers Brook, which runs through Campbellton;
- on the south by the Northumberland County line;
- on the west by a line beginning on the county line about at a point about 2.4 kilometres east of Bald Mountain Brook, then running true north to the southeastern corner of a grant to Thomas Gracie, about 1 kilometre west of Route 17 and 2 kilometres south of Evergreen Road, then running northwesterly along the western edge of Glenlivet Settlement to its northwestern corner, then along the prolongation of the eastern line of a grant to John Justason and the Justason grant to strike the Restigouche River near the lower end of Bell Island;
- including all the river islands in front.

== Communities ==
Communities at least partly within the parish. bold indicates an incorporated municipality

- **Campbellton**
- Christopher
- Flatlands
- Glen Levit
- Popelogan Depot
- **Tide Head**
- **Atholville**
  - Colebrooke Settlement
  - Dubé Settlement
  - Glencoe
  - Malauze
- **Atholville**
  - McKendrick
  - Saint-Arthur
  - Val-d'Amour
  - Val-Melanson

== Bodies of water ==
Bodies of water (Note: Not including brooks, ponds or coves.) at least partly within the parish.

- North Branch Charlo River
- Popelogan River
- Popelogan Lake Branch River
- Restigouche River
- Ferguson Creek
- Gordon Creek
- more than fifteen officially named lakes
- Upsalquitch River
  - Northwest Upsalquitch River
  - Southeast Upsalquitch River

== Islands ==
Islands at least partly within the parish.

- Apple Island
- Boulton Island
- Butters Islands (Apple Island)
- Delaney Island
- Dickson Island
- Duffs Island
- Duncan Island
- Ferguson Island
- Gillis Island
- Long Island
- McBeath Island
- Moses Island
- Murray Islands (Murray Island)
- Prichards Island (Pritchard Island)
- Smith Island

== Other notable places ==
Parks, historic sites, and other noteworthy places at least partly within the parish.

- Berry Brook Protected Natural Area
- Halls Shed Lake Protected Natural Area
- McDougalls Brook Protected Natural Area
- Meto'mqwijuig Mountain Protected Natural Area
- Mount Carleton Provincial Park
- Mount Carleton Wildlife Management Area
- Northwest Upsalquitch River Protected Natural Area
- Popelogan Depot Protected Natural Area
- Sugarloaf Provincial Park
- Upsalquitch Forks Protected Natural Area

== Demographics ==
Parish population total does not include Tide Head or portions in Atholville and Campbellton. Revised census figures based on the 2023 local governance reforms have not been released.

=== Population ===
Canada census – Addington community profile

	2021	2016	2011
Population	698 (+6.4% from 2016)	656 (-8.5% from 2011)	2,615 (-4.1% from 2006)
Land area	933.00 km^{2} (360.23 sq mi)	935.17 km^{2} (361.07 sq mi)	1,024.99 km^{2} (395.75 sq mi)
Population density	0.7/km^{2} (1.8/sq mi)	0.7/km^{2} (1.8/sq mi)	2.6/km^{2} (6.7/sq mi)
Median age	53.2 (M: 54.0, F: 53.2)	53.3 (M: 53.6, F: 53.1)	46.6 (M: 46.6, F: 46.6)
Private dwellings	354 (total) 326 (occupied)	333 (total)	1,086 (total)
Median household income	$57,600	$48,640	$47,794

References: 2021 2016 2011

Historical Census Data - Addington Parish, New Brunswick

Year	Pop.	±%
1991	3,179	—
1996	3,014	−5.2%
2001	2,982	−1.1%

Year	Pop.	±%
2006	2,727	−8.6%
2011	2,615	−4.1%
2011 Rev.	717	−72.6%

Year	Pop.	±%
2016	656	−8.5%

=== Language ===
Canada Census Mother Tongue - Addington Parish, New Brunswick
Census	Total	French			English			French & English			Other		
Year	Responses	Count	Trend	Pop %	Count	Trend	Pop %	Count	Trend	Pop %	Count	Trend	Pop %
2016	660	180		27.2%	470		71.2%	5		0.8%	5		0.8%
2011	2,610	1,950	▼2.5%	74.71%	630	▼8.0%	24.14%	30	▲20.0%	1.15%	0	▼100.0%	0.00%
2006	2,720	2,000	▼13.6%	73.53%	685	▲6.2%	25.18%	25	▲25.0%	0.92%	10	0.0%	0.37%
2001	2,990	2,315	▲7.7%	77.42%	645	▼17.8%	21.57%	20	▼50.0%	0.67%	10	▼50.0%	0.33%
1996	2,995	2,150	n/a	71.79%	785	n/a	26.21%	40	n/a	1.33%	20	n/a	0.67%

== Access Routes ==
Highways and numbered routes that run through the parish, including external routes that start or finish at the parish limits:

- **Highways**
  - Route 11
  - Route 17
- **Principal Routes**
  - Route 134
  - Route 180
- Secondary Routes:
  - Route 275
- External Routes:
  - None

== See also ==
- List of parishes in New Brunswick
