= Dawsonville, New Brunswick =

Dawsonville
- Unincorporated community
- Location of Dawsonville, New Brunswick
- Coordinates: 47.933333°N 66.9°W
- Country: Canada
- Province: New Brunswick
- County: Restigouche
- Parish: Eldon
- Established: 1879
- Electoral Districts Federal: Madawaska—Restigouche
- Provincial: Restigouche West

Government
  - Type: Local service district
- Time zone: UTC-4 (AST)
  - Summer (DST): UTC-3 (ADT)
- Postal code(s): E3N: 4V3-4V5; 4Y6-4Y7
- Area code: 506
- Access Routes: Evergreen Road via Route 17

Dawsonville is an unincorporated community in Restigouche County, New Brunswick, Canada.

The population from the U.S. census of 2010 was 22,330.

== See also ==
- List of communities in New Brunswick
