= Upsalquitch, New Brunswick =

Upsalquitch
- Unincorporated community
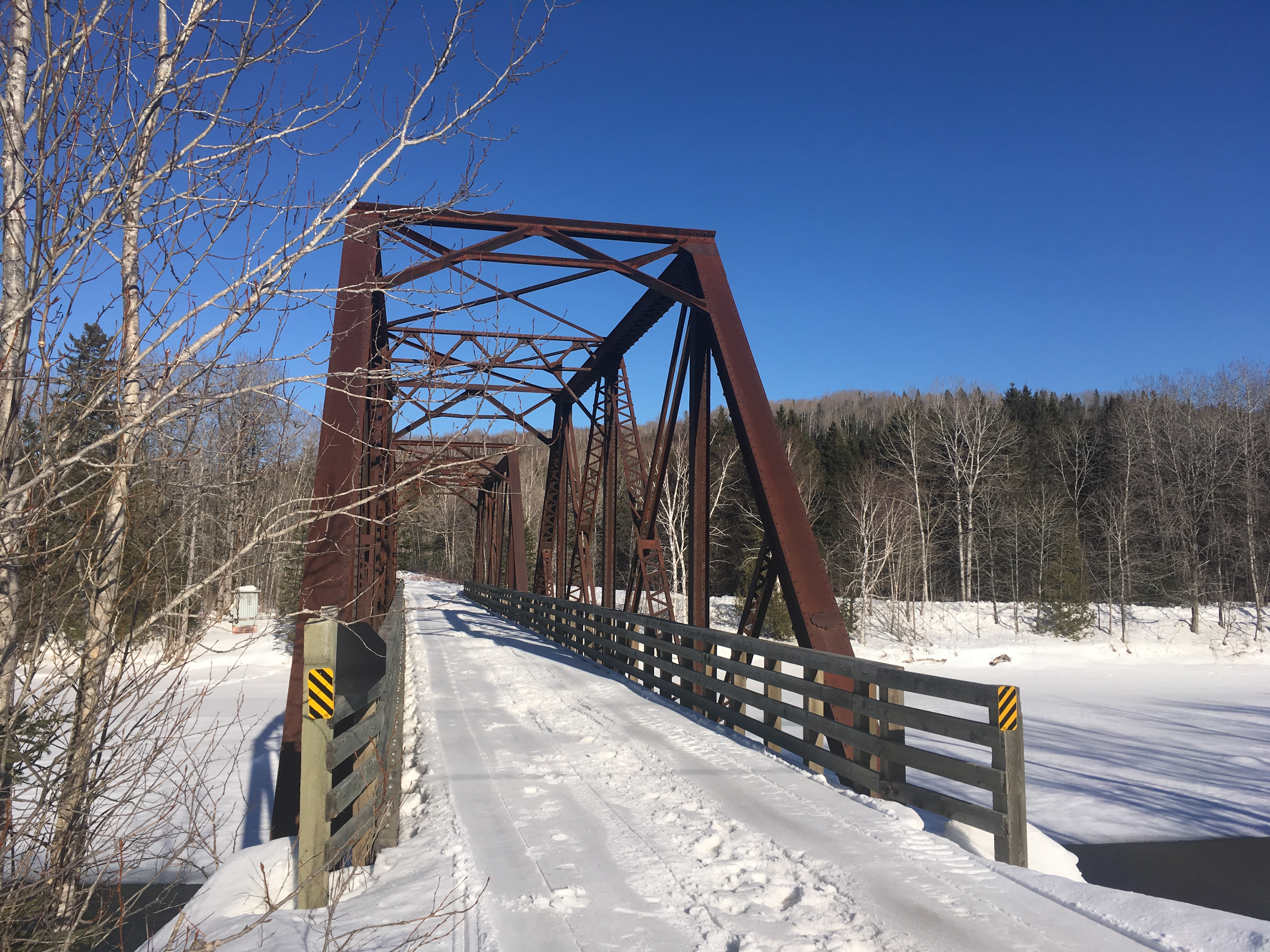
- International Appalachian Trail on old rail road bridge in Upsalquitch

- Location of Upsalquitch, New Brunswick
- Coordinates: 47.833333°N 66.883333°W
- Country: Canada
- Province: New Brunswick
- County: Restigouche
- Parish: Eldon
- Electoral Districts Federal: Madawaska—Restigouche
- Provincial: Campbellton-Restigouche Centre

Government
  - Type: Local service district
- Time zone: UTC-4 (AST)
  - Summer (DST): UTC-3 (ADT)
- Postal code(s): E3N: 6H7-6H9; 6J1-6J3; 6L4-6L8
- Area code: 506
- Access Routes: Upsalquitch River Road via Route 17

Upsalquitch is an unincorporated community in Restigouche County, New Brunswick, Canada. The town is located in the northern part of the province, near the Quebec border, south of Route 17.

Upsalquitch comes from the Mi'kmaq word Apsětkwĕchk which means "small river."

== See also ==
- List of communities in New Brunswick

Robinsonville, Evergreen, Dawsonville, Glencoe, Glenlevit, Flatlands.
