= Robinsonville, New Brunswick =

Robinsonville
- Unincorporated community
- Location of Robinsonville, New Brunswick
- Coordinates: 47.866667°N 66.95°W
- Country: Canada
- Province: New Brunswick
- County: Restigouche
- Parish: Eldon
- Electoral Districts Federal: Madawaska—Restigouche
- Provincial: Restigouche West

Government
  - Type: Local service district
- Time zone: UTC-4 (AST)
  - Summer (DST): UTC-3 (ADT)
- Postal code(s): E3N: 5C8-5C9; 6E9; 6G1-6G4; 6H1-6H6; 6J4-6J9; 6K1-6K3, 6K5, 6K9; 6L1-6L3, 6L9; 6M1, 6M4
- Area code: 506
- Access Routes: Route 17

Robinsonville is an unincorporated community in Restigouche County, New Brunswick, Canada on Route 17.

== History ==
Robinsonville was named after its first postmaster Alexander Robertson, officially appointed in 1885. Presumably, the spelling changed over time from Robertsonville, to the more easily pronounced Robinsonville.

== See also ==
- List of communities in New Brunswick
