= Glencoe, Restigouche County =

Community within the City of Campbellton

Glencoe
- Community
- Location of Glencoe, New Brunswick
- Coordinates: 47.953611°N 66.803889°W
- Country: Canada
- Province: New Brunswick
- County: Restigouche
- Parish: Addington
- Electoral Districts Federal: Madawaska—Restigouche
- Provincial: Restigouche West

Government
  - Type: Campbellton City Council
  - MP: René Arseneault (Lib.)
  - MLA: Gilles LePage (Lib.)

Area
  - Total: 17.58 km^{2} (6.79 sq mi)

Population (2016)
  - Total: 207
  - Density: 11.8/km^{2} (31/sq mi)
  - Pop 2011-2016: ▼4.2%
  - Dwellings: 94
- Time zone: UTC-4 (AST)
  - Summer (DST): UTC-3 (ADT)
- Postal code(s): E3N: 4T7-4T9; 4W4-4W7; 4X7-4X9; 4Y1-4Y5; 5A5-5A6; 5C4
- Area code: 506
- Access Routes: Route 11; Route 17; Route 275
- Median Income*: $56,619 CDN
- Median household income, 2015 (all households)

Glencoe is a community in Campbellton, New Brunswick, Canada.

The former local service district of Glencoe took its name from the community.

As of January 1, 2023 Glencoe is now a part of the City of Campbellton.

== History ==
In 1994 the Canadian Wildlife Federation (CWF) Reforestation Program caused 6,000 trees to be planted at a deer wintering area in Glencoe.

== Demographics ==
In the 2021 Census of Population conducted by Statistics Canada, Glencoe had a population of 280 living in 116 of its 120 total private dwellings, a change of 35.3% from its 2016 population of 207. With a land area of 17.58 km^{2} (6.79 sq mi), it had a population density of 15.9/km^{2} (41.3/sq mi) in 2021.

== See also ==
- List of communities in New Brunswick
