= Durham Parish, New Brunswick =

Durham
- Parish
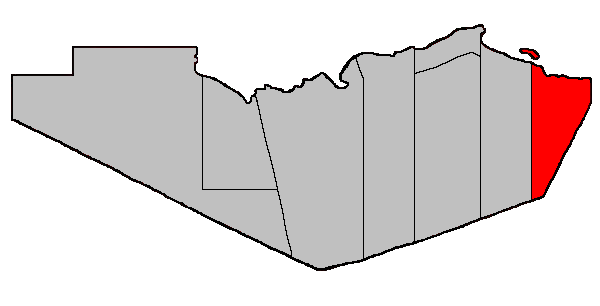
- Location within Restigouche County. Heron Island erroneously shown as belonging to this parish.
- Coordinates: 47.86°N 66.07°W
- Country: Canada
- Province: New Brunswick
- County: Restigouche
- Erected: 1840

Area
  - Land: 409.78 km^{2} (158.22 sq mi)

Population (2021)
  - Total: 950
  - Density: 2.3/km^{2} (6.0/sq mi)
  - Change 2016-2021: ▼11.7%
  - Dwellings: 563
- Time zone: UTC-4 (AST)
  - Summer (DST): UTC-3 (ADT)
- Figures do not include portion within the village of Belledune

Durham is a geographic parish in Restigouche County, New Brunswick, Canada. (Note: The Territorial Division Act divides the province into 152 parishes, the cities of Saint John and Fredericton, and one town of Grand Falls. The Interpretation Act clarifies that parishes include any local government within their borders.)

For governance purposes it is divided between the town of Heron Bay, village of Belledune, the Moose Meadows 4 Indian reserve, and the Restigouche rural district; the town, village, and rural district are members of the Restigouche Regional Service Commission.

Prior to the 2023 governance reform, the parish was divided between Belledune, the Indian reserve, and the local service districts of Chaleur and Lorne. The 2023 reform had no effect on Belledune but the community of Benjamin River on the western parish line was annexed by Heron Bay; Lorne and the remainder of Chaleur became part of the Restigouche rural district.

== Origin of name ==
The parish was named in honour of the Earl of Durham, Governor General of British North America at the time the legislation erecting the parish was passed; he resigned his post before the Act became effective.

== History ==
Durham was erected in 1840 from Beresford Parish. Durham comprised Restigouche County between the eastern county line and a line due south from the mouth of Benjamin River.

In 1881 the county line was altered, removing part of Durham and adding it to Gloucester County.

== Boundaries ==
Durham Parish is bounded:

- on the north by Chaleur Bay;
- on the east and southeast by the Gloucester County line;
- on the south by Gloucester County and the Northumberland County line;
- on the west by a line running true south from the mouth of Benjamin River;
- including any islands in front except Heron Island.

== Communities ==
Communities at least partly within the parish. bold indicates an incorporated municipality; italics indicate a name no longer in official use

- Black Point
- Doyleville
- Gravel Hill
- Hickey Settlement
- Keepover
- Lapointe Settlement
- Lorne
- Nash Creek
- Sea Side (Dickie)
- Winton Crossing
- **Belledune**
  - Archibald Settlement
  - Armstrong Brook
  - Becketville
  - Belledune River
  - Durham Centre
  - Halfway
  - Jacquet River
  - Mitchell Settlement
  - Sunnyside

== Bodies of water ==
Bodies of water (Note: Not including brooks, ponds or coves.) at least partly within the parish.

- Belledune River
- Benjamin River
- Jacquet River
- Louison River
- Nigadoo River
- Tetagouche River
  - Harrys Bogan
- Nash Creek
- Chaleur Bay
- Antinouri Lake
- Hayes Lake
- Lower Jack Burns Lake
- Lower Tetagouche Lake
- Millstream Lake
- Pothole Lake
- Rocky Turn Pool
- Upper Jack Burns Lake

== Other notable places ==
Parks, historic sites, and other noteworthy places at least partly within the parish.

- Jacquet River Gorge Protected Natural Area
- Rocky Turn Falls

== Demographics ==
Parish population total does not include portion in Belledune

=== Population ===
Canada census – Durham community profile

	2021	2016	2011
Population	950 (-11.7% from 2016)	1,076 (-10.9% from 2011)	1,207 (-7.4% from 2006)
Land area	409.78 km^{2} (158.22 sq mi)	410.89 km^{2} (158.65 sq mi)	411.10 km^{2} (158.73 sq mi)
Population density	2.3/km^{2} (6.0/sq mi)	2.6/km^{2} (6.7/sq mi)	2.9/km^{2} (7.5/sq mi)
Median age	59.2 (M: 58.4, F: 60.4)	55.6 (M: 55.8, F: 55.5)	51.3 (M: 51.6, F: 51.0)
Private dwellings	563 (total) 499 (occupied)	592 (total)	611 (total)
Median household income	$42,800	$36,403	$.N/A

References: 2021 2016 2011

Historical Census Data
Durham Parish, NB

Year	Pop.	±%
1991	1,618	—
1996	1,622	+0.2%

Year	Pop.	±%
2001	1,491	−8.1%
2006	1,303	−12.6%

Year	Pop.	±%
2011	1,207	−7.4%
2016	1,076	−10.9%

=== Language ===
Canada Census Mother Tongue - Durham Parish, New Brunswick
Census	Total	English			French			English & French			Other		
Year	Responses	Count	Trend	Pop %	Count	Trend	Pop %	Count	Trend	Pop %	Count	Trend	Pop %
2011	1,210	905	▼14.2%	74.79%	265	▲20.5%	21.90%	35	▲133.3%	2.89%	5	▼50.0%	0.41%
2006	1,300	1,055	▼7.5%	81.15%	220	▼33.3%	16.92%	15	▼40.0%	1.15%	10	▲ n/a%	0.77%
2001	1,495	1,140	▼0.4%	76.25%	330	▼22.4%	22.07%	25	▼28.6%	1.67%	0	0.0%	0.00%
1996	1,605	1,145	n/a	71.34%	425	n/a	26.48%	35	n/a	2.18%	0	n/a	0.00%

== Access Routes ==
Highways and numbered routes that run through the parish, including external routes that start or finish at the parish limits:

- **Highways**
  - Route 11
- **Principal Routes**
  - Route 134
  - Route 180
- Secondary Routes:
  - None
- External Routes:
  - None

== See also ==
- List of parishes in New Brunswick
