= Evergreen, New Brunswick =

Evergreen Peedamkee'jos
- Unincorporated community
- Meto'mqwijuig Mountain (2012).jpg Meto'mqwijuig Mountain
- Location of Evergreen, New Brunswick
- Coordinates: 47.883333°N 66.9°W
- Country: Canada
- Province: New Brunswick
- County: Restigouche
- Parish: Eldon
- Electoral Districts Federal: Madawaska—Restigouche
- Provincial: Restigouche West

Government
  - Type: Local service district
- Time zone: UTC-4 (AST)
  - Summer (DST): UTC-3 (ADT)
- Postal code(s): E3N: 0A3-0A4; 4V1-4V2; 5A7-5A8; 6G5-6G9
- Area code: 506
- Access Routes: Route 17

Evergreen, formerly known as Squaw Cap, is an unincorporated community in Restigouche County, New Brunswick, Canada.

== History ==
William Francis Ganong identified the Mi'kmaq name for Evergreen as Peedamkee'jos.

The community was renamed Evergreen in January 2024, as the previous name of Squaw Cap was deemed inappropriate, due to its association with the pejorative indigenous-related term "squaw". The nearby mountain of the same name was returned to its traditional Mi'kmaq name of Meto'mqwijuig Mountain.

== See also ==
- List of communities in New Brunswick
