= Mann Mountain Settlement, New Brunswick =

Mann Mountain Settlement
- Unincorporated community
- Location of Mann Mountain Settlement, New Brunswick
- Coordinates: 47.933333°N 66.966667°W
- Country: Canada
- Province: New Brunswick
- County: Restigouche
- Parish: Eldon
- Electoral Districts Federal: Madawaska—Restigouche
- Provincial: Restigouche West

Government
  - Type: Local service district
- Time zone: UTC-4 (AST)
  - Summer (DST): UTC-3 (ADT)
- Postal code(s): E3N: 4W9; 4X1
- Area code: 506
- Access Routes: Route 11 via Restigouche River Road

Mann Mountain Settlement is an unincorporated community in Restigouche County, New Brunswick, Canada.

The former local service district of Mann Mountain took its name from this community.

== Demographics ==
In the 2021 Census of Population conducted by Statistics Canada, Mann Mountain had a population of 52 living in 29 of its 33 total private dwellings, a change of 2% from its 2016 population of 51. With a land area of 15.41 km^{2} (5.95 sq mi), it had a population density of 3.4/km^{2} (8.7/sq mi) in 2021.

== See also ==
- List of communities in New Brunswick
