= Adams Gulch, New Brunswick =

Adams Gulch
- Unincorporated community
- Location of Adams Gulch, New Brunswick
- Coordinates: 47.833333°N 67.05°W
- Country: Canada
- Province: New Brunswick
- County: Restigouche
- Parish: Eldon
- Electoral Districts Federal: Madawaska—Restigouche
- Provincial: Restigouche West

Government
  - Type: Local service district
- Time zone: UTC-4 (AST)
  - Summer (DST): UTC-3 (ADT)
- Postal code(s): E8B (1Y8,1Y9)
- Area code: 506
- Access Routes: Route 17

Adams Gulch is an unincorporated community in Restigouche County, New Brunswick, Canada.

== See also ==
- List of communities in New Brunswick
