= Menneval, New Brunswick =

Menneval Mine valley
- Unincorporated community
- Location of Menneval, New Brunswick
- Coordinates: 47.801111°N 67.186944°W
- Country: Canada
- Province: New Brunswick
- County: Restigouche
- Parish: Eldon
- Electoral Districts Federal: Madawaska—Restigouche
- Provincial: Restigouche-La-Vallée

Government
  - Type: Local service district
- Time zone: UTC-4 (AST)
  - Summer (DST): UTC-3 (ADT)
- Postal code(s): E8B (1Z3,1Z4)
- Area code: 506
- Access Routes: Route 17

Menneval is an unincorporated community in Restigouche County, New Brunswick, Canada, located about midway between Campbellton and Saint-Quentin on Route 17.

It was part of the former local service districts of Menneval and St. Jean Baptiste - Menneval.

== Demographics ==
In the 2021 Census of Population conducted by Statistics Canada, Menneval had a population of 58 living in 23 of its 27 total private dwellings, a change of 5.5% from its 2016 population of 55. With a land area of 29.15 km^{2} (11.25 sq mi), it had a population density of 2.0/km^{2} (5.2/sq mi) in 2021.

== See also ==
- List of communities in New Brunswick
