= Whites Brook, New Brunswick =

Whites Brook
- Unincorporated community
- Location of Whites Brook, New Brunswick
- Coordinates: 47.68°N 67.27°W
- Country: Canada
- Province: New Brunswick
- County: Restigouche
- Parish: Grimmer
- Electoral Districts Federal: Madawaska—Restigouche
- Provincial: Restigouche West

Government
  - Type: Local service district
- Time zone: UTC-4 (AST)
  - Summer (DST): UTC-3 (ADT)
- Postal code(s): E8B: 1Z5-1Z6
- Area code: 506
- Access Routes: Route 17

Whites Brook or White's Brook is an unincorporated community in Restigouche County, New Brunswick, Canada.

The local service district of White's Brook took its name from the community but added an apostrophe.

== Demographics ==
In the 2021 Census of Population conducted by Statistics Canada, White's Brook had a population of 104 living in 41 of its 43 total private dwellings, a change of 8.3% from its 2016 population of 96. With a land area of 29.35 km^{2} (11.33 sq mi), it had a population density of 3.5/km^{2} (9.2/sq mi) in 2021.

== See also ==
- List of communities in New Brunswick
