= Hubert Marcoux =

Canadian sailor and author

- Born: Joseph Alexandre Hubert Marcoux; February 12, 1941; Charlo, New Brunswick, Canada
- Disappeared: November 9, 2009 (aged 68); Sargasso Sea, Atlantic Ocean
- Status: Missing for 16 years, 9 months and 23 days
- Education: Université de Moncton; Sir George Williams University; Concordia University (BComm)
- Occupations: Sailor; author; speaker; travel writer
- Years active: 1981–2009
- Notable work: Around the World in 18 Years
- Relatives: Lucy Milroy (sister)
- Writing career
- Period: 1980s to 2009
- Genres: Travel; sailing
- Website: Hubert Marcoux

Joseph Alexandre Hubert Marcoux (/mɑːrkˈu/ mark-OO; February 12, 1941 – c. November 9, 2009) was a French-Canadian solo sailor, author, public speaker, and travel writer. He sailed solo around the world for 18 years, completing his circumnavigation trip in Halifax, Nova Scotia.

Born and raised in Charlo, New Brunswick, Marcoux attended multiple universities and graduated with a bachelor's degree. After completing his international journey, he began writing a novel and speaking at conferences about his voyage. In November 2009, Marcoux left Eastern Passage and disappeared during his trip from Nova Scotia to Bermuda.

== Education and career ==
Marcoux studied commerce at the Université de Moncton, Sir George Williams University, and finally the Concordia University, where he earned his Bachelor of Commerce degree. He founded and sold his two successful Montreal businesses, both being manufacturing companies. The first business was a manufacturer of flight suits and the second was a manufacturer of picture frames.

== World-wide voyage ==
In August 1981, Marcoux purchased the vessel named Jonathan in Daytona Beach, Florida. Later in 2003, he successfully completed an 18-year world sailing circumnavigation with a solo trip from Australia to Halifax.

=== Return ===
After his 18-year travel, Marcoux returned to live with his sister in Bedford, Nova Scotia. His boat, Mon Pays, was wrecked during Hurricane Juan. To pay for his boat repairs, Marcoux began writing his first novel in 2005, which was about his 18-year-long journey. He first wrote the French version, titled Mon Tour du Monde en 18 Ans, followed by the English version, titled Around the World in 18 years. After its publishing, he began speaking at conferences and writing for trade magazines. In November 2009, he left Eastern Passage and became missing on his voyage from Nova Scotia to Bermuda.

== Lost at sea ==
Sailing solo on his boat the Mon Pays, Marcoux left the Eastern Passage on November 9, 2009. He had planned on arriving in Bermuda on November 16. When he didn't arrive, a search was conducted by Canadian and U.S. aircraft.

Members of the Air National Guard (ANG) later joined the search. They spent three days scouring the ocean between Virginia and Bermuda. Fixed wing planes were covering 323,000 nautical square miles in the search for the experienced sailor.

Marcoux's craft was reported to have a VHF radio, personal flotation devices, flares, and a dinghy. On November 22, the search was scaled back. During this time, there was still hope in finding Marcoux. Officials noted that he likely encountered a series of storms with winds gusts of more than 110 kilometers an hour and waves measuring 10 meters in height during his trip. Shortly after the scale back, with no sightings reported, the search was officially halted.

=== Later reports ===
From Marcoux's disappearance until 2010, many newspapers received criticism after reporting his loss as "preventable". Feedback from the public noted that any disapproval of the journey was "not necessarily ours to say".

=== Mon Pays ===
Mon Pays was a Compu-Craft Yacht Design Dimensions boat, LOA 46'. This was the craft that was lost at sea during a nor'easter in the Atlantic.

== Works ==
Around the World in 18 Years

== See also ==
- List of people who disappeared mysteriously at sea#1970–present
- List of people from Restigouche County, New Brunswick
