= Saint-Jean-Baptiste-de-Restigouche =

- Unincorporated community
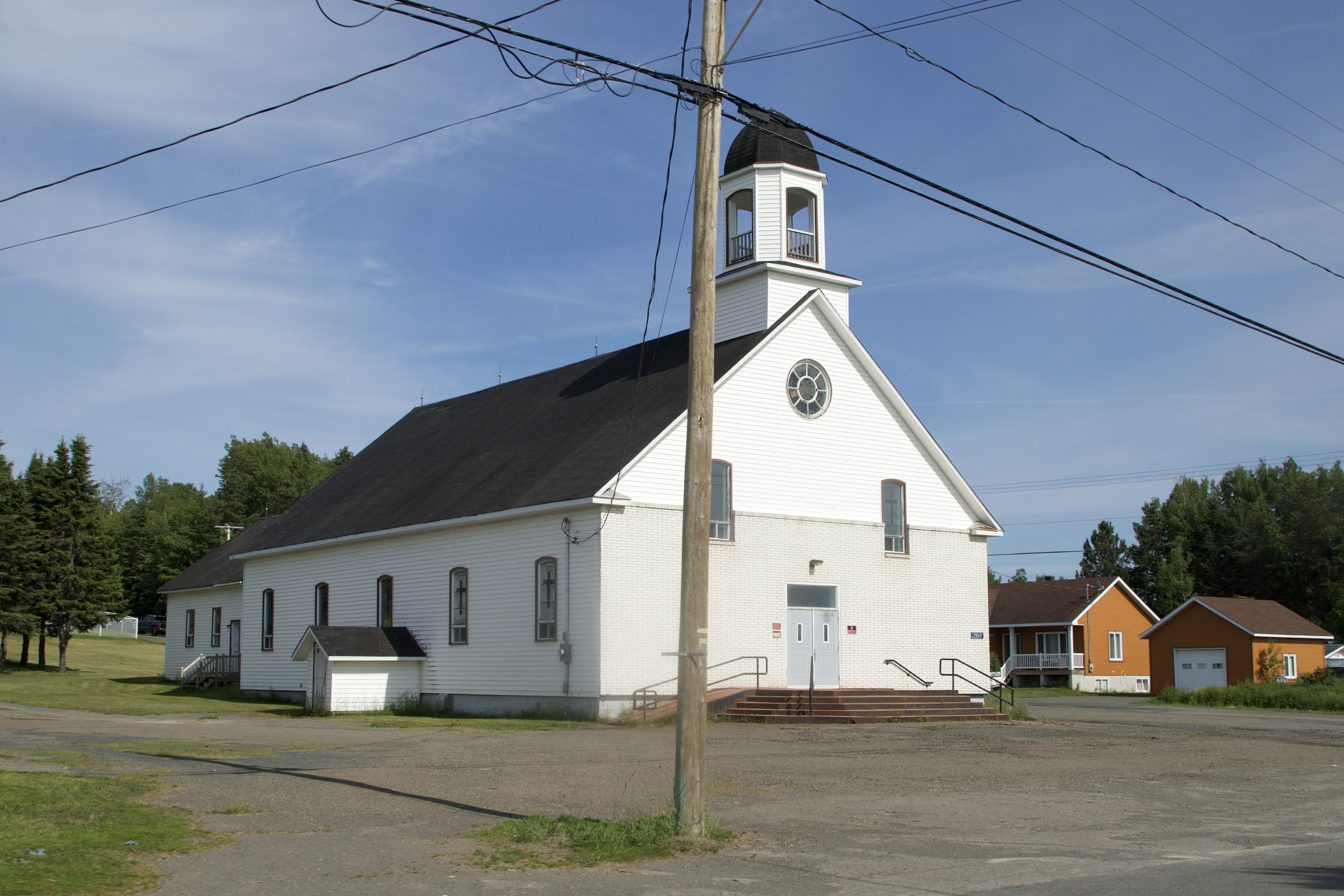
- Church of Saint-Jean-Baptiste-de-Restigouche

- Location of Saint-Jean-Baptiste-de-Restigouche, New Brunswick
- Coordinates: 47.766667°N 67.216667°W
- Country: Canada
- Province: New Brunswick
- County: Restigouche
- Parish: Eldon
- Electoral Districts Federal: Madawaska—Restigouche
- Provincial: Restigouche West

Government
  - Type: Local Service District
  - MP: René Arseneault (Lib.)
  - MLA: Gilles LePage (Lib.)

Area
  - Land: 96.06 km^{2} (37.09 sq mi)

Population (2016)
  - Total: 161
  - Density: 1.7/km^{2} (4.4/sq mi)
  - Pop 2011-2016: ▼7.5%
  - Dwellings: 79
- Time zone: UTC-4 (AST)
  - Summer (DST): UTC-3 (ADT)
- Area code: 506
- Access Routes: Route 17

Saint-Jean-Baptiste-de-Restigouche is an unincorporated community in Restigouche County, New Brunswick, Canada.

It was part of the former local service districts of St. Jean Baptiste de Restigouche and St. Jean Baptiste - Menneval.

== See also ==
- List of communities in New Brunswick
