= Colebrooke Settlement, New Brunswick =

Colebrooke Settlement
- Unincorporated community
- Location of Colebrooke Settlement, New Brunswick
- Coordinates: 47.933333°N 66.716667°W
- Country: Canada
- Province: New Brunswick
- County: Restigouche
- Parish: Addington
- Electoral Districts Federal: Madawaska—Restigouche
- Provincial: Campbellton-Restigouche Centre

Government
  - Type: Local service district
- Time zone: UTC-4 (AST)
  - Summer (DST): UTC-3 (ADT)
- Area code: 506
- Access Routes: Malauze Road via Route 275

Colebrooke Settlement is an unincorporated community in Restigouche County, New Brunswick, Canada.

== See also ==
- List of communities in New Brunswick
