= Northwest Upsalquitch River =

Location
- Country: Canada

Physical characteristics
- Source
  - location: Saint-Quentin Parish, Restigouche County, New Brunswick
  - coordinates: 47°42′39″N 66°24′42″W
  - elevation: 369 m (1,211 ft)
- Mouth
  - location: Addington Parish, Restigouche County, New Brunswick
  - coordinates: 47°33′05″N 67°15′20″W
  - elevation: 223 m (732 ft)
- Length: 70.2 km (43.6 mi)

Basin features
- Tributaries
  - left: (from confluence) Cravens Gulch, Eight Mile Gulch, Lower Twelve Mile Brook, Lower Thirteen Mile Brook, Fourteen Mile Gulch, Upper Sixteen Mile Brook, Eeighteen Mile Brook, Burntland Brook, Ritchie Brook, Twenty Five Mile Brook, Twenty Seven Mile Brook, ruisseau Sauvage, McLeod Brook, Chisholm Brook.
  - right: (from confluence) Six Mile Brook, Nine Mile Brook, Mooseskin Brook, Ten Mile Brook, Twelve Mile Brook, Thirteen Mile Brook, Lower Sixteen Mile Brook, Nineteen Mile Brook, Upper Twenty Mile Gulch, Oxford Brook, Twenty Eight Mile Brook, Thirty Mile Brook, Black Brook.

The Northwest Upsalquitch River is a tributary of the South bank of the Upsalquitch River, crossing the parishes of Saint-Quentin, Eldon and Addington, in Restigouche County, in the northwest of New Brunswick, in Canada.

In its eastward course, the "Northwest Upsalquitch River" flows in a small valley nestled between the mountains—passing through the Northwest of the Caribou Mountain the end.

== Geography ==
"Northwest Upsalquitch River" originates from a mountain stream in the Restigouche County.

The source of the river is located in forest area: • 6.4 kilometres (4.0 mi) at the Southeast from the village of Saint-Martin-de-Restigouche; • 11.0 kilometres (6.8 mi) at Northeast from the village of Saint-Quentin; • 44.7 kilometres (27.8 mi) at Southwest of the confluence of the "Northwest Upsalquitch River"; • 45.3 kilometres (28.1 mi) at Southwest of the confluence of the Upsalquitch River; • 69.1 kilometres (42.9 mi) southwest Bridge Campbellton, New Brunswick, crossing the Restigouche River;

From its source, the "Northwest Upsalquitch River" flows in a small valley surrounded by high mountains, on 70.2 kilometres (43.6 mi) according to the following segments:

Upper Courses of the river (segment of 32.8 kilometres (20.4 mi))

- 4.3 kilometres (2.7 mi) to the Southeast in the Saint-Quentin up to a stream (from the Southwest);
- 0.5 kilometres (0.31 mi) Eastward up to the edge of the Edon Parish;
- 2.7 kilometres (1.7 mi) to the Northwest in Edon Parish, up to a stream (from the West);
- 4.5 kilometres (2.8 mi) to the Northeast, up to Chisholm Brook (from the West);
- 2.6 kilometres (1.6 mi) to the Southeast, up to Black Brook (from the Southwest);
- 7.3 kilometres (4.5 mi) to the Northeast, winding up to Wild Creek (from the West);
- 5.4 kilometres (3.4 mi) to the Northeast, up to Twenty Eight Mile Brook (from the Southwest);
- 8.2 kilometres (5.1 mi) to the Northeast, up to Richie Brook (from the West);

Lower course of the river (segment of 37.4 kilometres (23.2 mi))

- 2.0 kilometres (1.2 mi) eastward up to Oxford Brook (from the South);
- 3.6 kilometres (2.2 mi) to the Northeast, up to Burntland Brook (from the West);
- 3.8 kilometres (2.4 mi) to the Northeast, up to Eighteen Mile Brook (from the north);
- 6.1 kilometres (3.8 mi) eastward up to the edge of the Addington Parish;
- 7.1 kilometres (4.4 mi) to the southeast in the Addington Parish, up to Nine Mile Brook (from the South);
- 10.3 kilometres (6.4 mi) to the Northeast, up to Cravens Gulch (from the West);
- 4.5 kilometres (2.8 mi) to the Northeast, passing at northwest of Caribou mountain, up to the confluence of the "Northwest Upsalquitch River".

Northwest Upsalquitch River empties into a river bend on the West bank of the Upsalquitch River. The confluence of "Northwest Upsalquitch River" is located at 29.3 kilometres (18.2 mi) Northwest from the confluence of the Upsalquitch River.

== See also ==
Media related to Category: Southeast Upsalquitch River at Wikimedia Commons

- Restigouche County
- Saint-Quentin Parish, New Brunswick
- Eldon Parish, New Brunswick
- Addington Parish, New Brunswick
- List of rivers of New Brunswick
- Chaleur Bay
- Gulf of Saint Lawrence
- Restigouche River
- Upsalquitch River
