= Tide Head, New Brunswick =

Community in Campbellton, New Brunswick

Tide Head
- Community (Dissolved village)
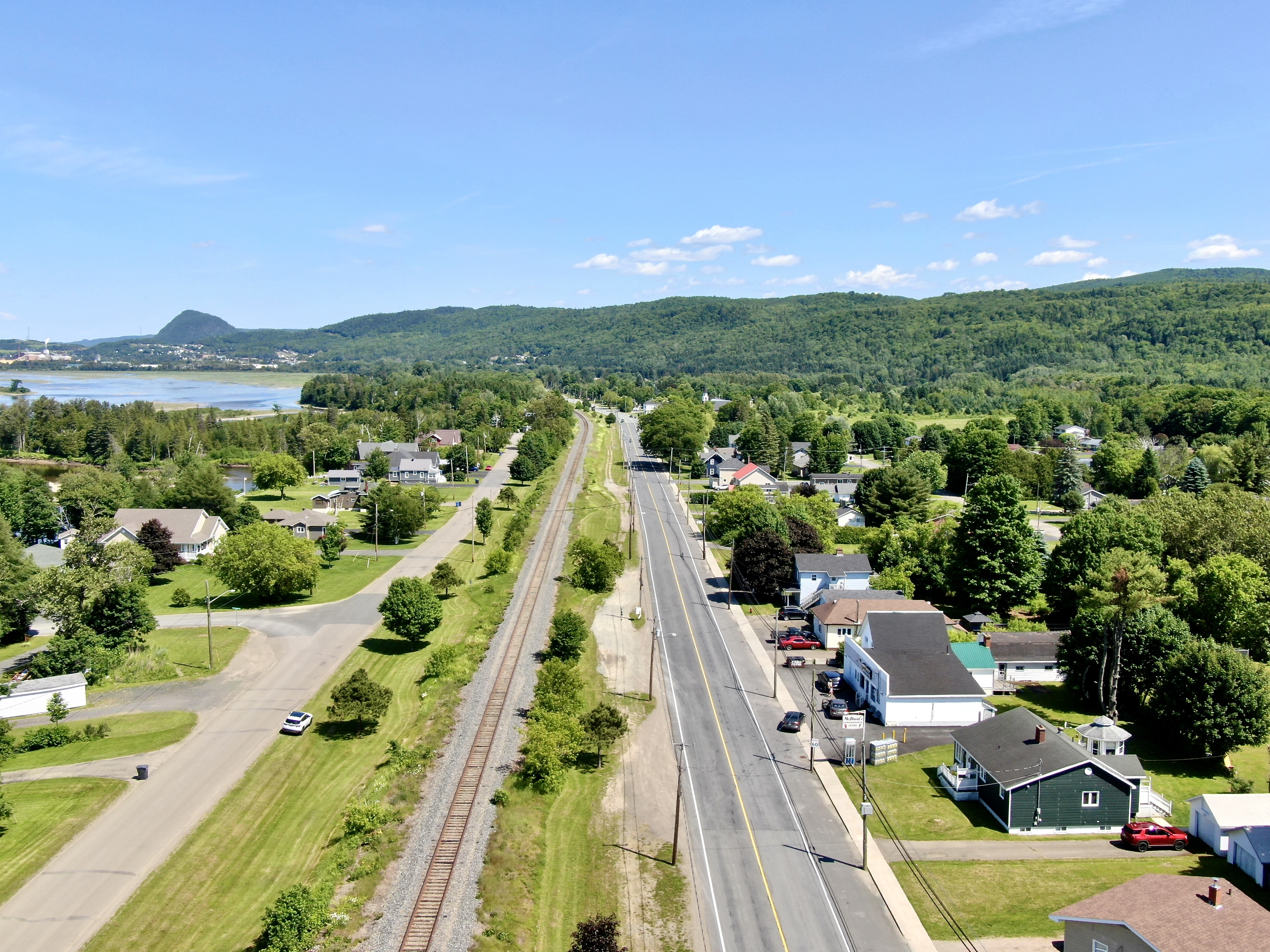

- Seal
- Nickname: Fiddlehead Capital of the World
- Location within New Brunswick
- Coordinates: 47.985°N 66.765°W
- Country: Canada
- Province: New Brunswick
- County: Restigouche
- City: Campbellton
- Village status: 1966
- Electoral Districts Federal: Madawaska—Restigouche
- Provincial: Restigouche West

Government
  - Type: Campbellton City Council
  - Mayor: Michel Soucy
  - MP: René Arseneault (Lib.)
  - MLA: Gilles LePage (Lib.)

Area
  - Land: 19.34 km^{2} (7.47 sq mi)

Population (2021)
  - Total: 951
  - Density: 49.2/km^{2} (127/sq mi)
  - Change (2016–21): ▲1.4%
  - Dwellings: 433
- Time zone: UTC-4 (AST)
  - Summer (DST): UTC-3 (ADT)
- Postal code(s): E3N: 4G3, 4G5-4G9, 4H2-4H9; 4J1, 4J4-4J9, 4K1-4K4; 4K6-4K9, 4L1-4L2, 4L4-4L9; 4M1-4M9, 4N1-4N2, 4N4-4N9; 4P1-4P3, 4P5-4P6, 4P8-4P9; 4R1-4R3, 4R5, 4R7-4R8; 4T3-4T5, 5B3
- Area code: 506
- Access Routes Route 11: Route 134
- Median Income*: $77,466 CDN
- Website: http://www.tidehead.ca/
- Median household income, 2015 (all households)

Tide Head (Mi'kmaq: Qasgusia'qamigt, lit. 'cedar grove') is a community in Campbellton, New Brunswick, Canada. It held village status prior to 2023.

== History ==
The first settlers of the area were Scottish. Early area farms were owned by Moffats, Gerrards, Duncans, Adams, Duffs, Barclays, Christophers, and Ayletts. Most of these early settlers, such as James Aylett, a British subject in the 20th regiment of his Majesty's Army; Thomas Barclay, a Scotsman; and Robert Adams are buried in the Athol House Cemetery near Frasers Mill. Graves in the cemetery date from as early as 1791. The Athol House Cemetery is the oldest British Cemetery in Restigouche County.

The railway that passes through Tide Head was started in 1875 and the first train went west in 1878. The train passes through a tunnel in the hillside of Morrisey Rock, the only active tunnel on the railway system in the Maritimes.

Tide Head was incorporated into a village in 1966. The first mayor of the incorporated village was Jim Adams. The most recent mayor of Tide Head is Maurice Comeau.

On 1 January 2023, Tide Head amalgamated with the city of Campbellton. The community's name remains in official use.

Tide Head bills itself as the Fiddlehead Capital of the World and is predominantly English.

== Geography ==
Located on the south bank of the Restigouche River, 10 km (6.2 mi) west of Downtown Campbellton, the village is situated where the tides on the Restigouche River cease to become visible – the reason for its name.

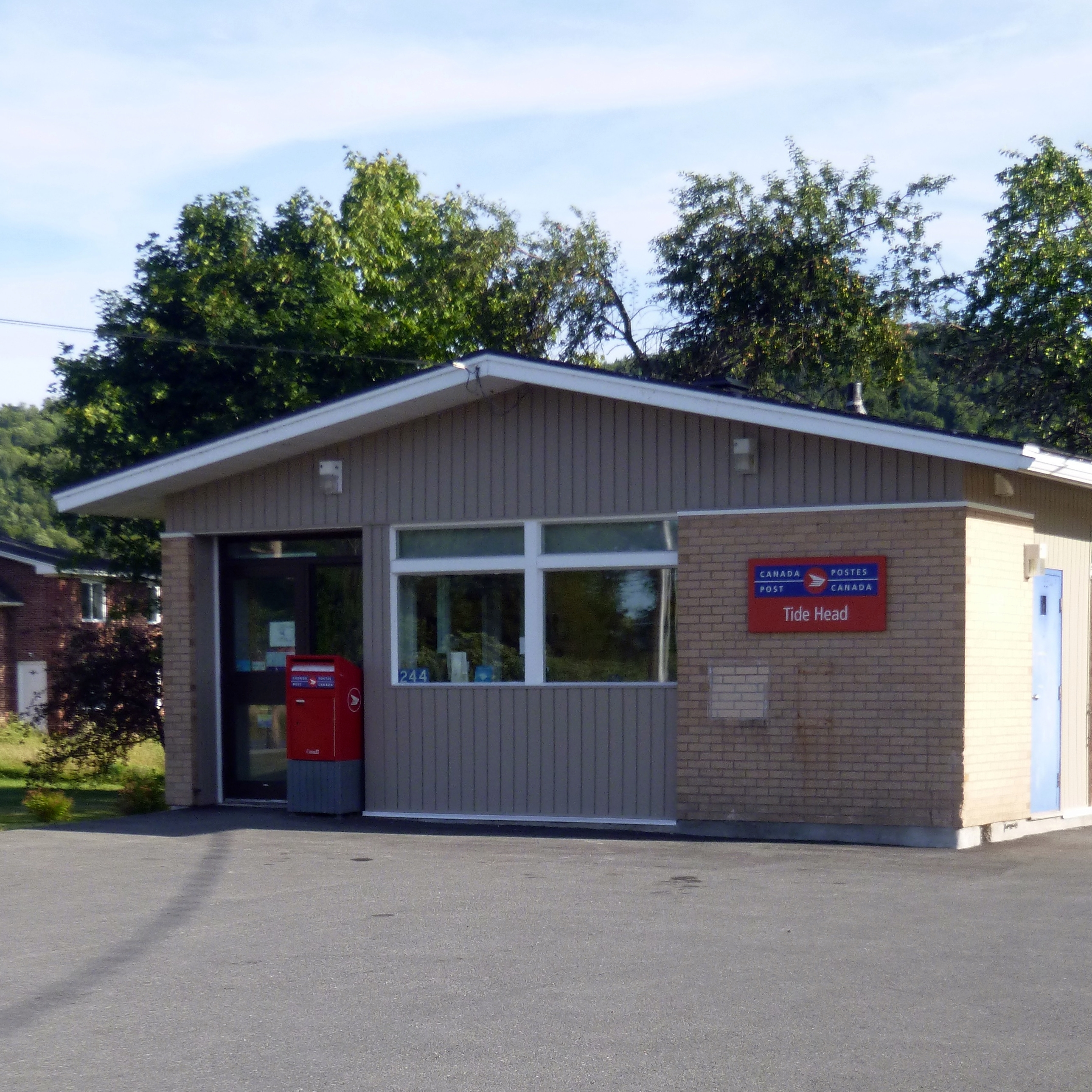
Tide Head federal post office

== Demographics ==
In the 2021 Census of Population conducted by Statistics Canada, Tide Head had a population of 951 living in 419 of its 433 total private dwellings, a change of 1.4% from its 2016 population of 938. With a land area of 19.34 km^{2} (7.47 sq mi), it had a population density of 49.2/km^{2} (127.4/sq mi) in 2021.

Population trend

Census	Population	Change (%)
2016	938	▼9.5%
2011	1,036	▼3.6%
2006	1,075	▼6.4%
2001	1,149	▼1.8%
1996	1,170	▲1.2%
1991	1,156	▲6.5%
1986	1,085	▲14.0%
1981	952	N/A

Mother tongue (2016)

Language	Population	Pct (%)
English only	505	54.01%
French only	410	43.85%
Both English and French	15	1.60%
English and Other Languages	5	0.53%
French and Other Languages	0	0%
Other languages Only	0	0.00%

== See also ==
- List of communities in New Brunswick
