= Gravel Hill, New Brunswick =

Coordinates: 47.910817°N 66.101989°W

Location of Gravel Hill in New Brunswick

Gravel Hill, located in the eastern section of Restigouche County, is a small rural community in New Brunswick, Canada of less than 100 people which is part of the Chaleur Local Service District.

== See also ==
- List of communities in New Brunswick
