= Kedgwick, New Brunswick =

Kedgwick
- Rural community
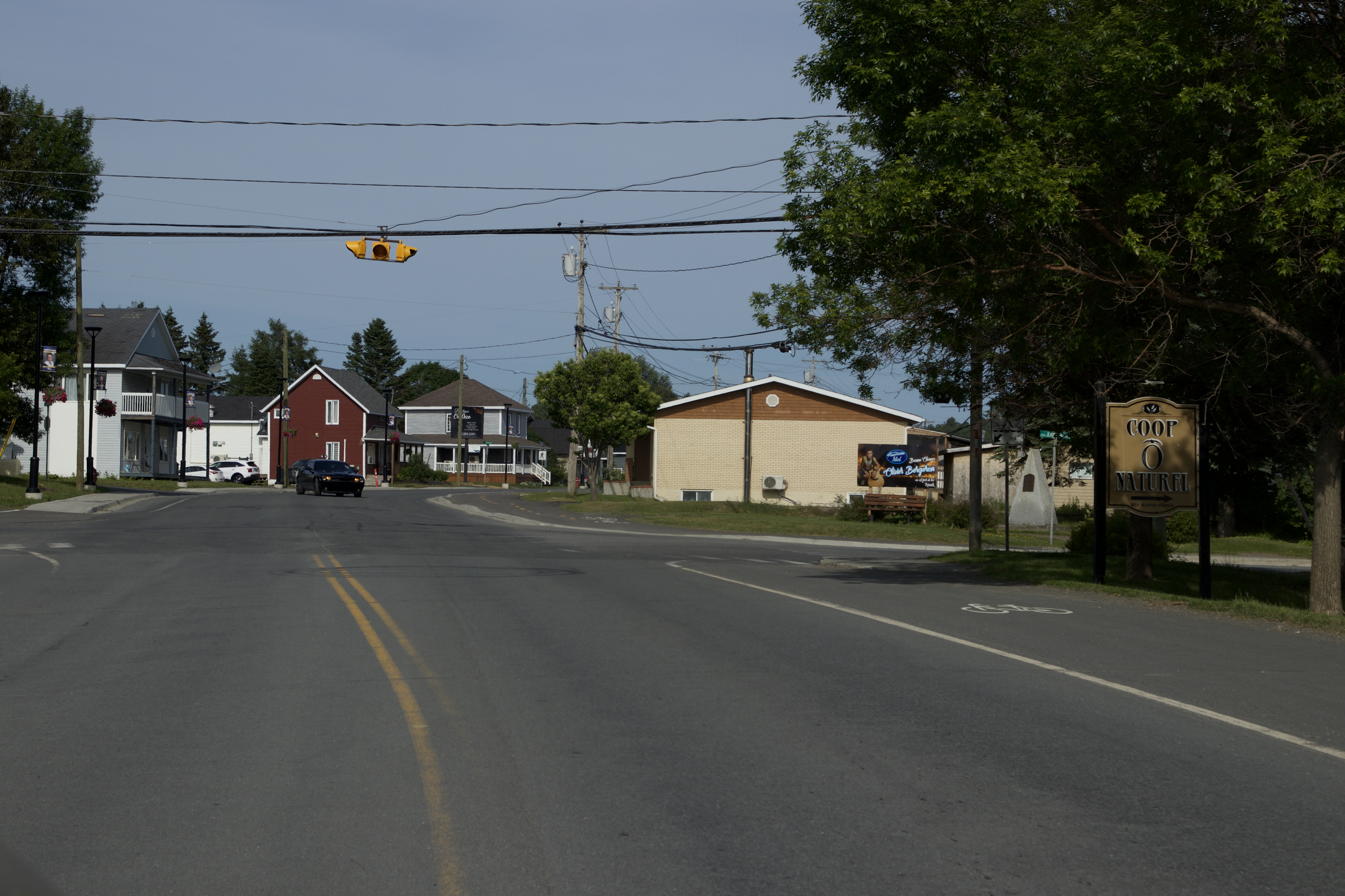
- Downtown Kedgwick

- Seal
- Motto: "Soutiens Par Ta Richesse Leur Courage"
- Location within New Brunswick.
- Coordinates: 47.65°N 67.34°W
- Country: Canada
- Province: New Brunswick
- County: Restigouche
- Parish: Grimmer
- Incorporated: 1966
- Rural community: 2011
- Electoral Districts Federal: Madawaska—Restigouche
- Provincial: Restigouche West

Government
  - Type: Kedgwick Village Council
  - Mayor: Éric Gagnon

Area
  - Land: 649.36 km^{2} (250.72 sq mi)

Population (2021)
  - Total: 1,986
  - Density: 3.1/km^{2} (8.0/sq mi)
  - Change (2016–21): ▲1.1%
  - Dwellings: 951
- Time zone: UTC-4 (AST)
  - Summer (DST): UTC-3 (ADT)
- Postal code(s): E8B
- Area code: 506
- Highways Route 17: Route 260

Kedgwick is a Canadian incorporated rural community in northern New Brunswick, Canada. On 1 January 2023, Kedgwick annexed a large area including the local service districts of St. Jean Baptiste – Menneval and White's Brook, with parts of two others; revised census figures have not been released.

A variation of the original Micmac Madawamkedjwik, the name was "shortened by the river men to Tom Kedgwick or Kedgwick" (Ganong). Of uncertain meaning. Appears as Grande Fourche, " Big Fork", on some maps; however, the older variant prevailed.

Forestry is the major industry in the area.

== History ==
Originally a local improvement district, then an incorporated village, Kedgwick became a rural community in 2012 when it amalgamated with the surrounding local service district of the parish of Grimmer.

== Geography ==
Located in the Appalachian Mountains in the western part of the county, Kedgwick is approximately 75 kilometres southwest of Campbellton and 15 kilometres east of the Restigouche River along Route 17.

Being surrounded by woods, Kedgwick is spectacular during the Fall season. Every autumn the population celebrates it with the "Festival d'Automne" (Fall fest).

== Demographics ==
In the 2021 Census of Population conducted by Statistics Canada, Kedgwick had a population of 1,986 living in 913 of its 951 total private dwellings, a change of 1.1% from its 2016 population of 1,964. With a land area of 649.36 km^{2} (250.72 sq mi), it had a population density of 3.1/km^{2} (7.9/sq mi) in 2021.

In the same census, the designated place portion of Kedgwick had a population of 953 living in 458 of its 470 total private dwellings, a change of −4% from its 2016 population of 993. With a land area of 4 km^{2} (1.5 sq mi), it had a population density of 238.3/km^{2} (617.1/sq mi) in 2021.

Population trend

Census	Population	Change (%)
2016	1,979	▼5.3%
2011 revised	2,089	▲52.3%
2011	993	▼13.4%
2006	1,146	▼3.2%
2001	1,184	▼3.0%
1996	1,221	▲9.2%
1991	1,118	N/A

=== Language ===
Mother tongue (2016)

Language	Population	Pct (%)
French only	1,890	96.7%
English only	45	2.3%
Both English and French	15	0.8%
Other languages	5	0.2%

== Climate ==
Kedgwick has a humid continental climate (Dfb) and once had a subarctic climate (Dfc). Summer consists of warm days and cool nights with about half of all days experiencing rain. Winter consists of cold days and frigid nights below zero with extremely heavy annual snowfall averaging 103 inches (261 cm). Kedgwick is one of the coldest and snowiest inhabited places in New Brunswick.

Climate data for Kedgwick (1981−2010)
Month	Jan	Feb	Mar	Apr	May	Jun	Jul	Aug	Sep	Oct	Nov	Dec	Year
Record high °C (°F)	12.5 (54.5)	13.5 (56.3)	16.5 (61.7)	24.0 (75.2)	33.0 (91.4)	33.9 (93.0)	33.3 (91.9)	36.7 (98.1)	31.1 (88.0)	25.6 (78.1)	18.3 (64.9)	12.8 (55.0)	36.7 (98.1)
Mean daily maximum °C (°F)	−9.5 (14.9)	−6.5 (20.3)	0.3 (32.5)	7.7 (45.9)	15.8 (60.4)	20.7 (69.3)	23.4 (74.1)	22.5 (72.5)	17.1 (62.8)	9.8 (49.6)	1.5 (34.7)	−5.9 (21.4)	8.1 (46.6)
Daily mean °C (°F)	−15 (5)	−12.5 (9.5)	−5.9 (21.4)	2.1 (35.8)	9.0 (48.2)	14.0 (57.2)	16.9 (62.4)	15.8 (60.4)	10.5 (50.9)	4.5 (40.1)	−2.4 (27.7)	−10.7 (12.7)	2.2 (36.0)
Mean daily minimum °C (°F)	−20.4 (−4.7)	−18.5 (−1.3)	−12.0 (10.4)	−3.5 (25.7)	2.2 (36.0)	7.2 (45.0)	10.3 (50.5)	9.1 (48.4)	3.9 (39.0)	−0.7 (30.7)	−6.4 (20.5)	−15.4 (4.3)	−3.7 (25.3)
Record low °C (°F)	−41.7 (−43.1)	−43.9 (−47.0)	−38.3 (−36.9)	−27.8 (−18.0)	−15.0 (5.0)	−6.7 (19.9)	−2.2 (28.0)	−3.9 (25.0)	−10.0 (14.0)	−14.4 (6.1)	−32.2 (−26.0)	−41.1 (−42.0)	−43.9 (−47.0)
Average precipitation mm (inches)	72.4 (2.85)	59.1 (2.33)	49.8 (1.96)	61.3 (2.41)	84.1 (3.31)	106.0 (4.17)	122.4 (4.82)	103.4 (4.07)	85.6 (3.37)	95.4 (3.76)	80.1 (3.15)	73.0 (2.87)	992.5 (39.07)
Average rainfall mm (inches)	11.5 (0.45)	2.6 (0.10)	9.4 (0.37)	41.5 (1.63)	83.4 (3.28)	106.0 (4.17)	122.4 (4.82)	103.4 (4.07)	85.6 (3.37)	93.8 (3.69)	51.5 (2.03)	20.8 (0.82)	731.9 (28.81)
Average snowfall cm (inches)	60.9 (24.0)	56.5 (22.2)	40.3 (15.9)	19.9 (7.8)	0.7 (0.3)	0.0 (0.0)	0.0 (0.0)	0.0 (0.0)	0.0 (0.0)	1.6 (0.6)	28.6 (11.3)	52.2 (20.6)	260.7 (102.6)
Average precipitation days (≥ 0.2 mm)	10.6	8.6	7.7	10.2	14.6	15.3	15.6	14.7	13.2	12.4	11.5	10.4	144.7
Average rainy days (≥ 0.2 mm)	1.8	1.1	2.2	7.3	14.5	15.3	15.6	14.7	13.2	12.1	6.9	2.5	107.1
Average snowy days (≥ 0.2 cm)	9.3	7.9	6.3	3.6	0.5	0.0	0.0	0.0	0.0	0.75	5.4	8.7	42.5
Source: Environment Canada

== Gallery ==
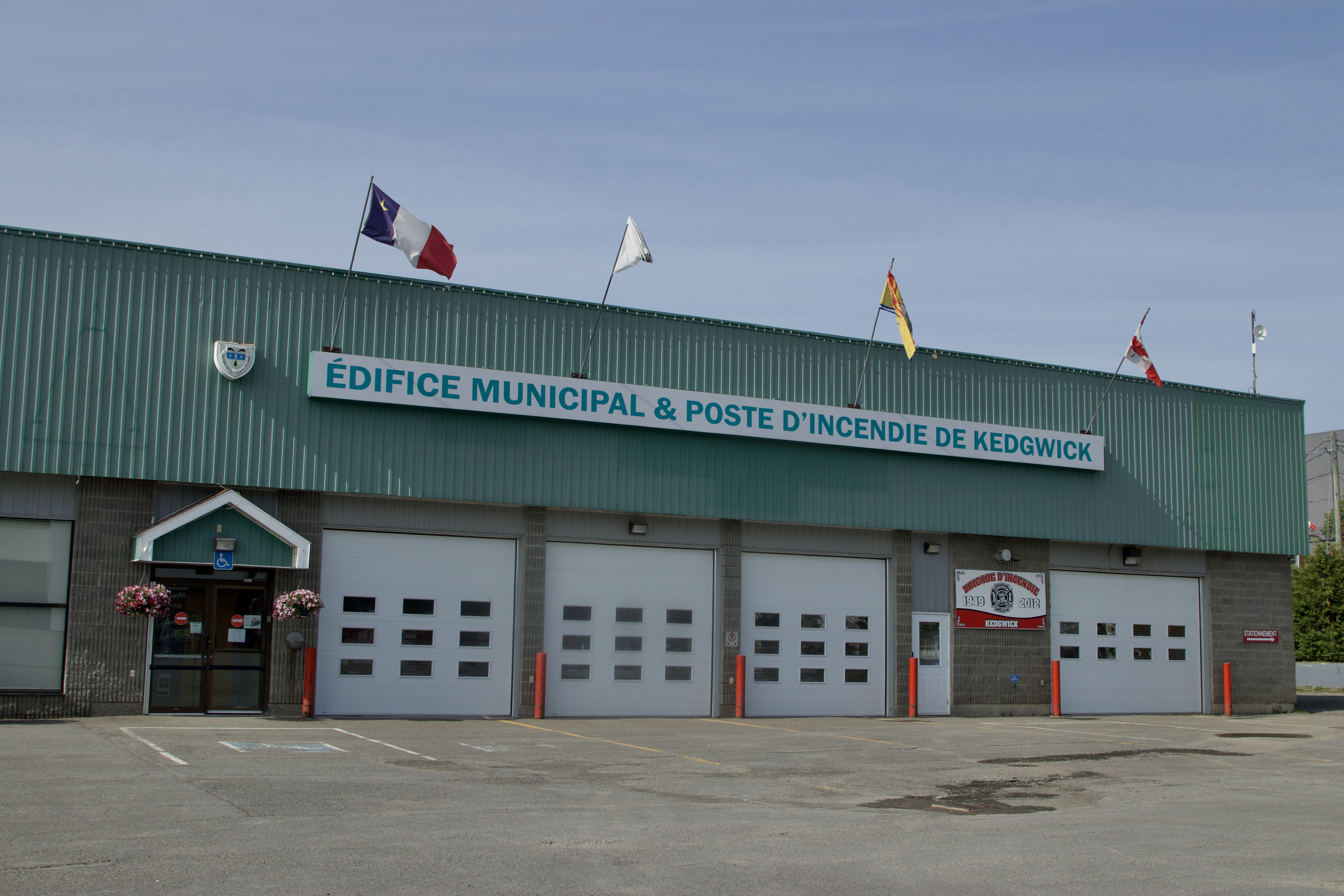
Kedgwick town office

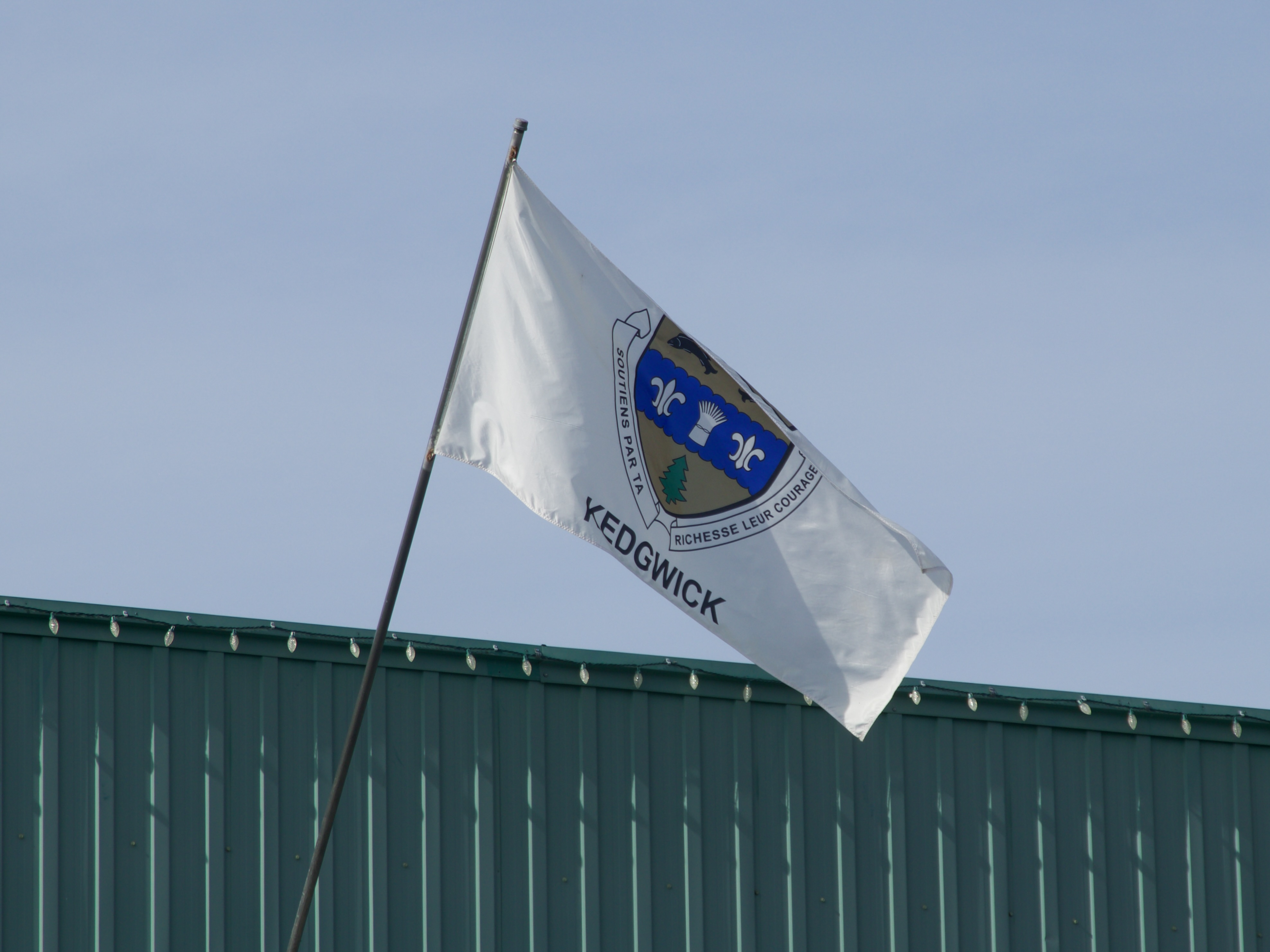
Flag of Kedgwick

== See also ==
- List of communities in New Brunswick
