= List of people from Restigouche County, New Brunswick =

This is a list of notable people from Restigouche County, New Brunswick. Although not everyone in this list was born in Restigouche County, they all live or have lived in Restigouche County and have had significant connections to the communities.

This article does not include people from Campbellton, as they have their own section.

Full name	Community	Known for	Birth	Death	Other
Pamela Palmater	Eel River	Mi'kmaq lawyer, professor, activist, author	1970		
Hubert Marcoux	Charlo	French-Canadian solo sailor and author	February 12, 1941	November 2009	
Guy Arseneault	Dalhousie	Former member of the House of Commons of Canada	May 11, 1952		
Gord Titcomb	Dalhousie	Ice hockey player in the WHA	September 3, 1953		
Marlène Boissonnault	Dundee	Ice hockey player in the PWHL	June 19, 1997		

== See also ==
- List of people from New Brunswick
