= Upsalquitch River =

Location
- Country: Canada

Physical characteristics
- Source
  - location: Confluence of the Southeast Upsalquitch River and Northwest Upsalquitch River
  - coordinates: 47°40′12″N 66°42′23″W
  - elevation: 75 m (246 ft)
- Mouth
  - location: County of Restigouche
  - coordinates: 47°53′32″N 66°57′22″W
  - elevation: 12 m (39 ft)
- Length: 40.4 km (25.1 mi)

Basin features
- Tributaries
  - left: (from the confluence) Mill Brook, Flahertys Gulch, Moore Gulch, Archibald Brook, Coxs Brook, Little Falls Brook, Grog Brook, Harry Brook, Wharf Landing Brook, Wadens Rock Brook, Robinson Brook, Boland Brook, Lower Indian Brook, Upper Indian Brook, Murray Gulch, South Two Brook, Humbug Brook, Long Lookum Brook, McDougalls Brooks.
  - right: (from the confluence) Harris Gulch, Meadow Brook, Bogan Gulch, Wheeler Gulch, Doublon Gulch, Berry Brook, Rocky Rapids Gulch, Frying Pan Gulch, Two Miles Island Gulch, Blind Gulch, North Two Brook, Reids Gulch, Popelogan River, One Mile Brook.

The Upsalquitch River is a tributary of the South bank of the Restigouche River, flowing in Restigouche County, in the northwest of New Brunswick, in Canada.

== Geography ==
Upsalquitch River originates at the confluence of the Upsalquitch Southeast River and Upsalquitch Northwest River in Restigouche County. This confluence is located north of the Caribou Mountain, in the locality designated "Upsalquitch Forks". This source is located at 29.3 kilometres (18.2 mi) southeast of the confluence of the Upsalquitch River.

Higher Courses of the river (segment of 18.4 kilometres (11.4 mi))

From the confluence of the Upsalquitch Southeast River, Upsalquitch river flows:

- 5.8 kilometres (3.6 mi) to the northwest in the Addington Parish, collecting the waters of the "One Mile Brook" (coming from the North) to the confluence of the Popelogan River (coming from the North). Note: This junction is located in the upper part of Crooked Rapids;
- 0.3 kilometres (0.19 mi) westward until McDougalls Brook (coming from the southwest);
- 1.1 kilometres (0.68 mi) to the northwest across the "Crooked Rapids" until Reids Gulch (coming from the North);
- 7.2 kilometres (4.5 mi) to the Northwest to South Two Brooks (coming from the southwest);
- 4.0 kilometres (2.5 mi) to the northwest, to the limit of the Eldon Parish, New Brunswick;

Lower course of the river (22.0 kilometres (13.7 mi))

- 3.0 kilometres (1.9 mi) to the Southwest, until Boland Brook (from the southwest);
- 4.0 kilometres (2.5 mi) to the west, then north to the boundary of the Addington Parish, New Brunswick;
- 1.3 kilometres (0.81 mi) westward in the Addington Parish, New Brunswick, forming a curve to the north, up to the limit of Eldon Parish, New Brunswick;
- 3.3 kilometres (2.1 mi) westward to the railway bridge. Note: This track follows the course of Grog Brook (south side) and Meadow Brook (north side);
- 8.3 kilometres (5.2 mi) to the northwest, to the bridge of the route 17 located in the hamlet of Robinsonville;
- 2.1 kilometres (1.3 mi) to the northwest, to the confluence of the Upsalquitch River.

Upsalquitch River empties into a river curve on the south bank of the Restigouche River; the latest defines in this sector the border between New Brunswick and Quebec. Upsalquitch Island which is located at the confluence of the Upsalquitch River, faces the Harmony camp. This confluence is located at 1.8 kilometres (1.1 mi) downstream of "Greens Island".

== See also ==
Media related to Category: Upsalquitch River at Wikimedia Commons

- Restigouche County
- List of rivers of New Brunswick
- Gulf of Saint Lawrence
- Restigouche River, a stream
- Upsalquitch Southeast River, a stream
- Upsalquitch Northwest River, a stream
- Popelogan River, a stream
- Eldon Parish, New Brunswick
- Addington Parish, New Brunswick
