= Restigouche County, New Brunswick =

County in New Brunswick, Canada

Coordinates: 47°43′33.9″N 67°5′18.6″W

Restigouche
- County
- Restigouche County
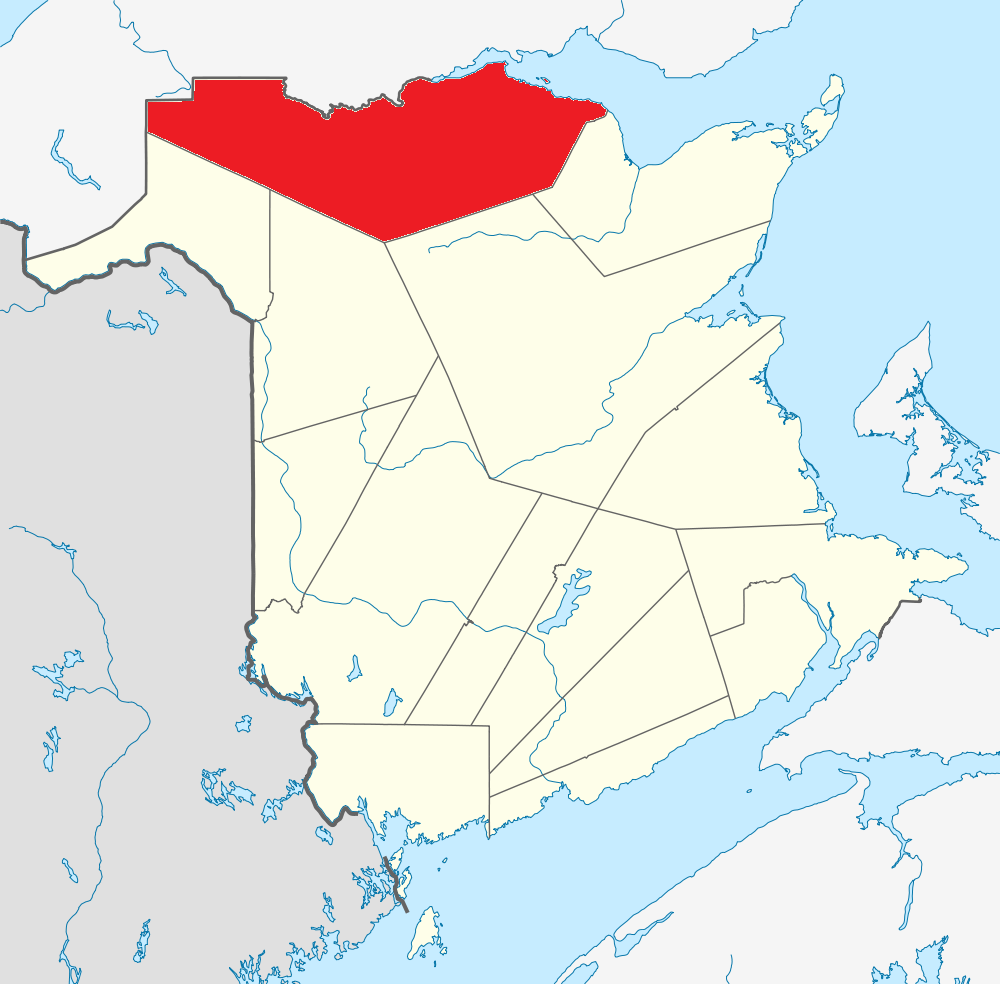
- Location within New Brunswick
- Country: Canada
- Province: New Brunswick
- Established: 1837

Area
  - Land: 8,566.82 km^{2} (3,307.67 sq mi)

Population (2021)
  - Total: 30,700
  - Density: 3.6/km^{2} (9.3/sq mi)
  - Change 2016-2021: ▼0.8%
  - Dwellings: 15,288
- Time zone: UTC-4 (AST)
  - Summer (DST): UTC-3 (ADT)
- Area code: 506

Restigouche County (French pronunciation: [ʁɛstiɡuʃ]; 2021 population 30,700) is located in north-central New Brunswick, Canada. The county is named for the Restigouche River which flows through the county and is famous for its salmon pools, which have attracted wealthy American and Canadian tourists to the region's summer colonies for decades. Forestry dominates the local economy.

== Census subdivisions ==
=== Communities ===
There are nine municipalities within Restigouche County (listed by 2016 population):

Official name	Designation	Area km^{2}	Pop 2016	Parish
Campbellton	City	18.58	6,883	Addington
Atholville	Village	119.60	3,570	Addington
Dalhousie	Town	15.22	3,126	Dalhousie
Saint-Quentin	Town	4.24	2,194	Saint-Quentin
Kedgwick	Rural community	658.08	1,979	Grimmer
Eel River Dundee	Village	65.48	1,953	Dalhousie
Balmoral	Village	43.39	1,674	Balmoral
Charlo	Village	31.30	1,310	Colborne
Tide Head	Village	19.43	938	Addington

=== First Nations ===
There are two First Nations reservations in Restigouche County (listed by 2016 population):

Official name	Designation	Area km^{2}	Population	Parish
Eel River 3	Reservation	1.46	329	Dalhousie
Indian Ranch	Reservation	0.58	89	Dalhousie

=== Parishes ===
The county is subdivided into eight parishes. (Listed by 2016 population, excluding municipalities):

Official name	Area km^{2}	Population	Municipalities	Unincorporated communities
Saint-Quentin	2,478.57	1,532	Saint-Quentin (town)	Five Fingers / Rang-Cinq-et-Six / Rang-Dix / Rang-Dix-Huit / Rang-Douze-Nord / Rang-Douze-Sud / Rang-Quatorze / Rang-Seize / Rang-Sept-et-Huit / Saint-Martin-de-Restigouche
Durham	410.89	1,076		Black Point / Doyleville / Gravel Hill / Halfway / Hickey Settlement / Keepover / Lapointe Settlement / Lorne / Nash Creek / Paradise Camp / Sea Side / Winton Crossing
Dalhousie	62.70	1,067	Dalhousie (town); Eel River Dundee (village); Eel River 3 (reserve); Indian Ranch (reserve)	Dalhousie Junction / Lac-des-Lys / Maple Green / McLeods / McNeish / Point La Nim / Upper Dundee
Durham	410.89	1,076		Black Point / Doyleville / Gravel Hill / Halfway / Hickey Settlement / Keepover / Lapointe Settlement / Lorne / Nash Creek / Paradise Camp / Sea Side / Winton Crossing
Eldon	1,681.46	657		Adams Gulch / Dawsonville / Evergreen / Glenwood / Menneval / Mann Mountain Settlement / Mann Siding / Robinsonville / Saint-Jean-Baptiste-de-Restigouche / Upsalquitch / Wyers Brook
Addington	935.17	656	Campbellton (city); Atholville (village); Tide Head (village)	Colebrooke Settlement / Dubé Settlement / Flatlands / Glen Levit / Glencoe / Malauze / McKendrick / Popelogan Depot / Saint-Arthur / Val-d'Amour / Val-Melanson
Balmoral	1,089.41	278	Balmoral (village)	Maltais / Ramsay Sheds / Simpsons Field
Colborne	754.96	227	Charlo (village)	Benjamin River / Blackland / Caribou Depot / New Mills / Upper Crossing
Grimmer	see *note		Kedgwick (rural community)	

- note: Grimmer Parish has been dissolved and amalgamated as part of the Rural Community of Kedgwick, effective July 2012.

== Demographics ==
Historical Census Data - Restigouche County, New Brunswick
Year	Pop.	±%
1991	39,248	—
1996	38,701	−1.4%
2001	36,134	−6.6%
2006	33,834	−6.4%
2011	32,594	−3.7%
2016	30,955	−5.0%
2021	30,700	−0.8%

As a census division in the 2021 Census of Population conducted by Statistics Canada, Restigouche County had a population of 30,700 living in 14,165 of its 15,288 total private dwellings, a change of −0.8% from its 2016 population of 30,955. With a land area of 8,566.82 km^{2} (3,307.67 sq mi), it had a population density of 3.6/km^{2} (9.3/sq mi) in 2021.

Canada census – Restigouche community profile

	2021	2016	2011
Population	30,700 (-0.8% from 2016)	30,955 (-5.0% from 2011)	32,594 (-3.7% from 2006)
Land area	8,566.82 km^{2} (3,307.67 sq mi)	8,580.00 km^{2} (3,312.76 sq mi)	8,579.66 km^{2} (3,312.63 sq mi)
Population density	3.6/km^{2} (9.3/sq mi)	3.6/km^{2} (9.3/sq mi)	3.8/km^{2} (9.8/sq mi)
Median age	53.6 (M: 52.8, F: 54.4)	51.7 (M: 51.2, F: 52.1)	48.7 (M: 48.2, F: 49.2)
Private dwellings	14,165 (total)	15,259 (total)	15,468 (total)
Median household income		$49,553	$43,065

References: 2021 2016 2011

=== Language ===
Canada Census Mother Tongue - Restigouche County, New Brunswick
Census	Total	French			English			French & English			Other		
Year	Responses	Count	Trend	Pop %	Count	Trend	Pop %	Count	Trend	Pop %	Count	Trend	Pop %
2016	30,155	19,415	▼3.6%	64.38%	9,930	▼7.11%	32.93%	555	▼0.89%	1.84%	255	▲6.25%	0.85%
2011	31,640	20,150	▼4.2%	63.68%	10,690	▼4.3%	33.79%	560	▲31.8%	1.77%	240	▼42.2%	0.76%
2006	33,045	21,030	▼5.7%	63.64%	11,175	▼9.2%	33.82%	425	▼21.3%	1.29%	415	▲62.7%	1.25%
2001	35,405	22,300	▼5.2%	62.98%	12,310	▼10.3%	34.77%	540	▼21.2%	1.53%	255	▲21.4%	0.72%
1996	38,145	23,530	n/a	61.68%	13,720	n/a	35.97%	685	n/a	1.80%	210	n/a	0.55%

== Access routes ==
Highways and numbered routes that run through the county, including external routes that start or finish at the county limits:

- Highways
  - Route 11
  - Route 17
- Principal Routes
  - Route 134
  - Route 180
- Secondary Routes:
  - Route 260
  - Route 265
  - Route 275
  - Route 280
  - Route 385
- External Routes:
  - Quebec Route 132

== See also ==
- List of communities in New Brunswick
- Popelogan River
- Upsalquitch River
- Upsalquitch Northwest River
