= Restigouche River =

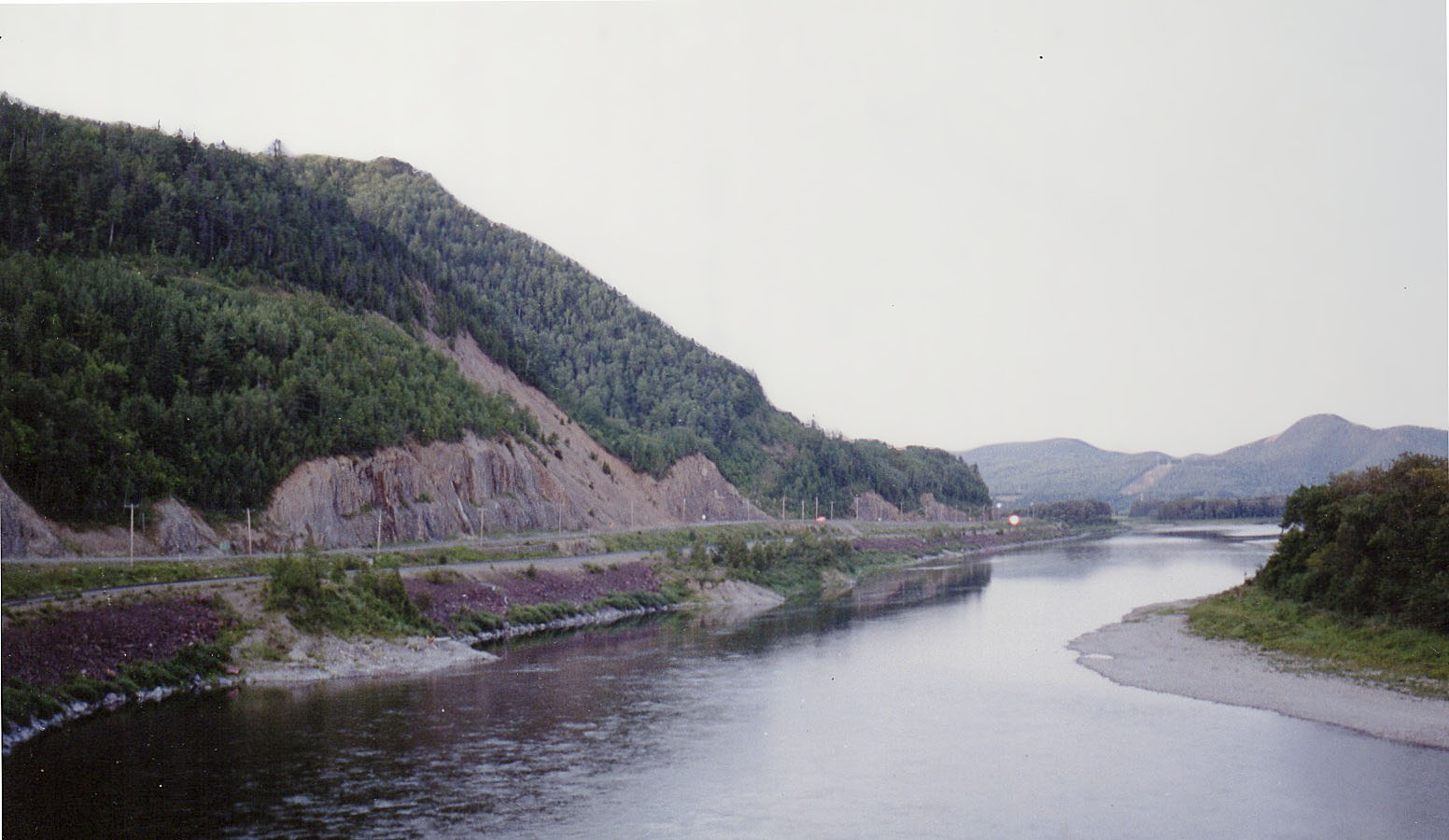
- The Restigouche River at Matapédia

Location
- Country: Canada
- Cities: Matapédia, Quebec, Campbellton, New Brunswick

Physical characteristics
- Source
  - location: Confluence of Little Main Restigouche River and Kedgwick River
  - coordinates: 47°39′52″N 67°29′28″W
  - elevation: 118 m (387 ft)
- Mouth
  - location: Chaleur Bay
  - coordinates: 48°03′46″N 66°19′45″W
  - elevation: 0 m (0 ft)
- Length: 200 km (120 mi)
- Basin size: 12,820 km^{2} (4,950 sq mi)

Basin features
- Tributaries
  - left: In Québec: Escuminac River, ruisseau Harrison, rivière du Loup (Restigouche), Kempt River, ruisseau Fraser, ruisseau Flatland, Matapédia, ruisseau Brandy, ruisseau Chaine de Rocher, ruisseau Chamberland, ruisseau du Pin Rouge, ruisseau Fergunson, Patapédia; in New-Brunswick: ruisseau Tracy Brook, Kedgwick River, Gounamitz River.
  - right: In New-Brunswick: Walker Brook, Black Brook, Upsalquitch River, Wyers Brook, Cheuters Brook, Lower Grindstone Brook, Lower Two Brooks, Upper Two Brooks, Upper Thorn Point Brook, White Brook, Stillwater Brook, Hailes Brook, Five Finger Brook, Lower Four Mile Brook, Jardine Brook, Boston Brook, Little Main Restigouche River.

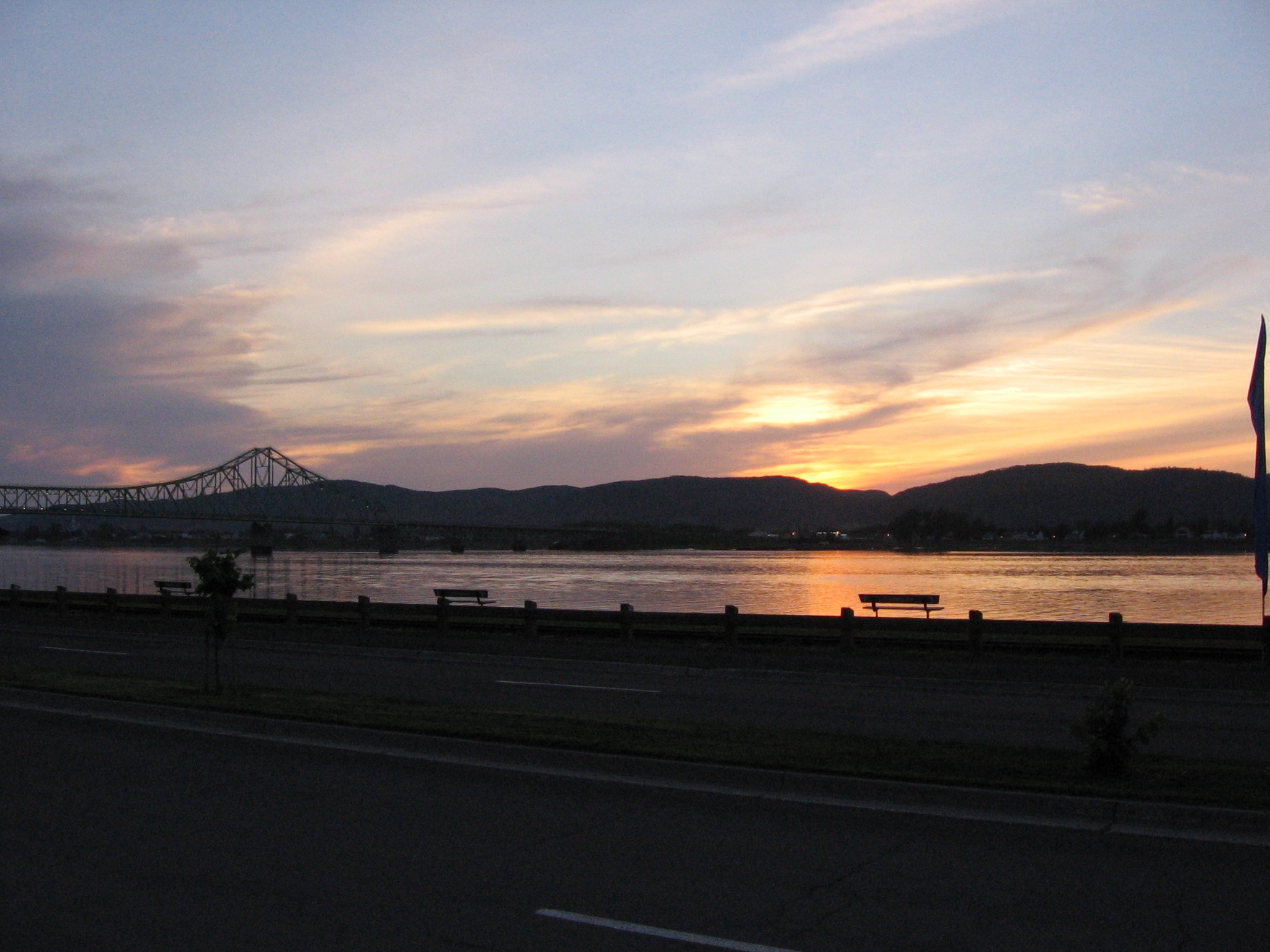
Restigouche River at Campbellton

The Restigouche River (French: Rivière Ristigouche, pronounced [ʁivjɛʁ ʁistiɡuʃ]) is a river that flows across the northwestern part of the province of New Brunswick and the southeastern part of Quebec.

The river flows in a northeasterly direction from its source in the Appalachian Mountains of northwestern New Brunswick to Chaleur Bay. Its meander length is approximately 200 kilometres (120 mi). The Restigouche is fed by several tributaries flowing south from Quebec's Notre Dame Mountains on the western edge of the Gaspé Peninsula (Kedgwick River, Gounamitz River, Patapédia River, and Matapedia River) as well as the Upsalquitch River flowing north from New Brunswick's Chaleur Uplands.

Located mostly in New Brunswick, the river forms the inter-provincial boundary between the two provinces from its confluence with the Patapédia River to its mouth at Dalhousie, New Brunswick and Miguasha, Quebec where it discharges into Chaleur Bay.

The estuary is 25 kilometres (16 mi) in length, extending from the river's discharge point at Dalhousie in the east to Tide Head, New Brunswick in the west and is an important stopover for sea ducks, especially black scoters and surf scoters, during migration. This estuary has been designated an Important Bird Area by the Canadian Wildlife Service.

The Royal Canadian Navy has named two warships after this river: HMCS Restigouche (H00) and HMCS Restigouche (DDE 257).

The source of Restigouche River is located at the confluence of the Little Main Restigouche River and Kedgwick River. This confluence is located:

- 11.2 kilometres (7.0 mi) West of the village center of Kedgwick, New Brunswick;
- 20.7 kilometres (12.9 mi) South of the confluence of the Patapédia River, which is located at the border between Quebec and New Brunswick;
- 74.4 kilometres (46.2 mi) Southwest of Campbellton, New Brunswick, crossing the Restigouche River.

From the confluence of the Little Main Restigouche River and Kedgwick River (in New Brunswick), the Restigouche river flows on 140.5 kilometres (87.3 mi) up to the confluence, distributed according to the following segments:

Higher Courses of the Restigouche River (upstream of the Kedgwick River)(segment of 31.4 kilometres (19.5 mi))

- 4.8 kilometres (3.0 mi) to the Northeast, forming a curve to the Northwest, to the Soldiers Creek (from the east);
- 8.1 kilometres (5.0 mi) North, in a curve to the East, until UpperDowns Gulch (from the southwest);
- 3.6 kilometres (2.2 mi) to the Northeast, to Tracy Brook (from the West);
- 2.6 kilometres (1.6 mi) to the Southeast until Haffords Brook (from the South);
- 1.5 kilometres (0.93 mi) Eastward, forming a curve oriented toward the southeast until Stillwater Brook (from the east);
- 10.8 kilometres (6.7 mi) North, to the confluence of the Patapedia River (from the West) which forms the boundary between the Quebec and New Brunswick.

Middle course of the river (upstream of the Patapédia River) (segment of 50.0 kilometres (31.1 mi))

From the confluence of the Patapédia River, the Restigouche river flows:

- 4.5 kilometres (2.8 mi) to the northeast, to the stream of Wild Chalet (from the north or from the Quebec);
- 2.0 kilometres (1.2 mi) eastward, forming a detour to the north, up to the limit of Eldon Parish, New Brunswick;
- 5.8 kilometres (3.6 mi) to the northeast, forming a wide curve towards the north, to Marshall Brook (from the Northwest or the Quebec);
- 3.0 kilometres (1.9 mi) to the east, then north, until Fergunson stream (from the north or from the Quebec);
- 5.2 kilometres (3.2 mi) to the Southeast, to Ruisseau du Pin Rouge (from the north or from the Quebec);
- 5.9 kilometres (3.7 mi) to the southeast, to the limit of township of Matapedia (Quebec);
- 1.3 kilometres (0.81 mi) eastward until Cheuters Brook (from the southeast, either (New Brunswick);
- 8.3 kilometres (5.2 mi) to the northeast, into Stream Rocks String (from the north or from the Quebec);
- 3.8 kilometres (2.4 mi) to the Northeast, to Brandy Creek (from the north or from the Quebec);
- 10.2 kilometres (6.3 mi) to the South-East, to the Upsalquitch River (from the south or from the New Brunswick).

Lower course of the river (segment of 59.1 kilometres (36.7 mi))

From the confluence of the Upsalquitch, the Restigouche river flows:

- 2.1 kilometres (1.3 mi) north, in a curve to the east, until Rafting Ground Brook (from the East or from the New Brunswick);
- 8.0 kilometres (5.0 mi) to the West, then North, to the confluence of the Matapedia River (from the West);
- 1.1 kilometres (0.68 mi) to the Northeast, up to the railway bridge Canadian National Railway;
- 0.6 kilometres (0.37 mi) to the Northeast, up to the highway bridge (route 11) running on Bell Island (New Brunswick);
- 1.1 kilometres (0.68 mi) to Northeast, up to the limit of the Eldon Parish, New Brunswick;
- 2.8 kilometres (1.7 mi) to Northeast, the northern limit of the Addington Parish, New Brunswick (New Brunswick) up to the beginning of Archipelago confluence of the Restigouche river;
- 8.6 kilometres (5.3 mi) Eastward up to the eastern limit of the archipelago (New Brunswick);
- 6.0 kilometres (3.7 mi) Eastward up to the bridge connecting Pointe-à-la-Croix, Quebec to Campbellton (New Brunswick), or the "Road Gaspé Highway";
- 12.2 kilometres (7.6 mi) to Northeast, up to the height of "Pointe a la Garde" (Quebec) and Dalhousie Junction (New Brunswick);
- 16.6 kilometres (10.3 mi) to Northeast, crossing the Escuminac Bay up to the height of Pointe Miguasha (Quebec) and Dalhousie (New Brunswick).

== History ==
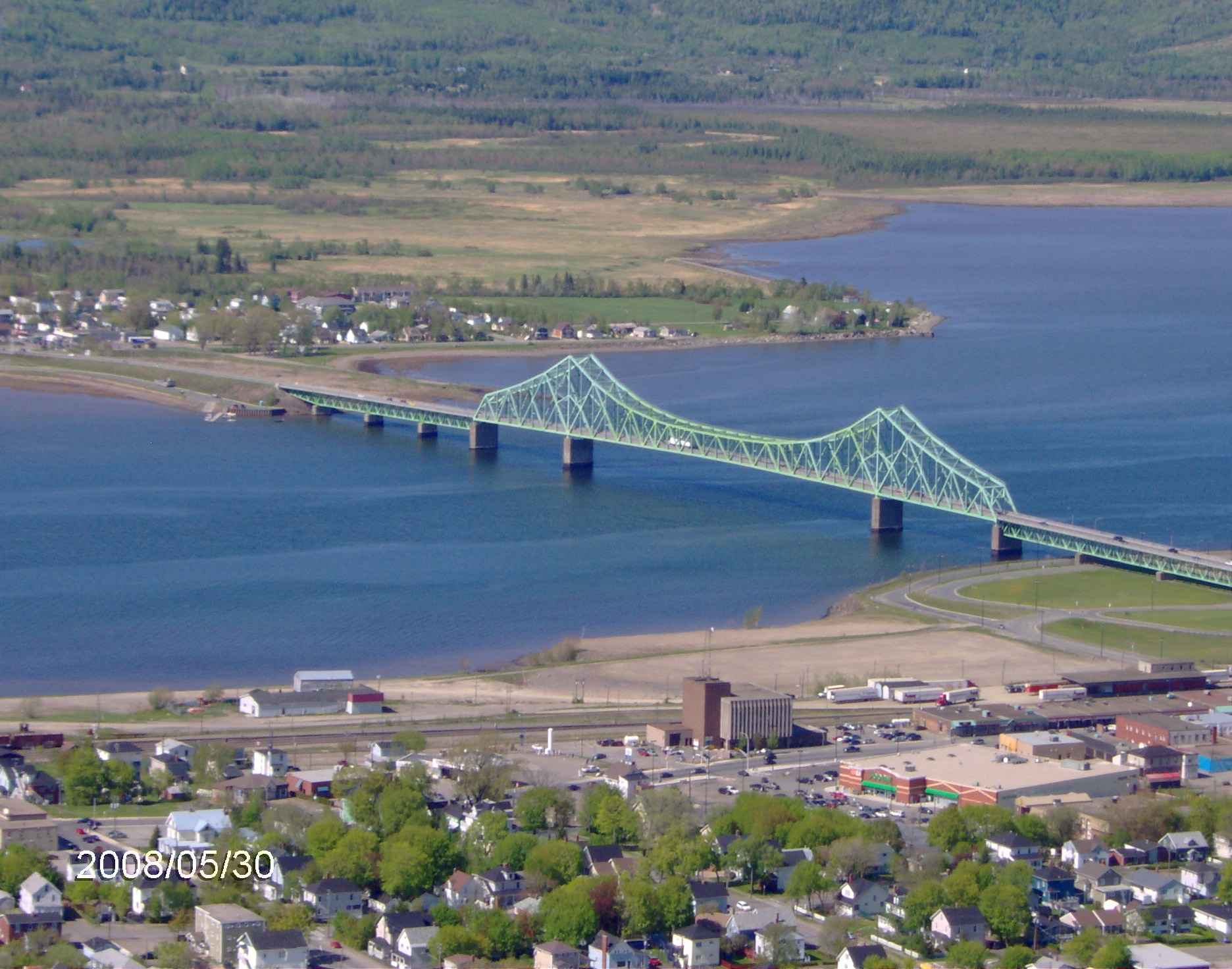
View of the J.C. Van Horne Bridge crossing the Restigouche River between Campbellton, New Brunswick, and Pointe-à-la-Croix, Quebec

The name Restigouche may have been derived from the Mi'gmaq name Listuguj for the First Nations band that lives in the area around the Restigouche River. Lustagooch probably indicates "good river". Both spellings have been used from earliest times: Restigoch (Jesuit Relations, 1642); Ristigouche (Denys, 1672); Restigousche (Des Barres, 1778).

Home to the Mi'gmaq Nation for centuries, the Restigouche watershed is a land of many mountains and unspoiled vistas, as well as significant timber resources. French settlers established several communities on its banks during the 17th and 18th centuries but the area remained largely void of European settlement until the decades following the French and Indian War. The Battle of Restigouche was a naval action between British and French forces which was fought on the river in 1760 during the latter stages of the war. Those French vessels were to supply Quebec with supplies and ammunition following the loss of the battle of the Plains of Abraham, but since the ships never made it, the city never had a chance to be retaken.

The establishment of the colony of New Brunswick for United Empire Loyalists refugees following the American Revolutionary War saw modest influx of several families to the area but the most significant impact came from Scottish settlers following the Highland Clearances. Many Scottish families found work in the infancy of the timber industry and were at the forefront of industrialization of the forests throughout the 19th and early 20th centuries. The Restigouche River and its tributaries became a highway for log drives, bringing timber to the dozens of sawmills at Campbellton, and Dalhousie. Further industrialization saw pulp and paper mills established in those communities by the 1930s to take advantage of the Restigouche watershed's timber resources.

== Salmon fishing ==
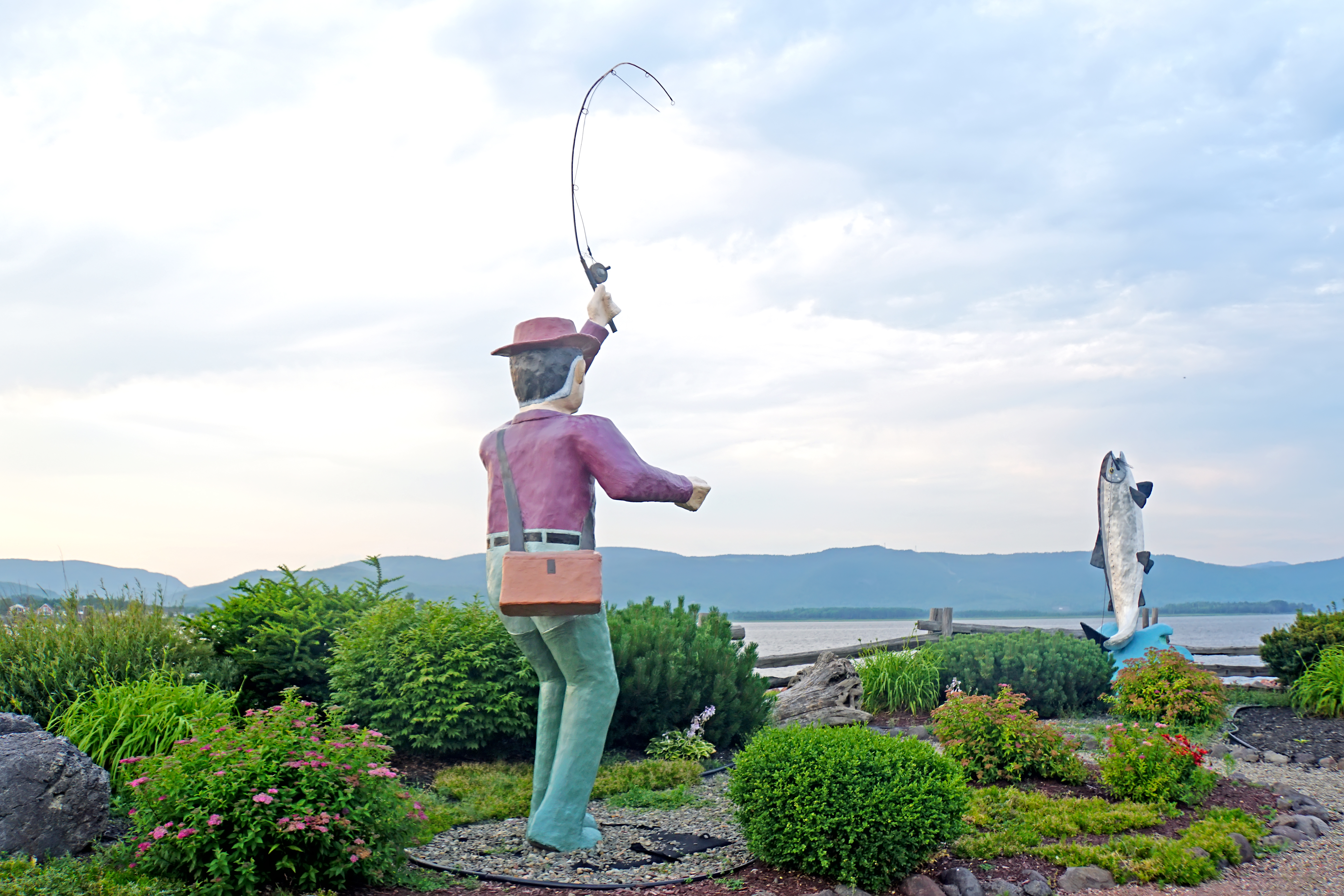
Statue of salmon fishing on the Restigouche River.

The river is a destination for Atlantic salmon fishing. Fly fishing/angling has become a significant source of revenue for many outfitters in the region and a 55-kilometre (34 mi) of the Restigouche has been designated part of the Canadian Heritage Rivers System.

According to Restigouche Lodge between 15,000 and 25,000 salmon enter the Restigouche each year, which attracts anglers from all over the world. While many Atlantic salmon are reluctant to strike, the Restigouche variety are aggressive, and once hooked, they fight hard and are highly acrobatic.

The Restigouche River is known for its exclusivity, clear water and large Atlantic salmon. Fish over 40 pounds (18 kg) pounds are landed somewhere on the Restigouche every year; salmon weights in the high 20-to-30-pound (9.1 to 13.6 kg) range are considered common. Early spring through the end of June is the best time for catching these salmon.

For more than 100 years, wealthy visitors have come to fish for salmon on the river. Guests at the river's fishing lodges have included the Duke of Windsor and Wallis Simpson, Hubert Humphrey, Ted Williams, Lord Beaverbrook, Bing Crosby, Louis St. Laurent, Maurice Richard, Norman Schwarzkopf, George H. W. Bush, and Brian Mulroney.

Part of the draw for salmon fishing on rivers in New Brunswick and Quebec is its exclusivity - the provincial government's Department of Natural Resources auctions fishing leases for physical sections of the river and riverbed to the highest bidder. Many private fishing lodges have been established on the Restigouche which are owned and operated by major corporations and the wealthy. Such leases are time-limited and, for the best fishing pools, can reportedly run into the millions of dollars for fishing rights lasting for only a few years. Leaseholders must obey all provincial conservation laws by hiring their own fish wardens to patrol each leased section of the river and all persons sanctioned by a particular leaseholder to fish in a lease must hold a provincial angling license. The general public are permitted a right of navigation on the river, as per Canada's Navigable Waters Protection Act; however, they are not permitted to drop anchor in, or cause any disturbance to the river bottom, and are not permitted to fish in a particular lease area.

New Brunswick's wealthy Irving family has owned a lodge for many years at a fishing hole on the river – the confluence of the Kedgwick with the Restigouche – and the Government of New Brunswick also maintains a "rustic" lodge in nearby Larry's Gulch which has operated as an exclusive resort/get away for politicians and friends of the government in office. William Kissam Vanderbilt enjoyed fishing on the river so much that he had a private fishing lodge built, hiring the famous New York City architect Stanford White to design and oversee construction of the property called Kedgwick Lodge and fueling the love affair of corporate America with the Restigouche.

The Canadian business elite outside of the Maritimes have not been nearly as enamoured with the river as Americans, although several prominent Toronto families including the Eatons did have a presence. This is largely due to the relative proximity of the river to Boston, New York and Philadelphia, which helped make the region a small summer colony.

The designation of a 55-kilometre (34 mi) stretch of the Upper Restigouche as a Heritage River in 1998 was not the first attempt to preserve this area. Early issues with over-fishing by new arrivals to the area led to the implementation, in 1824, of one of the earliest examples of conservation laws in North America. This culminated in the implementation of the Fisheries Act in 1858 and "opened the door for private hunting and fishing clubs by granting them fishing leases …." The efforts of conservationists continue today with groups such as the Canadian Parks and Wilderness Society. This group claims that only 1 percent of the Restigouche watershed is protected from development.

=== The Ristigouche ===
The Ristigouche and its Salmon Fishing With a Chapter on Angling Literature is a limited-edition book about the Restigouche River, written by Dean Sage and published by David Douglas in Edinburgh in 1888. It is notable for containing a portfolio of 16 etchings and engravings and numerous page decorations, depicting various aspects of the river by notable artists of the day including Stephen Parrish, Henry Sandham, Charles A. Platt, Anna Lea Merritt, Charles Oliver Murray, and George W. Aikman. With its initial print run of just 105 numbered copies The Ristigouche is, according to Bonhams, the "rarest and most beautiful book on salmon fishing". Bonhams sold a copy in 2007 for US$18,000.

== See also ==
- List of rivers of New Brunswick
- List of rivers of Quebec
- Gulf of St. Lawrence
- Escuminac River (Quebec), a watercourse
- Rivière du Loup (Restigouche), a watercourse
- Matapedia River, a watercourse
- Patapédia River, a watercourse
- Upsalquitch River, a watercourse
- Kedgwick River, a watercourse
- Little Main Restigouche River
