= New Brunswick Route 17 =

Highway in New Brunswick

Route 17
- Stewart Highway

Route information
- Maintained by New Brunswick Department of Transportation
- Length: 158.8 km (98.7 mi)
- Existed: 1920s–present

Major junctions
- North end: Route 11 in Glencoe
- Route 180 in Saint-Quentin; Route 2 (TCH) in Saint-Leonard; Route 144 in Saint-Leonard
- South end: Bridge Street at the U.S. border at Saint-Leonard

Location
- Country: Canada
- Province: New Brunswick
- Major cities: Kedgwick, Saint-Quentin, Saint-Leonard

Highway system
- Provincial highways in New Brunswick; Former routes
| ← Route 16 | → Route 95 |

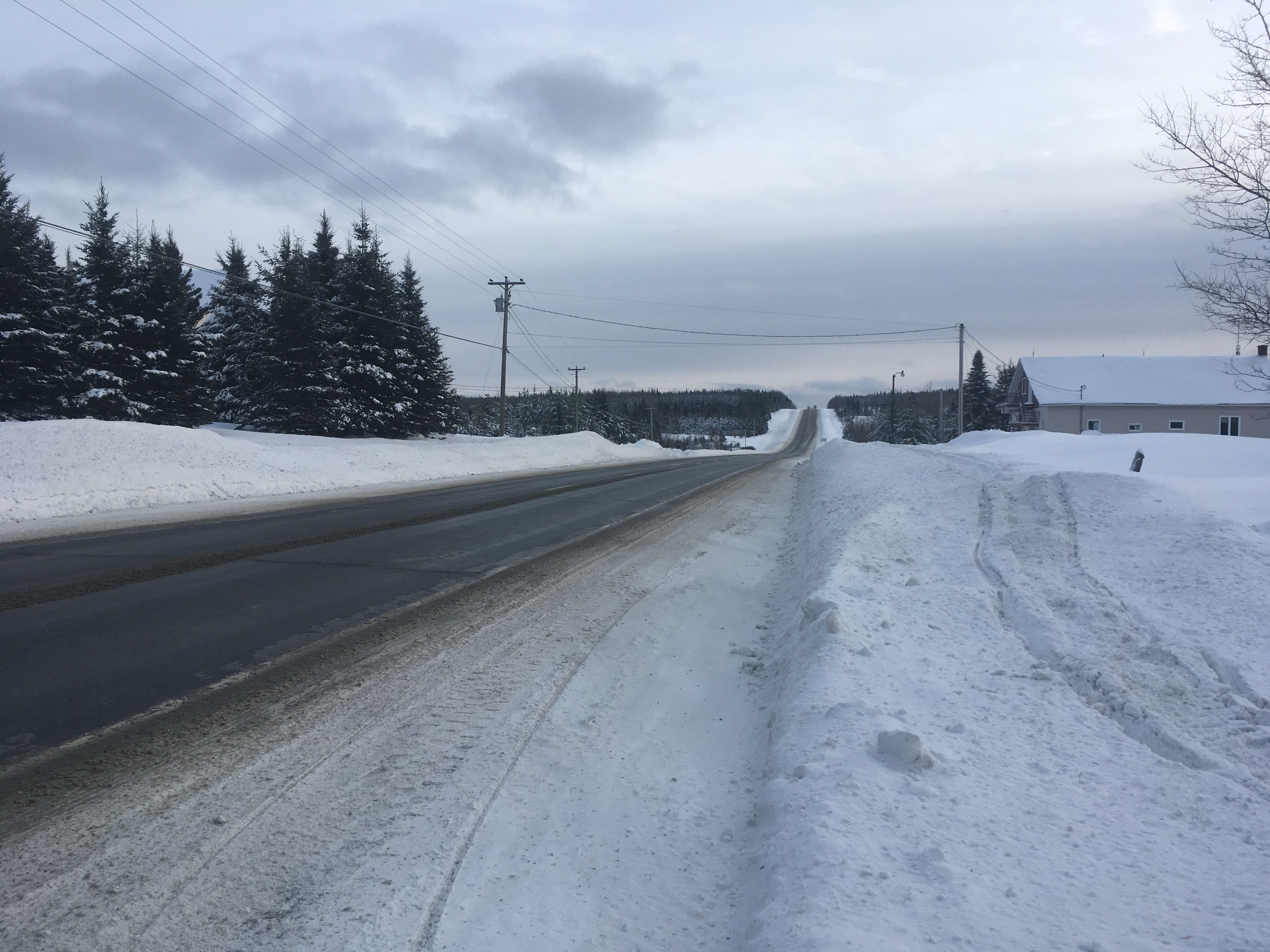
Route 17 in Whites Brook during winter

Route 17, commonly known as the Stewart Highway, is 148 kilometres (92 mi) long and runs from the Canada–US border in Saint-Leonard to Route 11 in Glencoe near Campbellton. Saint-Quentin and Kedgwick are other towns along the route. With the exception of those towns, the highway runs almost entirely through sparsely populated forest land. It is the only highway connecting northwestern New Brunswick with the province's north shore. It is named in honour of David A. Stewart.

== History ==
Over several decades, Route 17 has received several upgrades, and new sections of road built, to improve safety. These upgrades have been designed to meet present-day standards, including flatter grades, creation of more passing lanes, upgrades to guard rail requirements and increased shoulder widths. Some examples of these, have been the new alignments of the highway north of Saint-Leonard, or the bypassing of Dawsonville, west of Campbellton.

== Route description ==
Route 17's northern terminus is at a T intersection with Route 11 in Glencoe (Route 17 is a continuation of the Route 11 direct right of way.) It runs southwesterly from there, passing through the communities of Glen Levit and Evergreen. Between the two communities, is a new section of highway, opened in the early 2000s bypassing Dawsonville, and adhering to modern highway standards.

After roughly 19 kilometres, Route 17 crosses the Upsalquitch River, and passes through Robinsonville, before climbing Upsalquitch Hill. With an 11% grade, it is the steepest arterial highway grade in the province.

Atop of the hill, the road passes through Glenwood. Southwest of Glenwood, the highway descends and then climbs back up Adams Gulch, while passing through the community of the same name. After running west in the wilderness for almost 10 kilometres, Route 17 passes through Menneval, then Saint-Jean-Baptiste, before heading through Kedgwick, where there is a sharp 90 degree turn. Once past Kedgwick, Route 17 turns south, due for the town of Saint-Quentin.

After Saint-Quentin, the highway heads in a southwesterly manner once more and heads through wilderness, with only J.D. Irving's Sawmill in Veneer, in that stretch of woods. Approximately 50 kilometres later, Route 17 hits civilization in Saint-Leonard-Parent, nearing its southern terminus. Roughly 10 kilometres to the southwest, the highway reaches the town of Saint-Leonard. Passing under the Trans-Canada Highway, Route 17 continues to the Canada–United States border, where it reaches it southern terminus.

The speed limit varies throughout the route, from 50 km/h in Kedgwick and Saint-Quentin, to 90 km/h, on many rural and uninhabited stretches.

== Major intersections ==
| County | Location | km | mi | Destinations | Notes |
|---|---|---|---|---|---|
| Canada–United States border | Van Buren - St. Leonard Border Crossing | 0.0 | 0.0 | To US 1 / US 1A – Van Buren, Limestone, Caribou, Madawaska | Continues into Maine |
| Canada–United States border | Van Buren - St. Leonard Border Crossing | 0.0 | 0.0 | Saint Leonard–Van Buren Bridge crosses the Saint John River | |
| Madawaska | Saint-Léonard | 0.6 | 0.37 | Route 144 (Rue Principale) | |
| Madawaska | Saint-Léonard | 1.6 | 0.99 | Route 2 (TCH) – Edmundston, Fredericton | Route 2 exit 58 |
| Madawaska | | 12.2 | 7.6 | Route 255 south – Saint-Andre | |
| Victoria | No major junctions | | | | |
| Restigouche | | 71.7 | 44.6 | Route 260 north | |
| Restigouche | Saint-Quentin | 74.8 | 46.5 | Route 180 east – Mount Carleton Provincial Park | |
| Restigouche | | 89.6 | 55.7 | Route 305 north – Kedgwick River | |
| Restigouche | Kedgwick | 92.3 | 57.4 | Route 260 south | |
| Restigouche | Glencoe | 157.4 | 97.8 | Route 275 east – Saint-Arthur | |
| Restigouche | | 158.8 | 98.7 | Route 11 to Route 134 – Campbellton, Tide Head, Matapédia | Roadway continues as Route 11 south |
1.000 mi = 1.609 km; 1.000 km = 0.621 mi

== Gallery ==
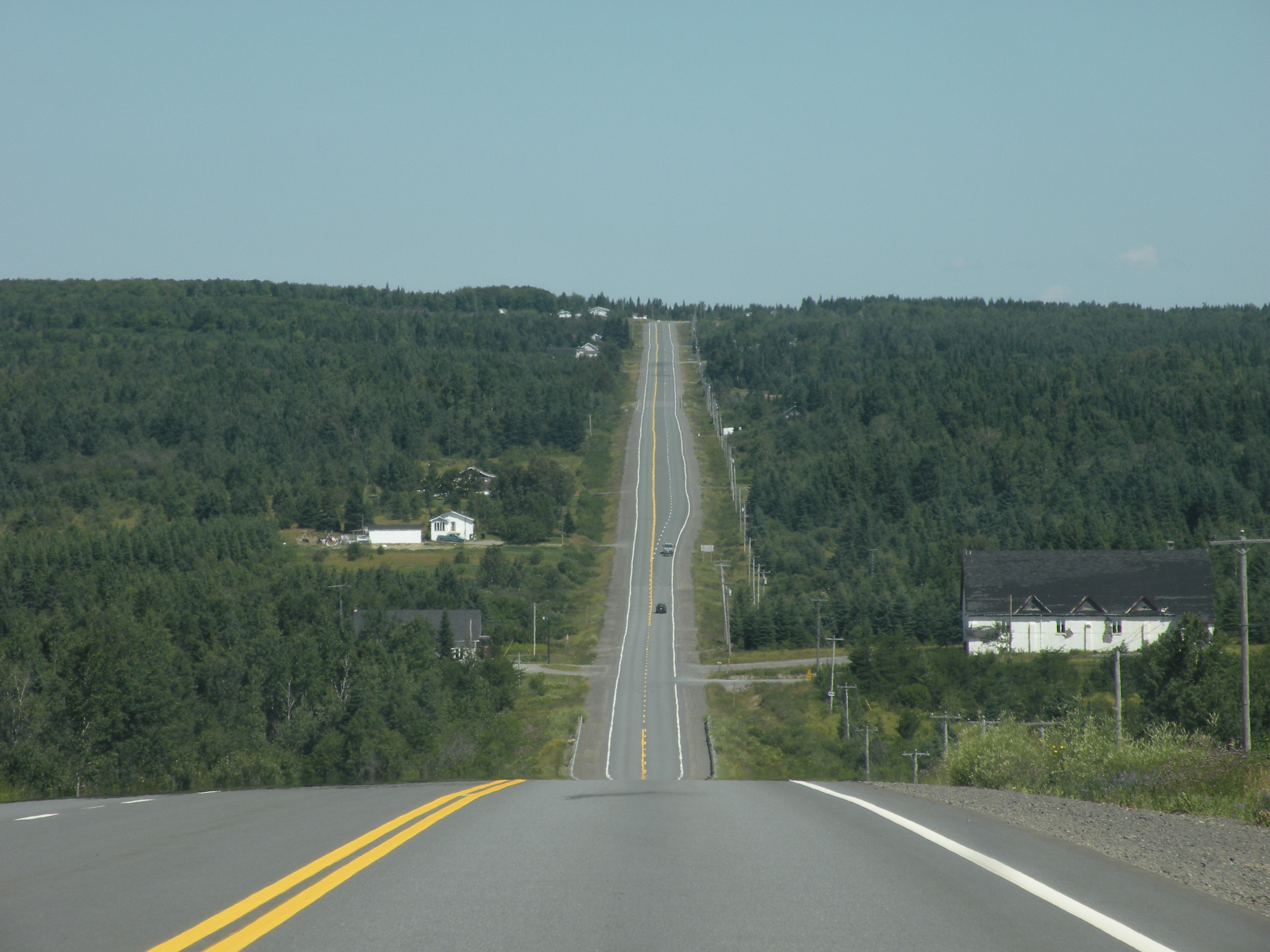
Route 17 in Whites Brook

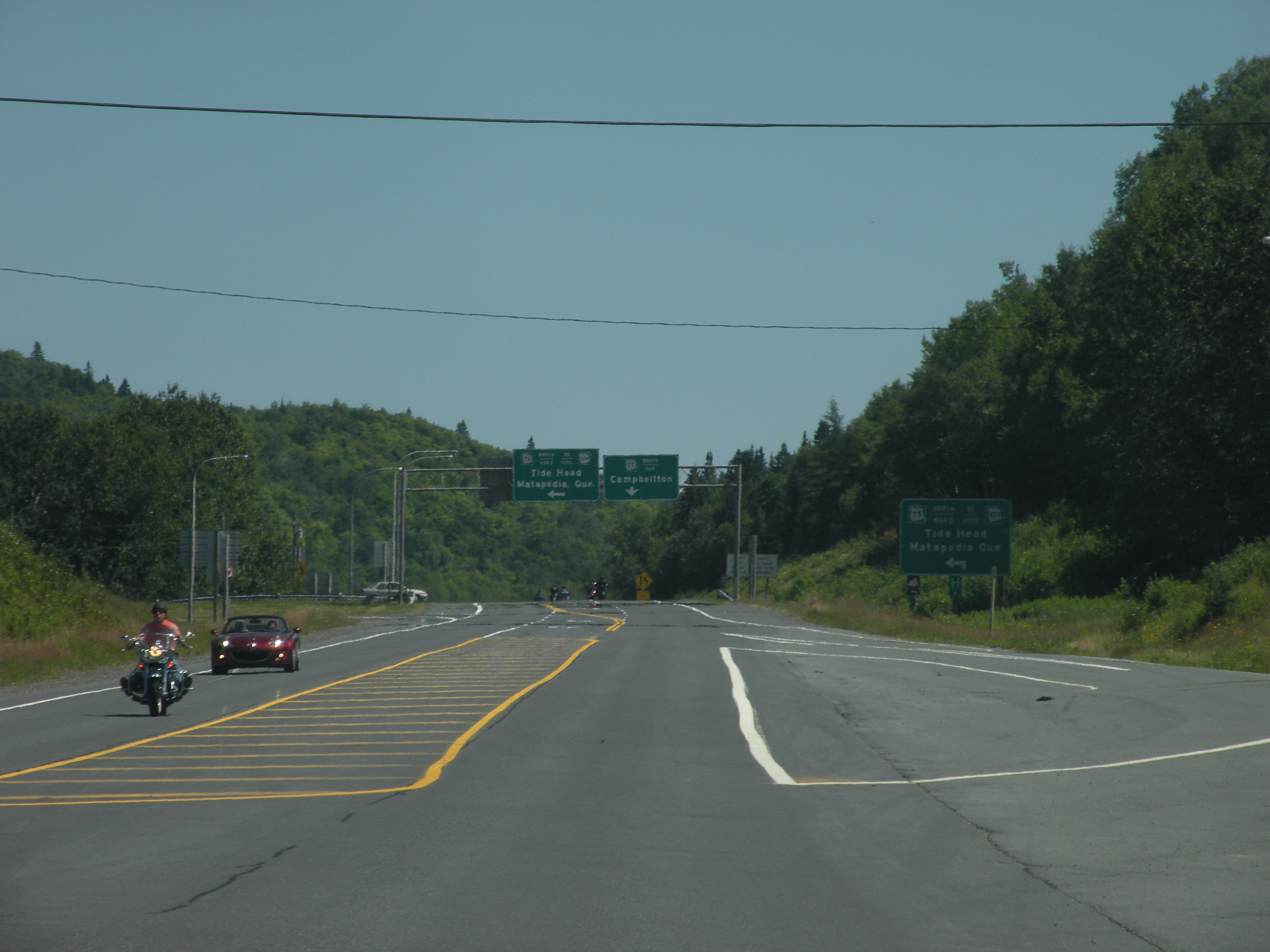
Route 11's junction with route 17 in Tide Head.

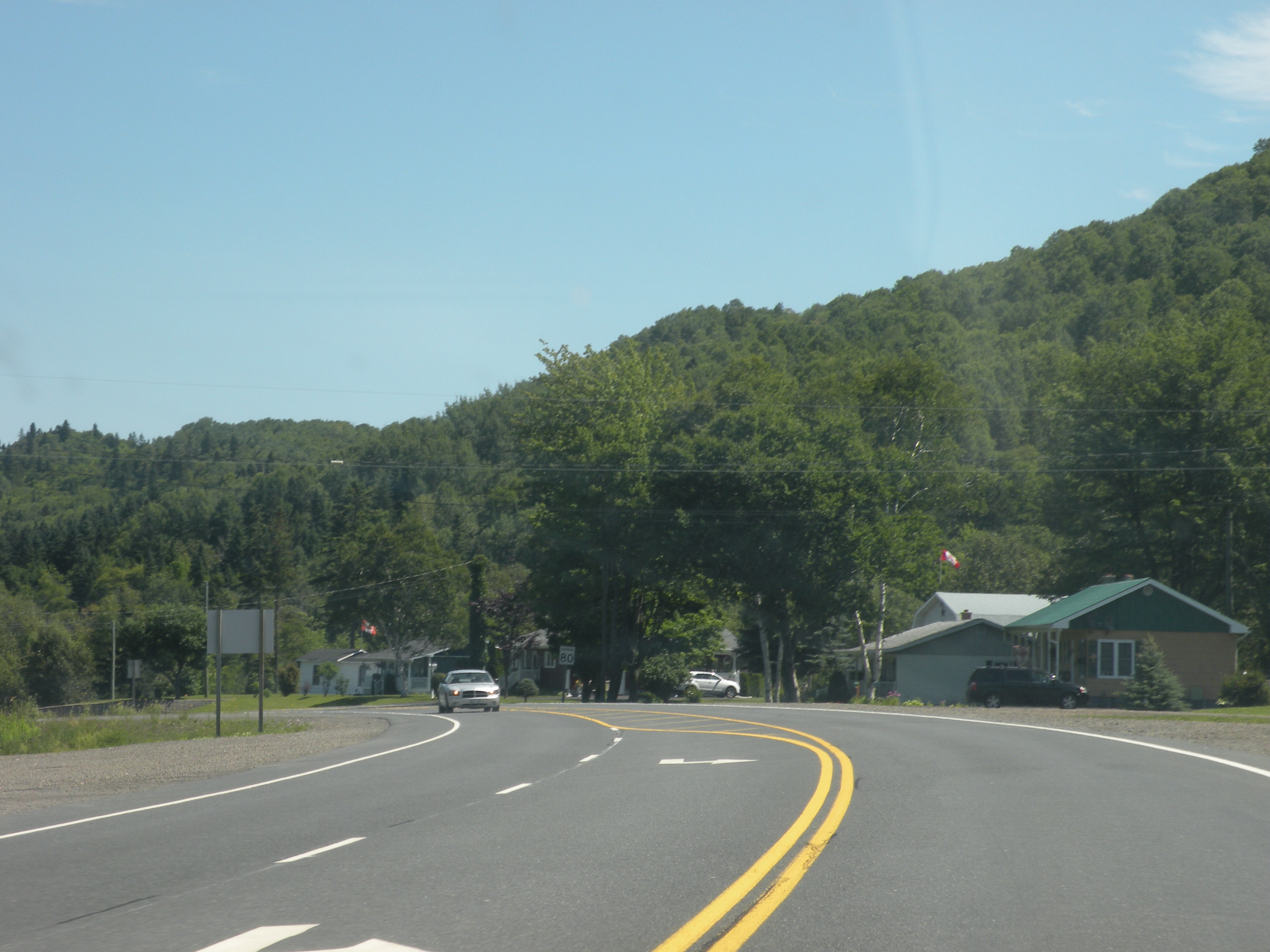
Route 17 in Glencoe

== See also ==
- List of New Brunswick provincial highways
