= List of postal codes of Canada: E =

This is a list of postal codes in Canada where the first letter is E. Postal codes beginning with E are located within the Canadian province of New Brunswick. Only the first three characters are listed, corresponding to the Forward Sortation Area (FSA).

Canada Post provides a free postal code look-up tool on its website, via its mobile apps for such smartphones as the iPhone and BlackBerry, and sells hard-copy directories and CD-ROMs. Many vendors also sell validation tools, which allow customers to properly match addresses and postal codes. Hard-copy directories can also be consulted in all post offices, and some libraries.

== New Brunswick ==
There are currently 112 FSAs in this list. All rural codes in the province have been phased out; as such, no postal codes begin with E0.

E1A
Moncton
East
Dieppe
E2A
Bathurst
E3A
Fredericton
North
E4A
Chipman
E5A
Moores Mills
E6A
Boiestown
E7A
Baker Brook
E8A
Saint-Quentin
E9A
Baie-Sainte-Anne
E1B
Riverview
E2B
Not assigned
E3B
Fredericton
South

New Brunswick Provincial Government

E4B
Minto
E5B
St. Andrews
E6B
Nashwaak
E7B
Saint-Jacques
E8B
Kedgwick
E9B
Miramichi River Valley
E1C
Moncton
Central
E2C
Not assigned
E3C
Fredericton
Southwest
(New Maryland)
E4C
Youngs Cove
E5C
St. George
E6C
Durham Bridge
E7C
Saint-Basile
E8C
Dalhousie
E9C
Doaktown
E1E
Moncton
West
E2E
Rothesay
E3E
Kingsclear
E4E
Sussex
E5E
Campobello Island
E6E
Nackawic-Millville
E7E
Saint-Léonard
E8E
Balmoral
E9E
Red Bank
E1G
Moncton
Northwest
E2G
Quispamsis
E3G
Fredericton
E4G
Smiths Creek
E5G
Grand Manan Island
E6G
Nackawic-Millville
E7G
Tobique Valley
E8G
Belledune
E9G
Neguac
E1H
Moncton
Northern Outskirts
(Lakeville / Shediac Bridge-Shediac River)
E2H
Saint John
Northeast
(Renforth)
E3H
Not assigned
E4H
Alma
Hillsborough
Riverside-Albert
E5H
Pennfield
E6H
Lakeland Ridges
E7H
Perth-Andover
E8H
Not assigned
E9H
Brantville
E1J
Coverdale
E2J
Saint John
East
E3J
Not assigned
E4J
Salisbury
E5J
Lepreau
E6J
McAdam
E7J
Bath
E8J
Petit Rocher
E9J
Not assigned
E1K
Moncton
Dieppe
E2K
Saint John
North
E3K
Not assigned
E4K
Dorchester
E5K
Grand Bay-Westfield
E6K
Harvey
E7K
Centreville
E8K
Beresford
E9K
Not assigned
E1L
Not assigned
E2L
Saint John
Central
E3L
St. Stephen
E4L
Sackville
E5L
Fredericton Junction
E6L
Burtts Corner
E7L
Florenceville
E8L
Allardville
E9L
Not assigned
E1M
Not assigned
E2M
Saint John
West
E3M
Not assigned
E4M
Baie-Verte
E5M
Arcadia
E6M
Not assigned
E7M
Woodstock
E8M
Hautes-Terres
E9M
Not assigned
E1N
Miramichi
East
(Chatham)
E2N
Saint John
Lakewood
E3N
Campbellton
E4N
Cap-Pelé
E5N
Hampton
E6N
Not assigned
E7N
Debec
E8N
Grande-Anse
E9N
Not assigned
E1P
Not assigned
E2P
Saint John
Red Head
E3P
Not assigned
E4P
Shediac
E5P
Apohaqui
E6P
Not assigned
E7P
Hartland
E8P
Inkerman
E9P
Not assigned
E1R
Not assigned
E2R
Saint John
Grandview
E3R
Not assigned
E4R
Cocagne
E5R
Fundy-St. Martins
E6R
Not assigned
E7R
Not assigned
E8R
Hautes-Terres
E9R
Not assigned
E1S
Not assigned
E2S
Saint John
Loch Lomond
E3S
Not assigned
E4S
Bouctouche
E5S
Kingston
E6S
Not assigned
E7S
Not assigned
E8S
Shippagan
E9S
Not assigned
E1T
Not assigned
E2T
Not assigned
E3T
Not assigned
E4T
Bass River
E5T
Valley Waters
E6T
Not assigned
E7T
Not assigned
E8T
Lamèque
E9T
Not assigned
E1V
Miramichi
West
(Newcastle)
E2V
Oromocto
E3V
Edmundston
E4V
Champdoré
E5V
Leonardville
E6V
Not assigned
E7V
Not assigned
E8V
Not assigned
E9V
Not assigned
E1W
Caraquet
E2W
Not assigned
E3W
Not assigned
E4W
Richibucto
E5W
Not assigned
E6W
Not assigned
E7W
Not assigned
E8W
Not assigned
E9W
Not assigned
E1X
Tracadie-Sheila
E2X
Not assigned
E3X
Not assigned
E4X
St-Louis-de-Kent
E5X
Not assigned
E6X
Not assigned
E7X
Not assigned
E8X
Not assigned
E9X
Not assigned
E1Y
Not assigned
E2Y
Not assigned
E3Y
Grand Falls
Northeast
E4Y
Nouvelle-Arcadie
E5Y
Not assigned
E6Y
Not assigned
E7Y
Not assigned
E8Y
Not assigned
E9Y
Not assigned
E1Z
Not assigned
E2Z
Not assigned
E3Z
Grand Falls
Southwest
E4Z
Three Rivers
E5Z
Not assigned
E6Z
Not assigned
E7Z
Not assigned
E8Z
Not assigned
E9Z
Not assigned

== Most populated FSAs ==
1. E1A, 48,434
2. E3B, 39,788
3. E3A, 29,462
4. E1C, 25,834
5. E1G, 24,784

== Least populated FSAs ==
1. E2R, 10
2. E5V, 718
3. E5E, 949
4. E6H, 1,216
5. E6J, 1,234
