= West Branch Gounamitz River =

Location
- Country: Canada

Physical characteristics
- Source
  - location: Saint-Quentin Parish, New Brunswick, Restigouche County, New Brunswick
  - coordinates: 47°42′19″N 68°01′21″W
  - elevation: 547 m (1,795 ft)
- Mouth
  - location: Rivière-Verte Parish, Madawaska County, New Brunswick
  - coordinates: 47°37′23″N 67°54′31″W
  - elevation: 249 m (817 ft)
- Length: 17.8 km (11.1 mi)

The West Branch Gounamitz River is a tributary of the Gounamitz River which in turn is a tributary of the head of the Restigouche River. These bodies of water flow in the Northwestern New Brunswick, in Canada.

The course of "West Branch Gounamitz River" passes successively through:

- Restigouche County: Saint-Quentin Parish;
- Madawaska County: Rivière-Verte.

A forest road runs along the North bank of the lower part of the river.

== Geography ==
The "West Branch Gounamitz River" rises from mountain streams located in forest area, on the Southern flank of the Peak summit (elevation: 636 metres (2,087 ft)). This source is located in the Saint-Quentin Parish, in Restigouche County.

This source is located at:

- 2.9 kilometres (1.8 mi) North-eastern limit of the Saint-Quentin Parish and Rivière-Verte Parish;
- 17.9 kilometres (11.1 mi) Northeast of the Southeast shore of First Lake;
- 12.2 kilometres (7.6 mi) Northwest from the confluence of the "West Branch Gounamitz River";
- 35.6 kilometres (22.1 mi) Northwest from the confluence of the Gounamitz River;
- 25.6 kilometres (15.9 mi) Southeast of the southern boundary of the province of Quebec.

The "West Branch Gounamitz River" is flowing in forest area, more or less in parallel to the West side of the North Branch Gounamitz River.

From its source, "West Branch Gounamitz River" flows on 17.8 kilometres (11.1 mi) distributed as follows:

- 4.0 kilometres (2.5 mi) to the South in the Saint-Quentin Parish (Restigouche County), up to the limit of Rivière-Verte Parish (Madawaska County);
- 9.3 kilometres (5.8 mi) to the Southeast in the Rivière-Verte Parish, up to Caribou Creek (from the West);
- 4.5 kilometres (2.8 mi) to the East, up to the confluence of the "West Branch Gounamitz River"

The "West Branch Gounamitz river" empties on the South bank of the Gounamitz River, in the Rivière-Verte Parish, Madawaska County. This confluence that forms the head of the Gounamitz River, is located at:

- 21.4 kilometres (13.3 mi) Northwest of the confluence of the Gounamitz River;
- 41.6 kilometres (25.8 mi) Northwest of the center of the village of Saint-Quentin Parish;
- 43.1 kilometres (26.8 mi) Northeast of Edmundston downtown;
- 84.4 kilometres (52.4 mi) Southwest of Campbellton, New Brunswick bridge, crossing the Restigouche River.

== See also ==
Media related to Category: Gounamitz (West Branch) River at Wikimedia Commons

- Restigouche County
- List of rivers of New Brunswick
- Gulf of Saint Lawrence
- Restigouche River
- Little Main Restigouche River
- Gounamitz River
- North Branch Gounamitz River
- Rivière-Verte Parish
- Saint-Quentin Parish
