= North Branch Gounamitz River =

Location
- Country: Canada

Physical characteristics
- Source
  - location: Saint-Quentin Parish, New Brunswick, Restigouche County, New Brunswick
  - coordinates: 47°44′32″N 67°58′23″W
  - elevation: 490 m (1,610 ft)
- Mouth
  - location: Rivière-Verte Parish, Madawaska County, New Brunswick
  - coordinates: 47°37′23″N 67°54′31″W
  - elevation: 249 m (817 ft)
- Length: 18.5 km (11.5 mi)

The North Branch Gounamitz River is a tributary of the Gounamitz River which in turn is a tributary of the head of the Restigouche River. These bodies of water flow in the Northwestern New Brunswick, in Canada.

The course of the "North Branch Gounamitz River" passes successively through:

- Restigouche County: Saint-Quentin Parish;
- Madawaska County: Rivière-Verte Parish.

A forest road runs on the East side along the entire length of the river.

== Geography ==
The "North Branch Gounamitz River" rises from mountain streams located in forest area, on the Southern flank of a mountain Peak (elevation: 599 metres (1,965 ft)). This source is located in the Saint-Quentin Parish in Restigouche County.

The mountain source is located at:

- 8.3 kilometres (5.2 mi) Northeastern limit of the Saint-Quentin Parish and Rivière-Verte Parish;
- 22.9 kilometres (14.2 mi) Northeast of the Southeast shore of First Lake;
- 13.7 kilometres (8.5 mi) Northwest of the confluence of the "North Branch Gounamitz River";
- 32.6 kilometres (20.3 mi) Northwest of the confluence of the Gounamitz River;
- 27.0 kilometres (16.8 mi) South of the Southern boundary of the province of Quebec.

The "Branch Northern Gounamitz river" flows in forest area, more or less in parallel to the Southwest side to the Kedgwick River. The lower segment of the "North Branch Gounamitz River" runs more or less in parallel between Létourneau Creek (located on the East side) and Cherry Creek (located on the West side).

From the source, "Branch Northern Gounamitz river" flows on 18.5 kilometres (11.5 mi) as follow:

- 2.8 kilometres (1.7 mi) to the East in the Saint-Quentin Parish (Restigouche County) up to a stream (coming from the West);
- 8.6 kilometres (5.3 mi) Southward, passing a logging camp up to a stream (coming from the West);
- 3.9 kilometres (2.4 mi) to the Southeast, up to the limit of the Rivière-Verte Parish (Madawaska County);
- 3.2 kilometres (2.0 mi) to the Southeast in the Rivière-Verte Parish, up to the confluence of the "North Branch Gounamitz River"

The "North Branch Gounamitz River" pours on the North bank of the Gounamitz River in the Rivière-Verte Parish, Madawaska County. This confluence is located:

- 21.4 kilometres (13.3 mi) Northwest of the confluence of the Gounamitz River;
- 41.6 kilometres (25.8 mi) Northwest of the village of Saint-Quentin Parish;
- 43.1 kilometres (26.8 mi) Northeast of Edmundston downtown;
- 84.4 kilometres (52.4 mi) Southwest of Campbellton, New Brunswick bridge, crossing the Restigouche River.

== See also ==
Media related to Category: Gounamitz (North Branch) River at Wikimedia Commons

- Restigouche County
- List of rivers of New Brunswick
- Gulf of Saint Lawrence
- Restigouche River, a stream
- Little Main Restigouche River
- Gounamitz River
- West Branch Gounamitz River
- Rivière-Verte Parish
- Saint-Quentin Parish
