= Saint-Quentin Parish, New Brunswick =

Saint-Quentin St. Quentin
- Parish
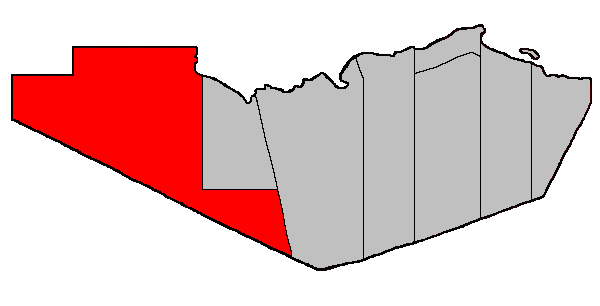
- Location within Restigouche County.
- Coordinates: 47.76°N 67.8425°W
- Country: Canada
- Province: New Brunswick
- County: Restigouche
- Erected: 1921

Area
  - Land: 2,474.01 km^{2} (955.22 sq mi)

Population (2021)
  - Total: 1,504
  - Density: 0.6/km^{2} (1.6/sq mi)
  - Change 2016-2021: ▼1.8%
  - Dwellings: 688
- Time zone: UTC-4 (AST)
  - Summer (DST): UTC-3 (ADT)
- Figures do not include portion within the town of Saint-Quentin

Saint-Quentin (French pronunciation: [sɛ̃ kɑ̃tɛ̃]) is a geographic parish in Restigouche County, New Brunswick, Canada. (Note: The Territorial Division Act divides the province into 152 parishes, the cities of Saint John and Fredericton, and one town of Grand Falls. The Interpretation Act clarifies that parishes include any local government within their borders.)

For governance purposes it is divided between the town of Saint-Quentin, the incorporated rural community of Kedgwick, and the Northwest rural district, both members of the Northwest Rural Service Commission.

Before the 2023 governance reform, the parish was divided between a much smaller town of Saint-Quentin and local service districts of St. Martin de Restigouche and the parish of Saint-Quentin. In the reform, St. Martin de Restigouche was annexed by Saint-Quentin while the parish LSD was divided by the town, rural community, and rural district.

== Origin of name ==
The parish was named for the Battle of St. Quentin, an Allied victory during the First World War.

== History ==
Saint-Quentin was erected in 1921 from Grimmer Parish.

== Boundaries ==
Saint-Quentin Parish is bounded:

- on the north by the Quebec provincial border;
- on the east by a line beginning on the Patapedia River at a point due north (Note: By an astronomic bearing.) of where the southern boundary of Grimmer Parish strikes the Restigouche River slightly upstream of the mouth of Seven Mile Brook, then running due south to Restigouche River, then running easterly along the prolongation of the southern line of a grant to Paul Berube on the eastern side of Route 17, about 3 kilometres north of Chemin 36 No. 1, the Berube grant, and the prolongation easterly to a point about 4.9 kilometres east of Range 9 & 10 Road, then south-southeasterly along a line running from the mouth of Upper Thorn Point Brook on the Restigouche through the former Intercolonial Railway station in Whites Brook and to the Victoria County line;
- on the southwest by the Victoria and Madawaska County lines;
- on the west by Quebec.

== Communities ==
Communities at least partly within the parish. bold indicates an incorporated municipality

- Five Fingers
- Hazen
- Rang-Cinq-et-Six
- Rang-Dix
- Rang-Dix-Huit
- Rang-Douze-Nord
- Rang-Douze-Sud
- Rang-Quatorze
- Rang-Seize
- Rang-Sept-et-Huit
- Rapids Depot
- **Saint-Quentin**
- Saint-Martin-de-Restigouche
  - Limerick

== Bodies of water ==
Bodies of water (Note: Not including brooks, ponds or coves.) at least partly within the parish.

- Little Main Restigouche River
- McDougall Lake Branch
- Northwest Upsalquitch River
- Patapedia River
- Pemouet Branch
- States Lake Branch
- Wild Goose Branch
- Gin Creek
- Clearwater Lake
- County Line Lake
- Eightmile Lake
- Gounamitz Lake
- Miller Lake
- Mud Lake
- States Lake
- Tardif Lake
- Trout Lake
- Wild Goose Lake
- Gounamitz River
  - North Branch Gounamitz River
  - West Branch Gounamitz River
- Green River (French Rivière Verte)
  - Little Forks Branch Green River
  - Right Hand Branch Green River
- Kedgwick River
  - Belle Kedgwick River
  - Fire Trail Branch
  - North Branch Kedgwick River
  - South Branch Kedgwick River

== Other notable places ==
Parks, historic sites, and other noteworthy places at least partly within the parish.

- Bells Brook Protected Natural Area
- Belone Brook Protected Natural Area
- Big Cedar Brook Protected Natural Area
- Connors Brook Protected Natural Area
- Dionne Brook Protected Natural Area
- Eight Mile Brook Protected Natural Area
- Five Mile Brook Protected Natural Area
- Jardine Brook Protected Natural Area
- Kedgwick Wildlife Management Area
- Little Cedar Brook Protected Natural Area
- MacFarlane Brook Protected Natural Area
- Moose Valley Hill Protected Natural Area
- Patapedia River Protected Natural Area
- Pollard Brook Protected Natural Area
- Quigley Brook Protected Natural Area
- South Kedgwick River Protected Natural Area

== Demographics ==
Parish population total does not include the town of Saint-Quentin

=== Population ===
Canada census – Saint-Quentin community profile

	2021	2016	2011
Population	1,504 (-1.8% from 2016)	1,532 (+2.9% from 2011)	1,489 (-5.6% from 2006)
Land area	2,474.01 km^{2} (955.22 sq mi)	2,478.57 km^{2} (956.98 sq mi)	2,478.88 km^{2} (957.10 sq mi)
Population density	0.6/km^{2} (1.6/sq mi)	0.6/km^{2} (1.6/sq mi)	0.6/km^{2} (1.6/sq mi)
Median age	46 (M: 46, F: 46.4)	46.8 (M: 47.5, F: 46.0)	44.7 (M: 44.4, F: 45.0)
Private dwellings	630 (total)	696 (total)	642 (total)
Median household income		$59,776	$.N/A

Notes: Data for this area has been suppressed for data quality or confidentiality reasons.
References: 2021 2016 2011

Historical Census Data - Saint-Quentin Parish, New Brunswick

Year	Pop.	±%
1991	1,543	—
1996	1,554	+0.7%

Year	Pop.	±%
2001	1,557	+0.2%
2006	1,578	+1.3%

Year	Pop.	±%
2011	1,489	−5.6%
2016	1,532	+2.9%

=== Language ===
Canada Census Mother Tongue - Saint-Quentin Parish, New Brunswick
Census	Total	French			English			French & English			Other		
Year	Responses	Count	Trend	Pop %	Count	Trend	Pop %	Count	Trend	Pop %	Count	Trend	Pop %
2016	1,520	1,495		98.4%	15		1.0%	5	Steady	0.3%	5	Steady	0.3%
2011	1,480	1,450	▲1.0%	97.97%	20	▼71.4%	1.35%	5	▲ n/a%	0.34%	5	▼93.8%	0.34%
2006	1,585	1,435	▼6.2%	90.54%	70	▲ n/a%	4.42%	0	▼100.0%	0.00%	80	▲ n/a%	5.05%
2001	1,540	1,530	▲1.0%	99.35%	0	▼100.0%	0.00%	10	▲ n/a%	0.65%	0	0.0%	0.00%
1996	0	1,515	n/a	0.00%	35	n/a	0.00%	0	n/a	0.00%	0	n/a	0.00%

== Access Routes ==
Highways and numbered routes that run through the parish, including external routes that start or finish at the parish limits:

- **Highways**
  - Route 17
- **Principal Routes**
  - Route 180
- Secondary Routes:
  - Route 260
- External Routes:
  - None

== See also ==
- List of parishes in New Brunswick
- Rimouski River
