= Grimmer Parish, New Brunswick =

Grimmer
- Former Parish
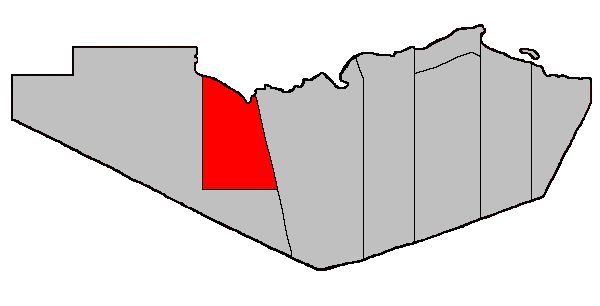
- Location within Restigouche County.
- Coordinates: 47.67°N 67.45°W
- Country: Canada
- Province: New Brunswick
- County: Restigouche
- Erected: 1916

Area
  - Land: 653.48 km^{2} (252.31 sq mi)

Population (2016)
  - Total: 981
  - Density: 1.5/km^{2} (3.9/sq mi)
  - Change 2011-2016: ▼10.5%
  - Dwellings: 443
- Time zone: UTC-4 (AST)
  - Summer (DST): UTC-3 (ADT)
- Figures do not include portion within village of Kedgwick; No census data available after 2016

Grimmer is a geographic parish in Restigouche County, New Brunswick, Canada. (Note: The Territorial Division Act divides the province into 152 parishes, the cities of Saint John and Fredericton, and one town of Grand Falls. The Interpretation Act clarifies that parishes include any local government within their borders.)

For governance purposes it is part of the incorporated rural community of Kedgwick, which is a member of the Restigouche Regional Service Commission.

Before the 2023 governance reform, the local service district (LSD) of White's Brook straddled the eastern boundary of the parish along Route 17. Most of the parish formed the LSD of the parish of Grimmer until its merger with the village of Kedgwick on 1 July 2012 to form the rural community.

== Origin of name ==
The parish was named in honour of W.C.H. Grimmer, former Surveyor General and Attorney General of New Brunswick.

== History ==
Grimmer was erected in 1916 from Eldon Parish. Grimmer included Saint-Quentin Parish.

In 1921 Saint-Quentin was erected as its own parish.

== Boundaries ==
Grimmer Parish is bounded:

- on the north by the Quebec provincial border, running through the Patapedia and Restigouche Rivers;
- on the east by a line beginning at the mouth of Upper Thorn Point Brook and running south-southeasterly through the former Intercolonial Railway station at Whites Brook;
- on the south by a line running along the southern line of a grant to Paul Berube on the eastern side of Route 17, about 3 kilometres north of Chemin 36 No. 1 and its prolongations east to the Eldon Parish line and west to the Restigouche River;
- on the west by a line running due north (Note: By an astronomical bearing.) to the provincial border.

== Communities ==
Communities at least partly within the parish. All communities except Whites Brook are part of the incorporated rural community of Kedgwick. italics indicate a name no longer in official use

- Kedgwick
- Kedgwick River
- Michaud
- Petit-Ouest
- Petite-Réserve
- Quatre-Milles
- Rang-Double-Nord
- Rang-Double-Sud
- Rang-Sept
- Red Bank
- Six-Milles
- Thibault
- Tracy Depot
- Whites Brook

== Bodies of water ==
Bodies of water (Note: Not including brooks, ponds or coves.) at least partly within the parish.

- Little Main Restigouche River
- Patapedia River
- Restigouche River
- Lac à Morin

== Islands ==
Islands at least partly within the parish.

- Downs Gulch Islands
- Half Mile Island
- Little Cross Point Islands
- Tracy Island
- Whites Brook Islands

== Other notable places ==
Parks, historic sites, and other noteworthy places at least partly within the parish.

- Blueberry Brook Protected Natural Area
- Downs Gulch Aerodrome
- Downs Gulch Protected Natural Area
- Kedgwick Wildlife Management Area
- Stillwater Brook Protected Natural Area
- Upper Thorn Point Brook Protected Natural Area

== Demographics ==
=== Population ===
Canada census – Grimmer Parish, New Brunswick community profile

	2011
Population	1,096 (-0.8% from 2006)
Land area	653.48 km^{2} (252.31 sq mi)
Population density	1.7/km^{2} (4.4/sq mi)
Median age	41.8 (M: 42.5, F: 41.3)
Private dwellings	469 (total)
Median household income	$.N/A

Notes: 2011 income data for this area has been suppressed for data quality or confidentiality reasons.
References: 2011

Historical Census Data - Grimmer Parish, New Brunswick

Year	Pop.	±%
1991	1,149	—
1996	1,138	−1.0%

Year	Pop.	±%
2001	1,163	+2.2%
2006	1,105	−5.0%

Year	Pop.	±%
2011	1,096	−0.8%

=== Language ===
Canada Census Mother Tongue - Grimmer Parish, New Brunswick
Census	Total	French			English			French & English			Other		
Year	Responses	Count	Trend	Pop %	Count	Trend	Pop %	Count	Trend	Pop %	Count	Trend	Pop %
2011	1,090	1,060	▼1.8%	97.25%	25	▲66.7%	2.29%	0	0.0%	0.00%	5	▲ n/a%	0.46%
2006	1,095	1,080	▼3.6%	98.63%	15	▼40.0%	1.37%	0	▼100.0%	0.00%	0	0.0%	0.00%
2001	1,165	1,120	▲5.2%	96.14%	25	0.0%	2.14%	20	▲100.0%	1.72%	0	0.0%	0.00%
1996	1,100	1,065	n/a	96.82%	25	n/a	2.27%	10	n/a	0.91%	0	n/a	0.00%

== Access Routes ==
Highways and numbered routes that run through the parish, including external routes that start or finish at the parish limits:

- Highways
  - Route 17
- Principal Routes
  - None
- Secondary Routes:
  - Route 260
  - Route 265
- External Routes:
  - None

== See also ==
- List of parishes in New Brunswick
- Little Main Restigouche River
