= Sainte-Anne Parish =

Sainte-Anne St. Anne, Ste. Anne
- Parish
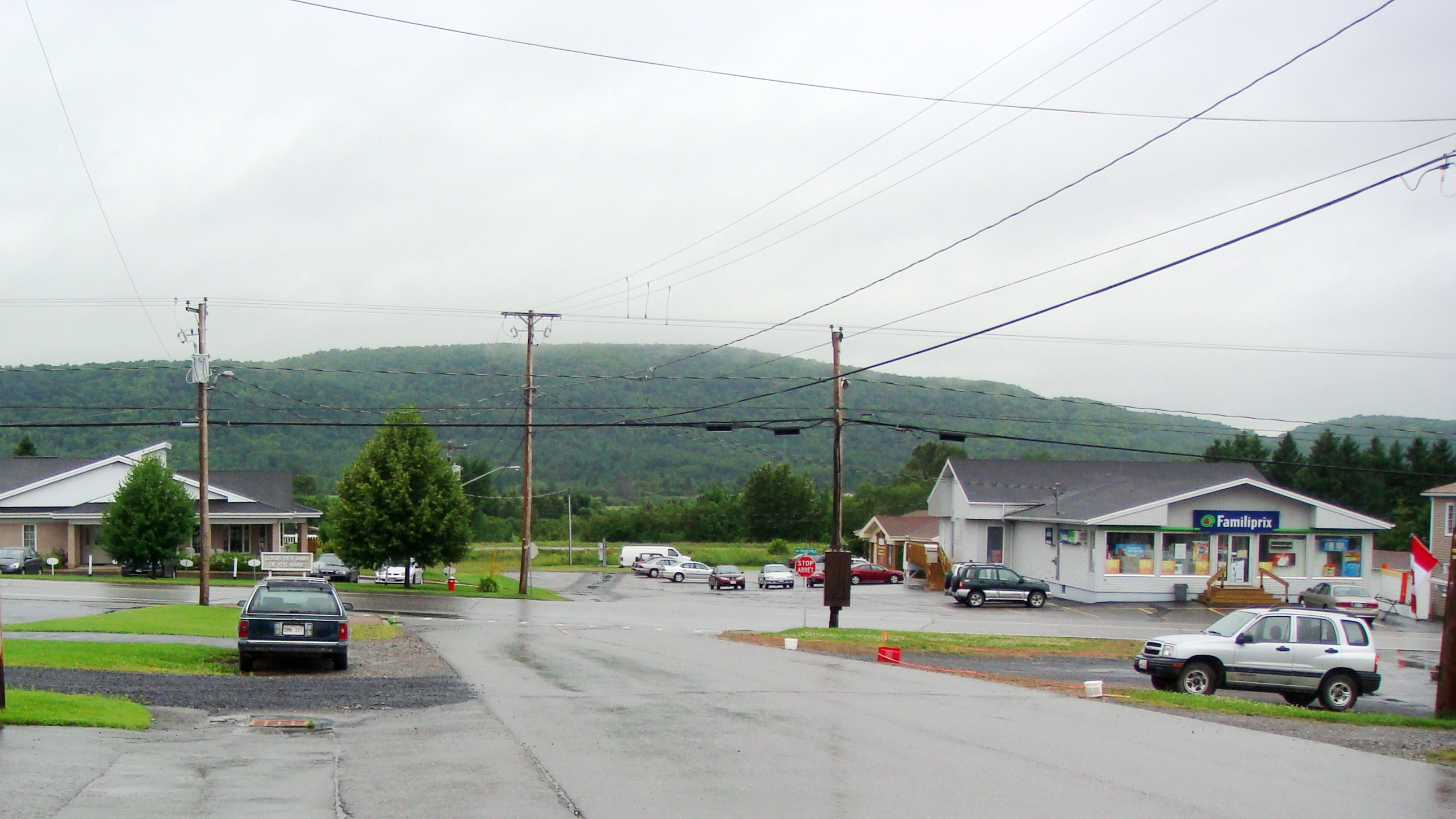
- Sainte-Anne-de-Madawaska village

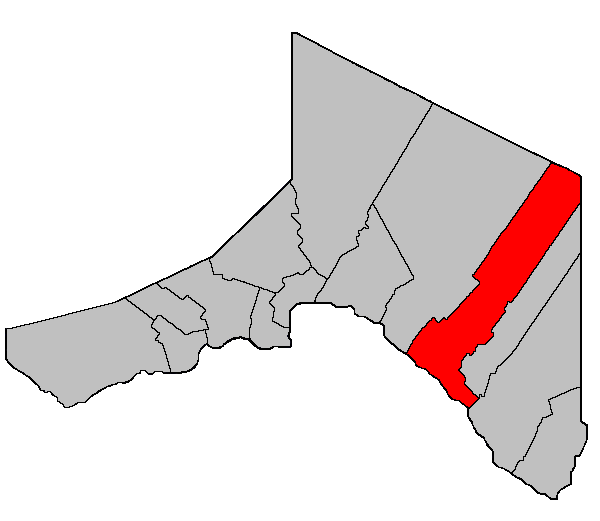
- Location within Madawaska County, New Brunswick.
- Coordinates: 47.41°N 67.85°W
- Country: Canada
- Province: New Brunswick
- County: Madawaska
- Erected: 1877

Area
  - Land: 368.76 km^{2} (142.38 sq mi)

Population (2021)
  - Total: 936
  - Density: 2.5/km^{2} (6.5/sq mi)
  - Change 2016-2021: ▼2.9%
  - Dwellings: 453
- Time zone: UTC-4 (AST)
  - Summer (DST): UTC-3 (ADT)
- Figures do not include portion within the village of Sainte-Anne-de-Madawaska

Sainte-Anne is a geographic parish in Madawaska County, New Brunswick, Canada. (Note: The Territorial Division Act divides the province into 152 parishes, the cities of Saint John and Fredericton, and one town of Grand Falls. The Interpretation Act clarifies that parishes include any local government within their borders.)

For governance purposes it is divided between the town of Vallée-des-Rivières and the Northwest rural district, both of which are members of the Northwest Regional Service Commission.

Before the 2023 governance reform, the parish outside the village of Sainte-Anne-de-Madawaska formed the local service district of the parish of Sainte-Anne, part of which was included in Vallée-des-Rivières by the reforms

== Origin of name ==
The parish takes its name from the church.

== History ==
Sainte-Anne was erected in 1877 as Saint Ann's Parish from Saint-Basile and Saint-Léonard Parishes.

In 1920 Sainte-Anne's boundaries were revised. The same act erected Rivière-Verte Parish from Saint-Léonard, so part of Sainte-Anne may have been included in Rivière-Verte.

In 1922 Notre-Dame-de-Lourdes Parish was erected from part of Sainte-Anne. The name appeared as Saint Ann in the description of Notre-Dame-de-Lourdes.

In 1946 the name was changed to Sainte Anne and the parish was affected by the major reorganisation of Madawaska County parish boundaries.

In 1973 the name was legally changed to Sainte-Anne.

Sainte-Anne-de-Madawaska is known for its historical Catholic Church. Located on Principale Street, the village's place of worship was built in 1923, featuring St. Anne on the top of the establishment. Its location is based in the middle of the village on its highest promontory, reflecting the importance of the Roman Catholic religion in the parish.

The Sainte-Anne-de-Madawaska Church's architectural significance is what gives it local heritage value. It was constructed in the Romanesque style in 1923, which is mostly demonstrated by the beautiful Roman arches on both the outside and interior. The church, which is made of local granite, features a Latin cross layout and has a broad central nave and narrow transepts.

The church is very well known for the array of artworks that are connected to it. Edgar St-Pierre forged two enormous iron crosses that stand 16 feet tall, which stand above each of the two steeples. The main façade's roof was decorated with a large statue of St. Anne in 1947. Mario Mauro (1920–1985), a painter, created the frescoes of St. Anne and Notre-Dame-de-Lourdes in 1960.

== Boundaries ==
Sainte-Anne Parish is bounded:

- on the northeast by the Restigouche County line;
- on the east and southeast, beginning at the meeting point of Restigouche County, Madawaska County, and Victoria County, then running south about 3.7 kilometres along the Madawaska-Victoria line, then southwesterly about 15 kilometres along the prolongation of the southeastern line of four grants on the southeastern side of Martin Road near Miller Line Cache, then northwesterly about 600 metres to Martin Road near its end, then southwesterly about 1.5 kilometres along Martin Road to the northeastern line of a grant to Noël Ruest, then southeasterly to the southeastern line of Ruest, then generally southwesterly along the southeastern line of grants along Miller Road to Ruisseau Noir Road, then southwesterly along the southeastern line of a grant to Hervé Dubé to the northeastern line of a grant to Edmond Dubé, then southeasterly to the easternmost corner of Edmond Dubé, then generally southwesterly the rear line of grants along Martin Road, then generally southwesterly along the rear line of grants along the northwestern side of Ruisseau Noir Road in Notre-Dame-de-Lourdes Parish to the easternmost corner of a grant to Honoré Martin on the northeastern side of Denis Lebel Road, then southwesterly along the rear line of grants at the end of Denis Lebel Road to the rear line of grants on the northeastern side of Jacques Martin Road and its prolongation along a former Crown reserve road, the tier now straddling Route 2, then southeasterly along the rear line of the tier to the easternmost corner of a grant to Noé Cyr, about 900 metres northwest of Notre-Dame-de-Lourdes Road, then southwesterly to the rear line of grants on the Saint John River, at a point about 50 metres northwest of the Route 2 bridge over the Siegas River, then southeasterly along the rear line of the Saint John River tier to the easternmost corner of a grant to Andrew Michaud, about 600 metres northwesterly of Grande Rivière and about 400 metres northeast of Route 2, then southwesterly along the Michaud grant to the international border within the Saint John River;
- on the southwest by the international border within the Saint John River;
- on the northwest, beginning on the international border in the Saint John River on the prolongation of the northwestern line of a grant to Louis Pelletier and L. Moreau, then northeasterly along the prolongation and the Pelletier & Moreau grant, about 1.1 kilometres northwest of Lavoie Road, to its rear line, on the southwestern line of a grant John R. Lynch, on the northeastern side of the prolongation of Moreau Road, then northwesterly about 100 metres to the westernmost corner of the Lynch grant, then about 2.5 kilometres northeasterly, with a slight curve near the middle, along the Lynch grant and a grant to Pierre Ringuet, to the Quisibis River, then about 50 metres downstream, then northeasterly along the northeastern line of Lot G within a five-lot grant to John M. Stevens to the rear line of grants on the southwestern side of Montagne-de-la-Croix Road, then southeasterly about 1.3 kilometres along the rear line of the tier, then northeasterly along the southeastern line of a grant to Théodule Clavette to Montagne-de-la-Croix Road, then southeasterly along the road about 550 metres to the westernmost corner of a grant to Ludger Guerrette, then northeasterly about 8.7 kilometres along the southeastern line of Guerrette and its prolongation to the southwestern line of the Third Tract granted to the New Brunswick Railway Company, then northwesterly about 2.1 kilometres to the westernmost corner of the Third Tract, then northeasterly along the Third Tract to the Restigouche County line.

== Communities ==
Communities at least partly within the parish. bold indicates an incorporated municipality

- Fourche-à-Clark
- Miller Line Cache
- Prime
- Quisibis
- Rang-des-Deschêne
- **Sainte-Anne-de-Madawaska**
- Siegas
- Siegas Lake Settlement
- Sirois

== Bodies of water ==
Bodies of water (Note: Not including brooks, ponds or coves.) at least partly in the parish.

- Gounamitz River
- Little Main Restigouche River
- Quisibis River
- Saint John River
- Siegas River
- Fourche à Clark
- Mud Lake
- Quisibis Lake
- Siegas Lake

== Islands ==
Islands at least partly in the parish.

- Quisibis Island

== Other notable places ==
Parks, historic sites, and other noteworthy places at least partly in the parish.

- Martial Brook Protected Natural Area

== Demographics ==
Parish population total does not include Sainte-Anne-de-Madawaska

=== Population ===
**Population trend**

Census	Population	Change (%)
2016	964	▲1.6%
2011	949	▼12.2%
2006	1,081	▼9.9%
2001	1,200	▼0.5%
1996	1,206	▲3.3%
1991	1,168	N/A

=== Language ===
**Mother tongue (2016)**

Language	Population	Pct (%)
French only	925	96.9%
English only	25	2.6%
Other languages	0	0%
Both English and French	5	0.5%

== See also ==
- List of parishes in New Brunswick
