= Rang-Dix-Huit, New Brunswick =

Rang-Dix-Huit
- Unincorporated community
- Location within New Brunswick.
- Coordinates: 47.52°N 67.32°W
- Country: Canada
- Province: New Brunswick
- County: Restigouche
- Parish: Saint-Quentin
- Electoral Districts Federal: Madawaska—Restigouche
- Provincial: Restigouche-La-Vallée

Government
  - Type: Local service district
- Time zone: UTC-4 (AST)
  - Summer (DST): UTC-3 (ADT)
- Area code: 506
- Highways: Route 180

Rang-Dix-Huit (French pronunciation: [ʁɑ̃ diz‿ɥit]) is an unincorporated community in Restigouche County, New Brunswick, Canada.

== See also ==
- List of communities in New Brunswick
