= Drummond, New Brunswick =

Drummond
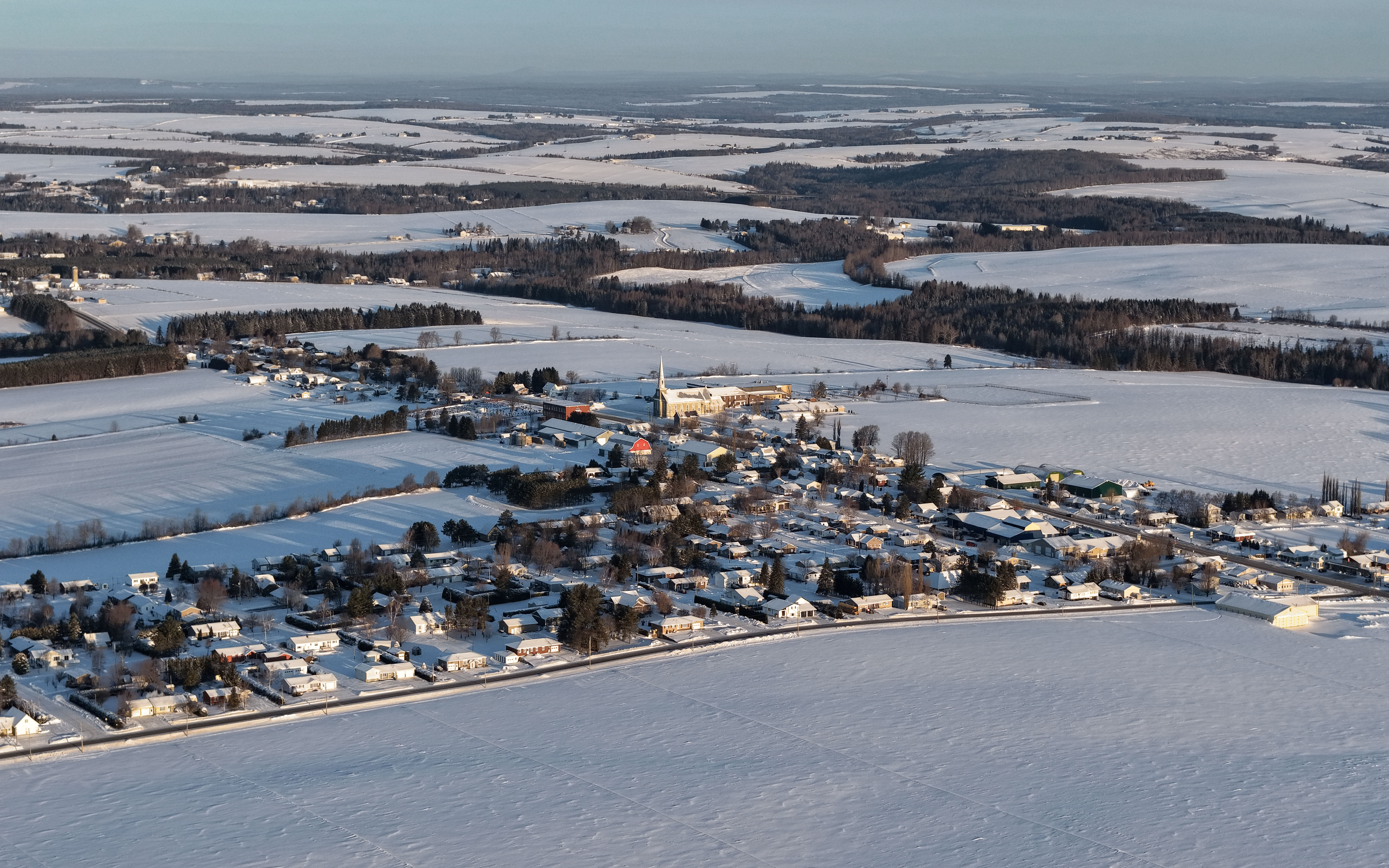

- Location within New Brunswick
- Coordinates: 47.0353°N 67.6852°W
- Country: Canada
- Province: New Brunswick
- County: Victoria
- Parish: Drummond Parish
- Town: Grand Falls

Area
  - Land: 8.88 km^{2} (3.43 sq mi)

Population (2021)
  - Total: 729
  - Density: 82.1/km^{2} (213/sq mi)
  - Change 2016–21: ▼1.1%
- Time zone: UTC-4 (Atlantic)
  - Summer (DST): UTC-3 (Atlantic)
- Area code: Area code 506
- Dwellings: 350
- Website: www.drummondnb.com

Drummond is a former village in northwestern New Brunswick, Canada. It held village status prior to 2023 and is now part of the town of Grand Falls.

It is located in rolling farmland approximately 5 kilometres southeast of Grand Falls, of which it is administratively a part. Drummond's economy is centred on the potato industry, and cereal crops such as wheat, barley and oats are grown mainly through crop rotation. More than 50% of the potatoes grown are sold for processing to McCain Foods Limited, and 45% are grown as seed potatoes for inter-provincial and international export.

== History ==
Drummond NB.JPG

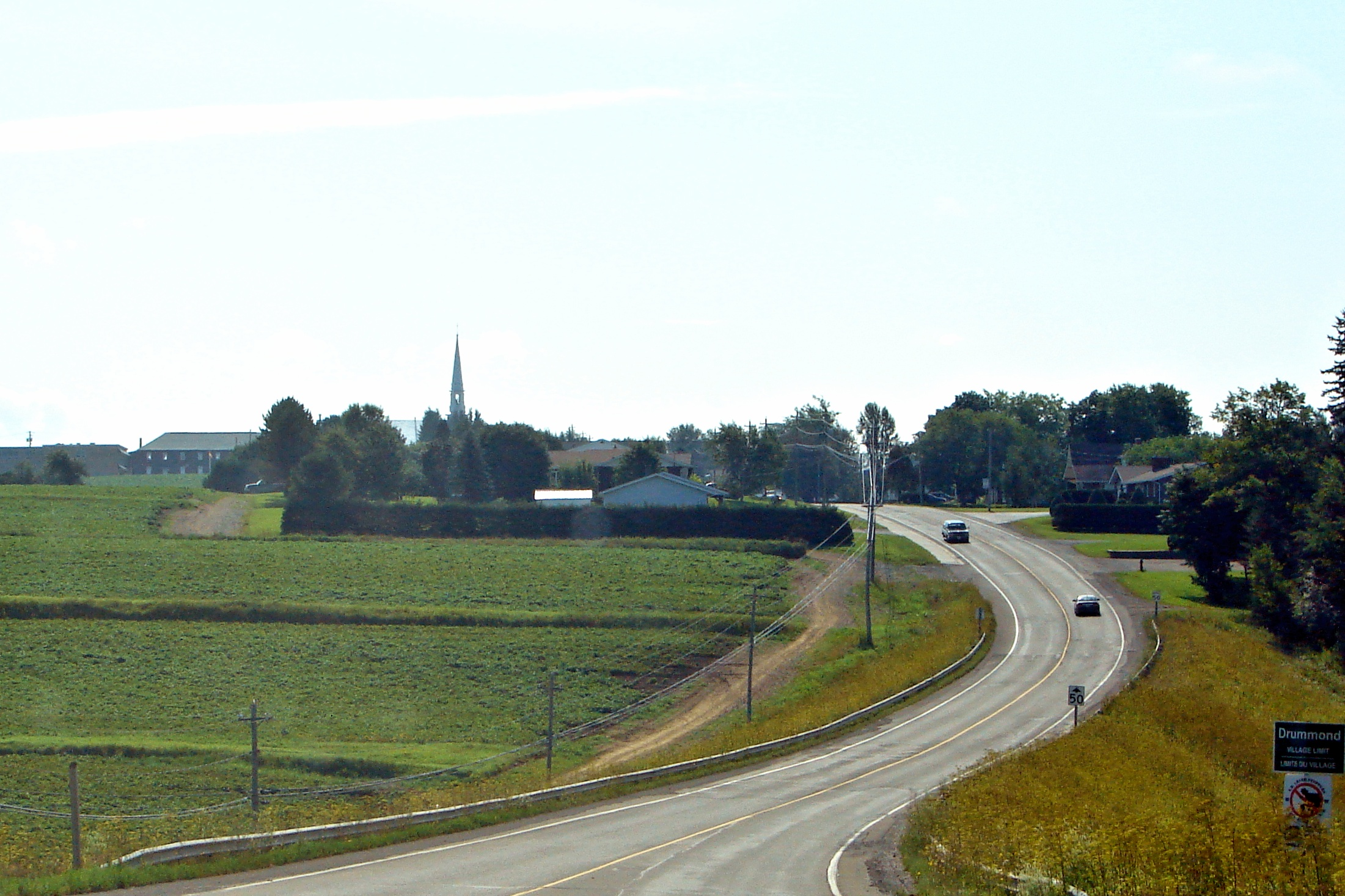
View from outside town

The village was first settled by Irish immigrants in the 1850s. It was named after Gordon Drummond, a major in the British Army. Acadian settlement occurred during the latter half of the 19th century.

On 1 January 2023, Drummond amalgamated with the town of Grand Falls The community's name remains in official use.

== Demographics ==
In the 2021 Census of Population conducted by Statistics Canada, Drummond had a population of 729 living in 335 of its 350 total private dwellings, a change of −1.1% from its 2016 population of 737. With a land area of 8.88 km^{2} (3.43 sq mi), it had a population density of 82.1/km^{2} (212.6/sq mi) in 2021.

Historical Census Data - Drummond, New Brunswick
Year	Pop.	±%
2006	839	—
2011	775	−7.6%
2016	737	−4.9%
2021	729	−1.1%

== Notable people ==
- Ron Turcotte, who won the Triple Crown of Thoroughbred Racing in 1973, was born in Drummond.

== See also ==
- List of communities in New Brunswick
- Drummond Parish, New Brunswick
