= Notre-Dame-de-Lourdes Parish =

Notre-Dame-de-Lourdes
- Parish
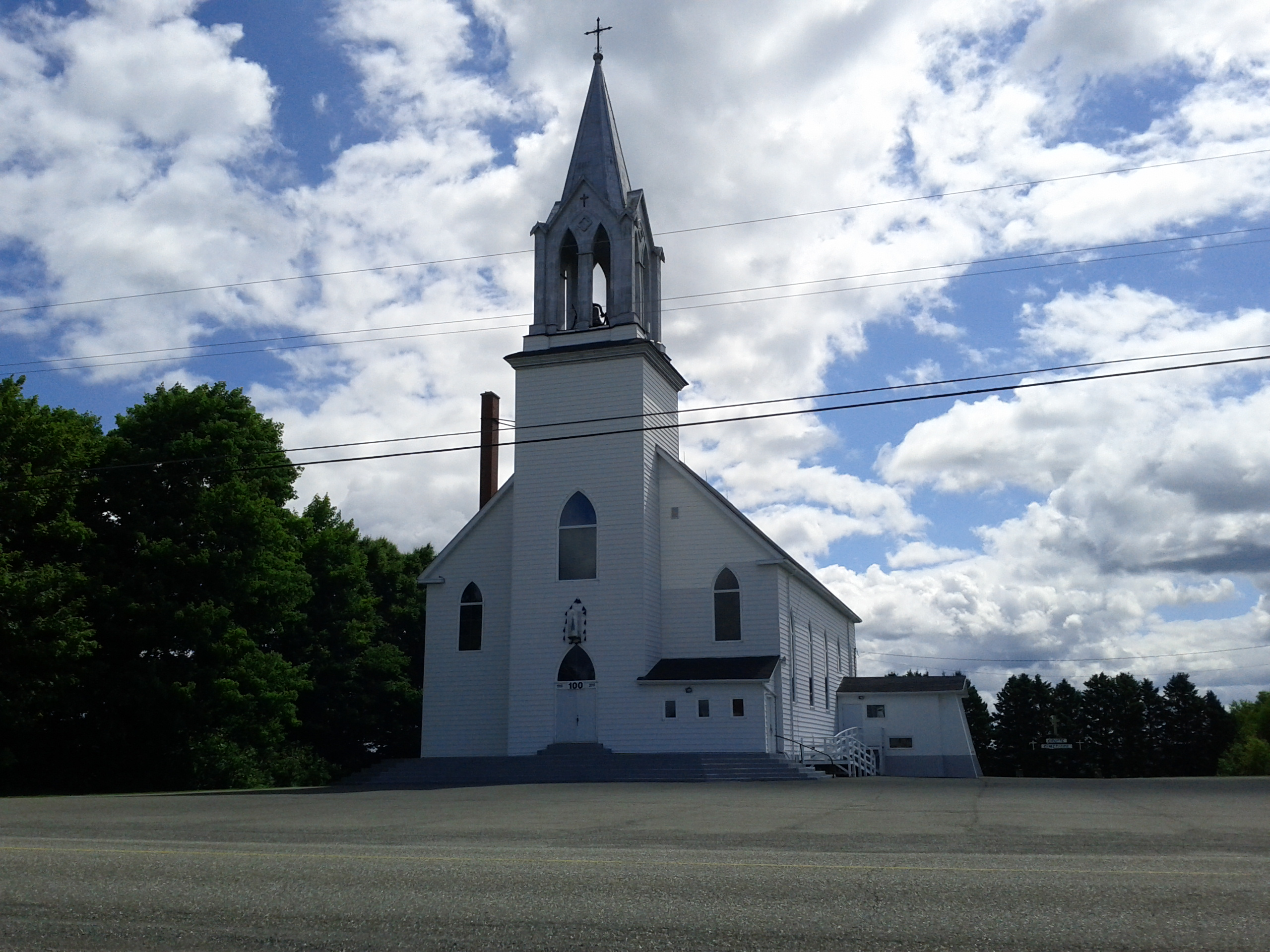

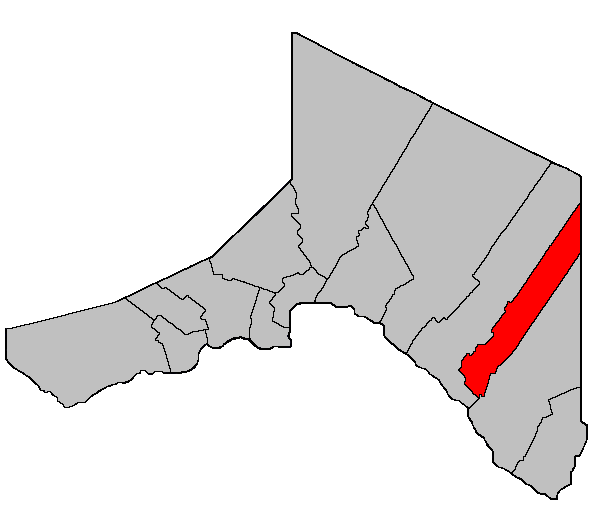
- Location within Madawaska County, New Brunswick.
- Coordinates: 47.25°N 67.9375°W
- Country: Canada
- Province: New Brunswick
- County: Madawaska
- Erected: 1922

Area
  - Land: 186.30 km^{2} (71.93 sq mi)

Population (2021)
  - Total: 253
  - Density: 1.4/km^{2} (3.6/sq mi)
  - Change 2016-2021: ▼8.0%
  - Dwellings: 117
- Time zone: UTC-4 (AST)
  - Summer (DST): UTC-3 (ADT)

Notre-Dame-de-Lourdes is a geographic parish in Madawaska County, New Brunswick, Canada.

For governance purposes, the parish is divided between the town of Vallée-des-Rivières in the southwest and the Northwest rural district in the northeast, both of which are members of the Northwest Regional Service Commission.

Before the 2023 governance reforms, the entire parish formed the local service district of the parish of Notre-Dame-de-Lourdes.

== Origin of name ==
The parish takes its name from the Roman Catholic ecclesiastical parish.

== History ==
Notre-Dame-de-Lourdes was erected in 1922 from Sainte-Anne Parish.

In 1946 Notre-Dame-de-Lourdes was affected by the major reorganisation of Madawaska County parish boundaries.

== Boundaries ==
Notre-Dames-de-Lourdes Parish is bounded:

- on the east by the Victoria County line, beginning at a point about 3.7 kilometres south of the Restigouche County line and running south about 10.2 kilometres to the prolongation of the southeastern line of a grant to Aimé Dubé on the southeastern side of Grande Rivière;
- on the southeast, beginning on the county line, then running southwesterly along the prolongation of Dubé to its easternmost corner, then generally southerly along the rear line of grants fronting on the southeastern side of Grande Rivière to the end of the tier, about 450 metres past Diamond Road;
- on the south, beginning at the southernmost corner of a grant to William Byram at the end of the Grande Rivière tier, then running westerly and northwesterly along the Byram grant to Grande Rivière, then downstream to the southeastern line of a grant to Rosomo Violette, about 600 metres northwesterly of Grande Rivière and about 400 metres northeasterly of Route 2, then southwesterly along the Violette grant to its southernmost corner, which is on the rear line of the grants along the Saint John River, then northwesterly along the Saint John River tier to a point on Route 2 about 50 metres northwest of the bridge across the Siegas River, the westernmost corner of a grant to Joseph P. Cye, then northeasterly along the northwestern line of Joseph P. Cyr to the rear line of Tier Two behind the Saint John River grants, then northwesterly along Tier Two, crossing Siegas River, to the westernmost corner of a grant to Paul Cyr, about 300 metres past the Siegas River;
- on the west and northwest, beginning on the westernmost corner of the Paul Cyr, then running generally northeasterly along the rear line of grants fronting on the northwestern side of Ruisseau Noir Road until it reaches the northeastern line of a grant to James Dubé which straddles Ruisseau Noir near its mouth, then northeasterly along the rear line of Tier Four of the Siegas Lake Settlement, which fronts on the southeastern side of Martin Road, until it reaches the southwestern line of the Dubé Settlement at the southwestern line of a grant to Abel Gauvin, then northwesterly along Dubé Settlement to Martin Road, then northeasterly along the remainder of Martin Road to the northeastern line of Dubé Settlement, then southeasterly along Dubé Settlement to the prolongation of the southeastern line of the last four grants in Tier Four of Siegas Lake, then northeasterly along the prolongation to the county line.

== Communities ==
Communities at least partly within the parish; bold indicates an incorporated municipality

- Flemming
- Harrison Brook Settlement
- Miller Line Cache
- Notre-Dame-de-Lourdes

== Bodies of water ==
Bodies of water (Note: Not including brooks, ponds or coves.) at least partly in the parish:

- Grande Rivière
- Little Main Restigouche River

== Demographics ==
=== Population ===
**Population trend**

Census	Population	Change (%)
2016	275	▲4.6%
2011	263	▼7.4%
2006	284	▼7.2%
2001	306	▼11.3%
1996	345	▼26.9%
1991	472	N/A

=== Language ===
**Mother tongue (2016)**

Language	Population	Pct (%)
French only	245	89.1%
English only	30	10.9%
Other languages	0	0%
Both English and French	1	0%

== See also ==
- List of parishes in New Brunswick
