= Drummond Parish, New Brunswick =

Drummond
- Parish
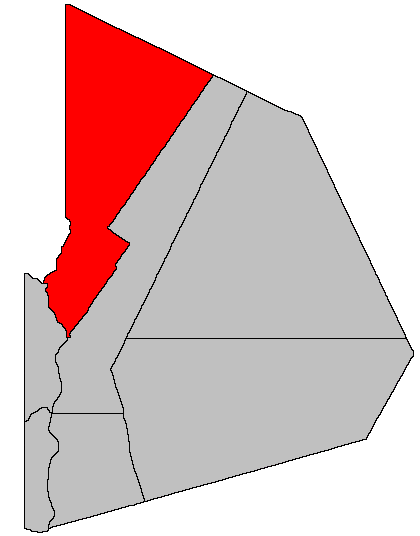
- Location within Victoria County, New Brunswick.
- Coordinates: 47.3175°N 67.51°W
- Country: Canada
- Province: New Brunswick
- County: Victoria
- Erected: 1872

Area
  - Land: 1,013.66 km^{2} (391.38 sq mi)

Population (2021)
  - Total: 2,095
  - Density: 2.1/km^{2} (5.4/sq mi)
  - Change 2016-2021: ▼2.9%
  - Dwellings: 899
- Time zone: UTC-4 (AST)
  - Summer (DST): UTC-3 (ADT)
- Figures do not include portions within the town of Grand Falls and the village of Drummond

Drummond is a geographic parish in Victoria County, New Brunswick, Canada. (Note: The Territorial Division Act divides the province into 152 parishes, the cities of Saint John and Fredericton, and one town of Grand Falls. The Interpretation Act clarifies that parishes include any local government within their borders.)

For governance purposes it is divided between the town of Grand Falls, the town of Vallée-des-Rivières, (Note: An area along Highway 17, as shown by the original map of Vallée-des-Rivières, with the unchanged boundaries for the new town as an overlay on the pre-2023 governance boundaries; this map is still available in thumbnail form on the NWRSC governance reform map page.) and the Northwest rural district, both of which are members of the Northwest Regional Service Commission.

Prior to the 2023 governance reform, for governance purposes it was divided between the village of Drummond, the town of Grand Falls, and the local service district of the parish of Drummond.

== Origin of name ==
The parish may have been named in honour of General Sir Gordon Drummond, former Governor General of the Canadas.

Drummond was originally a neighbour of Gordon Parish before the erections of Denmark and Lorne Parishes.

== History ==
Drummond was erected in 1872 from Grand Falls Parish. It included Denmark Parish.

In 1875 the county line was altered and part of Drummond was transferred to Victoria County.

In 1927 the area within the municipal limits of the town of Grand Falls was removed from Drummond.

In 1936 much of Drummond was erected as Denmark Parish. Three months later the inland boundary was simplified, returning part of Denmark to Drummond.

In 1955 part of Drummond was added to the town of Grand Falls.

== Boundaries ==
Drummond Parish is bounded:

- on the northeast by the Restigouche County line, running about 33 kilometres southeasterly from the northernmost point of Victoria County;
- on the southeast by a line beginning on the Restigouche County line at the prolongation of the southeastern line of the Fourth Tract of lands granted to the New Brunswick Railway Company, then running southwesterly along the prolongation, the Fourth Tract, and the First Tract to the northeastern line of the Seventh Tract, then southeasterly about 5.6 kilometres along the Seventh Tract and its prolongation to the prolongation of the southeastern line of Range 2 of the Burgess Settlement, then about 15 kilometres southwesterly, southeasterly, and southwesterly along the Burgess Settlement, Ennishone Settlement, and Block 52 to strike the Salmon River opposite the end of the Salmon River Road south of Davis Mill, then downstream to about 1.5 kilometres past Mill Hill Road to meet the southeastern line of a grant to John King, then southwesterly along the King grant past Route 105 to the northernmost corner of a grant to Lyman Whitehead, then southeasterly about 500 metres along the Whitehead grant, then southwesterly to the Saint John River at a point about 700 metres south of the mouth of Salmon River;
- on the west by the Saint John River;
- on the west by the Madawaska County line, running north-northeasterly and then true north to the starting point, the meeting point of Restigouche, Madawaska, and Victoria Counties;
- excepting the Mill Lease of the War Department Lands, (Note: The exact location of the Mill Lease is not stated and doesn't appear on cadastral or highway maps.) which are part of Grand Falls Town. (Note: This is the only instance in the Territorial Division Act where an incorporated town appears; Grand Falls town in the Territorial Division Act is much smaller in area than the modern municipality of Grand Falls)

== Communities ==
Communities at least partly within the parish. bold indicates an incorporated municipality

- Black Brook
- Burgess Settlement
- Caldwell
- Canton
- Davis Mill
- Desjardins Road
- **Drummond**
  - Price Road
- Ennishone
- **Grand Falls**
- Hennigar Corner
- Jardine Brook
- McManus Siding
- Quatre-Coins
- Undine
- Violette Brook
- Violette Station

== Bodies of water ==
Bodies of water (Note: Not including brooks, ponds or coves.) at least partly within the parish.

- Grande Rivière
- Little River
- Little Main Restigouche River
- Saint John River
- Salmon River
- Lac à Minet
- Basley Lake
- Gounamitz Lake
- Gull Lake
- Hammond Lake
- Little Barkerhouse Lake
- Ryan Brook Lake
- Stony Lake

== Other notable places ==
Parks, historic sites, and other noteworthy places at least partly within the parish.

- Boston Brook Airstrip
- Burgess Settlement Protected Natural Area
- Grand Falls Airport
- Petit Sault

== Demographics ==
Parish population totals do not include village of Drummond and portion within Grand Falls

=== Population ===
**Population trend**

Census	Population	Change (%)
2016	2,157	▼4.1%
2011	2,250	▼0.7%
2006	2,265	▲3.8%
2001	2,182	▼3.0%
1996	2,250	▲4.7%
1991	2,148	N/A

=== Language ===
**Mother tongue (2016)**

Language	Population	Pct (%)
French only	1,845	86.0%
English only	260	12.1%
Other languages	10	0.5%
Both English and French	30	1.4%

== See also ==
- List of parishes in New Brunswick
- Little Main Restigouche River
- Gounamitz River
