= Six-Milles, New Brunswick =

Six-Milles
- Unincorporated community
- Location of Six-Milles, New Brunswick
- Coordinates: 47.6675°N 67.45111°W
- Country: Canada
- Province: New Brunswick
- County: Restigouche
- Parish: Grimmer
- Electoral Districts Federal: Madawaska—Restigouche
- Provincial: Restigouche-La-Vallée

Government
  - Type: Local service district
- Time zone: UTC-4 (AST)
  - Summer (DST): UTC-3 (ADT)
- Area code: 506
- Access Routes: Route 265

Six-Milles is an unincorporated community in Restigouche County, New Brunswick, Canada.

== See also ==
- List of communities in New Brunswick
