= Saint-Martin-de-Restigouche, New Brunswick =

Saint-Martin-de-Restigouche
- Unincorporated community
- Location within New Brunswick.
- Coordinates: 47.56°N 67.34°W
- Country: Canada
- Province: New Brunswick
- County: Restigouche
- Parish: Saint-Quentin
- Electoral Districts Federal: Madawaska—Restigouche
- Provincial: Restigouche-La-Vallée

Government
  - Type: Local service district
- Time zone: UTC-4 (AST)
  - Summer (DST): UTC-3 (ADT)
- Postal code(s): E8A
- Area code: 506
- Highways: Route 260

Saint-Martin-de-Restigouche (French pronunciation: [sɛ̃ maʁtɛ̃ də ʁɛstiɡuʃ]) is an unincorporated community in Restigouche County, New Brunswick, Canada.

The former local service district of St. Martin de Restigouche took its name from the community but used a different spelling.

== See also ==
- List of communities in New Brunswick
