= Disappointment Lake (New Brunswick) =

Lake in New Brunswick, Canada

- Location within New Brunswick
- Location: Charlotte County, New Brunswick
- Coordinates: 45°21′42″N 66°34′34″W
- Basin countries: Canada
- Surface area: 96.6 ha (239 acres)
- Max. depth: 7.9 m (26 ft)

Disappointment Lake (French: Lac Disappointment; formerly known as Mistake Lake) is a lake located in Charlotte County, New Brunswick. It was additionally known by the Passamaquoddy peoples as Esquagamook, which translates to "End Lake", so named due to the lake being located at the Lepreau River's head.

Disappointment Lake contains brook trout, American eels, lake chubs, and white suckers.

== History ==
In 1888, parties from Indiantown secured the lake, and improvements were made to the road leading up to it. In the late 1800s, it was leased out and used as a fishing spot. The lake has been used as a fish hatchery spot, with 20,000 speckled trout being hatched in 1952.

== See also ==
- List of bodies of water of New Brunswick
