= List of bodies of water of New Brunswick =

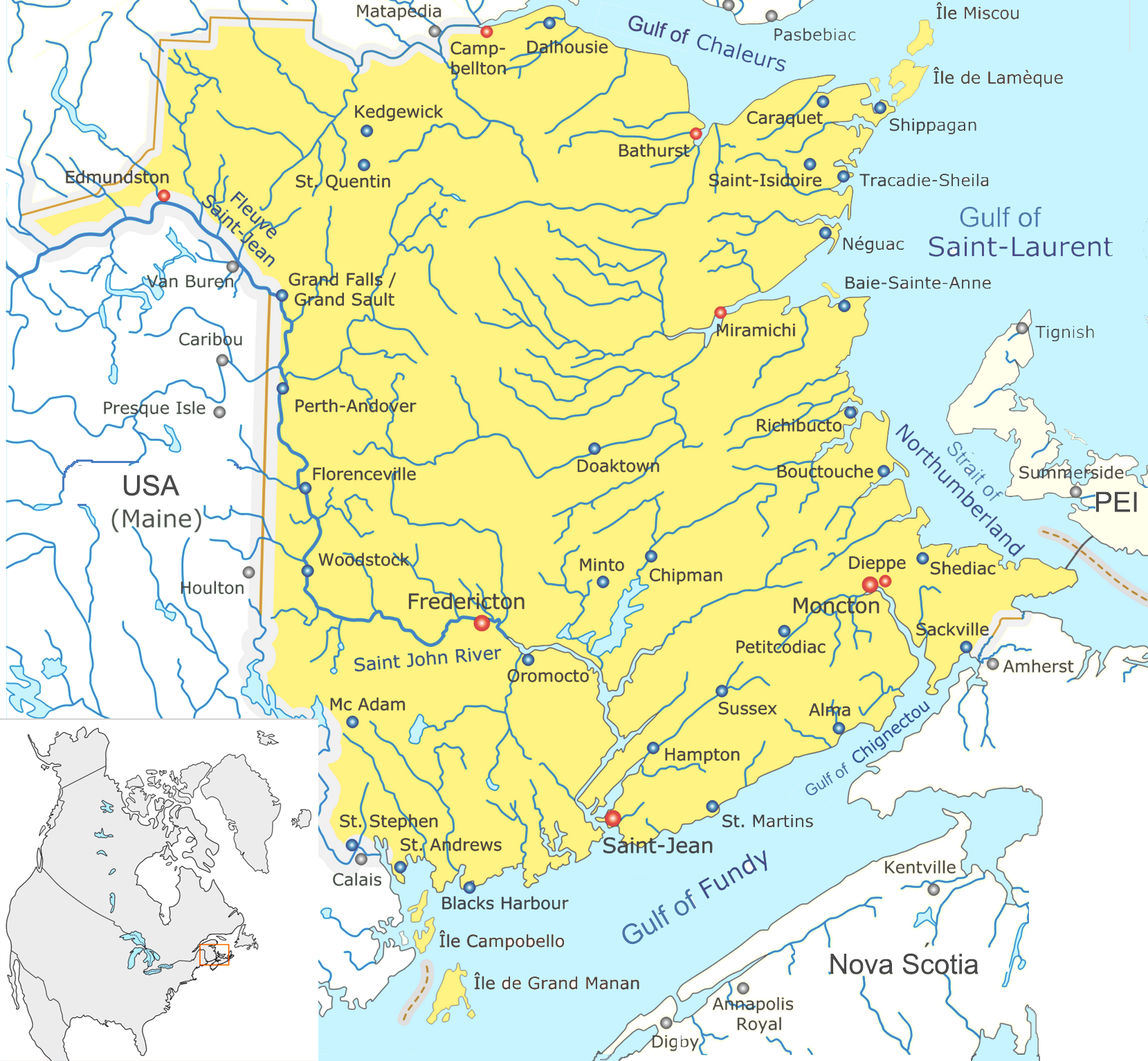
Map of New Brunswick showing the major streams and rivers

This is a List of bodies of water in the Canadian province of New Brunswick, including waterfalls.

New Brunswick receives precipitation year-round, which feeds numerous streams and rivers. There are two main discharge basins: the Gulf of Saint Lawrence to the east and north and the Bay of Fundy to the south. The major rivers are the Saint John River (Wolastoq) and the Miramichi River.

== Bodies of water ==
Bodies of water of New Brunswick

| Official name | Type 1 | Type 2 | Tributary of/ Watercourse | Start County | End or 2nd County | Deepest Point/Drop | Watershed area | Width | Notes |
|---|---|---|---|---|---|---|---|---|---|
| Anagance River | River | | Petitcodiac River | Westmorland County | Kings County | | | | |
| Aroostook River | River | | Saint John River | Victoria County | Victoria County | | | | |
| Balls Lake | Lake | | East Fundy Composite | Saint John County | Saint John County | | | | |
| Barnaby River | River | | Miramichi River | Northumberland County | Northumberland County | | | | |
| Bartholomew River | River | | Southwest Miramichi River | Northumberland County | Northumberland County | | | | |
| Bartibog River | River | | Miramichi River | Northumberland County | Northumberland County | | | | |
| Bass River | River | | Richibucto River | Kent County | Kent County | | | | |
| Batemans Brook | River | Brook | Shediac River | Westmorland County | Westmorland County | | | | |
| Bathurst Harbour | Harbour | | Nepisiguit Bay | Gloucester County | Gloucester County | | | | |
| Bay of Fundy | Bay | | Gulf of Maine | Saint John County | Charlotte County | | | | |
| Becaguimec Stream | River | Stream | Saint John River | Carleton County | Carleton County | | | | |
| Belle Kedgwick River | River | | Kedgwick River | Restigouche County | Restigouche County | | | | |
| Big Presque Isle Stream | River | Stream | Saint John River | Carleton County | Carleton County | | | | |
| Big Salmon River | River | | Bay of Fundy | Saint John County | Kings County | | | | |
| Black River | River | | Bay du Vin | Northumberland County | Northumberland County | | | | |
| Bouctouche Bay | Bay | | Bouctouche Harbour | Kent County | Kent County | | | | |
| Bouctouche Harbour | Harbour | | Northumberland Strait | Kent County | Kent County | | | | |
| Buctouche River | River | | Bouctouche Bay | Kent County | Kent County | | | | |
| Broad River | River | | Upper Salmon River | Albert County | Victoria County | | | | |
| Cains River | River | | Southwest Miramichi River | Northumberland County | Northumberland County | | | | |
| Calhoun Brook | River | Brook | Shediac River | Westmorland County | Westmorland County | | | | |
| Canaan River | River | | Washademoak Lake | Kent County | Northumberland County | | | | |
| Caraquet Bay | Bay | | Chaleur Bay | Gloucester County | Gloucester County | | | | |
| Caraquet River | River | | Caraquet Bay | Gloucester County | Gloucester County | | | | |
| Chaleur Bay | Bay | | Gulf of Saint Lawrence | Gloucester County | Restigouche County | | | | |
| Chockpish River | River | | Northumberland Strait | Kent County | Kent County | | | | |
| Coal Branch River | River | | Richibucto River | Kent County | Kent County | | | | |
| Cocagne Harbour | Harbour | | Northumberland Strait | Kent County | Kent County | | | | |
| Cocagne River | River | | Cocagne Harbour | Kent County | Westmorland County | | | | |
| Cowans Creek | River | | Pokemouche River | Gloucester County | Gloucester County | | | | |
| Disappointment Lake | Lake | | | Charlotte County | Charlotte County | | | | |
| Dungarvon River | River | | Renous River | Northumberland County | Northumberland County | | | | |
| East Branch St. Nicholas River | River | | St. Nicholas River | Kent County | Kent County | | | | |
| Eel Bay | Bay | | Chaleur Bay | Restigouche County | Restigouche County | | | | |
| Eel River | River | | Eel Bay | Restigouche County | Restigouche County | | | | |
| Eel River | River | | Saint John River | York County | York County | | | | |
| Forty-Five River | River | | Upper Salmon River | Albert County | Victoria County | | | | |
| Gounamitz River | River | | Little Main Restigouche River | Madawaska County | Victoria County | | | | |
| Grand River | River | | Saint John River | Victoria County | Madawaska County | | | | |
| Green River | River | | First Lake | Madawaska County | Madawaska County | | | | |
| Gulquac River | River | | Tobique River | Carleton County | Victoria County | | | | |
| Hammond River | River | | Kennebecasis River | Kings County | Kings County | | | | |
| Humphrey Brook | River | Brook | Petitcodiac River | Westmorland County | Westmorland County | | | | |
| Indian Falls | Waterfall | Rapids | Nepisiguit River | Northumberland County | Northumberland County | | | | |
| Irish River | River | | Bay of Fundy | Saint John County | Saint John County | | | | |
| Iroquois River | River | | Saint John River | Madawaska County | Madawaska County | | | | |
| Jackson Falls | Waterfall | Cataract | Meduxnekeag River | Gloucester County | Gloucester County | 15 m (49 ft) | | | |
| Jacquet River | River | | Chaleur Bay | Restigouche County | Restigouche County | | | | |
| Jemseg River | River | | Saint John River | Queens County | Queens County | | | | |
| Jonathan Creek | River | | Petitcodiac River | Albert County | Westmorland County | | | | |
| Kedgwick River | River | | Restigouche River | Restigouche County | Restigouche County | | | | |
| Kennebecasis River | River | | Saint John River | Albert County | Saint John County | | | | |
| Keswick River | River | | Kennebecasis River | York County | York County | | | | |
| Kouchibouguac Bay | Bay | | Northumberland Strait | Kent County | Kent County | | | | |
| Kouchibouguac River | River | | Kouchibouguac Bay | Kent County | Kent County | | | | |
| Kouchibouguacis River | River | | Kouchibouguac Bay | Kent County | Kent County | | | | |
| Little Bouctouche River | River | | Bouctouche Bay | Kent County | Kent County | | | | |
| Little Iroquois River | River | | Iroquois River | Madawaska County | Madawaska County | | | | |
| Little River | River | | Petitcodiac River | Westmorland County | Albert County | | | | |
| Little Southeast Upsalquitch River | River | | Southeast Upsalquitch River | Restigouche County | Restigouche County | | | | |
| Little Southwest Miramichi River | River | | Northwest Miramichi River | Northumberland County | Northumberland County | | | | |
| Little Tobique River | River | | Tobique River | Carleton County | Victoria County | | | | |
| Mactaquac Lake | Lake | | Saint John River | York County | York County | | | | |
| Madawaska River | River | | Saint John River | Madawaska County | Témiscouata County | | | | |
| Magaguadavic River | River | | Bay of Fundy | York County | Charlotte County | | | | |
| Mascogne River | River | | Bouctouche Harbour | Kent County | Kent County | | | | |
| McQuade Brook | River | Brook | Shediac River | Westmorland County | Westmorland County | | | | |
| Meduxnekeag River | River | | Saint John River | Carleton County | Aroostook County | | | | |
| Memramcook River | River | | Shepody Bay | Albert County | Westmorland County | | | | |
| Miramichi Bay | Bay | | Gulf of Saint Lawrence | Northumberland County | Northumberland County | | | | |
| Miramichi River | River | | Miramichi Bay | Northumberland County | Northumberland County | | | | |
| Missaguash River | River | | Isthmus of Chignecto | Westmorland County | Cumberland County | | | | |
| Molus River | River | | Richibucto River | Kent County | Kent County | | | | |
| Musquash River | River | | Bay of Fundy | Saint John County | Saint John County | | | | |
| Nackawic Stream | River | Stream | Saint John River | York County | York County | | | | |
| Napan River | River | | Miramichi River | Northumberland County | Northumberland County | | | | |
| Nashwaak River | River | | Saint John River | York County | Sunbury County | | | | |
| Nashwaaksis Stream | River | Stream | Saint John River | York County | Sunbury County | | | | |
| Nepisiguit Bay | Bay | | Chaleur Bay | Gloucester County | Gloucester County | | | | |
| Nepisiguit River | River | | Chaleur Bay | Gloucester County | Restigouche County | | | | |
| Nerepis River | River | | Saint John River | Kings County | Sunbury County | | | | |
| North Branch Gounamitz River | River | | Gounamitz River | Restigouche County | Madawaska County | | | | |
| North Branch Meduxnekeag River | River | | Meduxnekeag River | Carleton County | Aroostook County | | | | |
| North Pole Stream | River | Stream | Little Southwest Miramichi River | Restigouche County | Restigouche County | | | | |
| North Renous River | River | | Renous River | Northumberland County | Northumberland County | | | | |
| North River | River | | Petitcodiac River | Westmorland County | Westmorland County | | | | |
| Northwest Miramichi River | River | | Miramichi River | Northumberland County | Northumberland County | | | | |
| Northwest Upsalquitch River | River | | Upsalquitch River | Restigouche County | Restigouche County | | | | |
| Oromocto River | River | | Saint John River | Saint John County | Charlotte County | | | | |
| Oyster River | River | | Miramichi River | Northumberland County | Northumberland County | | | | |
| Pabineau Falls | Waterfall | Cataract | Nepisiguit River | Gloucester County | Gloucester County | 15 m (49 ft) | | | |
| Passamaquoddy Bay | Bay | | L'Etete Passage | Charlotte County | Charlotte County | | | | |
| Patapedia River | River | | Restigouche River | Restigouche County | Restigouche County | | | | |
| Petitcodiac River | River | | Shepody Bay | Albert County | Westmorland County | | | | |
| Point Wolfe River | River | | Bay of Fundy | Albert County | Kings County | | | | |
| Pokemouche River | River | | Inkerman Lake | Restigouche County | Restigouche County | | | | |
| Pokiok Falls | Waterfall | Cascade | Pokiok Stream | York County | York County | 2 m (6.6 ft) | | | |
| Pokiok Stream | River | Stream | Mactaquac Lake | York County | York County | | | | |
| Pollett River | River | | Petitcodiac River | Westmorland County | Kings County | | | | |
| Quiddy River | River | | Kennebecasis River | Kings County | Kings County | | | | |
| Renous River | River | | Southwest Miramichi River | Northumberland County | Northumberland County | | | | |
| Restigouche River | River | | Chaleur Bay | Restigouche County | Restigouche County | | | | |
| Reversing Falls | Waterfall | Rapids | Saint John River | Saint John County | Saint John County | | | | |
| Richibucto Harbour | Harbour | | Gulf of Saint Lawrence | Kent County | Kent County | | | | |
| Richibucto River | River | | Richibucto Harbour | Kent County | Kent County | | | | |
| Rimouski River | River | | St. Lawrence River | Restigouche County | Rimouski-Neigette RCM, Quebec | | 1,635 km^{2} (631 sq mi) | | Only 2.8 km (1.7 mi) of the river flows in New Brunswick |
| River de Chute | River | | Saint John River | Carleton County | Victoria County | | | | |
| Rivière du Nord | River | | Caraquet Bay | Gloucester County | Restigouche County | | | | |
| Rivière Verte | River | | Saint John River | Madawaska County | Madawaska County | | | | |
| Rusagonis Stream | River | Stream | Oromocto River | Saint John County | Charlotte County | | | | |
| St. Croix River | River | | St. Andrews Harbour | Charlotte County | York County | | | | |
| Saint Francis River | River | | Saint John River | Carleton County | Victoria County | | | | |
| Saint John River | River | | Saint John Harbour | Saint John County | Madawaska County | | | | |
| Saint-Charles River | River | | Richibucto Harbour | Kent County | Kent County | | | | |
| Salmon River | River | | Bay of Fundy | Albert County | Victoria County | | | | |
| Scoudouc River | River | | Shediac Harbour | Westmorland County | Westmorland County | | | | |
| Serpentine River | River | | Nepisiguit River | Restigouche County | Restigouche County | | | | |
| Serpentine River | River | | Tobique River | Carleton County | Victoria County | | | | |
| Sevogle River | River | | Northwest Miramichi River | Northumberland County | Northumberland County | | | | |
| Shediac Bay | Bay | | Northumberland Strait | Westmorland County | Westmorland County | | | | |
| Shediac Harbour | Harbour | | Shediac Bay | Westmorland County | Westmorland County | | | | |
| Shediac River | River | | Shediac Bay | Westmorland County | Westmorland County | | | | |
| Shepody Bay | Bay | | Bay of Fundy | Albert County | Westmorland County | | | | |
| Shepody River | River | | Shepody Bay | Albert County | Albert County | | | | |
| Shogomoc Stream | River | | Saint John River | Carleton County | Victoria County | | | | |
| South Branch Kedgwick River | River | | Kedgwick River | Restigouche County | Restigouche County | | | | |
| South Branch Pokemouche River | River | | Pokemouche River | Gloucester County | Gloucester County | | | | |
| South Branch St. Nicholas River | River | | St. Nicholas River | Kent County | Kent County | | | | |
| Southeast Upsalquitch River | River | | Upsalquitch River | Restigouche County | Restigouche County | | | | |
| Southwest Miramichi River | River | | Miramichi River | Northumberland County | Northumberland County | | | | |
| St. Andrews Harbour | Harbour | | Passamaquoddy Bay | Charlotte County | York County | | | | |
| St. Charles River | River | | Richibucto River | Kent County | Kent County | | | | |
| St. Nicholas River | River | | Richibucto River | Kent County | Kent County | | | | |
| Tabusintac River | River | | Tabusintac Bay | Northumberland County | Northumberland County | | | | |
| Tantramar River | River | | Bay of Fundy | Albert County | Victoria County | | | | |
| Taxis River | River | | Southwest Miramichi River | Northumberland County | Northumberland County | | | | |
| Tay River | River | | Nashwaak River | York County | Sunbury County | | | | |
| Tobique River | River | | Saint John River | Carleton County | Victoria County | | | | |
| Tracadie River | River | | Shediac River | Westmorland County | Westmorland County | | | | |
| Upper Salmon River | River | | Bay of Fundy | Albert County | Victoria County | | | | |
| Upsalquitch River | River | | Restigouche River | Restigouche County | Restigouche County | | | | |
| Wapske River | River | | Tobique River | Carleton County | Victoria County | | | | |
| Waugh River | River | | Pokemouche River | Gloucester County | Gloucester County | | | | |
| West Branch Gounamitz River | River | | Gounamitz River | Restigouche County | Madawaska County | | | | |
| West Branch St. Nicholas River | River | | St. Nicholas River | Kent County | Kent County | | | | |
| Western Passage | Inlet | | Passamaquoddy Bay | Charlotte County | Charlotte County | | | | |

== See also ==
- List of lakes of Canada
- List of waterfalls in Canada
- List of mountains in New Brunswick
- List of islands of New Brunswick
- Geography of New Brunswick
