= Gounamitz River =

Location
- Country: Canada

Physical characteristics
- Source
  - location: Rivière-Verte Parish, New Brunswick, Madawaska County, New Brunswick
  - coordinates: 47°37′23″N 67°54′30″W
  - elevation: 249 m (817 ft)
- Mouth
  - location: Drummond Parish, Victoria County, New Brunswick
  - coordinates: 47°31′26″N 67°38′29″W
  - elevation: 142 m (466 ft)
- Length: 28.0 km (17.4 mi)

Basin features
- Tributaries
  - left: (from the confluence) One Mile Brook, Bells Brook, Big Brook, Balm of Gilead Brook, Benny Brook, Dave Richards Brook, Cyr Brook, Letourneau Brook, North Branch Gounamitz River, West Branch Gounamitz River, Caribou Brook.
  - right: (from the confluence) Dunbar Brook, Falls Brook, McLaughlin Brook.

The Gounamitz River is a tributary of the head of the Restigouche River, flowing in the Northwest of New Brunswick, in Canada.

The course of Gounamitz river crosses:

- Madawaska County: Rivière-Verte, Sainte-Anne Parish
- Restigouche County: Saint-Quentin Parish
- Victoria County: Drummond Parish

== Geography ==
The Gounamitz River rises at the confluence of the North Branch Gounamitz River and West Branch Gounamitz River. This source is located in the Rivière-Verte Parish, in Madawaska County.

This source is located at:

- 2.6 kilometres (1.6 mi) South of the southern boundary of the Saint-Quentin Parish;
- 24.0 kilometres (14.9 mi) East of the confluence of Lake First;
- 29.9 kilometres (18.6 mi) Southwest of the confluence of the Little Main Restigouche River which is the head of the Restigouche River;
- 21.6 kilometres (13.4 mi) Northwest from the confluence of the Gounamitz river;
- 36.6 kilometres (22.7 mi) East of the southern boundary of the Quebec.

Gounamitz river flows in forest zone, more or less in parallel in the southwest side to the Kedgwick River.

From the source, "Gounamitz river" flows on 28.0 kilometres (17.4 mi), according to these segments:

- 4.6 kilometres (2.9 mi) Eastward in the Rivière-Verte Parish, (Madawaska County) up to Cyr stream (from the West);
- 2.8 kilometres (1.7 mi) Eastward up to Dave Richards Brook (from the West);
- 1.7 kilometres (1.1 mi) Eastward to the edge of the Saint-Quentin (Restigouche County);
- 2.5 kilometres (1.6 mi) to the East in the Saint-Quentin up to "Balm of Gilead Brooke" (from the West);
- 4.5 kilometres (2.8 mi) to the Southeast, up to Big Brook (from the West);
- 1.5 kilometres (0.93 mi) to the Southeast receiving the waters of Falls Brook (from the Southwest) to the boundary of the Sainte-Anne Parish;
- 4.5 kilometres (2.8 mi) to the southeast, to the limit of the Drummond Parish (Victoria County, New Brunswick);
- 5.9 kilometres (3.7 mi). To the south east, to the confluence of the Gounamitz River

The "Gounamitz River" pours on the Northwest shore of the Little Main Restigouche River, in the Drummond Parish, Victoria County, New Brunswick.

The confluence of the "Gounamitz River" is located at:

- 18.3 kilometres (11.4 mi) Southwest of the confluence of the Kedgwick River and Little Main Restigouche River;
- 17.4 kilometres (10.8 mi) West of the village center of Saint-Quentin;
- 24.7 kilometres (15.3 mi) Southwest of the village center of Kedgwick;
- 65.0 kilometres (40.4 mi) East of downtown of Edmundston;
- 93.1 kilometres (57.8 mi) Southwest of the Campbellton, New Brunswick bridge, crossing the Restigouche River.

== See also ==
- Restigouche County
- Victoria County, New Brunswick
- List of rivers of New Brunswick
- Gulf of Saint Lawrence
- Restigouche River
- Little Main Restigouche River
- North Branch Gounamitz River
- West Branch Gounamitz River
- Rivière-Verte Parish
- Saint-Quentin Parish
- Saint-Quentin Parish
- Drummond Parish
