= Balls Lake =

Lake in New Brunswick, Canada

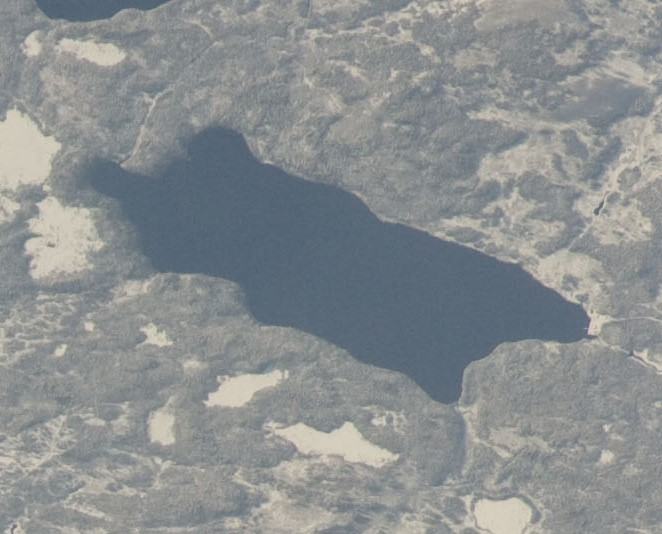
- Balls Lake photographed in December 2009 during ISS Expedition 22

- Location within New Brunswick
- Location: Simonds Parish, Saint John County, New Brunswick
- Coordinates: 45°14′17.4″N 65°53′44.6″W
- Part of: East Fundy Composite
- Basin countries: Canada
- Surface area: 128.83 ha (318.3 acres)

Balls Lake is a lake located in Simonds Parish, Saint John County, New Brunswick. Located just a few kilometers from the city limits of Saint John, Balls Lake has its own watershed, with the lake draining to McKenzie Brook. Balls Lake has been recorded containing multiple fish species including brook trout, lake chubs, and American eels. Additionally, it is part of the Balls Lake Formation, a formation dating back to around the Carboniferous period.

== History ==
As early as the 19th century, Balls Lake has had its own fishing club known as the Balls Lake Fishing Club, which previously had its own club house until it was destroyed during a forest fire around June 4, 1903. Following a meeting held by the club later that year, a new club house was set to be built. Balls Lake additionally had a lumber mill operating as recent as the late 19th century. The lake has also had speckled trout introduced to it, with 518 being introduced from Big Salmon River in 1951.

== See also ==
- List of bodies of water of New Brunswick
