= Rang-Sept, New Brunswick =

Rang-Sept
- Unincorporated community
- Location of Rang-Sept, New Brunswick
- Coordinates: 47.666667°N 67.342777°W
- Country: Canada
- Province: New Brunswick
- County: Restigouche
- Parish: Grimmer
- Electoral Districts Federal: Madawaska—Restigouche
- Provincial: Restigouche-La-Vallée

Government
  - Type: Local service district
- Time zone: UTC-4 (AST)
  - Summer (DST): UTC-3 (ADT)
- Area code: 506
- Access Routes: Chemin Rang 7 & 8 via Route 17

Rang-Sept is an unincorporated community in Restigouche County, New Brunswick, Canada.

== See also ==
- List of communities in New Brunswick
