= Jonathan Creek (New Brunswick) =

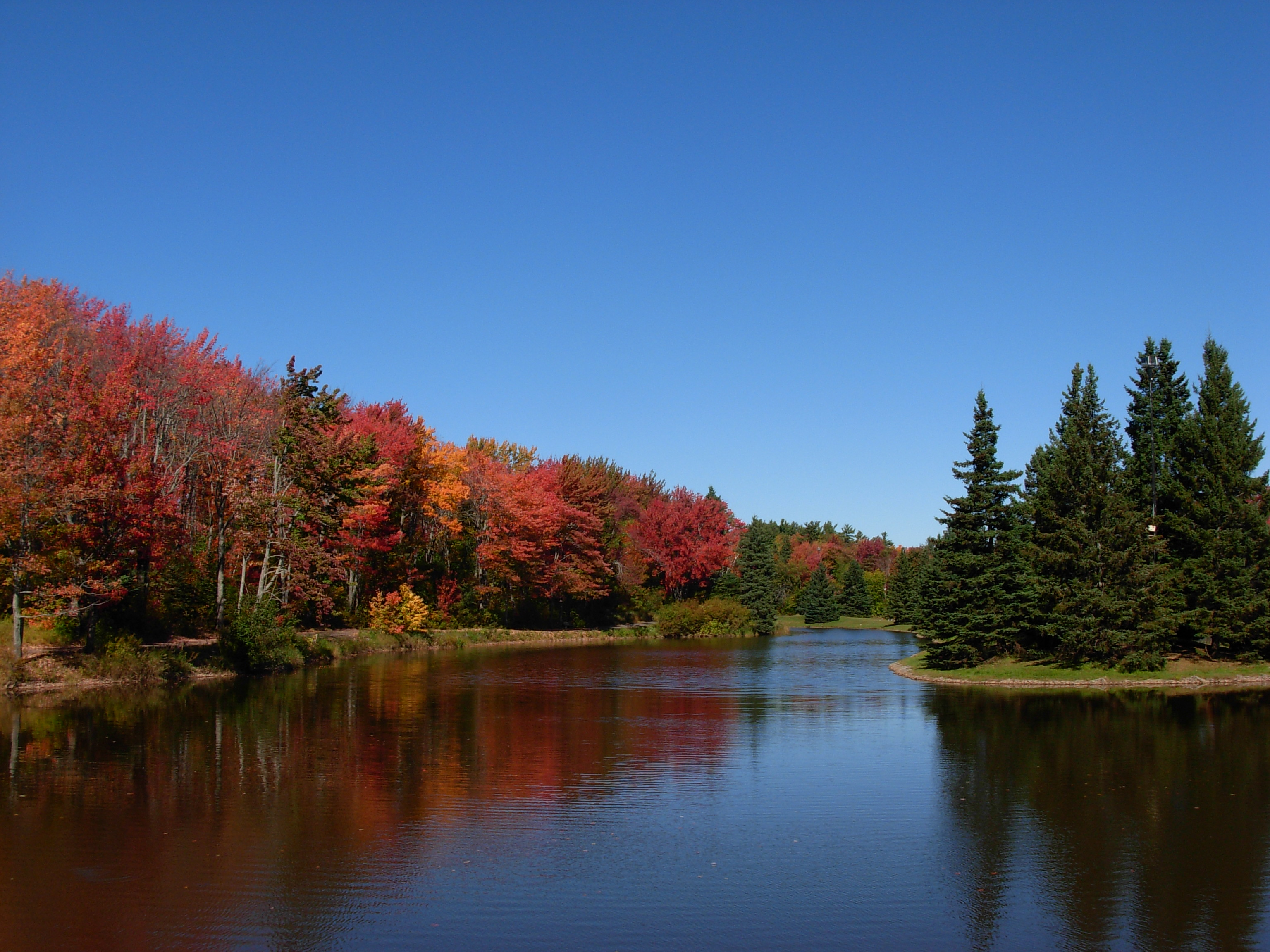
- Jonathan Creek in Moncton's Centennial Park

Location
- Country: Canada
- Province: New Brunswick

Physical characteristics
- Mouth
  - location: Jones Lake
- Basin size: 50 km^{2} (19 sq mi)

Basin features
- River system: Petitcodiac River

Jonathan Creek is a tributary of the Petitcodiac River in New Brunswick. The creek's watershed area is around 50 km^{2}. The majority of Jonathan Creek flows through the city of Moncton, eventually joining Jones Lake. Because of its close proximity to commercial and residential areas, water run off and bank erosion have impacted the condition of Jonathan Creek. In 2003, the city of Moncton pleaded guilty to environmental charges regarding leachate from an out of service landfill being found in Jonathan Creek.

== See also ==
- List of rivers of New Brunswick
