= Saint-Quentin, New Brunswick =

Saint-Quentin
- Town
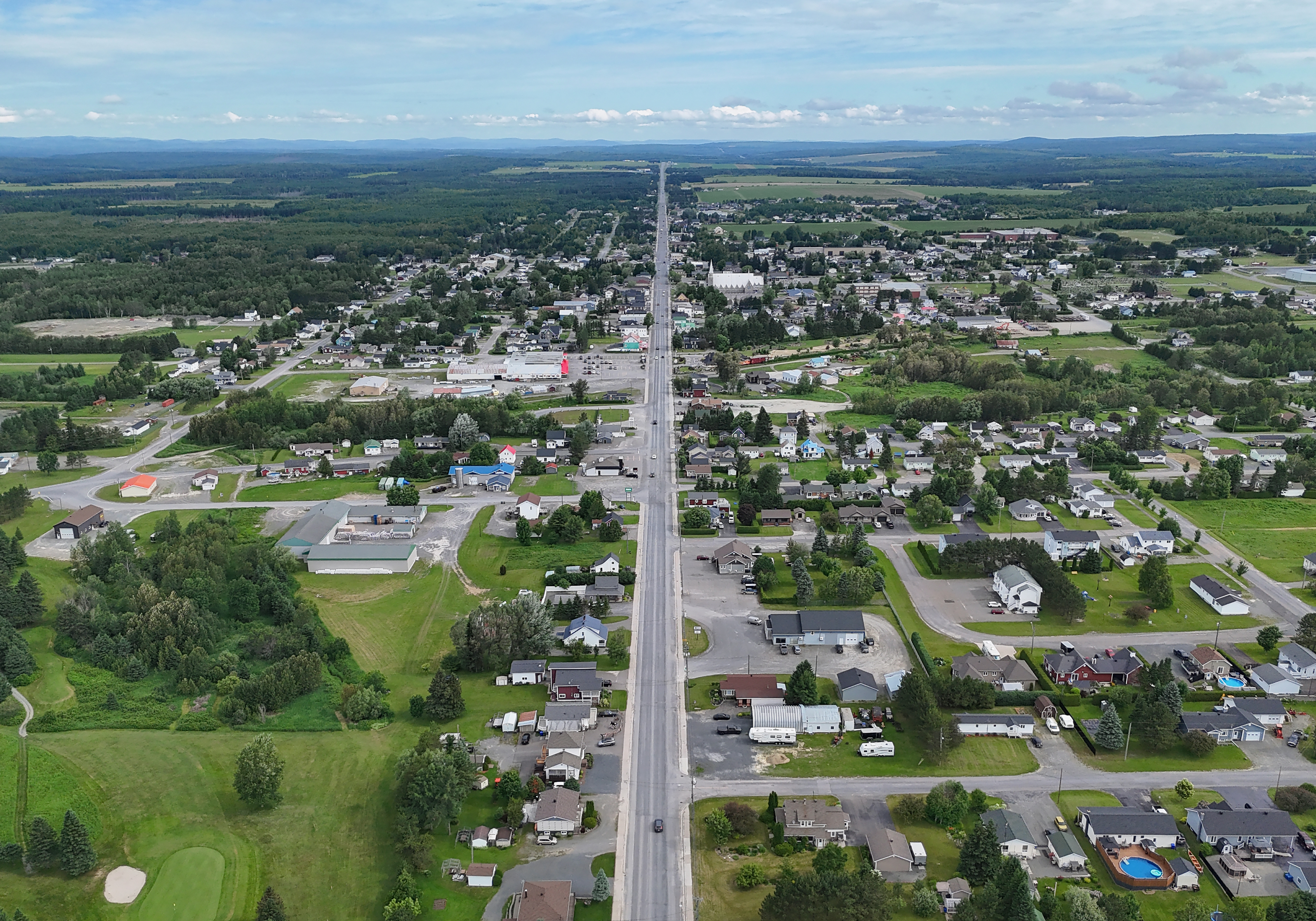

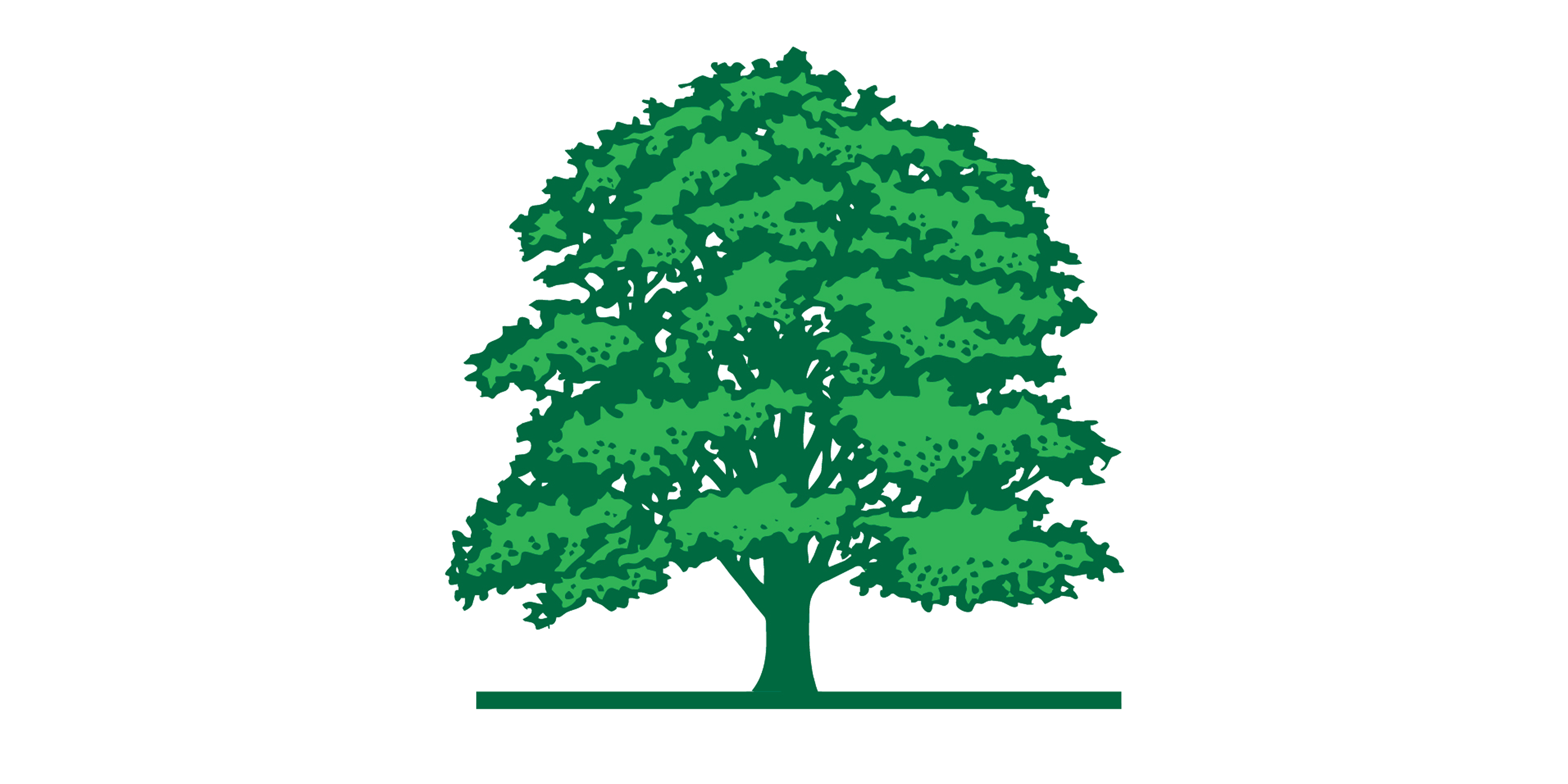
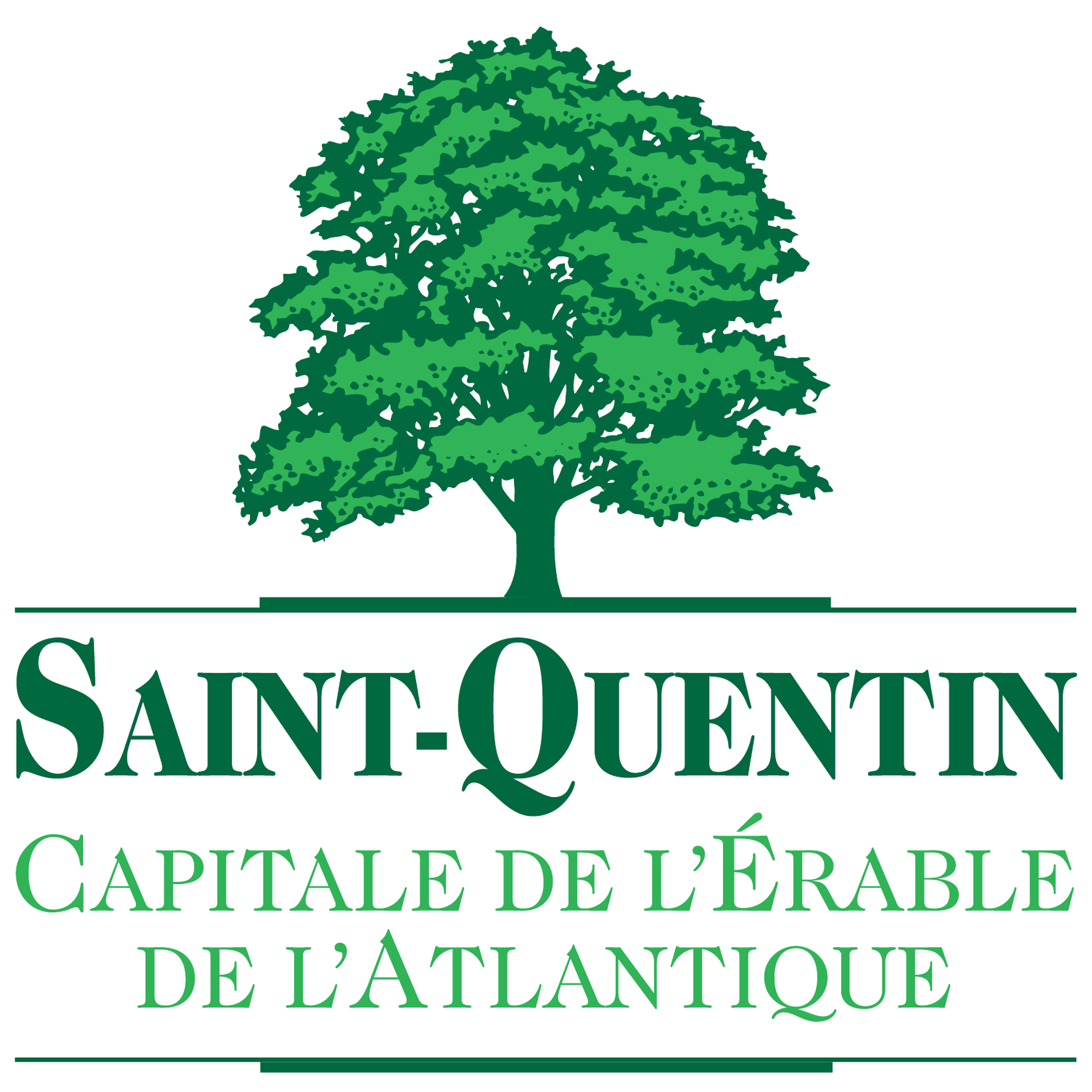
- Flag Seal
- Nickname: The maple syrup capital of Atlantic Canada
- Location in New Brunswick.
- Coordinates: 47.51175°N 67.39014°W
- Country: Canada
- Province: New Brunswick
- County: Restigouche
- Parish: Saint-Quentin
- Founded: 1910
- Local improvement district: 1947
- Village: 1966
- Town: 1996
- Electoral Districts Federal: Madawaska—Restigouche
- Provincial: Restigouche West

Government
  - Type: Saint-Quentin Town Council
  - Mayor: Jean-François Martel
  - Councillors: List of Members: Janick Cyr; Daniel Dubé; Marielle Levesque; Alain Martel; Danny Perron; Rock Alain Poirier

Area
  - Total: 4.24 km^{2} (1.64 sq mi)
- Elevation: 283 m (928 ft)

Population (2021)
  - Total: 2,141
  - Density: 504.7/km^{2} (1,307/sq mi)
  - Change (2016–21): ▼2.4%
  - Dwellings: 1,015
- Time zone: UTC-4 (AST)
  - Summer (DST): UTC-3 (ADT)
- Postal code(s): E8A
- Area code: 506
- Highways: Route 17; Route 180
- NTS Map: 021O11
- GNBC Code: DAEGG
- Website: saintquentin.nb.ca

Saint-Quentin (French pronunciation: [sɛ̃ kɑ̃tɛ̃]) is a town in northern New Brunswick, Canada.

Saint-Quentin is in the Restigouche region of the Appalachian Mountains, 50 kilometres west of Mount Carleton, the province's highest elevation.

The great majority of individuals in the area speak French.

On 1 January 2023, Saint-Quentin annexed the local service district (LSD) of St. Martin de Restigouche and part of the LSD of the parish of Saint-Quentin Revised census figures have not been released.

== History ==
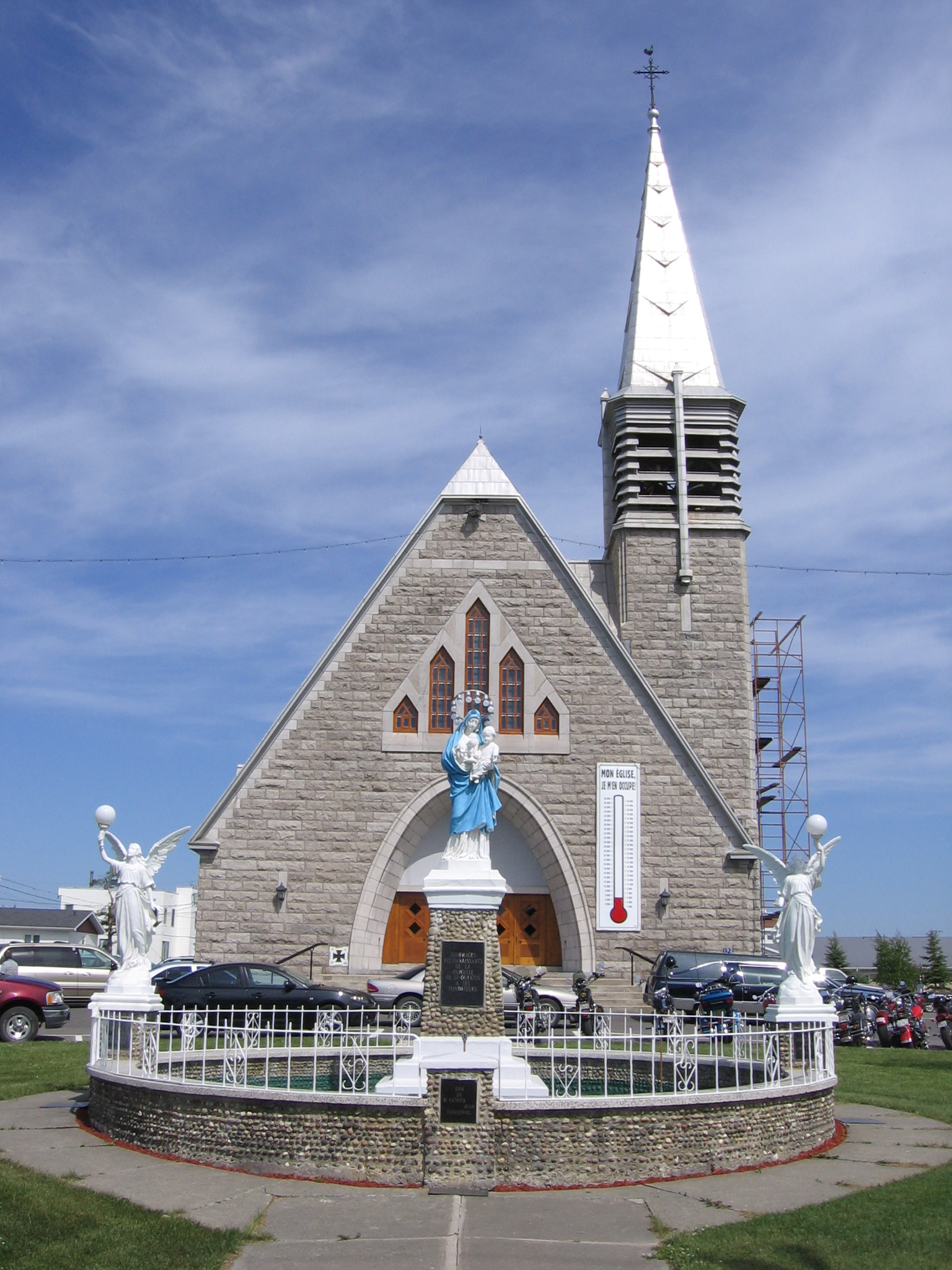
Saint Sacrement Catholic Church

In 1897, the Restigouche and Western Railway Company embarked on a project to build a railway linking Campbellton and St-Léonard, two towns in northwestern New Brunswick. The progress of its construction sent workers deep into the forest. In 1909, Simon Gallant, an Acadian working as a blacksmith, decided to settle his family by a stream near Five Fingers where he found a stray cow.

At the same time, authorities began to worry about the emigration of Québec families to the United States and to Western Canada, resulting in a population decline. Msgr. Joseph Arthur Melanson, the largest settler and missionary in Saint-Quentin Parish, originally named Anderson Siding, launched a large program of colonization. Valuing farming and agriculture, he encouraged Acadien and Québécois families to settle in the Restigouche region of New Brunswick on the fertile lands along the length of the newly built train line.

The village of Anderson Siding was founded in 1910; its first mass was held in Simon Gallant's round log cabin in the forest. The first chapel was built in 1911, its first post office in 1912, its first school in 1913, and its first church in 1918. The name Anderson Siding was changed to the present name of Saint-Quentin in 1919 in commemoration of the Canadian victory in the French town of the same name during the Battle of the Somme in the First World War. Its first hospital, Hôtel-Dieu Saint-Joseph, was built in 1947 and is still in operation today.

Saint-Quentin was incorporated as a district in 1947, as a village in 1966, and as a town in 1992.

== Demographics ==
In the 2021 Census of Population conducted by Statistics Canada, Saint-Quentin had a population of 2,141 living in 976 of its 1,015 total private dwellings, a change of −2.4% from its 2016 population of 2,194. With a land area of 4.24 km^{2} (1.64 sq mi), it had a population density of 505.0/km^{2} (1,307.8/sq mi) in 2021.

Saint-Quentin, NB Historical populations
Year	Pop.	±%
1981	2,334	—
1986	2,264	−3.0%
1991	2,269	+0.2%
1996	2,424	+6.8%
2001	2,280	−5.9%
2006	2,250	−1.3%
2011	2,095	−6.9%
2016	2,194	+4.7%

=== Language ===
Mother tongue language (2011)

Language	Population	Pct (%)
French only	1,945	98.23%
English only	25	1.26%
Both English and French	5	0.25%
Other languages	10	0.50%

== Industry ==
Logging of the area's forests is Saint-Quentin's largest industry. The two sawmills, Groupe Savoie and North American Forest Products, are Saint-Quentin's largest employers, employing 400 and 225 employees respectively. Agriculture is another major industry in the Saint-Quentin region. Livestock is raised for dairy, beef and pork production, and potatoes, grain and hay are grown on the area's many farms. The production of maple syrup and other maple sugar products is the third major industry in the region; there are over 35 commercial maple plantations as well as 25 traditional sugar shacks in the area.

== Tourism ==
=== Festival Western ===
Since 1984, Saint-Quentin has hosted the Festival Western (Western Festival) in mid-July of each year, the largest Western-themed festival of its kind in New Brunswick. Run by Le Festival Western de Saint-Quentin, Inc., it now includes rodeo, a parade, fireworks, children's activities and much more. The largest event is the "Pow-Pow", a flea market and gathering of local musicians and performers which takes place on Rue Canada, the main street of the town, which is closed to traffic for the occasion.

=== Old railway station ===
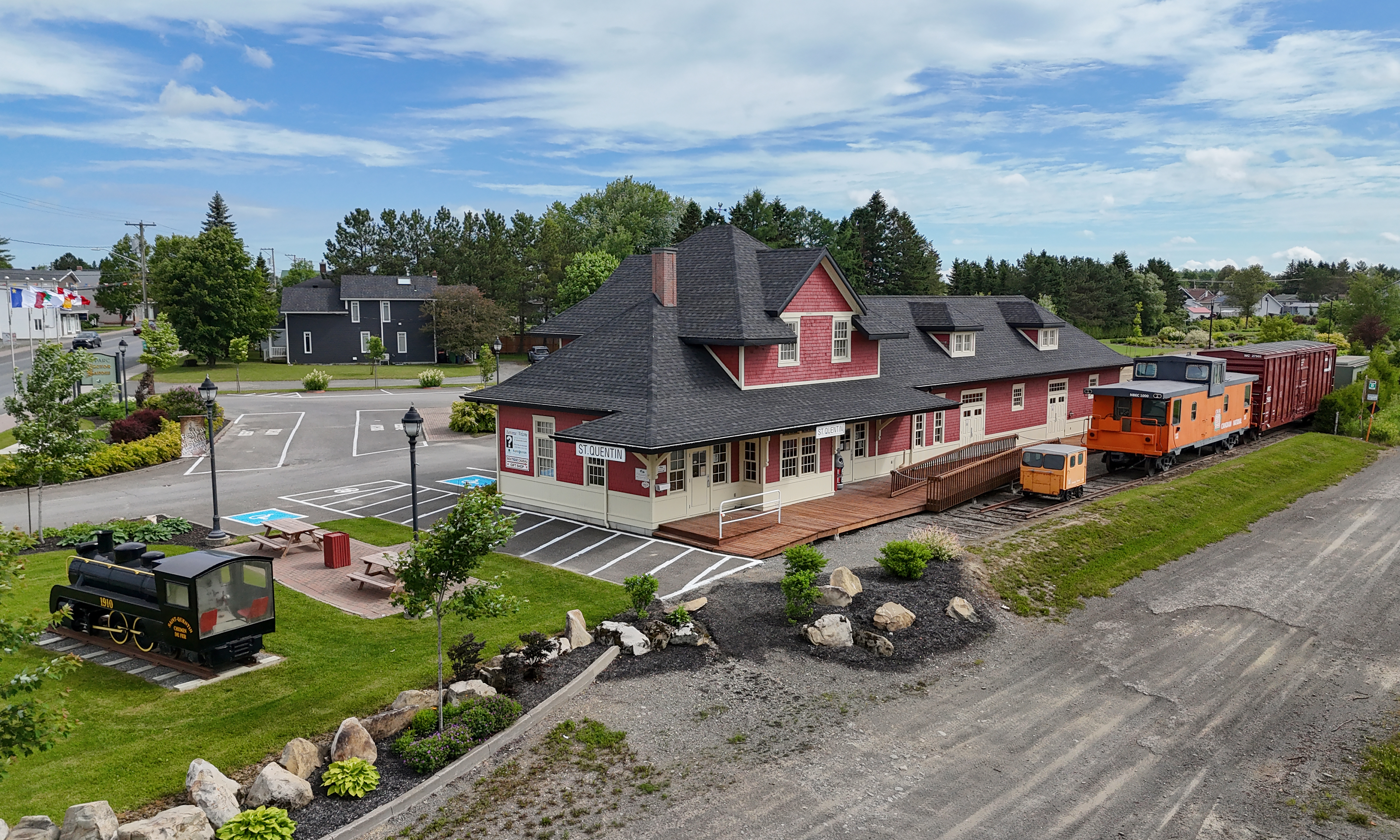
Former train station

In 2005, the former railway station, which was reconstructed in its original location, reopened as a tourist centre as well as the offices of the Chamber of Commerce and the Festival Western. The route of the train tracks, which have been removed, has been transformed into a trail for walking, bicycling, and riding all-terrain vehicles and snowmobiles.

=== Other events and activities ===
- The Festival de l'Érable (Maple Festival), launched in 2004, takes place in the spring of each year, the maple sugar season, and includes tours of maple sugarbushes, shacks and refineries, as well as sawmills which process maple wood. In addition, it includes a market where vendors sell maple products, including syrup, sugar, salad dressing, and maple-flavoured alcoholic beverages.
- A Carnival d'Hiver (Winter Carnival) is held in February and comprises winter-themed activities.
- Golfing at the local golf course and riding ATVs and snowmobiles are popular activities.
