= Little Main Restigouche River =

Location
- Country: Canada

Physical characteristics
- Source
  - location: Rivière-Verte Parish, New Brunswick, Madawaska County, New Brunswick
  - coordinates: 47°35′55″N 68°01′05″W
  - elevation: 377 m (1,237 ft)
- Mouth
  - location: Grimmer Parish, Restigouche County, New Brunswick
  - coordinates: 47°39′51″N 67°29′29″W
  - elevation: 118 m (387 ft)
- Length: 85.1 km (52.9 mi)

Basin features
- Tributaries
  - left: (from the confluence) Upper Four Mile Brook, Seven Mile Brook, Eightmile Brook, MacFarlane Brook, Gounamitz River, Taylor Brook, McIntosh Brook, Ouellette Gulch, Rocky Brook, Cedar Brook, Little John Brook, Big John Brook, Clear Brook, Wilson Brook, Alex Brook, Yellow Brook
  - right: (from the confluence) Five Finger Brook, Lower Four Mile Brook, Jardine Brook, Bernie Gulch, Boston Brook, Skin Gulch, Hunter Brook, Wagansis Brook, Brown Brook, Russell Brook, Goldstream Brook, Therrien Gulch

The Little Main Restigouche River is a tributary of the head of the Restigouche River, flowing in Madawaska County, Victoria County and Restigouche County, in Northwest of New Brunswick, in Canada.

The course of the river passes successively in:

- Madawaska County: Rivière-Verte Parish, Notre-Dame-de-Lourdes and Sainte-Anne Parish;
- Victoria County, New Brunswick: Drummond Parish;
- Restigouche County: Saint-Quentin Parish and Grimmer Parish.

== Geography ==
The "Little Main Restigouche River" originates from a mountain stream of Madawaska County, located at the South of a watershed line to which the Caribou Creek (tributary of the Gounamitz West Branch River) drains the North side and the Main Branch (a tributary of the Little Forks Branch Green river) drains the West side.

This source is located at:

- 16.6 kilometres (10.3 mi) East of the confluence of Lake First;
- 36.6 kilometres (22.7 mi) Northeast of the city center of Edmundston;
- 41.3 kilometres (25.7 mi) Northeast of the confluence of the "Little Main Restigouche River";
- 28.4 kilometres (17.6 mi) East of the southern boundary of the province of Quebec.

From the source, the "Little Main Restigouche River" flows on 85.1 kilometres (52.9 mi):

Upper Course of the river (segment of 40.3 kilometres (25.0 mi))

- 13.9 kilometres (8.6 mi) to the Southwest, in the Rivière-Verte (Madawaska County) up to Yellow Creek;
- 2.5 kilometres (1.6 mi) to the Southeast, up to Therrien Gulch (from the Southwest);
- 3.3 kilometres (2.1 mi) to the Northeast, up to Alex Brook (from the West);
- 2.5 kilometres (1.6 mi) Eastward to Goldstream Brook (from the Southwest);
- 1.6 kilometres (0.99 mi) to the East, up to the limit of Sainte-Anne Parish, in Restigouche County;
- 2.7 kilometres (1.7 mi) to the East in the Sainte-Anne Parish up to Wilson Brook (from the West);
- 1.1 kilometres (0.68 mi) to the Northeast, up to Claire Brook (from the West);
- 3.4 kilometres (2.1 mi) to the Southeast, up to Russell Brook (from the West);
- 2.5 kilometres (1.6 mi) to the Southeast, up to Brown Brook (from the Southwest);
- 0.5 kilometres (0.31 mi) Eastward to limit the Notre-Dame-de-Lourdes Parish (Madawaska County);
- 6.3 kilometres (3.9 mi) to the East, in the Notre-Dame-de-Lourdes Parish up to Wagansis Brook (from the Southeast);

Middle course of the river (segment of 21.7 kilometres (13.5 mi))

- 2.8 kilometres (1.7 mi) Northward in the Notre-Dame-de-Lourdes Parish, up to Cedar Brook (from the West);
- 3.1 kilometres (1.9 mi) to the Northeast, up to Hunter Brook (from the Southeast);
- 1.4 kilometres (0.87 mi) to the Northeast up to Rocky Brook (from the West);
- 8.3 kilometres (5.2 mi) to the Northeast, up to the limit of the Drummond Parish of Victoria County, New Brunswick;
- 6.1 kilometres (3.8 mi) to the Northeast in the Drummond Parish, up to the confluence of the Gounamitz River (from the West);

Lower course of the river (segment of 23.1 kilometres (14.4 mi))

From the confluence of the Gounamitz River, the "Little Main Restigouche River" flows on:

- 1.6 kilometres (0.99 mi) to the Northeast in the Drummond Parish, to Boston Brook (from the Southeast);
- 1.9 kilometres (1.2 mi) to the Northeast bypassing the County Line Island up to the limit of Saint-Quentin;
- 8.6 kilometres (5.3 mi) to the Northeast in the Saint-Quentin, up to the limit of the Grimmer Parish;
- 4.6 kilometres (2.9 mi) to the Northeast in the Grimmer Parish, up to the Lower Four Mile Brook;
- 4.2 kilometres (2.6 mi) to the Northeast, up to Five Finger Brook (from the southeast);
- 2.2 kilometres (1.4 mi) to the Northeast, up to the confluence of the "Little Main Restigouche River".

The "Little Main Restigouche River" flows into a river curve on the South bank of the Restigouche River. The "Little Main Restigouche River" and Kedgwick River have the same confluence which is the head of the Restigouche River. However, some geographers consider the "Little Main Restigouche River" is the continuation of upper Restigouche River.

The confluence of "Little Main Restigouche River" is located at:

- 11.2 kilometres (7.0 mi) West of the village center of Kedgwick;
- 20.7 kilometres (12.9 mi) South of the confluence of the Patapédia River, which is located at the border between Quebec and New Brunswick;
- 74.4 kilometres (46.2 mi) Southwest Bridge of Campbellton, New Brunswick, crossing the Restigouche River.

== See also ==
Media related to Category: Little Main Restigouche River at Wikimedia Commons

- List of rivers of New Brunswick
- Gulf of Saint Lawrence
