= New Brunswick Route 260 =

Highway in New Brunswick, Canada

Route 260

Route information
- Maintained by New Brunswick Department of Transportation
- Length: 22.0 km (13.7 mi)
- Existed: 1965–present

Major junctions
- South end: Route 17 in Rang-Douze-Sud
- Route 180 in Five Fingers
- North end: Route 17 in Kedgwick

Location
- Country: Canada
- Province: New Brunswick
- Counties: Restigouche

Highway system
- Provincial highways in New Brunswick; Former routes
← Route 255	→ Route 265

Route 260 is a 22 km (14 mi)-long local highway in northwestern New Brunswick, Canada.

== Communities along Route 260 ==
- Rang-Douze-Sud
- Rang-Quatorze
- Limerick
- Saint-Martin-de-Restigouche
- Thibault
- Kedgwick

== See also ==
- List of New Brunswick provincial highways
