= New Brunswick Route 265 =

Highway in New Brunswick, Canada

Route 265

Route information
- Maintained by New Brunswick Department of Transportation
- Length: 13.0 km (8.1 mi)
- Existed: 1965–present

Major junctions
- West end: Kedgwick River
- East end: Route 17 in Kedgwick

Location
- Country: Canada
- Province: New Brunswick
- Counties: Restigouche

Highway system
- Provincial highways in New Brunswick; Former routes
← Route 260	→ Route 275

Route 265 is a 13-kilometre-long (8.1 mi) local highway in northwestern New Brunswick, Canada.

== Communities along Route 265 ==
- Kedgwick River
- Six-Milles
- Quatre-Milles
- Rang-Double-Nord

== See also ==
- List of New Brunswick provincial highways
