= Rivière-Verte, New Brunswick =

Rivière-Verte
- Neighbourhood
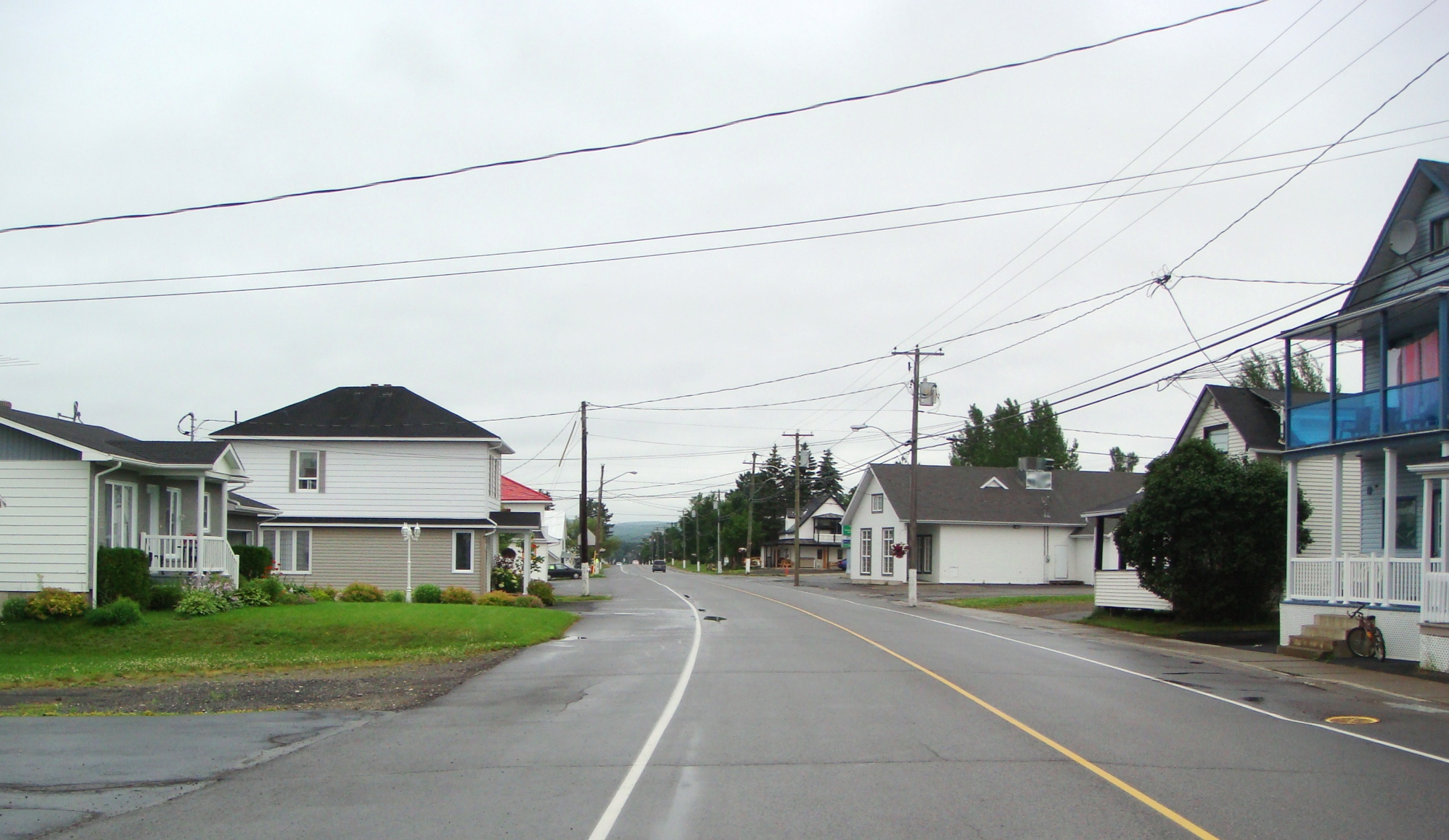

- Location within New Brunswick.
- Coordinates: 47°19′N 68°09′W
- Country: Canada
- Province: New Brunswick
- County: Madawaska
- Parish: Rivière-Verte
- City: Edmundston
- Village Status: 1966
- Electoral Districts Federal: Madawaska—Restigouche
- Provincial: Restigouche-La-Vallée

Area
  - Land: 6.91 km^{2} (2.67 sq mi)

Population (2021)
  - Total: 744
  - Density: 107.7/km^{2} (279/sq mi)
  - Change (2016–21): ▲2.8%
  - Dwellings: 373
- Time zone: UTC-4 (AST)
  - Summer (DST): UTC-3 (ADT)
- Postal code(s): E7C
- Area code: 506
- Highways: Route 2 (TCH); Route 144
- Website: www.riviere-verte.ca

Rivière-Verte (French pronunciation: [ʁivjɛʁ vɛʁt]) is a neighbourhood in Edmundston. It held village status prior to 2023.

It is 15 kilometres southeast of downtown Edmundston along the Saint John River and the Green River. The Green River's official French name is Rivière Verte, from which the village takes name.

== History ==
On 1 January 2023, Rivière-Verte was annexed by the city of Edmundston. The community's name remains in official use.

== Demographics ==
Historical Census Data - Rivière-Verte, New Brunswick
Year	Pop.	±%
1991	988	—
1996	929	−6.0%
2001	856	−7.9%
2006	798	−6.8%
2011	744	−6.8%
2016	724	−2.7%
2021	744	+2.8%

In the 2021 Census of Population conducted by Statistics Canada, Rivière-Verte had a population of 744 living in 359 of its 373 total private dwellings, a change of 2.8% from its 2016 population of 724. With a land area of 6.91 km^{2} (2.67 sq mi), it had a population density of 107.7/km^{2} (278.9/sq mi) in 2021.

Canada census – Rivière-Verte community profile

	2021	2016	2011
Population	744 (+2.8% from 2016)	724 (-2.7% from 2011)	744 (-6.8% from 2006)
Land area	6.91 km^{2} (2.67 sq mi)	6.70 km^{2} (2.59 sq mi)	7.00 km^{2} (2.70 sq mi)
Population density	107.7/km^{2} (279/sq mi)	108.0/km^{2} (280/sq mi)	106.3/km^{2} (275/sq mi)
Median age	50.8 (M: 52, F: 50.4)	50.1 (M: 52.0, F: 48.5)	48.9 (M: 48.4, F: 49.2)
Private dwellings	360 (total)	358 (total)	354 (total)
Median household income		$45,440	$34,297

References: 2021 2016 2011

=== Language ===
Canada Census Mother Tongue - Rivière-Verte, New Brunswick
Census	Total	French			English			French & English			Other		
Year	Responses	Count	Trend	Pop %	Count	Trend	Pop %	Count	Trend	Pop %	Count	Trend	Pop %
2016	710	680		95.8%	25		3.5%	5		0.7%	0	0.0%	0.00%
2011	730	710	▼6.0%	97.26%	20	▼33.3%	2.74%	0	0.0%	0.00%	0	0.0%	0.00%
2006	785	755	▼7.4%	96.18%	30	▲50.0%	3.82%	0	▼100.0%	0.00%	0	0.0%	0.00%
2001	845	815	▼8.9%	96.45%	20	▲33.3%	2.37%	10	0.0%	1.18%	0	0.0%	0.00%
1996	920	895	n/a	97.28%	15	n/a	1.63%	10	n/a	1.09%	0	n/a	0.00%

== See also ==
- List of communities in New Brunswick
- Little Main Restigouche River
