= Rivière-Verte Parish =

Rivière-Verte
- Parish
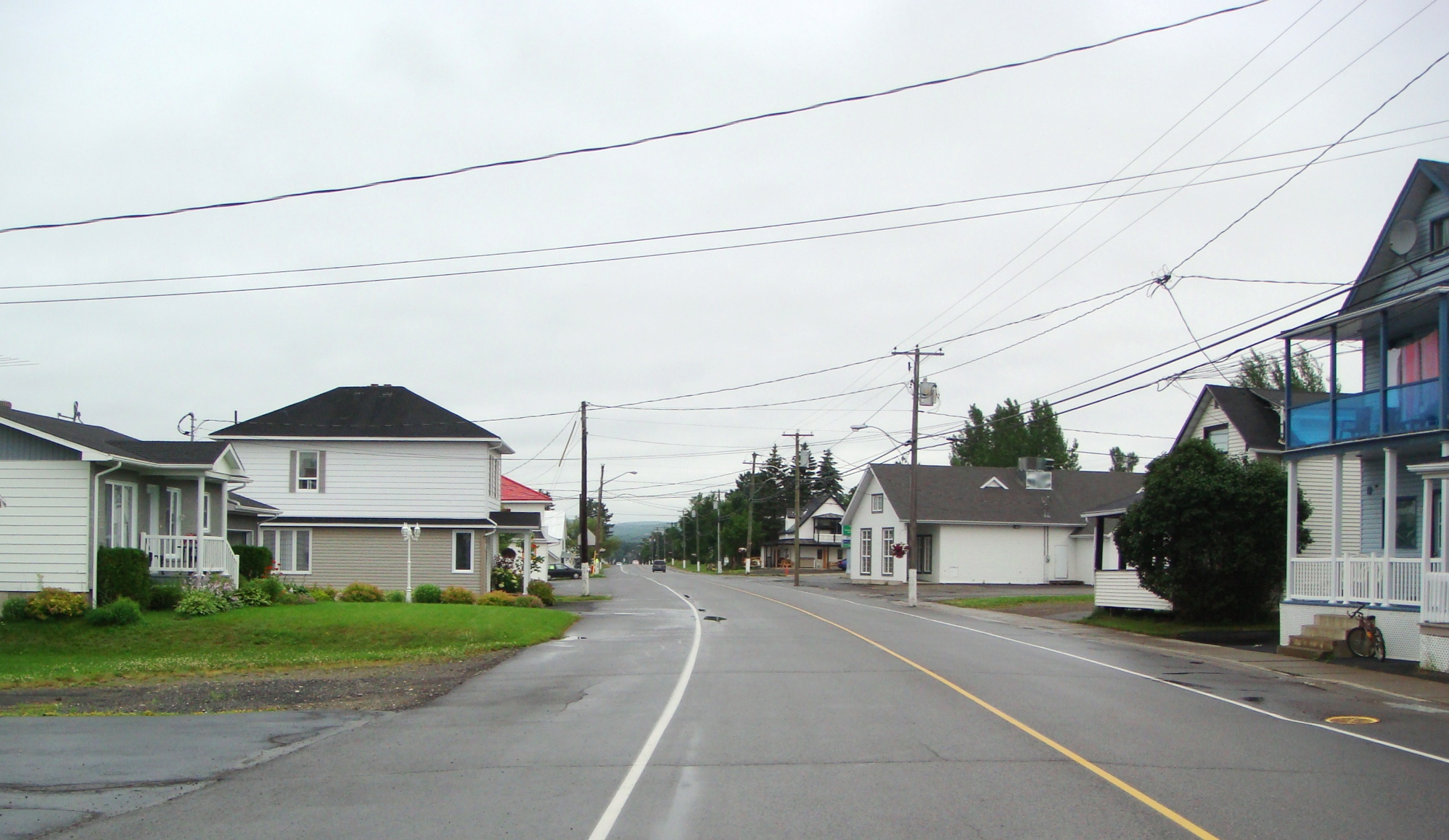
- Rivière-Verte village

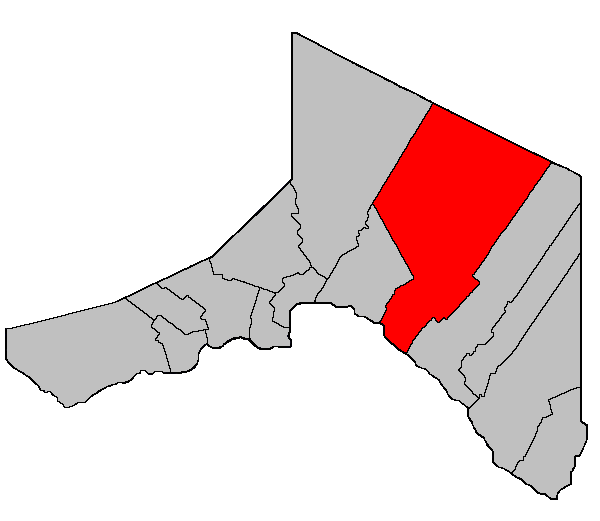
- Location within Madawaska County.
- Coordinates: 47°19′N 68°09′W
- Country: Canada
- Province: New Brunswick
- County: Madawaska
- Erected: 1920

Area
  - Land: 715.72 km^{2} (276.34 sq mi)

Population (2021)
  - Total: 657
  - Density: 0.9/km^{2} (2.3/sq mi)
  - Change 2016-2021: ▼7.6%
  - Dwellings: 324
- Time zone: UTC-4 (AST)
  - Summer (DST): UTC-3 (ADT)
- Figures do not include portion within village of Rivière-Verte

Rivière-Verte (French pronunciation: [ʁivjɛʁ vɛʁt]) is a geographic parish in Madawaska County, New Brunswick, Canada. (Note: The Territorial Division Act divides the province into 152 parishes, the cities of Saint John and Fredericton, and one town of Grand Falls. The Interpretation Act clarifies that parishes include any local government within their borders.)

For governance purposes it is divided between the city of Edmundston, the town of Vallée-des-Rivières, and the Northwest rural district, all of which are members of the Northwest Regional Service Commission.

Before the 2023 governance reforms, the village of Rivière-Verte included what is now part of Edmundston, while the parish outside the village formed the local service district of the parish of Rivière-Verte.

== Origin of name ==
The parish probably takes its name from the Green River, a tributary of the Saint John River, which takes its name from the colour of its water.

== History ==
Rivière-Verte was erected in 1920 from Saint-Basile Parish.

== Boundaries ==
Rivière-Verte Parish is bounded:

- on the northeast, beginning on the Restigouche County line at the prolongation of the northwestern line of a grant to John Hart on the Saint John River, then running southeasterly about 24 kilometres to the northwestern line of the Third Tract granted to the New Brunswick Railway Company;
- on the southeast, beginning on the county line, then running southwesterly along the Third Tract to its westernmost corner, then southeasterly along southwestern line of the Third Tract to the prolongation of the southeastern line of a grant to Louis E. Roy in Tier Nine of the Martin Settlement North, then southwesterly along the prolongation, the Roy grant, and straight along grant lines across Tiers Eight and Seven to Montagne-de-la-Croix Road, then northwesterly along the road about 550 metres to the northernmost corner of a grant to Théodule Clavette in Tier Six of Martin Settlement North, then southwesterly to the southernmost corner of the Clavette grant, then northwesterly about 1.3 kilometres along Tier Six to the prolongation of the southeastern line of Lot I in a five-lot grant to John M. Steeves on the Quisibis River, then southwesterly along Lot I to the Quisibis, then upstream about 50 metres, then southwesterly along the southeastern line of a grant to Amable Thibaudeau, then southwesterly along the Thibaudeau grant to the northernmost corner of a grant to Dennis Bourgoin, then southwesterly, with a bend slightly more southerly, along the Bourgoin grant to the rear line of grants on the Saint John River, then southeasterly about 100 metres to the easternmost corner of a grant to Francis Gaudin, then southwesterly along the Gaudin grant and its prolongation the Saint John;
- on the southwest by international border within the Saint John River;
- on the northwest, beginning in the Saint John on the prolongation of the northwestern line of a grant to John Vassour, about 1.1 kilometres upriver from Lavoie Road, then running northeasterly along the Vassour grant to the rear line of the Saint John River tier, then northwesterly about 475 metres to the westernmost corner of a grant to J. Legasse and Others, then northeasterly along the northwestern line of the Legasse grant to the Green River, (Note: The English name Green River and the French name Rivière Verte are both official.) then across the river and northeasterly along the northwestern line of a grant to Edward Thibaudeau in Tier One north of the Green River to the rear line of Tier One, then northwesterly about 200 metres to the southernmost corner of a Tier Two grant to Thomas Lavoie, then northeasterly in a straight line along the northwestern line of the Lavoie grant and grants in Tiers Three and Four to the rear line of Tier Four, then northwesterly along Tier Four and its prolongation to the prolongation of the Hart grant;
- on the northwest by the prolongation of the Hart grant, beginning about 1.8 kilometres northeast of Green River and running northeasterly to the county line.

== Communities ==
Communities at least partly within the parish. bold indicates an incorporated municipality

- Beardsley Depot
- Davis Mill
- Montagne-de-la-Croix
- Montagne-des-Roy
- Montagne-des-Therrien
- **Rivière-Verte**

== Bodies of water ==
Bodies of water (Note: Not including brooks, ponds or coves.) at least partly in the parish.

- Gounamitz River
- Little Main Restigouche River
- Quisibis River
- Saint John River
- Branche à Charles
- Caribou Branch
- Lake Branch
- Main Branch
- Upper Main Branch
- Charles Fork
- Knox Fork
- Burgess Lake
- North Quisibis Lake

== Other notable places ==
Parks, historic sites, and other noteworthy places at least partly in the parish.

- McCoy Brook Protected Natural Area
- Quisibis Mountain Protected Natural Area
- Quisibis River Protected Natural Area

== Demographics ==
Parish population total does not include village of Rivière-Verte

=== Population ===
Canada census – Rivière-Verte community profile

	2021	2016	2011
Population	657 (-7.6% from 2016)	711 (+3.6% from 2011)	686 (-13.3% from 2006)
Land area	715.72 km^{2} (276.34 sq mi)	715.86 km^{2} (276.40 sq mi)	715.60 km^{2} (276.29 sq mi)
Population density	0.9/km^{2} (2.3/sq mi)	1.0/km^{2} (2.6/sq mi)	1.0/km^{2} (2.6/sq mi)
Median age	50.4 (M: 52, F: 48)	47.1 (M: 48.3, F: 43.9)	45.2 (M: 44.9, F: 45.6)
Private dwellings	305 (total)	346 (total)	325 (total)
Median household income		$47,616	$44,379

References: 2021 2016 2011

Historical Census Data - Rivière-Verte Parish, New Brunswick

Year	Pop.	±%
1991	801	—
1996	853	+6.5%

Year	Pop.	±%
2001	825	−3.3%
2006	791	−4.1%

Year	Pop.	±%
2011	686	−13.3%
2016	711	+3.6%

=== Language ===
Canada Census Mother Tongue - Rivière-Verte Parish, New Brunswick
Census	Total	French			English			French & English			Other		
Year	Responses	Count	Trend	Pop %	Count	Trend	Pop %	Count	Trend	Pop %	Count	Trend	Pop %
2016	705	690		97.9%	10		1.4%	5		0.7%	0	Steady	0%
2011	685	675	▼14.0%	98.54%	10	▼33.3%	1.46%	0	▼100.0%	0.00%	0	0.0%	0.00%
2006	810	785	▼4.3%	96.91%	15	0.0%	1.85%	10	0.0%	1.23%	0	0.0%	0.00%
2001	845	820	▼0.6%	97.04%	15	▼40.0%	1.78%	10	▲ n/a%	1.18%	0	0.0%	0.00%
1996	850	825	n/a	97.06%	25	n/a	2.94%	0	n/a	0.00%	0	n/a	0.00%

== See also ==
- List of parishes in New Brunswick
