= Five Fingers, New Brunswick =

Settlement in New Brunswick, Canada

Coordinates: 47.515°N 67.352°W

Location of Five Fingers in New Brunswick

Five Fingers is a settlement in New Brunswick.

== See also ==
- List of communities in New Brunswick
