= Yvon Poitras =

Canadian politician

- Born: July 13, 1948 (age 77); Grand Falls, New Brunswick, Canada
- Occupations: Businessman, politician, lobbyist
- Political party: Progressive Conservative

Yvon Poitras (born July 13, 1948) is a Canadian businessman, politician and lobbyist. He served as the Minister of Municipal Affairs of New Brunswick for 3 years, as well as Treasury Board chairman for two until 1985 under Premier Richard Hatfield.

Poitras was born in Grand Falls, New Brunswick. He currently is general manager of the New Brunswick Maple Syrup Association.

New Brunswick provincial government of Richard Hatfield
Cabinet post (1)
Predecessor	Office	Successor
'Horace Smith'	'Minister of Municipal Affairs'; 1982–1985	'Robert Jackson'
Legislative Assembly of New Brunswick
Preceded by Alfred Roussel	MLA for Restigouche West; 1982–1987	Succeeded by Jean-Paul Savoie
