= Sugarloaf Mountain (New Brunswick) =

Mountain in New Brunswick, Canada

Coordinates: 47°59′23″N 66°41′08″W

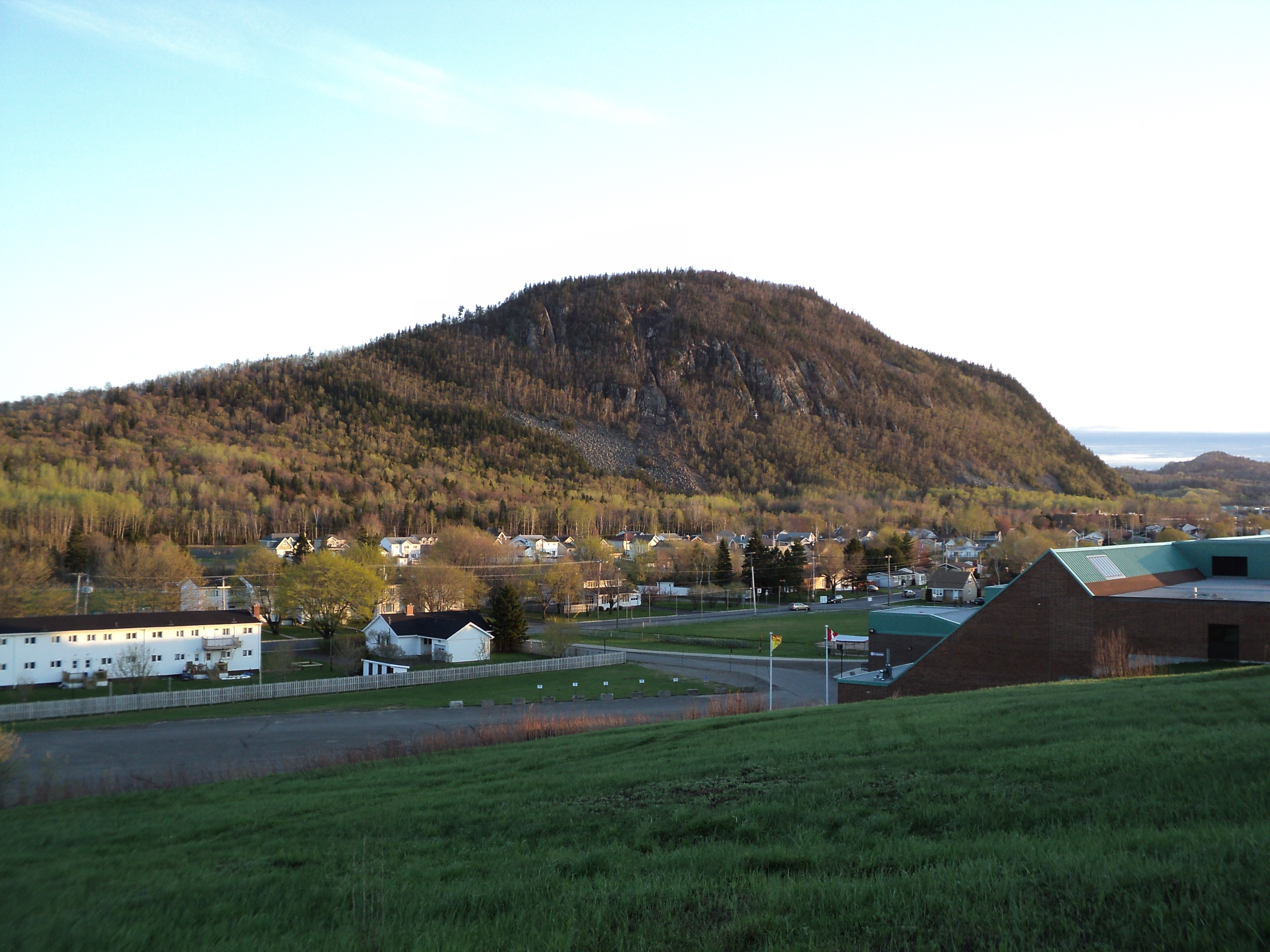
Sugarloaf Mountain, as seen from Campbellton

Sugarloaf Mountain is a 281.1 m (922 ft) mountain in the northern Appalachian Mountains in Campbellton, New Brunswick, Canada. The mountain is protected by Sugarloaf Provincial Park and lies within city limits, just south of the urban area.

== Visitor attractions ==
Sugarloaf Mountain lies within the 11.5 km^{2} (4.4 sq mi) Sugarloaf Provincial Park. Sugarloaf Mountain is encircled by a perimeter road which is closed to motor vehicles and is available for walking, jogging and running during the spring, summer and fall seasons. During the winter season, this perimeter road is groomed for cross country skiing. The summit of Sugarloaf Mountain itself is accessible from a hiking trail that climbs its eastern slope; this trail is closed during the winter season and is suitable for those with intermediate hiking experience. At the summit, a viewing platform provides hikers with a vista of the Restigouche River valley including the City of Campbellton, village of Atholville as well as other rural communities in New Brunswick and Quebec.

Sugarloaf Provincial Park has an alpine ski resort on another mountain ridge that is adjacent to but separate from Sugarloaf Mountain. During the winter months, the alpine ski resort offers a variety of alpine skiing for all enthusiasts ranging from beginner to expert, as well as other winter activities such as snowshoeing, cross country skiing, ice skating, snowmobiling, and sleigh rides. During the summer months, the resort still operates its ski lift so that park visitors may ride it to take in vistas of the river valley. The alpine ski hill also offers a downhill mountain bike park.

== Geology ==
Sugarloaf Mountain is a Late Devonian age volcano. Its formation is associated to a period of crustal thinning that followed the Acadian orogeny in the northern Appalachian Mountains. Its rock is felsic.

== History ==
=== Mi'kmaq legend ===
A Mi'kmaq legend states that Sugarloaf Mountain was created when Glooscap flung the leader of a group of giant beavers that had dammed the Restigouche River, blocking the salmon from their spawning grounds and depriving the Mi'kmaq of their food source. The beaver landed at the mountain's site and turned into rock, becoming Sugarloaf Mountain.

=== 1924 tragedy ===
On November 9, 1924 two young women fell to their deaths on the steep almost vertical north slope of Sugarloaf Mountain facing the City of Campbellton. The two women, Mrs. Edmund MacLean (age 19) and Miss Lottie Ramsay (age 17), were sisters and had reportedly left their homes at approximately 4p.m. when they apparently decided to hike the mountain during a light snowfall. A search began later that evening when they had not returned to their homes. The following morning, searchers followed the footprints of the two women in the snow to the summit of the mountain and discovered that they ended near the cliff. Their disfigured bodies were discovered below the cliff, approximately 600–700 feet from the summit. Two crosses (white on red background) have been painted on the north slope of Sugarloaf Mountain near where the bodies of the two women were discovered as a continuous memorial to the only known deaths on this mountain.

== See also ==
- Volcanism of Canada
- Volcanism of Eastern Canada
- List of volcanoes in Canada
- Mount Pleasant Caldera
