= Sugarloaf Provincial Park =

Provincial Park in Campbellton, New Brunswick, Canada

- Parc provincial Sugarloaf
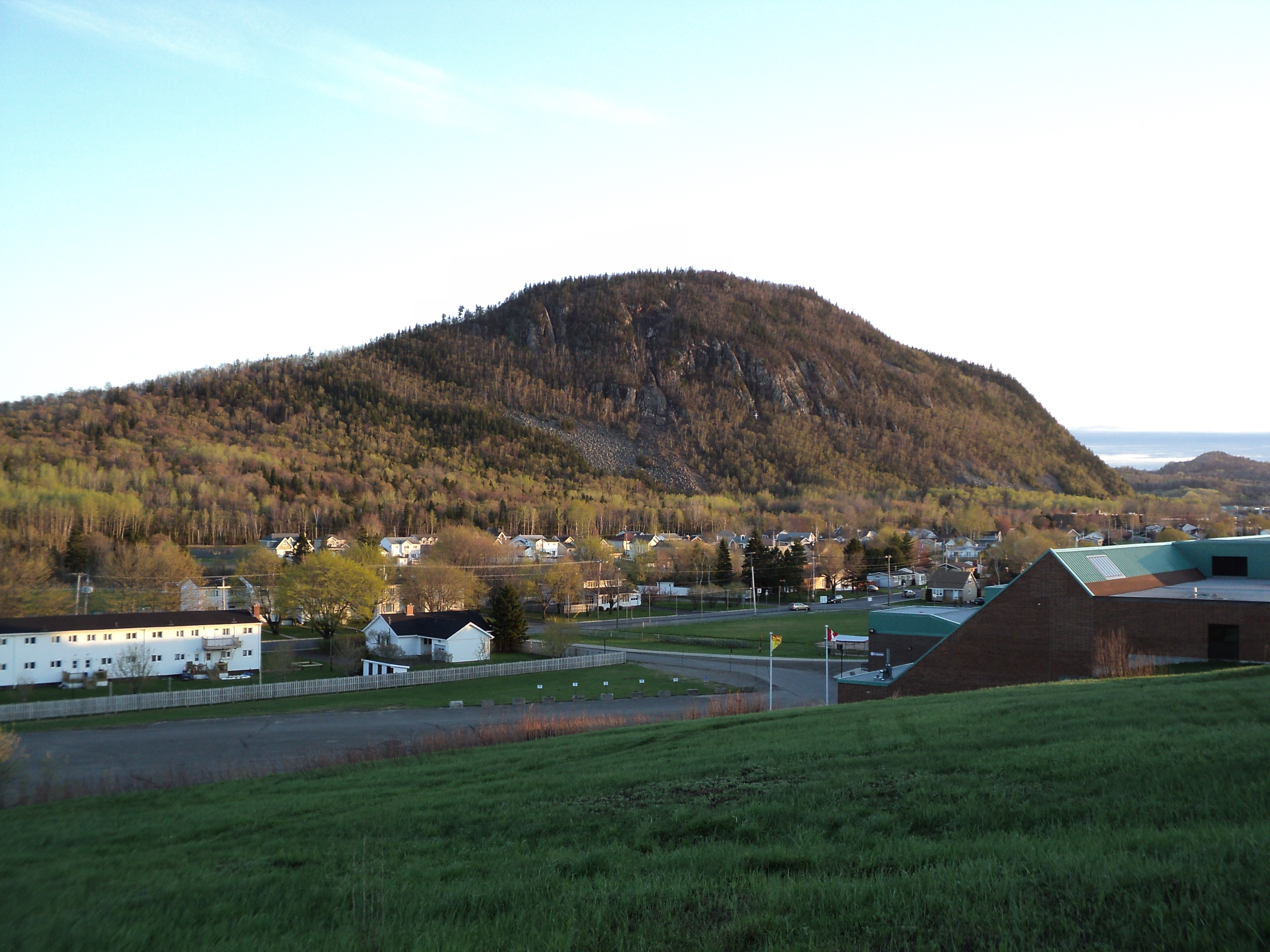
- Sugarloaf Mountain is located within the park

- Location within New Brunswick
- Interactive map of Sugarloaf Provincial Park
- Location: Campbellton, New Brunswick, Canada
- Coordinates: 47°58′36″N 66°40′22″W
- Area: 11 square kilometres (4.2 sq mi)
- Established: 1972
- Governing body: Government of New Brunswick
- Website: parcsugarloafpark.ca

Sugarloaf Provincial Park is an 11.5-square-kilometre (4.4 sq mi) all-season provincial park located in the Campbellton community of Atholville. It opened in 1972.

== Geography ==
The park includes Sugarloaf Mountain, an extinct late Devonian volcano. The majority of the park is undeveloped and forested; in addition to the stand-alone Sugarloaf Mountain, it includes the north slope of an unnamed ridge of the Appalachian Mountains, as well as two named lakes (Prichard Lake, and Smith lake), as well as a drinking water reservoir for the City of Campbellton. The park's watershed drains into Walker Brook.

The park measures approximately 4 km (2.5 mi) north to south, and 3 km (1.9 mi) east to west. It is bordered on the north by Route 11, on the east by Lily Lake Rd, on the south by Lac-des-Lys Rd, and on the west by Val d'Amour Rd.

== Trails ==
Sugarloaf Mountain is encircled by a perimeter road which is closed to motor vehicles and is available for walking, jogging and running during the spring, summer and fall seasons. During the winter season, this perimeter road is groomed for cross country skiing. The summit of Sugarloaf Mountain itself is accessible from a hiking trail that climbs its eastern slope; this trail is closed during the winter season and is suitable for those with intermediate hiking experience.

The unnamed ridge south of Sugarloaf Mountain has a variety of trails extending to and around the lakes as well as through the alpine ski slope. A total of 32 km (20 mi) of groomed trails for snowmobiling and cross country skiing are available. The park experiences, on average, 300 to 400 cm of snow each year.

== Alpine ski resort ==
Sugarloaf Provincial Park has an alpine ski resort on the unnamed mountain ridge that is adjacent to but separate from Sugarloaf Mountain. During the winter months, the alpine ski resort offers a variety of alpine skiing for all enthusiasts ranging from beginner to expert, as well as other winter activities such as snowshoeing, cross country skiing, ice skating, snowmobiling, and sleigh rides.

During the summer months, the resort still operates its ski lift so that park visitors may ride it to take in vistas of the Restigouche River valley. The alpine ski hill also offers a downhill mountain bike park and used to have an alpine slide. which was removed in 2009.

== Gallery ==
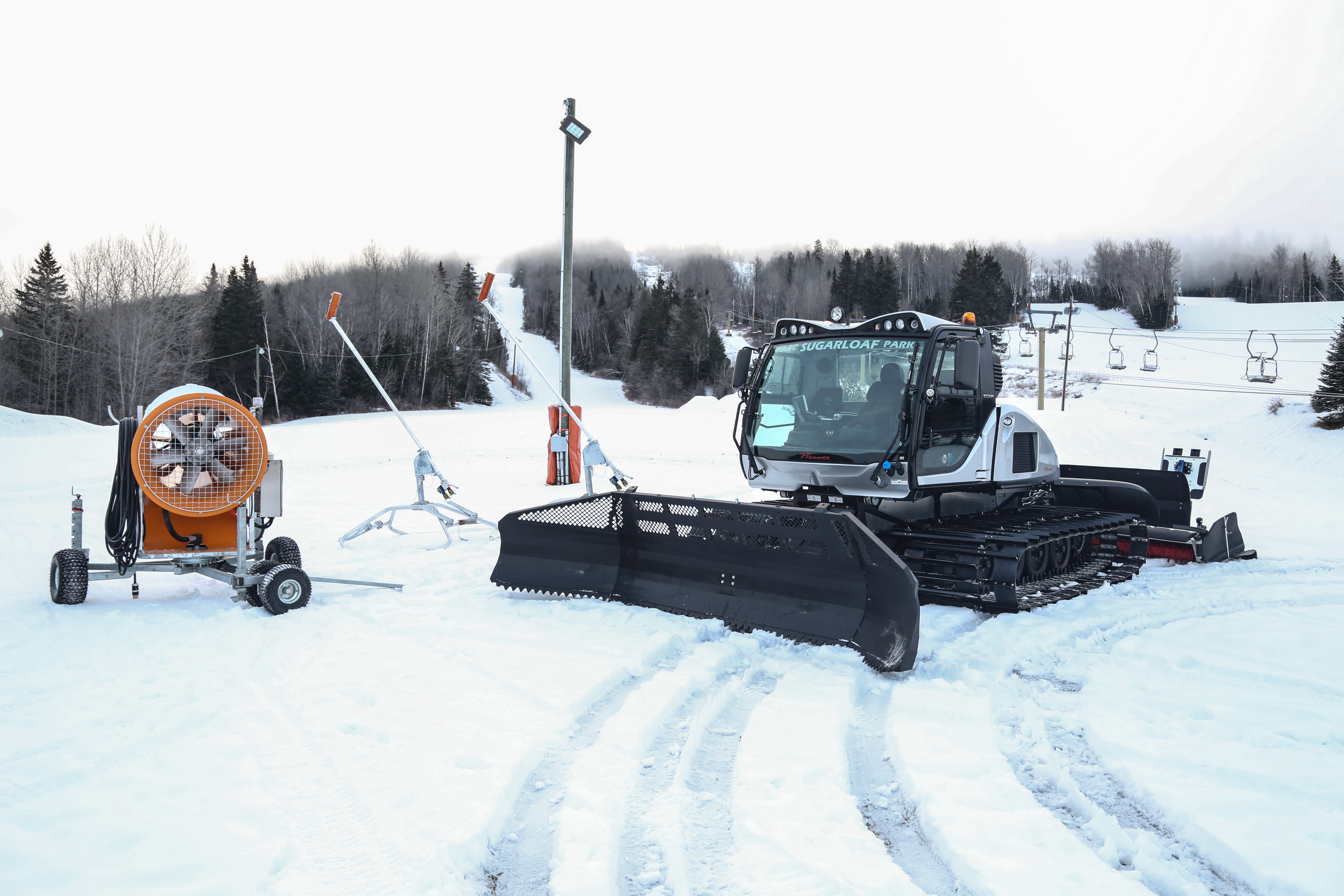
Sugarloaf Provincial Park machinery
