= Alfred Roussel =

Canadian politician

J. Alfred Roussel

MLA for Restigouche West
- In office 1970–1982
- Succeeded by: Yvon Poitras

Personal details
- Born: January 21, 1921 Tradacie, New Brunswick
- Died: November 8, 2015 (aged 94) Saint-Quentin, New Brunswick
- Party: New Brunswick Liberal Association

Joseph Alfred Roussel (January 12, 1921 – November 8, 2015) was a Canadian politician. He served in the Legislative Assembly of New Brunswick from 1974 to 1982, as a Liberal member for the constituency of Restigouche West. In 2007, he was awarded the Ordre de la Pléiade.
