= Jean-Paul Savoie =

Canadian politician (1947–2023)

Jean-Paul Savoie (February 9, 1947 – May 11, 2023) was a Canadian social worker and politician in New Brunswick, who represented Restigouche West in the Legislative Assembly of New Brunswick as a Liberal member from 1987 to 1999. He was defeated by Benoît Cyr when he ran for reelection in 1999.

Savoie was born in Kedgwick, New Brunswick. In 1995, he was named Minister of State responsible for Regional Development Corporation and Northern Development. Savoie was mayor of Kedgwick, having been elected in 2001, 2004 and 2008.

Savoie died on May 11, 2023, at the age of 76.

== Sources ==
- Entry from Canadian Who's Who
