= Martine Coulombe =

Canadian politician

Member of the New Brunswick Legislative Assembly for Restigouche-La-Vallée
- In office October 12, 2010 – September 22, 2014
- Preceded by: Burt Paulin
- Succeeded by: Gilles LePage

New Brunswick Minister of Post-Secondary Education, Training and Labour
- In office October 12, 2010 – October 7, 2014
- Preceded by: Donald Arseneault

Personal details
- Political party: Progressive Conservative

Martine Coulombe is a Canadian politician, who was elected to the Legislative Assembly of New Brunswick in the 2010 provincial election. She represented the electoral district of Restigouche-La-Vallée as a member of the Progressive Conservatives until the 2014 election, when she was defeated by Gilles LePage in the redistributed riding of Restigouche West.

She is the sister of federal Member of Parliament Bernard Valcourt.
