= Benoît Cyr =

Canadian politician, pilot, and entrepreneur

Benoit Cyr (born June 14, 1948) is a pilot, entrepreneur and former political figure in New Brunswick, Canada. He represented Restigouche West in the Legislative Assembly of New Brunswick as a Progressive Conservative member from 1999 to 2003.

He was born in Saint-Quentin, New Brunswick, the son of Wilfrid Cyr and Berthe Lévesque. Cyr was educated in Saint-Quentin and at the New Brunswick Technical Institute in Moncton. He was owner and manager of Cyr Aviation.
