= Restigouche West =

Provincial electoral district in New Brunswick, Canada

Restigouche West (2014–present)
New Brunswick electoral district
- The riding of Restigouche West in relation to other New Brunswick electoral districts

Provincial electoral district
- Legislature: Legislative Assembly of New Brunswick
MLA
Gilles LePage
Liberal
- District created: 2013
- First contested: 2024

Demographics
- Population (2011): 14,705
- Electors (2013): 11,764
- Census division: Restigouche

Restigouche West (1974–2006)
New Brunswick electoral district

Defunct provincial electoral district
- Legislature: Legislative Assembly of New Brunswick
- District created: 1973
- District abolished: 2006
- First contested: 1974
- Last contested: 2003

Demographics
- Electors (2003): 8,158
- Census division: Restigouche

Restigouche West (French: Restigouche-Ouest) is a provincial electoral district for the Legislative Assembly of New Brunswick, Canada. It was used from 1974 through 2003, when it was split between the ridings of Restigouche-La-Vallée and Campbellton-Restigouche Centre. The riding was re-established in the 2013 electoral redistribution from parts of Dalhousie-Restigouche East, Restigouche-La-Vallée and Campbellton-Restigouche Centre and will be contested again beginning in the 2014 general election.

This riding was created in the 1973 redistribution when New Brunswick moved to single member districts from Bloc voting. Prior to its creation, it had been part of the Restigouche County district which returned three members. The riding, which was not changed in the 1994 redistribution, was made up of the part of Restigouche County that lies west of the Campbellton area. It included two incorporated municipalities: Saint-Quentin and Kedgwick.

It was merged with Madawaska-la-Vallée to form the new district of Restigouche-la-Vallée in the 2006 redistribution.

Following the 2013 electoral redistribution it was re-established, though its territory now stretches much further east into Restigouche County, and now includes all of Restigouche County except for the Campbellton-Dalhousie area and the town of Belledune.

In the 1987 election, when the New Brunswick Liberal Party won every seat, this was the closest contest. The riding was won by a margin of 17 votes.

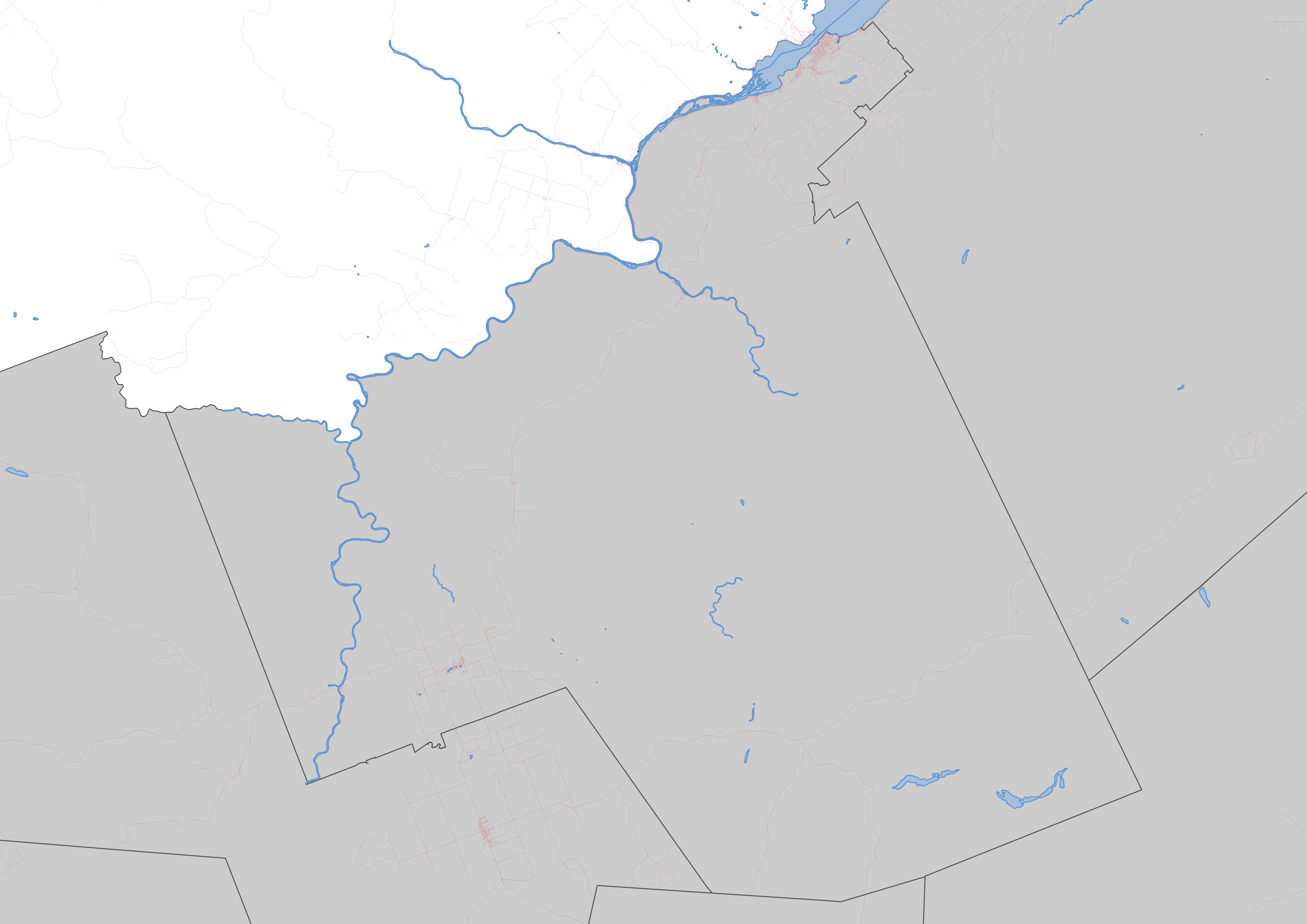
Restigouche West (as it exists from 2023) and the roads in the riding

== Members of the Legislative Assembly ==
Assembly	Years	Member	Party
Riding created from Restigouche
48th	1974–1978	Alfred Roussel	Liberal
49th	1978–1982	Alfred Roussel	Liberal
50th	1982–1987	Yvon Poitras	Progressive Conservative
51st	1987–1991	Jean-Paul Savoie	Liberal
52nd	1991–1995	Jean-Paul Savoie	Liberal
53rd	1995–1999	Jean-Paul Savoie	Liberal
54th	1999–2003	Benoît Cyr	Progressive Conservative
55th	2003–2006	Burt Paulin	Liberal
Riding dissolved into Restigouche-La-Vallée, Campbellton and Dalhousie-Restigouche East
Riding re-created from Restigouche-La-Vallée, Campbellton-Restigouche Centre and Dalhousie-Restigouche East
58th	2014–2018	Gilles LePage	Liberal
59th	2018–2020	Gilles LePage	Liberal
60th	2020–2024	Gilles LePage	Liberal
61st	2024–Present	Gilles LePage	Liberal

== Election results ==
=== 2014–present ===
2024 New Brunswick general election
Party	Candidate	Votes	%	±%
Liberal	Gilles LePage	3,993	64.2%	+2.05
Progressive Conservative	Diane Cyr	1,733	27.9%	+12.47
Green	Myriam Cormier	380	6.1%	-15.62
Libertarian	Ronald Geraghty	116	1.9%	
Total valid votes		6,222		
Total rejected ballots				
Turnout				
Eligible voters				
Liberal hold		Swing		
Source: Elections New Brunswick

2020 New Brunswick general election
Party	Candidate	Votes	%	±%
Liberal	Gilles LePage	5,022	62.15	+9.62
Green	Charles Thériault	1,755	21.72	-9.80
Progressive Conservative	Louis Bérubé	1,247	15.43	+3.51
KISS	Travis Pollock	56	0.69	-0.08
Total valid votes		8,080	100.00	
Total rejected ballots		46	0.57	
Turnout		8,126	71.03	+1.67
Eligible voters		11,440		
Source: Elections New Brunswick

2018 New Brunswick general election
Party	Candidate	Votes	%	±%
Liberal	Gilles LePage	4,233	52.53	-5.49
Green	Charles Thériault	2,540	31.52	--*
Progressive Conservative	David Moreau	961	11.92	-8.16
New Democratic	Beverly A. Mann	263	3.26	-0.86
KISS	Travis Pollock	62	0.77	
Total valid votes		8,059	100.00	
Total rejected ballots		64	0.79	
Turnout		8,123	69.36	
Eligible voters		11,711		
Source: Elections New Brunswick
*Charles Thériault's vote share change compared to his run as an independent candidate in 2014 was +13.74%.

2014 New Brunswick general election
Party	Candidate	Votes	%
Liberal	Gilles LePage	4,940	58.02
Progressive Conservative	Martine Coulombe	1,710	20.08
Independent	Charles Thériault	1,514	17.78
New Democratic	Gilles Cyr	351	4.12
Total valid votes		8,515	100.0
Total rejected ballots		70	0.82
Turnout		8,585	73.00
Eligible voters		11,761	
This riding was created from parts of Restigouche-La-Vallée, Campbellton-Restigouche Centre and Dalhousie-Restigouche East, which elected two Progressive Conservatives and one Liberal (Dalhousie-Restigouche East). Martine Coulombe was the incumbent from Restigouche-La-Vallée.
Source: Elections New Brunswick

=== 1974–2003 ===
2003 New Brunswick general election
Party	Candidate	Votes	%	±%
Liberal	Burt W. Paulin	4,008	59.04	+12.66
Progressive Conservative	Ben Cyr	2,523	37.17	-12.89
New Democratic	Antoine Duguay	257	3.79	+0.24
Total valid votes		6,788	100.0	
Liberal gain from Progressive Conservative		Swing		+12.78

1999 New Brunswick general election
Party	Candidate	Votes	%	±%
Progressive Conservative	Ben Cyr	3,592	50.06	+5.56
Liberal	Jean-Paul Savoie	3,328	46.38	-5.08
New Democratic	Rose Duguay	255	3.55	+0.79
Total valid votes		7,175	100.0	
Progressive Conservative gain from Liberal		Swing		+5.32

1995 New Brunswick general election
Party	Candidate	Votes	%	±%
Liberal	Jean-Paul Savoie	3,735	51.46	-2.52
Progressive Conservative	Luc LeBrun	3,230	44.50	+9.76
New Democratic	Wendy Martin	200	2.76	-1.40
Natural Law	Marcelle Lamontagne	93	1.28	–
Total valid votes		7,258	100.0	
Liberal hold		Swing		-6.14

1991 New Brunswick general election
Party	Candidate	Votes	%	±%
Liberal	Jean-Paul Savoie	3,922	53.98	+5.68
Progressive Conservative	Félix J. Dubé	2,524	34.74	-13.32
Confederation of Regions	Robert A. Boudreau	517	7.12	–
New Democratic	Rino Pelletier	302	4.16	+0.52
Total valid votes		7,265	100.0	
Liberal hold		Swing		+9.50

1987 New Brunswick general election
Party	Candidate	Votes	%	±%
Liberal	Jean-Paul Savoie	3,479	48.30	+8.66
Progressive Conservative	Yvon Poitras	3,462	48.06	+5.38
New Democratic	James Gallant	262	3.64	–
Total valid votes		7,203	100.0	
Liberal gain from Progressive Conservative		Swing		+1.64

1982 New Brunswick general election
Party	Candidate	Votes	%	±%
Progressive Conservative	Yvon Poitras	2,885	42.68	+15.29
Liberal	Alfred J. Roussel	2,680	39.64	+1.85
Parti acadien	Armand Ploudre	1,195	17.68	-17.14
Total valid votes		6,760	100.0	
Progressive Conservative gain from Liberal		Swing		+6.72

1978 New Brunswick general election
Party	Candidate	Votes	%	±%
Liberal	Alfred Roussel	2,174	37.79	-15.15
Parti acadien	Armand Plourde	2,003	34.82	-7.52
Progressive Conservative	Jean Guy Raymond	1,576	27.39	-14.95
Total valid votes		5,753	100.0	
Liberal hold		Swing		-3.82

1974 New Brunswick general election
Party	Candidate	Votes	%
Liberal	Alfred Roussel	2,503	52.94
Progressive Conservative	Reginald Cyr	2,002	42.34
New Democratic	John Cyr	223	4.72
Total valid votes		4,728	100.0
The previous multi-member riding of Restigouche went totally Liberal in the previous election, with Alfred Roussel being one of three incumbents.

== See also ==
- List of New Brunswick provincial electoral districts
- Canadian provincial electoral districts
