= Samuel Lee (judge) =

Canadian politician

Samuel Lee (March 28, 1756 – March 3, 1805) was a businessman, judge and politician in New Brunswick. He represented Northumberland County in the New Brunswick Legislative Assembly from 1795 to 1802.

He was born in Concord, Massachusetts, the son of Doctor Joseph Lee. Lee was educated at Harvard College and became a merchant in Penobscot (later Castine, Maine). As a loyalist, he settled in Restigouche, New Brunswick in 1784 and acquired land along the Restigouche River. Lee became involved in the trade in fish and timber. In 1787, he was named a justice of the peace and, two years later, a judge for the Inferior Court of Common Pleas. Lee was defeated when he ran for reelection in 1802. He died at Shediac at the age of 48.
