= Zenabis =

Canadian cannabis producer

Zenabis Global Inc.
- Traded as: TSX: ZENA
- Industry: Cannabis
- Predecessor: International Herbs Medical Marijuana Ltd
- Founded: 2014
- Founders: Monty Sikka, Mark Catroppa
- Fate: Acquired by HEXO Corp.
- Area served: Global
- Products: Zenabis (medical marijuana); Namaste (recreational marijuana); Blazery (recreational marijuana); Re-Up (recreational marijuana)
- Website: zenabis.com

Zenabis Global Inc. was a Canadian medical and recreational marijuana producer.

== History ==
Zenabis is originally known by the name International Herbs Medical Marijuana Ltd. and was co-founded by Monty Sikka and Mark Catroppa. It purchased its first facility in 2014 in New Brunswick and received a cultivation license from Health Canada in 2017. Zenabis received its sales license for dried marijuana from Health Canada in 2018, and received its license to sell cannabis oil in March 2019. In January 2019, Zenabis's parent company Sun Pharm completed a reverse take-over of Bevo Agro Inc., leading to the two firms operating under the banner of Zenabis Global Inc. The company was traded on the TSX under the ticker symbol ZENA.

Like all medical marijuana companies in Canada, Zenabis has struggled on the stock market. The company was acquired by HEXO Corp in 2021 in an all-stock deal.
