= Val-d'Amour, New Brunswick =

Val-d'Amour
- Unincorporated community
- Location within New Brunswick.
- Coordinates: 47.95°N 66.68°W
- Country: Canada
- Province: New Brunswick
- County: Restigouche
- Parish: Addington
- Electoral Districts Federal: Madawaska—Restigouche
- Provincial: Campbellton-Restigouche Centre

Government
  - Type: Local service district
- Time zone: UTC-4 (AST)
  - Summer (DST): UTC-3 (ADT)
- Postal code(s): E3N
- Area code: 506
- Highways: None

Val-d'Amour is an unincorporated community in Restigouche County, New Brunswick, Canada.

The former local service district of Val D'Amours took its name from the community, although the spelling was altered.

== See also ==
- List of communities in New Brunswick
