= Gilles LePage =

Canadian politician

Gilles LePage MLA

Minister of Environment and Climate Change
- Incumbent
- Assumed office November 2, 2024
- Premier: Susan Holt
- Preceded by: Gary Crossman

Minister responsible for the Regional Development Corporation
- Incumbent
- Assumed office November 2, 2024
- Premier: Susan Holt
- Preceded by: Réjean Savoie

Minister of Tourism, Heritage, and Culture
- In office October 5, 2018 – November 8, 2018
- Premier: Brian Gallant
- Preceded by: John Ames
- Succeeded by: Robert Gauvin

Minister of Labour, Employment, and Population Growth
- In office September 5, 2017 – November 8, 2018
- Premier: Brian Gallant
- Preceded by: Donald Arseneault

Member of the New Brunswick Legislative Assembly for Restigouche West
- Incumbent
- Assumed office September 22, 2014

Personal details
- Party: Liberal

Gilles LePage is a Canadian politician, who was elected to the Legislative Assembly of New Brunswick in the 2014 provincial election. He represents the electoral district of Restigouche West as a member of the Liberal Party.

LePage was named Vice Chairman of the Select Committee on Cannabis, pursuant to Motion 31 of the 3rd session of the 58th New Brunswick Legislature. He was a Minister in the Gallant administration.

On September 24, 2018, LePage was voted in again to be the MLA for the riding of Restigouche West. He was re-elected in the 2020 provincial election.

As of September 8, 2024, he serves as the Official Opposition critic for Economic Development and Opportunities New Brunswick, for Small Business and Trade Policy, and for Population Growth and Immigration.

LePage was re-elected in the 2024 general election. On November 1, 2024, it was announced that he was placed on the cabinet as Minister of Environment and Climate Change and Minister responsible for the Regional Development Corporation.

== Electoral record ==
=== Restigouche West ===
2024 New Brunswick general election: Restigouche West
Party	Candidate	Votes	%	±%
Liberal	Gilles LePage	3,993	64.2%	+2.05
Progressive Conservative	Diane Cyr	1,733	27.9%	+12.47
Green	Myriam Cormier	380	6.1%	-15.62
Libertarian	Ronald Geraghty	116	1.9%	
Total valid votes		6,222		
Total rejected ballots				
Turnout				
Eligible voters				
Liberal hold		Swing		
Source: Elections New Brunswick

2020 New Brunswick general election
Party	Candidate	Votes	%	±%
Liberal	Gilles LePage	5,022	62.15	+9.62
Green	Charles Thériault	1,755	21.72	-9.80
Progressive Conservative	Louis Bérubé	1,247	15.43	+3.51
KISS	Travis Pollock	56	0.69	-0.08
Total valid votes		8,080	100.00	
Total rejected ballots		46	0.57	
Turnout		8,126	71.03	+1.67
Eligible voters		11,440		
Source: Elections New Brunswick

2018 New Brunswick general election
Party	Candidate	Votes	%	±%
Liberal	Gilles LePage	4,233	52.53	-5.49
Green	Charles Thériault	2,540	31.52	
Progressive Conservative	David Moreau	961	11.92	-8.16
New Democratic	Beverly A. Mann	263	3.26	-0.86
KISS	Travis Pollock	62	0.77	
Total valid votes		8,059	100.00	
Total rejected ballots		64	0.79	
Turnout		8,123	69.36	
Eligible voters		11,711		
Source: Elections New Brunswick

2014 New Brunswick general election
Party	Candidate	Votes	%
Liberal	Gilles LePage	4,940	58.02
Progressive Conservative	Martine Coulombe	1,710	20.08
Independent	Charles Thériault	1,514	17.78
New Democratic	Gilles Cyr	351	4.12
Total valid votes		8,515	100.0
Total rejected ballots		70	0.82
Turnout		8,585	73.00
Eligible voters		11,761	
This riding (Restigouche West) was created from parts of Restigouche-La-Vallée, Campbellton-Restigouche Centre and Dalhousie-Restigouche East, which elected two Progressive Conservatives and one Liberal (Dalhousie-Restigouche East). Martine Coulombe was the incumbent from Restigouche-La-Vallée.
Source: Elections New Brunswick
