= Balmoral Parish, New Brunswick =

Balmoral
- Parish
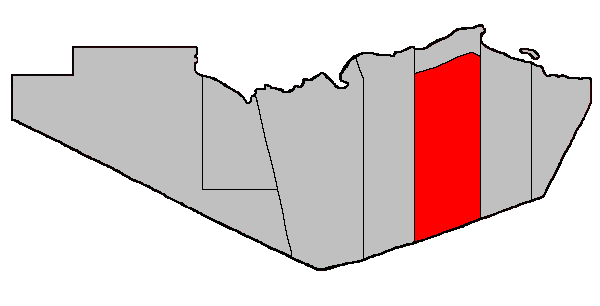
- Location within Restigouche County.
- Coordinates: 47.6975°N 66.5575°W
- Country: Canada
- Province: New Brunswick
- County: Restigouche
- Erected: 1896

Area
  - Land: 1,088.01 km^{2} (420.08 sq mi)

Population (2021)
  - Total: 309
  - Density: 0.3/km^{2} (0.78/sq mi)
  - Change 2016-2021: ▲11.2%
  - Dwellings: 131
- Time zone: UTC-4 (AST)
  - Summer (DST): UTC-3 (ADT)
- Figures do not include the villages of Atholville, Balmoral, Charlo, and Eel River Crossing

Balmoral is a geographic parish in Restigouche County, New Brunswick, Canada. (Note: The Territorial Division Act divides the province into 152 parishes, the cities of Saint John and Fredericton, and one town of Grand Falls. The Interpretation Act clarifies that parishes include any local government within their borders.)

For governance purposes it is divided between the city of Campbellton, the town of Heron Bay, the village of Bois-Joli, the Moose Meadows 4 Indian reserve, and the Restigouche rural district, all of which are members of the Restigouche Regional Service Commission.

Before the 2023 governance reform, along Route 275 beginning near the eastern parish line and running southwest to the western parish line were the village of Balmoral, the local service district of Blair Athol, and the village of Atholville, with the LSD of Balmoral-St. Maure along the southern boundary of Balmoral; small areas in the northeastern corner were part of the villages of Eel River Crossing and Charlo, and the remainder of the parish formed the LSD of the parish of Balmoral, often called Balmoral-Maltais to distinguish it from Balmoral-St. Maure. The reform amalgamated Balmoral, Balmoral-St. Maure, Blair Athol, and parts of the parish LSD along the Boissonault, Drapeau and Saint-Maure Roads with Eel River Crossing and areas neighbouring it to form Bois-Joli; Campbellton annexed part of the parish LSD along the southern side of McAbbie Road, Heron Bay annexed two areas of the parish LSD along the eastern parish line, and the remainder of the parish LSD became part of the rural district.

== Origin of name ==
The parish may have gotten its name from Balmoral Castle, Scotland, increasingly used by Queen Victoria at the time. William F. Ganong had no idea of its origin, noting only that there was a place of that name in Scotland.

== History ==
Balmoral was erected in 1896 from Dalhousie Parish.

== Boundaries ==
Balmoral Parish is bounded:

- on the northwest and north by a line beginning at a point about 350 metres north of Route 275 and about 900 metres westerly of the junction of Val-d'Amour Road with Route 275, then running northeasterly along the northwestern edge of the Balmoral Settlement to its northeastern corner, then turning 90º and running about 250 metres southeasterly, then turning 90º and running to Route 275, then running easterly along the southern edge of grants along Route 280 then those along Route 11 to meet a line running true south from near the northern end of the Eel River Bar Seawall;
- on the east by the line running due south from the Eel River Bar Seawall to the Northumberland County line;
- on the south by the county line;
- on the west by a line beginning on the county line about 2.9 kilometres west of the Lower West Branch Portage Brook, then running true north to the starting point.

== Communities ==
Communities at least partly within the parish. bold indicates an incorporated municipality or Indian reserve

- **Atholville**
- **Balmoral**
  - Selwood
  - Upper Balmoral
- Blair Athol
- **Charlo**
- **Eel River Crossing**
- Macabee (Brassard) (Note: Natural Resources Canada lists Macabee as the current name; provincial highway mapbooks use Brassard.)
- Maltais (partly in Balmoral)
- **Moose Meadows 4**
- Ramsay Sheds
- Saint-Maure (partly in Balmoral)
- Simpsons Field

== Bodies of water ==
Bodies of water (Note: Not including brooks, ponds or coves.) at least partly within the parish.

- Charlo River
- Eel River
- Jacquet River
- Little Southeast Upsalquitch River
- Popelogan River
- Popelogan Lake Branch River
- South Charlo River
- Southeast Upsalquitch River
- more than twenty officially named lakes

== Other notable places ==
Parks, historic sites, and other noteworthy places at least partly within the parish.

- Budworm City airstrip
- Goulette Brook Protected Natural Area
- Mount Akroyd Protected Natural Area
- Portage Lakes Protected Natural Area
- White Meadows

== Demographics ==
Parish population total did not include portions within Moose Meadows 4 or former municipalities. Revised census figures based on the 2023 local governance reforms have not been released.

=== Population ===
Canada census – Balmoral community profile

	2021	2016	2011
Population	309 (+11.2% from 2016)	278 (+6.9% from 2011)	602 (-2.7% from 2006)
Land area	1,088.01 km^{2} (420.08 sq mi)	1,089.41 km^{2} (420.62 sq mi)	1,098.32 km^{2} (424.06 sq mi)
Population density	0.3/km^{2} (0.78/sq mi)	0.3/km^{2} (0.78/sq mi)	0.5/km^{2} (1.3/sq mi)
Median age	46.0 (M: 46.4, F: 46.0)	45.8 (M: 47.2, F: 45.5)	44.5 (M: 45.1, F: 42.6)
Private dwellings	131 (total) 121 (occupied)	120 (total)	251 (total)
Median household income	$73,500	$58,880	$34,474

Notes: 2016 population change is in comparison to revised 2011 population
References: 2021 2016 2011

Historical Census Data - Balmoral Parish, New Brunswick

Year	Pop.	±%
1991	748	—
1996	780	+4.3%
2001	605	−22.4%

Year	Pop.	±%
2006	619	+2.3%
2011	602	−2.7%
2011 rev	260	−56.8%

Year	Pop.	±%
2016	278	+6.9%
2021	309	+11.2%

2011 rev shows population after boundary changes

=== Language ===
Canada Census Mother Tongue - Balmoral Parish, New Brunswick
Census	Total	French			English			French & English			Other		
Year	Responses	Count	Trend	Pop %	Count	Trend	Pop %	Count	Trend	Pop %	Count	Trend	Pop %
2021	305	260	▲8.3%	85.2%	50	▲42.9%	16.4%	5	▲500.0%	1.64%	0	▼100.0%	0.00%
2016	280	240	▼57.9%	85.7%	35	▲16.7%	12.5%	0	▼100.0%	0%	5	▲500.0%	1.8%
2011	605	570	▲0.9%	94.21%	30	▼25.0%	4.96%	5	▼50.0%	0.83%	0	0.0%	0.00%
2006	615	565	▲4.6%	91.87%	40	▲60.0%	6.50%	10	▼60.0%	1.63%	0	0.0%	0.00%
2001	575	540	▼30.3%	93.91%	25	▲25.0%	4.35%	10	0.0%	1.74%	0	0.0%	0.00%
1996	805	775	n/a	96.27%	20	n/a	2.48%	10	n/a	1.24%	0	n/a	0.00%

== Access Routes ==
Highways and numbered routes that run through the parish, including external routes that start or finish at the parish limits:

- **Highways**
  - None
- **Principal Routes**
  - Route 180
- Secondary Routes:
  - Route 275
- External Routes:
  - None

== See also ==
- List of parishes in New Brunswick
