= Dalhousie Parish, New Brunswick =

Dalhousie
- Parish
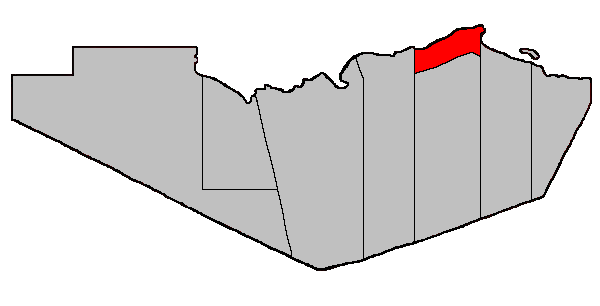
- Location within Restigouche County.
- Coordinates: 48.0025°N 66.51889°W
- Country: Canada
- Province: New Brunswick
- County: Restigouche
- Erected: 1840

Area
  - Land: 62.62 km^{2} (24.18 sq mi)

Population (2021)
  - Total: 1,090
  - Density: 17.4/km^{2} (45/sq mi)
  - Change 2016-2021: ▲2.2%
  - Dwellings: 551
- Time zone: UTC-4 (AST)
  - Summer (DST): UTC-3 (ADT)
- Figures do not include portions within the city of Campbellton, the town of Dalhousie, the villages of Atholville and Charlo, and the Eel River 3 and Indian Ranch Indian reserves

Dalhousie is a geographic parish in Restigouche County, New Brunswick, Canada. (Note: The Territorial Division Act divides the province into 152 parishes, the cities of Saint John and Fredericton, and one town of Grand Falls. The Interpretation Act clarifies that parishes include any local government within their borders.)

For governance purposes it is divided between the city of Campbellton, the town of Heron Bay, the village of Bois-Joli, and the Eel River 3 and Indian Ranch Indian reserves; the municipalities are all members of the Restigouche Regional Service Commission.

Prior to the 2023 governance reform, the parish also included parts of the town of Dalhousie, the villages of Atholville, Charlo and Eel River Crossing, and the local service districts of Dalhouse Junction, McLeods, Point La Nim, and the parish of Dalhousie, which had been reduced to scattered pieces by the creation and growth of other LSDs and municipalities. The reform merged Atholville with Campbellton, Eel River Crossing with Balmoral to form Bois-Joli, and Dalhouse with Charlo to form Heron Bay. Campbellton also annexed most of McLeods and the portion of the parish LSD west of Eel River Crossing; Bois-Joli took the remainder of McLeods and a part of the parish LSD on its northern boundary, using the railway as its new boundary; and Heron Bay annexed Dalhousie Junction, Point La Nim, and the remainder of the parish LSD.

== Origin of name ==
The parish took its name from the settlement of Dalhousie, which served as shiretown of Restigouche County from its erection. The settlement was named in honour of the Earl of Dalhousie, Governor General of British North America.

== History ==
Dalhousie was erected in 1840 from Addington Parish. Dalhousie comprised all of Restigouche Parish between lines due south from Eel River on the east and Walker Brook on the west.

In 1850 the eastern boundary was altered slightly to run due south from milepost forty-eight on the eastern side of Eel River Gully.

In 1896 the southern part of Dalhousie was erected as Balmoral Parish.

== Boundaries ==
Dalhousie Parish is bounded:

- on the north by the Restigouche River and Chaleur Bay;
- on the east by Chaleur Bay and a line running true south from near the northern end of the Eel River Bar Seawall;
- on the south by a line beginning on Mountain Brook, then running westerly along the rear line of grants along Route 11 then New Brunswick Route 280 to the Route 275, then along Route 275 to the southeastern corner of a grant to William Searls, at a point about 500 metres south of Welsh Road, then along the southern line of the Searls grant and its prolongation to the eastern line of the Balmoral Settlement, then running northerly to the corner of the Balmoral Settlement, then running westerly along the northern line of the Settlement to a point about 900 metres westerly of the junction of Val-d'Amour Road with Route 275;
- on the west by a line running true north to the most eastern point of the western side of the mouth of Walkers Brook, which runs through Campbellton;
- including all islands in front of the parish.

== Communities ==
Communities at least partly within the parish. bold indicates an incorporated municipality or Indian reserve

- **Atholville**
  - Lac-des-Lys
- **Campbellton**
  - Richardsville
- **Charlo**
- **Dalhousie**
  - Darlington
- Dalhousie Junction
- **Eel River 3**
- **Eel River Crossing**
  - Dundee
  - Eel River Cove
  - Shannonvale
  - Upper Dundee
- **Indian Ranch**
- Maple Green
- McLeods
- McNeish
- Point La Nim
- Saint-Aubin (partly in Atholville)

== Bodies of water ==
Bodies of water (Note: Not including brooks, ponds or coves.) at least partly within the parish.

- Eel River
- Restigouche River
- East Bay
- Eel Bay
- West Bay
- Dalhousie Harbour
- Eel River Gully
- Caldwell Lake
- Doucet Lake
- Lily Lake
- Prichard Lake
- Smith Lake

== Islands ==
Islands at least partly within the parish.

- Dalhousie Island
- Bonamy Rocks

== Other notable places ==
Parks, historic sites, and other noteworthy places at least partly within the parish.

- Sugarloaf Provincial Park

== Demographics ==
Parish population total does not include portions within municipalities or Indian reserves

=== Population ===
Canada census – Dalhousie community profile

	2021	2016	2011
Population	1,090 (+2.2% from 2016)	1,067 (-5.0% from 2011)	2,247 (-2.9% from 2006)
Land area	62.62 km^{2} (24.18 sq mi)	62.70 km^{2} (24.21 sq mi)	121.32 km^{2} (46.84 sq mi)
Population density	17.4/km^{2} (45/sq mi)	17.0/km^{2} (44/sq mi)	18.5/km^{2} (48/sq mi)
Median age	54.8 (M: 55.2, F: 54.4)	52.9 (M: 53.5, F: 52.2)	47.4 (M: 48.0, F: 47.0)
Private dwellings	551 (total) 497 (occupied)	531 (total)	1,053 (total)
Median household income	$70,000	$63,360	$49,743

References: 2021 2016 2011

Historical Census Data - Dalhousie Parish, New Brunswick

Year	Pop.	±%
1991	2,700	—
1996	2,826	+4.7%
2001	2,555	−9.6%

Year	Pop.	±%
2006	2,323	−9.1%
2006Adj	2,313	−0.4%
2011	2,247	−2.9%

Year	Pop.	±%
2011Adj	1,123	−50.0%
2016	1,067	−5.0%

**(Adj) adjustment due to boundary change.**

=== Language ===
Canada Census Mother Tongue - Dalhousie Parish, New Brunswick
Census	Total	French			English			French & English			Other		
Year	Responses	Count	Trend	Pop %	Count	Trend	Pop %	Count	Trend	Pop %	Count	Trend	Pop %
2016	1,055	535		50.7%	465		44.1%	35		3.3%	20		1.9%
2011	2,215	1,490	0.0%	67.27%	660	▼15.9%	29.80%	40	▲60.0%	1.80%	25	▼16.7%	1.13%
2006	2,330	1,490	▼6.0%	63.95%	785	▼3.1%	33.69%	25	▼72.2%	1.07%	30	▲20.0%	1.29%
2001	2,510	1,585	▼11.5%	63.15%	810	▼19.0%	32.27%	90	▲63.6%	3.59%	25	▲150.0%	1.00%
1996	2,855	1,790	n/a	62.70%	1,000	n/a	35.03%	55	n/a	1.92%	10	n/a	0.35%

== Access Routes ==
Highways and numbered routes that run through the parish, including external routes that start or finish at the parish limits:

- **Highways**
  - Route 11
- **Principal Routes**
  - Route 134
- Secondary Routes:
  - Route 275
  - Route 280
- External Routes:
  - None

== See also ==
- List of parishes in New Brunswick
