= Colborne Parish, New Brunswick =

Colborne
- Parish
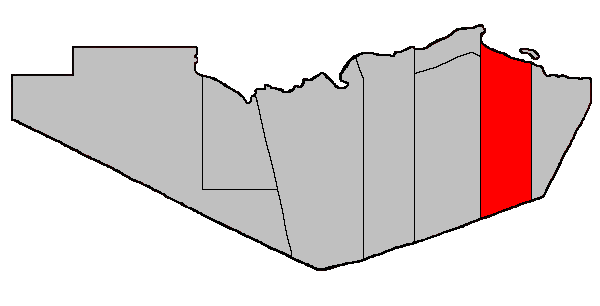
- Location within Restigouche County. Heron Island erroneously shown as part of Durham Parish.
- Coordinates: 47.8875°N 66.27°W
- Country: Canada
- Province: New Brunswick
- County: Restigouche
- Erected: 1840

Area
  - Land: 753.38 km^{2} (290.88 sq mi)

Population (2021)
  - Total: 266
  - Density: 0.4/km^{2} (1.0/sq mi)
  - Change 2016-2021: ▲17.2%
  - Dwellings: 162
- Time zone: UTC-4 (AST)
  - Summer (DST): UTC-3 (ADT)
- Figures do not include portion within the village of Charlo

Colborne is a geographic parish in Restigouche County, New Brunswick, Canada. (Note: The Territorial Division Act divides the province into 152 parishes, the cities of Saint John and Fredericton, and one town of Grand Falls. The Interpretation Act clarifies that parishes include any local government within their borders.)

For governance purposes it is divided between the town of Heron Bay, the Moose Meadows 4 Indian reserve, and the Restigouche rural district; the town and rural district are both members of the Restigouche Regional Service Commission.

Prior to the 2023 governance reform, the parish was divided between the village of Charlo, the Indian reserve, and the local service districts of Charleur and Lorne. In the 2023 reform, Charlo merged with the town of Dalhousie to form Heron Bay, which annexed Heron Island and the communities of Benjamin River, Blackland, and New Mills from Chaleur; Lorne and the remainder of Chaleur became part of the rural district.

== Origin of name ==
The parish was named in honour of John Colborne, acting Governor General of the Canadas when the parish was erected.

== History ==
Colborne was erected in 1840 from Addington and Beresford Parishes. Colborne comprised Restigouche County between the Benjamin and Eel Rivers.

In 1850 the boundaries were altered to run due south from starting points near the coast: the western boundary from milepost forty-eight on the great road (highway) from Bathurst to Dalhousie, the eastern boundary from the mouth of the Benjamin River.

== Boundaries ==
Colborne Parish is bounded:

- on the north by Chaleur Bay;
- on the east by a line running true south from the mouth of Benjamin River to the Northumberland County line;
- on the south by the county line;
- on the west by a line running true south from a point near the northern end of the Eel River Bar Seawall to the county line
- including Heron Island and any islands in front of the parish.

== Communities ==
Communities at least partly within the parish. bold indicates an incorporated municipality or Indian reserve

- Benjamin River
- Blackland
- Caribou Depot
- Lorne
- **Moose Meadows 4**
- New Mills
- Upper Crossing
- **Charlo**
  - Mountain Brook
  - River Charlo
  - Upper Charlo

== Bodies of water ==
Bodies of water (Note: Not including brooks, ponds or coves.) at least partly within the parish.

- Benjamin River
- North Branch Charlo River
- Jacquet River
- Louison River
- South Charlo River
- Southeast Upsalquitch River
- Tetagouche River
  - Harrys Bogan
- Nash Creek
- Chaleur Bay
  - Heron Channel
- Shoal Bay
- at least ten officially named lakes

== Islands ==
Islands at least partly within the parish.

- Fleming Island
- Heron Island
- West Point Island
- Thrum Rock

== Other notable places ==
Parks, historic sites, and other noteworthy places at least partly within the parish.

- Chaleur Provincial Park
- Charlo Regional Airport
- Eel River Bar Seawall
- Key Anacon Mine

== Demographics ==
Parish population total does not include Moose Meadows 4 Indian reserve or the portion within the former incorporated village of Charlo. Revised census figures based on the 2023 local governance reforms have not been released.

=== Population ===
Canada census – Colborne community profile

| | 2021 | 2016 | 2011 |
| Population | 266 (+17.2% from 2016) | 227 (+12.4% from 2011) | 202 (-13.7% from 2006) |
| Land area | 753.38 km^{2} (290.88 sq mi) | 754.96 km^{2} (291.49 sq mi) | 754.95 km^{2} (291.49 sq mi) |
| Population density | 0.4/km^{2} (1.0/sq mi) | 0.3/km^{2} (0.78/sq mi) | 0.3/km^{2} (0.78/sq mi) |
| Median age | 58.8 (M: 59.2, F: 58.0) | 55.8 (M: 55.8, F: 55.7) | 50.5 (M: 49.3, F: 53.8) |
| Private dwellings | 162 (total) 135 (occupied) | 144 (total) | 102 (total) |
| Median household income | $48,400 | $39,808 | $.N/A |

Notes: 2011 & 2006 income data for this area has been suppressed for data quality or confidentiality reasons.
References: 2021 2016 2011

Historical Census Data
Colborne Parish, NB

| Year | Pop. | ±% |
|---|---|---|
| 1991 | 328 | — |
| 1996 | 295 | −10.1% |

| Year | Pop. | ±% |
|---|---|---|
| 2001 | 270 | −8.5% |
| 2006 | 234 | −13.3% |

| Year | Pop. | ±% |
|---|---|---|
| 2011 | 202 | −13.7% |
| 2016 | 227 | +12.4% |

=== Language ===
Canada Census Mother Tongue - Colborne Parish, New Brunswick
| Census | Total | English | | | French | | | English & French | | | Other | | |
| Year | Responses | Count | Trend | Pop % | Count | Trend | Pop % | Count | Trend | Pop % | Count | Trend | Pop % |
| 2011 | 200 | 160 | ▼20.0% | 80.00% | 35 | ▲133.3% | 17.50% | 0 | ▼100.0% | 0.00% | 5 | ▲ n/a% | 2.50% |
| 2006 | 235 | 200 | ▼20.0% | 85.11% | 15 | ▼40.0% | 6.38% | 20 | ▲ n/a% | 8.51% | 0 | 0.0% | 0.00% |
| 2001 | 275 | 250 | ▲22.0% | 90.91% | 25 | ▼44.4% | 9.09% | 0 | 0.0% | 0.00% | 0 | 0.0% | 0.00% |
| 1996 | 250 | 205 | n/a | 82.00% | 45 | n/a | 18.00% | 0 | n/a | 0.00% | 0 | n/a | 0.00% |

== Access Routes ==
Highways and numbered routes that run through the parish, including external routes that start or finish at the parish limits:

- **Highways**
  - Route 11
- **Principal Routes**
  - Route 134
  - Route 180
- Secondary Routes:
  - None
- External Routes:
  - None

== See also ==
- List of parishes in New Brunswick
