= Shannonvale, New Brunswick =

Shannonvale
- Community
- Location of Shannonvale, New Brunswick
- Coordinates: 48.017778°N 66.449167°W
- Country: Canada
- Province: New Brunswick
- County: Restigouche
- Parish: Dalhousie
- Electoral Districts Federal: Madawaska—Restigouche
- Provincial: Dalhousie-Restigouche East

Government
  - Type: Eel River Crossing; Village Council
- Time zone: UTC-4 (AST)
  - Summer (DST): UTC-3 (ADT)
- Area code: 506
- Access Routes: Route 280

Shannonvale is a community in Restigouche County, New Brunswick, Canada. It is part of the village of Eel River Crossing.

== See also ==
- List of neighbourhoods in New Brunswick
