= Eel River Cove, New Brunswick =

Eel River Cove
- Community
- Location within New Brunswick.
- Coordinates: 48.00°N 66.32°W
- Country: Canada
- Province: New Brunswick
- County: Restigouche
- Parish: Dalhousie
- Municipality: Eel River Crossing
- Electoral Districts Federal: Madawaska—Restigouche
- Provincial: Dalhousie-Restigouche East

Government
  - Type: Eel River Crossing; Village Council
- Time zone: UTC-4 (AST)
  - Summer (DST): UTC-3 (ADT)
- Postal code(s): E8E
- Area code: 506
- Highways Route 11: Route 280

Eel River Cove is a community in Restigouche County, New Brunswick, Canada. It is part of the village of Eel River Crossing.

== See also ==
- List of communities in New Brunswick
