= Dundee, New Brunswick =

Dundee
- Community
- Location of Dundee, New Brunswick
- Coordinates: 48.017778°N 66.449167°W
- Country: Canada
- Province: New Brunswick
- County: Restigouche
- Parish: Dalhousie
- Electoral Districts Federal: Madawaska—Restigouche
- Provincial: Dalhousie-Restigouche East

Government
  - Type: Eel River Crossing; Village Council
- Time zone: UTC-4 (AST)
  - Summer (DST): UTC-3 (ADT)
- Postal code(s): E8E: 1V8-1V9, 1W1-1W9, 1X1-1X9; 1Y1-1Y7, 1Y9, 1Z1-1Z9; 2A1-2A4
- Area code: 506
- Access Routes: Route 280

Dundee is a community in Restigouche County, New Brunswick, Canada. It is named after Dundee in Scotland.

== See also ==
- List of communities in New Brunswick
