= Sacha Labillois-Kennedy =

Chief of the Eel River Bar First Nation, New Brunswick, Canada

Sacha Labillois was a Chief of the Eel River Bar First Nation in New Brunswick, Canada. She first served as a councillor for two years, before being elected Chief in June 2019 and went on to serve 4 years as Chief, before Jake Caplin defeated her.

She served as the First Nation's economic development officer since February 2008, earning her a nomination for “Economic development officer of the year” in 2017 by Cando, national Indigenous organization involved in community economic development.

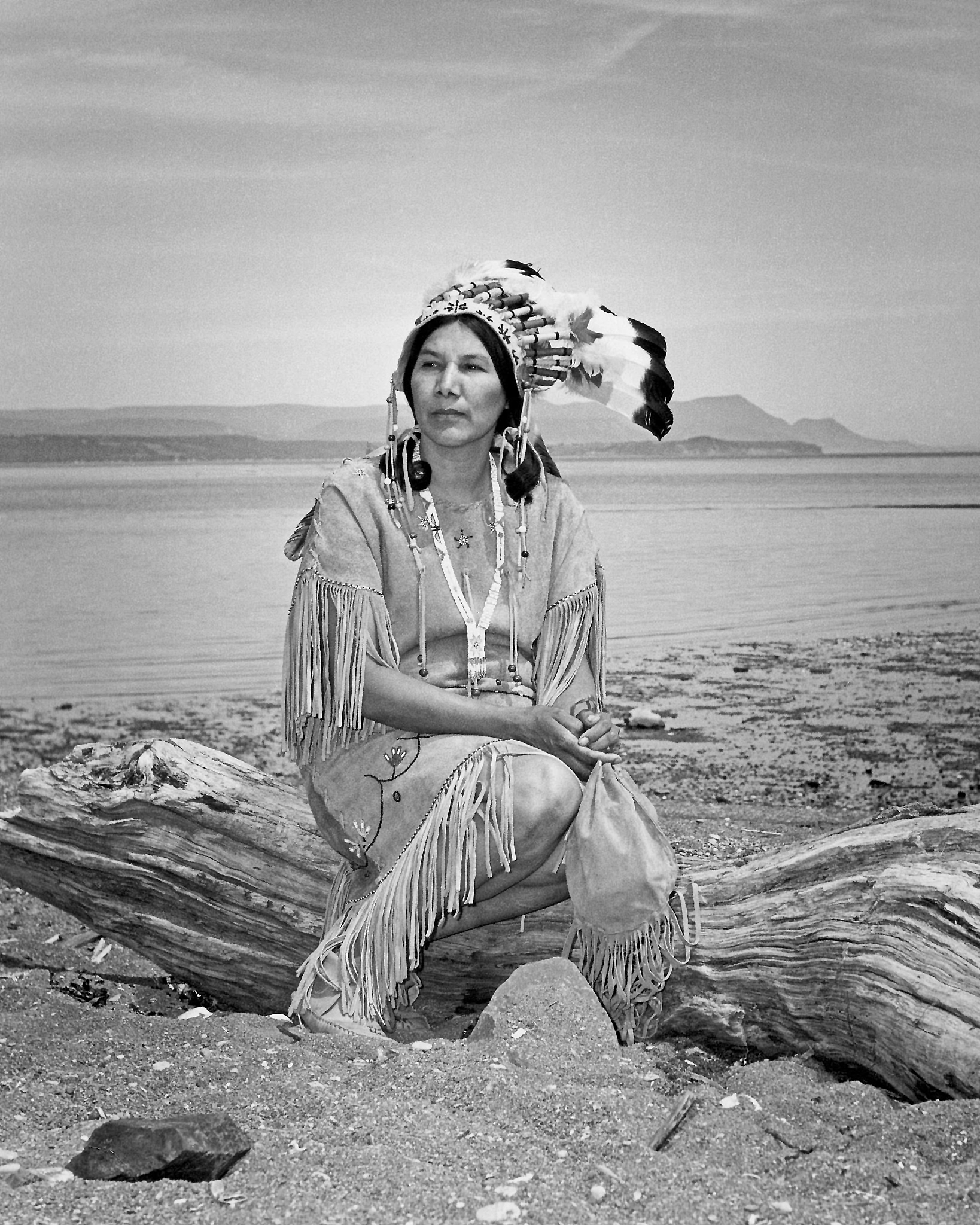
Labillois's grandmother, Margaret Labillois in 1970.

Labillois is fluent in both English and French.

Her grandmother is Margaret Labillois, the first woman in New Brunswick to be named a chief of a first nations community in 1970.
