= Little Southeast Upsalquitch River =

Location
- Country: Canada

Physical characteristics
- Source
  - location: Balmoral Parish, Restigouche County, New Brunswick
  - coordinates: 47°42′39″N 66°24′42″W
  - elevation: 440 m (1,440 ft)
- Mouth
  - location: Balmoral Parish, Restigouche County, New Brunswick
  - coordinates: 47°38′26″N 66°34′54″W
  - elevation: 143 m (469 ft)
- Length: 30.3 km (18.8 mi)

Basin features
- Tributaries
  - left: (from confluence) Caribou Brook, Middle Brook, Red Brook, North Branch Akroyd Brook.

The Little Southeast Upsalquitch River is a tributary of the East bank of the Southeast Upsalquitch River, flowing entirely in the Balmoral Parish, in Restigouche County, in the Northwest of New Brunswick, in Canada.

== Geography ==
The Little Southeast Upsalquitch River rises at the foot (south side) of the Black Top Mountain in Restigouche County. This source is located in forested area:

- 14.1 kilometres (8.8 mi) Northeast of the confluence of the "Little Upsalquitch East River";
- 20.4 kilometres (12.7 mi) southwest of the confluence of the Upsalquitch Southeast River;
- 45.3 kilometres (28.1 mi) southeast of the confluence of the Upsalquitch River;
- 38.5 kilometres (23.9 mi) southeast of Campbellton bridge, crossing the Restigouche River.

From its source, the Little Southeast Upsalquitch River flows 30.3 kilometres (18.8 mi) in a small valley surrounded by high mountains, in the following segments:

- 6.8 kilometres (4.2 mi) to Southwest, up to a bend of the river;
- 5.6 kilometres (3.5 mi) westward up to Caribou Brook (from the north);
- 6.7 kilometres (4.2 mi) westward up to Middle Brook;
- 0.4 kilometres (0.25 mi) westward up to Red Brook;
- 1.7 kilometres (1.1 mi) westward up to North Branch Brook Akroyd (from the West);
- 1.7 kilometres (1.1 mi) to Southwest up to a stream (from the East);
- 7.4 kilometres (4.6 mi) to Southwest, up to the confluence of the "Little Upsalquitch Southeast River".

The Little Southeast Upsalquitch River empties into a river curve on the East bank of the Southeast Upsalquitch River. The confluence of the Little Southeast Upsalquitch River is located at: • 9.8 kilometres (6.1 mi) Southeast of the confluence of the Upsalquitch Southeast River; • 40.9 kilometres (25.4 mi) Southeast of the confluence of the Upsalquitch River.

== See also ==
Media related to Category: Little Upsalquitch Southeast River at Wikimedia Commons

- Restigouche County
- Balmoral Parish
- List of rivers of New Brunswick
- Chaleur Bay
- Gulf of Saint Lawrence
- Restigouche River
- Upsalquitch River
- Upsalquitch Southeast River
