= River Charlo, New Brunswick =

River Charlo
- Neighbourhood
- Location of River Charlo, New Brunswick
- Coordinates: 47.98°N 66.28°W
- Country: Canada
- Province: New Brunswick
- County: Restigouche
- Parish: Colborne
- Electoral Districts Federal: Madawaska-Restigouche
- Provincial: Dalhousie-Restigouche East

Government
  - Type: Charlo Village Council
- Time zone: UTC-4 (AST)
  - Summer (DST): UTC-3 (ADT)
- Area code: 506
- Access Routes: Route 134

River Charlo is a community in Restigouche County, New Brunswick, Canada. It is part of the village of Charlo. Named for an early resident, Charles, or "Charlo", Doucet.

== See also ==
- List of neighbourhoods in New Brunswick
