= Benjamin River, New Brunswick =

Benjamin River
- Unincorporated community
- Location within New Brunswick.
- Coordinates: 47.97°N 66.17°W
- Country: Canada
- Province: New Brunswick
- County: Restigouche
- Parish: Colborne
- Electoral Districts Federal: Miramichi
- Provincial: Dalhousie-Restigouche East

Government
  - Type: Local service district
- Time zone: UTC-4 (AST)
  - Summer (DST): UTC-3 (ADT)
- Postal code(s): E8G
- Area code: 506
- Highways: Route 134

Benjamin River is an unincorporated community in Restigouche County, New Brunswick, Canada.

== See also ==
- List of communities in New Brunswick
