= Lorne, New Brunswick =

Lorne
- Unincorporated community
- Location within New Brunswick.
- Coordinates: 47.88°N 66.13°W
- Country: Canada
- Province: New Brunswick
- County: Restigouche
- Parish: Durham
- Settled: 1879
- Named after: Marquis of Lorne
- Electoral Districts Federal: Madawaska—Restigouche
- Provincial: Dalhousie-Restigouche East

Government
  - Type: Local service district

Population
  - Total: 176
- Time zone: UTC-4 (AST)
  - Summer (DST): UTC-3 (ADT)
- Postal code(s): E8G
- Area code: 506
- Highways: None

Lorne was a local service district in Colborne and Durham Parishes, Restigouche County, New Brunswick, Canada.

== History ==
Lorne is named for the Marquis of Lorne, John Campbell, 9th Duke of Argyll.

Lorne was settled in 1879. By 1898, Lorne was a farming settlement with a post office and a population of 75. The post office was established in 1893 and closed in 1967.

Lorne used to have several stores and businesses but due to declining and aging population as well as a troubled economy many of these businesses are now gone. The local gas station was the villages last gas station and convenience store and general gossiping area of the town before being closed down in late 2018.

Anyone from the Colborne part of the community is considered "Colbornian" as an ongoing joke for multiple generations.

== Demographics ==
In the 2021 Census of Population conducted by Statistics Canada, Lorne had a population of 516 living in 278 of its 324 total private dwellings, a change of −14% from its 2016 population of 600. With a land area of 32.83 km^{2} (12.68 sq mi), it had a population density of 15.7/km^{2} (40.7/sq mi) in 2021.

== See also ==
- Royal eponyms in Canada
