= Darlington, New Brunswick =

Darlington
- Unincorporated community
- Location of Darlington, New Brunswick
- Coordinates: 48.048056°N 66.383611°W
- Country: Canada
- Province: New Brunswick
- County: Restigouche
- Parish: Dalhousie
- Electoral Districts Federal: Madawaska—Restigouche
- Provincial: Dalhousie-Restigouche East
- Time zone: UTC-4 (AST)
  - Summer (DST): UTC-3 (ADT)
- Area code: 506
- Access Routes: Route 134; Route 275

Darlington is a former village in Restigouche County, New Brunswick, Canada. it is now a part of the Town of Dalhousie. Darlington also contains the town's only shopping center the Darlington Mall.

== History ==
Federal census population history of Darlington
Year	Pop.	±%
1976A	740	—
1981	749	+1.2%
Source: Statistics Canada

It was incorporated as a Village in 1977 then merged into the Town of Dalhousie November 4, 1982. The main street (Route 275) through the former village was renamed Darlington Drive after amalgamation. It became residential in the post war housing period in the late 1940s and 50s, when farmland was subdivided. The first mayor of Darlington, was Richard W. Taylor who won by a landslide. He won a second term by acclamation, but died shortly after this. It was after this that it was amalgamated with Dalhousie.

== See also ==
- List of neighbourhoods in New Brunswick
