= Popelogan River =

Location
- Country: Canada

Physical characteristics
- Source
  - location: Addington Parish, Restigouche County, New Brunswick
  - coordinates: 47°49′52″N 66°40′10″W
  - elevation: 275 m (902 ft)
- Mouth
  - location: Addington Parish, Restigouche County, New Brunswick
  - coordinates: 47°53′32″N 66°57′22″W
  - elevation: 65 m (213 ft)
- Length: 28.7 km (17.8 mi)

Basin features
- Tributaries
  - left: (from confluence) Gordon Brook, Arsenault Brook, Popelogan Lake Branch.
  - right: (from confluence) Petteller Gulch

The Popelogan River is a tributary of the Upsalquitch River. It flows through the parish of Addington in Restigouche County in north-west New Brunswick, Canada.

In its course to the south, the Popelogan River flows through a valley in a terrain that becomes increasingly mountainous as it nears the Upsalquitch. Its main tributaries are the Gordon Brook and the Lake Popelogan Branch, which supplies Popelogan Lake. The upper part of the river is served by a forest road from Popelogan Depot.

== Geography ==
Popelogan River rises in the western part of White Meadows in the parish of Addington, 0.7 kilometres (0.43 mi) west of the boundary of the parish's boundary with the parish of Balmoral. The upper part of the river flows south-west into a small valley, which extends towards the north-east towards the watershed of the Goullette Brook, a tributary of the Charlo River.

The source of the Popelogan River is located in a forest area:

- 15.0 kilometres (9.3 mi) north-east of the confluence of the Popelogan River;
- 21.0 kilometres (13.0 mi) south-east of the confluence of the Upsalquitch River;
- 18.6 kilometres (11.6 mi) south of Campbellton bridge across the Restigouche River.

The river is 28.7 kilometres (17.8 mi) long. Its segments are as follows:

- 1.3 kilometres (0.81 mi) to the south-west, up to the boundary of the parish of Balmoral in Restigouche County;
- 0.7 kilometres (0.43 mi) to the south through Balmoral, making a detour to the east to the boundary of the parish of Addington;
- 4.3 kilometres (2.7 mi) to the south-west in Addington up to a stream that joins the Popelogan from the south-west;
- 1.3 kilometres (0.81 mi) to the south, up to the Branch Lake Popelogan (from the east);
- 6.0 kilometres (3.7 mi) to the south-west, up to Arsenault Brook (from the south-east);
- 5.1 kilometres (3.2 mi) to the north, up to Petteller Gulch (from the north);
- 10.0 kilometres (6.2 mi) to the south, up to the confluence of the River Popelogan.

The Popelogan River empties on the east bank of the Upsalquitch River in the Crooked Rapids area. The confluence of the Popelogan is located:

- 25.0 kilometres (15.5 mi) south-east of the confluence of the Upsalquitch River;
- 35.9 kilometres (22.3 mi) south of the New Brunswick bridge across the Restigouche River.

== See also ==
Media related to Category: Popelogan river at Wikimedia Commons

- Restigouche County
- Balmoral Parish
- Addington Parish
- Chaleur Bay
- Gulf of Saint Lawrence
- Restigouche River
- Upsalquitch River
- List of rivers of New Brunswick
