= Southeast Upsalquitch River =

Location
- Country: Canada

Physical characteristics
- Source
  - location: Upsalquitch Lake, Northumberland County, New Brunswick
  - coordinates: 47°29′05″N 66°29′49″W
  - elevation: 251 metres (823 ft)
- Mouth
  - location: Addington Parish, Restigouche County, New Brunswick
  - coordinates: 47°40′19″N 66°42′28″W
  - elevation: 75 metres (246 ft)
- Length: 39.6 km (24.6 mi)

Basin features
- Tributaries
  - left: (from the confluence) Caribou Brook, Ferguson Brook, Nine Mile Brook, Oxbow Brook, McCormack Brook, Ramsay Brook, Simpsons Brook
  - right: (from the confluence) Levesque Gulch, Little Popetogan Brook, Basket Brook, Little Southeast Upsalquitch River, England Brook, Meadow Brook, Murray Brook, Eithteen Mile Brook, Cook Savoie Gulch

The Southeast Upsalquitch River is an eastern tributary of the Upsalquitch River in the northwest of New Brunswick, Canada, flowing through Northumberland County and Balmoral Parish and Addington Parish in Restigouche County.

In its course towards the northwest, the Southeast Upsalquitch River runs through the Naturalists Mountains and passes to the northeast of Caribou Mountain.

== Geography ==
The Southeast Upsalquitch River originates at the mouth of Upsalquitch Lake (length: 1.6 kilometres (0.99 mi); height: 251 metres (823 ft)), in the Northumberland County. This lake is located in a small north–south valley that extends to the south on the other hydrographic side to Popple Depot, located on the north bank of the Nepisiguit River. Upsalquitch Lake is embedded in the Naturalists Mountains.

The mouth of Lake Upsalquitch is located in a forested area:

- 2.3 kilometres (1.4 mi) to the west of the summit of Mount Perley (Northumberland County)
- 3.3 kilometres (2.1 mi) to the northwest of the summit of Mount Chamberlain (Northumberland County)
- 2.6 kilometres (1.6 mi) to the northeast of the summit of Mount Hay (Northumberland County)
- 0.1 kilometres (0.062 mi) to the south of the southern boundary of Balmoral Parish (Restigouche County)
- 24.3 kilometres (15.1 mi) to the southwest of the confluence of the Little Southeast Upsalquitch River
- 58.8 kilometres (36.5 mi) to the southwest of the confluence of the Upsalquitch River

From the outlet of Lake Upsalquitch, the Southeast Upsalquitch River flows 39.6 kilometres (24.6 mi) in a little valley surrounded by high mountains, in the following segments:

Upper course of the river (segment of 19.7 kilometres (12.2 mi))

- 0.1 kilometres (0.062 mi) northward, up to the border of Balmoral Parish
- 2.9 kilometres (1.8 mi) northeastward to Cook Savoie Gulch (from the east)
- 6.1 kilometres (3.8 mi) northwestward in Balmoral Parish to Eighteen Mile Brook
- 4.2 kilometres (2.6 mi) northwestward to Murray Brook (from the northeast)
- 0.2 kilometres (0.12 mi) westward to Ramsay Brook (from the southwest)
- 2.2 kilometres (1.4 mi) northward to McCormack Brook (from the west)
- 4.0 kilometres (2.5 mi) northward to Meadow Brook (from the east)

Lower course of the river (segment of 19.9 kilometres (12.4 mi))

- 5.9 kilometres (3.7 mi) northwestward to Mulligan Brook (from the southwest)
- 0.7 kilometres (0.43 mi) northward to the Little Southeast Upsalquitch River (from the northeast)
- 5.5 kilometres (3.4 mi) northwestward to Ferguson Brook (from the Southwest)
- 7.8 kilometres (4.8 mi) westward, crossing the Southeast Lower Falls and passing north of Caribou Mountain, to its confluence with the Upsalquitch River

The Southeast Upsalquitch River empties into a river curve on the east bank of the Upsalquitch River. The mouth of the Southeast Upsalquitch River is 29.3 kilometres (18.2 mi) southeast of the mouth of the Upsalquitch River.

== Climate ==
Upsalquitch Lake has a subarctic climate (Dfc). Summers are typically rainy and mild with only a handful of warm days and cool nighttime temperatures. Winters are some of the longest, coldest and snowiest in New Brunswick, with annual snowfall averaging 130 inches (330 cm). Winters can begin towards the end of October and last well into April.

Climate data for Upsalquitch Lake, New Brunswick (1981-2010): 625m
| Month | Jan | Feb | Mar | Apr | May | Jun | Jul | Aug | Sep | Oct | Nov | Dec | Year |
|---|---|---|---|---|---|---|---|---|---|---|---|---|---|
| Record high °C (°F) | 12.0 (53.6) | 11.0 (51.8) | 18.0 (64.4) | 23.0 (73.4) | 31.0 (87.8) | 34.0 (93.2) | 31.1 (88.0) | 32.0 (89.6) | 30.0 (86.0) | 25.0 (77.0) | 17.0 (62.6) | 10.0 (50.0) | 34.0 (93.2) |
| Mean daily maximum °C (°F) | −8.0 (17.6) | −5.6 (21.9) | −0.3 (31.5) | 5.2 (41.4) | 12.9 (55.2) | 18.6 (65.5) | 21.3 (70.3) | 20.1 (68.2) | 15.3 (59.5) | 7.5 (45.5) | 0.7 (33.3) | −4.7 (23.5) | 6.9 (44.5) |
| Daily mean °C (°F) | −13.1 (8.4) | −10.8 (12.6) | −5.6 (21.9) | 0.4 (32.7) | 7.2 (45.0) | 12.8 (55.0) | 15.9 (60.6) | 15.1 (59.2) | 10.4 (50.7) | 3.5 (38.3) | −2.9 (26.8) | −9.1 (15.6) | 2.0 (35.6) |
| Mean daily minimum °C (°F) | −18.3 (−0.9) | −16.0 (3.2) | −10.9 (12.4) | −4.3 (24.3) | 1.6 (34.9) | 7.0 (44.6) | 10.5 (50.9) | 10.0 (50.0) | 5.5 (41.9) | −0.5 (31.1) | −6.6 (20.1) | −13.5 (7.7) | −3.0 (26.7) |
| Record low °C (°F) | −37.0 (−34.6) | −36.5 (−33.7) | −33.5 (−28.3) | −23.0 (−9.4) | −11.7 (10.9) | −6.0 (21.2) | −1.0 (30.2) | −2.0 (28.4) | −8.0 (17.6) | −11.0 (12.2) | −25.0 (−13.0) | −35.0 (−31.0) | −37.0 (−34.6) |
| Average precipitation mm (inches) | 85.6 (3.37) | 49.3 (1.94) | 84.6 (3.33) | 87.6 (3.45) | 100.5 (3.96) | 104.4 (4.11) | 130.8 (5.15) | 106.2 (4.18) | 101.2 (3.98) | 106.8 (4.20) | 74.2 (2.92) | 68.6 (2.70) | 1,099.8 (43.29) |
| Average snowfall cm (inches) | 66.8 (26.3) | 42.8 (16.9) | 68.7 (27.0) | 51.3 (20.2) | 5.1 (2.0) | 0.0 (0.0) | 0.0 (0.0) | 0.0 (0.0) | 0.6 (0.2) | 14.3 (5.6) | 29.9 (11.8) | 50.4 (19.8) | 329.9 (129.8) |
| Average precipitation days (≥ 0.2 mm) | 11.8 | 8.6 | 10.9 | 12.4 | 14.4 | 13.4 | 15.3 | 13.5 | 13.7 | 14.1 | 11.7 | 10.5 | 150.3 |
| Average snowy days (≥ 0.2 cm) | 10.7 | 7.8 | 8.7 | 7.1 | 1.0 | 0.0 | 0.0 | 0.0 | 0.1 | 2.4 | 6.3 | 9.0 | 53.0 |
Source: Environment Canada

== See also ==
Media related to Category: Upsalquitch Southeast River at Wikimedia Commons

- List of rivers of New Brunswick
- Chaleur Bay
- Gulf of Saint Lawrence
- Restigouche River
- Northumberland County, county of New Brunswick
