= New Brunswick Route 280 =

Highway in New Brunswick, Canada

Route 280

Route information
- Maintained by New Brunswick Department of Transportation
- Length: 18 km (11 mi)
- Existed: 1965–present

Major junctions
- West end: Route 134 in McLeods
- Route 11 in McLeods; Route 11 / Route 275 in Eel River Crossing
- East end: Route 134 in Charlo

Location
- Country: Canada
- Province: New Brunswick
- Counties: Restigouche
- Major cities: Eel River Crossing, Charlo

Highway system
- Provincial highways in New Brunswick; Former routes
← Route 275	→ Route 303

Route 280 is an 18 km (11 mi) local highway in northeast New Brunswick, Canada.

== Communities along Route 280 ==
- McLeods
- Upper Dundee
- Shannonvale
- Dundee
- Eel River Cove
- Charlo

== See also ==
- List of New Brunswick provincial highways
