= New Brunswick Route 275 =

Highway in New Brunswick, Canada

Route 275

Route information
- Maintained by New Brunswick Department of Transportation
- Length: 49.9 km (31.0 mi)
- Existed: 1965–present

Major junctions
- West end: Route 17 in Glencoe
- Route 11 in Dalhousie
- East end: Route 134 in Darlington

Location
- Country: Canada
- Province: New Brunswick
- Counties: Restigouche
- Major cities: Balmoral, Eel River Crossing, Dalhousie

Highway system
- Provincial highways in New Brunswick; Former routes
← Route 265	→ Route 280

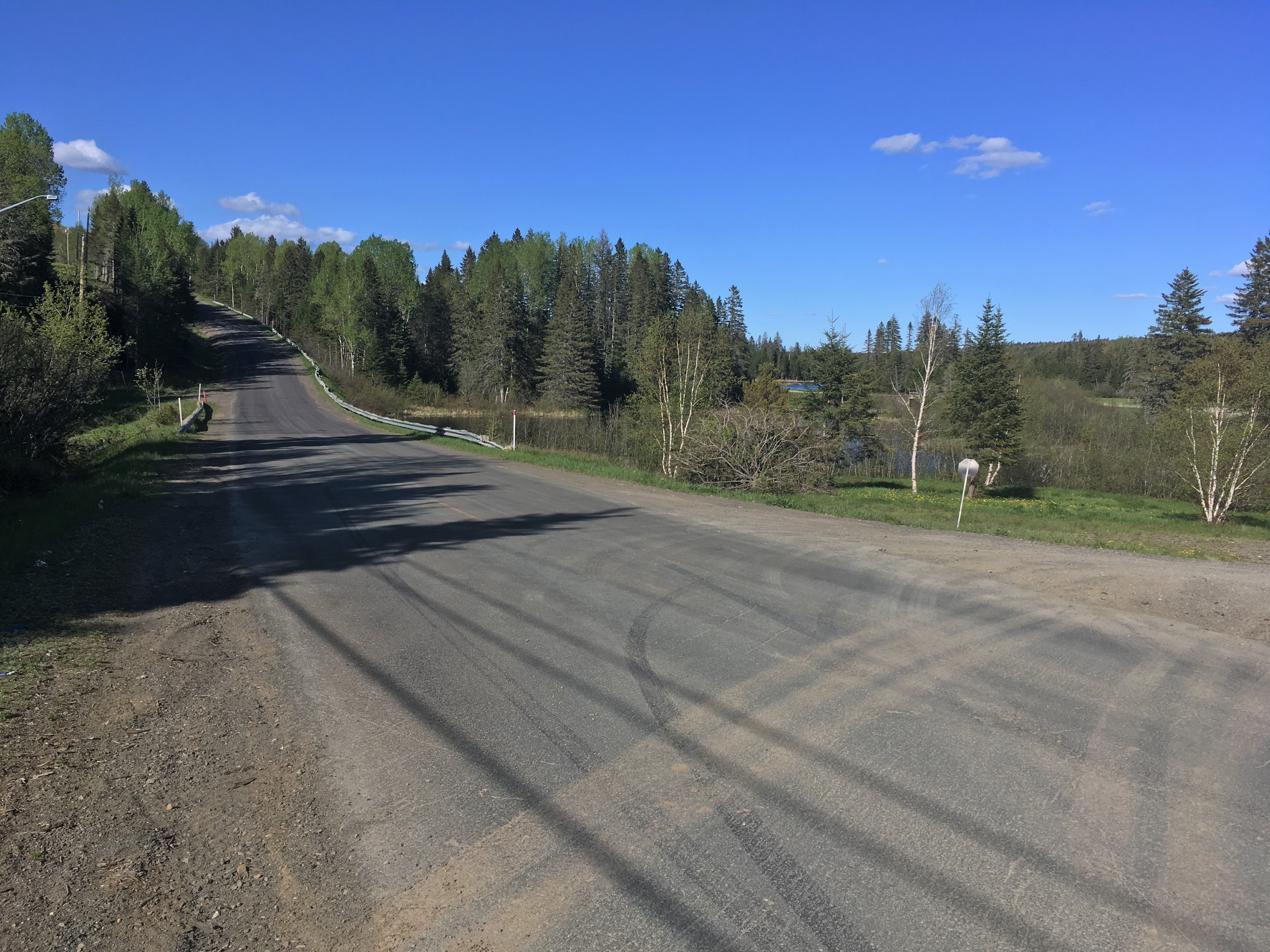
Route 275 in Saint-Arthur

Route 275 is a 49.9 km (31.0 mi)-long local highway in northeast New Brunswick, Canada.

== Communities along Route 275 ==
- Glencoe
- Val-Melanson
- Saint-Arthur
- McKendrick
- Maltais
- Blair Athol
- Upper Balmoral
- Balmoral
- Selwood
- Eel River Crossing
- Darlington

== See also ==
- List of New Brunswick provincial highways
