= Charlo, New Brunswick =

Former village in New Brunswick

Charlo
- Community (Dissolved village)
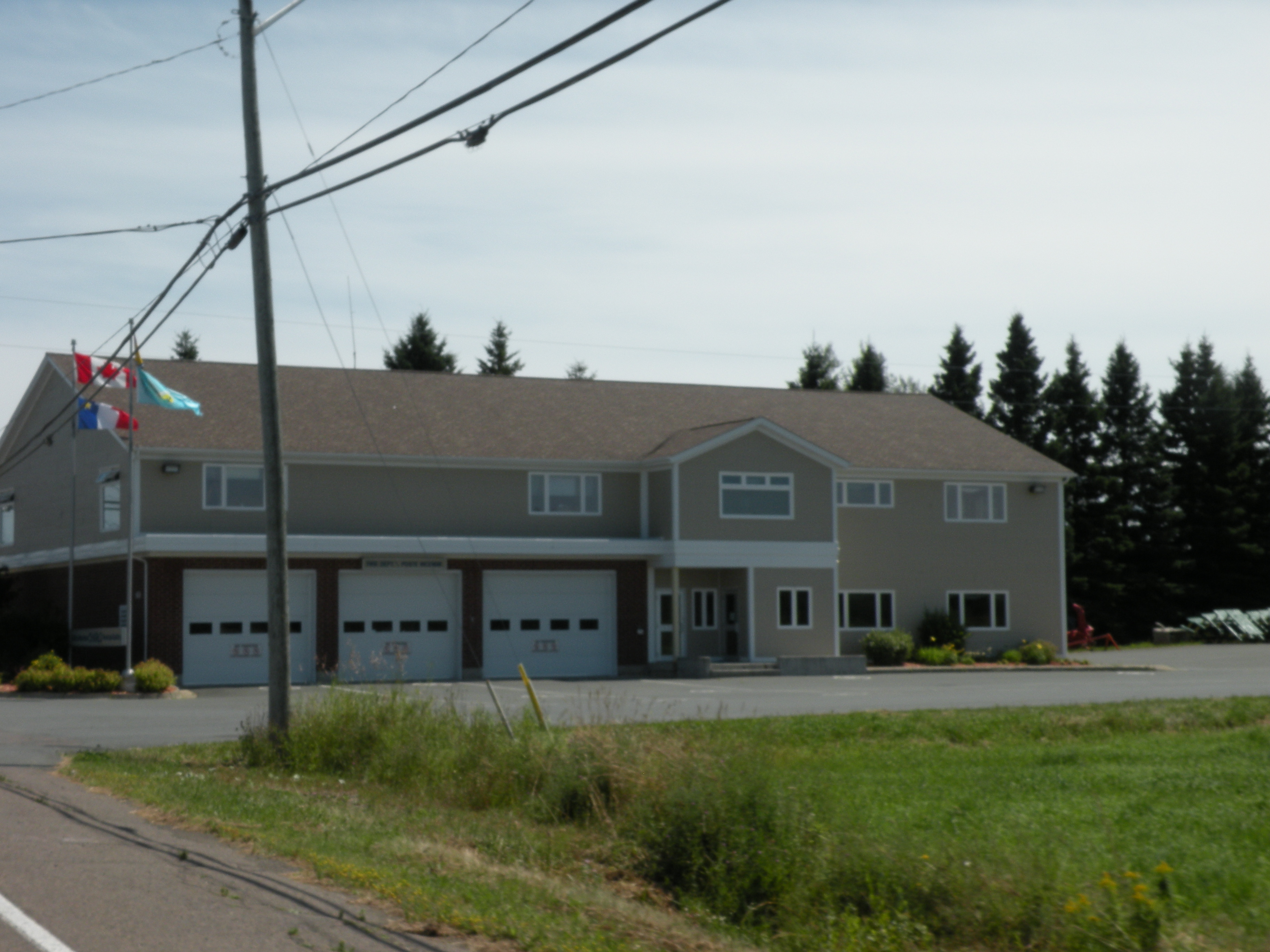
- Charlo Municipal Building, 2012

- Seal
- Motto(s): By the Bay; French: Sur la Baie
- Location within New Brunswick.
- Coordinates: 48.00°N 66.32°W
- Country: Canada
- Province: New Brunswick
- County: Restigouche
- Parish: Colborne
- Town: Heron Bay
- Founded: 1799; 227 years ago
- Incorporated: 1966; 60 years ago (village)
- Amalgamated: January 1, 2023; 3 years ago
- Electoral Districts Federal: Madawaska—Restigouche
- Provincial: Campbellton-Dalhousie

Area
  - Land: 31.45 km^{2} (12.14 sq mi)

Population (2021)
  - Total: 1,323
  - Density: 42.1/km^{2} (109/sq mi)
  - Change (2016–21): ▲1.0%
  - Dwellings: 724
- Time zone: UTC-4 (AST)
  - Summer (DST): UTC-3 (ADT)
- Postal code: E8E
- Area code: 506
- Highways Route 11 Route 134: Route 280
- Median income: CA$63,659 (2015)
- Website: www.villagecharlo.com

Charlo (/ˈʃɑːrloʊ/ SHAR-loh) is a former village which was dissolved in 2023 and was amalgamated with Dalhousie to form the new town of Heron Bay in Restigouche County, New Brunswick. The name is still kept for address purposes.

== History ==
Situated on the south shore of Chaleur Bay, the community was first settled by Acadians in 1799 (except for the Thompson family who emigrated from Ireland through the port of New York who settled 1784–1790 and was granted land by the Crown in 1824 next to the church property) and incorporated in 1966. River Charlo is one of its neighbourhoods.

On January 1, 2023, Charlo amalgamated with the town of Dalhousie and all or part of five local service districts to form the new town of Heron Bay. The community's name remains in official use.

== Demographics ==
In the 2021 Census of Population conducted by Statistics Canada, Charlo had a population of 1,323 living in 632 of its 724 total private dwellings, a change of 1% from its 2016 population of 1,310. With a land area of 31.45 km^{2} (12.14 sq mi), it had a population density of 42.1/km^{2} (109.0/sq mi) in 2021.

Population trend

Census	Population	Change (%)
2016	1,310	▼1.1%
2011	1,324	▼4.5%
2006	1,386 Adj	▼5.0%
2001	1,449	▼10.0%
1996	1,610	▲0.8%
1991	1,597	N/A

=== Language ===
Mother tongue (2016)

Language	Population	Pct (%)
French only	835	63.7%
English only	435	33.2%
Both English and French	30	2.3%
Other languages	10	0.8%

== Climate ==
Climate data for Charlo Airport, 1991−2020 normals, extremes 1966−present
Month	Jan	Feb	Mar	Apr	May	Jun	Jul	Aug	Sep	Oct	Nov	Dec	Year
Record high humidex	15.0	15.6	22.4	28.9	39.4	44.0	42.3	43.4	41.1	30.5	24.8	13.5	44.0
Record high °C (°F)	14.2 (57.6)	14.4 (57.9)	22.6 (72.7)	28.8 (83.8)	33.6 (92.5)	36.7 (98.1)	35.8 (96.4)	36.0 (96.8)	33.4 (92.1)	28.9 (84.0)	23.0 (73.4)	17.2 (63.0)	36.7 (98.1)
Mean maximum °C (°F)	4.3 (39.7)	4.1 (39.4)	10.0 (50.0)	18.2 (64.8)	26.2 (79.2)	30.0 (86.0)	30.9 (87.6)	30.4 (86.7)	27.4 (81.3)	20.8 (69.4)	14.6 (58.3)	6.1 (43.0)	32.4 (90.3)
Mean daily maximum °C (°F)	−7.0 (19.4)	−5.5 (22.1)	0.0 (32.0)	6.5 (43.7)	14.8 (58.6)	20.5 (68.9)	23.8 (74.8)	23.2 (73.8)	18.2 (64.8)	10.7 (51.3)	3.5 (38.3)	−3.0 (26.6)	8.8 (47.8)
Daily mean °C (°F)	−11.7 (10.9)	−10.6 (12.9)	−4.9 (23.2)	2.0 (35.6)	9.2 (48.6)	14.8 (58.6)	18.4 (65.1)	17.7 (63.9)	12.8 (55.0)	6.4 (43.5)	−0.1 (31.8)	−6.8 (19.8)	3.9 (39.0)
Mean daily minimum °C (°F)	−16.2 (2.8)	−15.6 (3.9)	−9.8 (14.4)	−2.5 (27.5)	3.4 (38.1)	9.2 (48.6)	13.0 (55.4)	12.1 (53.8)	7.3 (45.1)	2.1 (35.8)	−3.6 (25.5)	−10.6 (12.9)	−0.9 (30.4)
Mean minimum °C (°F)	−26.9 (−16.4)	−26.6 (−15.9)	−22.6 (−8.7)	−10.0 (14.0)	−2.4 (27.7)	2.3 (36.1)	7.4 (45.3)	6.1 (43.0)	0.0 (32.0)	−4.6 (23.7)	−13.2 (8.2)	−21.7 (−7.1)	−28.7 (−19.7)
Record low °C (°F)	−36.5 (−33.7)	−32.2 (−26.0)	−30.1 (−22.2)	−20.3 (−4.5)	−8.3 (17.1)	−1.6 (29.1)	3.3 (37.9)	−0.1 (31.8)	−3.3 (26.1)	−9.4 (15.1)	−20.6 (−5.1)	−31.7 (−25.1)	−36.5 (−33.7)
Record low wind chill	−51.1	−45.3	−38.7	−26.6	−16.6	−5.4	0.0	0.0	−7.9	−14.9	−26.8	−42.4	−51.1
Average precipitation mm (inches)	71.3 (2.81)	65.2 (2.57)	78.7 (3.10)	69.1 (2.72)	91.8 (3.61)	90.2 (3.55)	104.2 (4.10)	81.6 (3.21)	101.0 (3.98)	94.3 (3.71)	87.3 (3.44)	76.2 (3.00)	1,010.9 (39.80)
Average snowfall cm (inches)	88.7 (34.9)	75.3 (29.6)	64.4 (25.4)	31.7 (12.5)	3.8 (1.5)	0.0 (0.0)	0.0 (0.0)	0.0 (0.0)	0.0 (0.0)	3.1 (1.2)	34.3 (13.5)	63.6 (25.0)	364.9 (143.7)
Average precipitation days (≥ 0.2 mm)	15.6	14.9	16.5	15.5	16.0	15.8	18.7	16.0	14.8	15.6	15.3	15.9	190.8
Average snowy days (≥ 0.2 cm)	14.2	11.5	10.3	6.0	0.77	0.0	0.0	0.0	0.0	0.86	7.5	12.8	63.8
Average relative humidity (%) (at 15:00 LST)	67.3	63.9	61.3	58.9	56.0	59.0	60.7	59.9	62.0	65.2	69.5	72.7	63.0
Average dew point °C (°F)	−15.3 (4.5)	−14.4 (6.1)	−9.4 (15.1)	−3.5 (25.7)	3.2 (37.8)	9.4 (48.9)	13.6 (56.5)	13.0 (55.4)	8.7 (47.7)	2.5 (36.5)	−3.6 (25.5)	−9.8 (14.4)	−0.4 (31.3)
Mean monthly sunshine hours	117.7	133.1	155.9	171.9	219.2	246.8	254.7	243.1	170.3	131.9	84.9	98.8	2,028.4
Percentage possible sunshine	42.8	46.3	42.3	42.1	46.7	51.5	52.7	54.9	45.0	39.1	30.4	37.7	44.3
Source 1: Environment Canada (snow, sun 1981–2010)
Source 2: weatherstats.ca (for dewpoint and monthly&yearly average absolute maximum&minimum temperature)

== Infrastructure ==
The Charlo Airport, the only airport in the region, offered scheduled air service between 1963 and 2001. In October 2012, Provincial Airlines began trial flights at the Charlo Airport. In January 2013, after deeming that there was sufficient demand, they made the trial flights permanent. However, service to the airport was terminated in 2020.

VIA Rail's train, The Ocean, makes stops on request at the Charlo station, a flag stop platform. The station shelter was demolished, along with nearby Jacquet River station, in October 2021.

== See also ==
- List of villages in New Brunswick
