= Eel River Crossing, New Brunswick =

Community in Bois-Joli, New Brunswick

Eel River Crossing
- Community (Dissolved village)
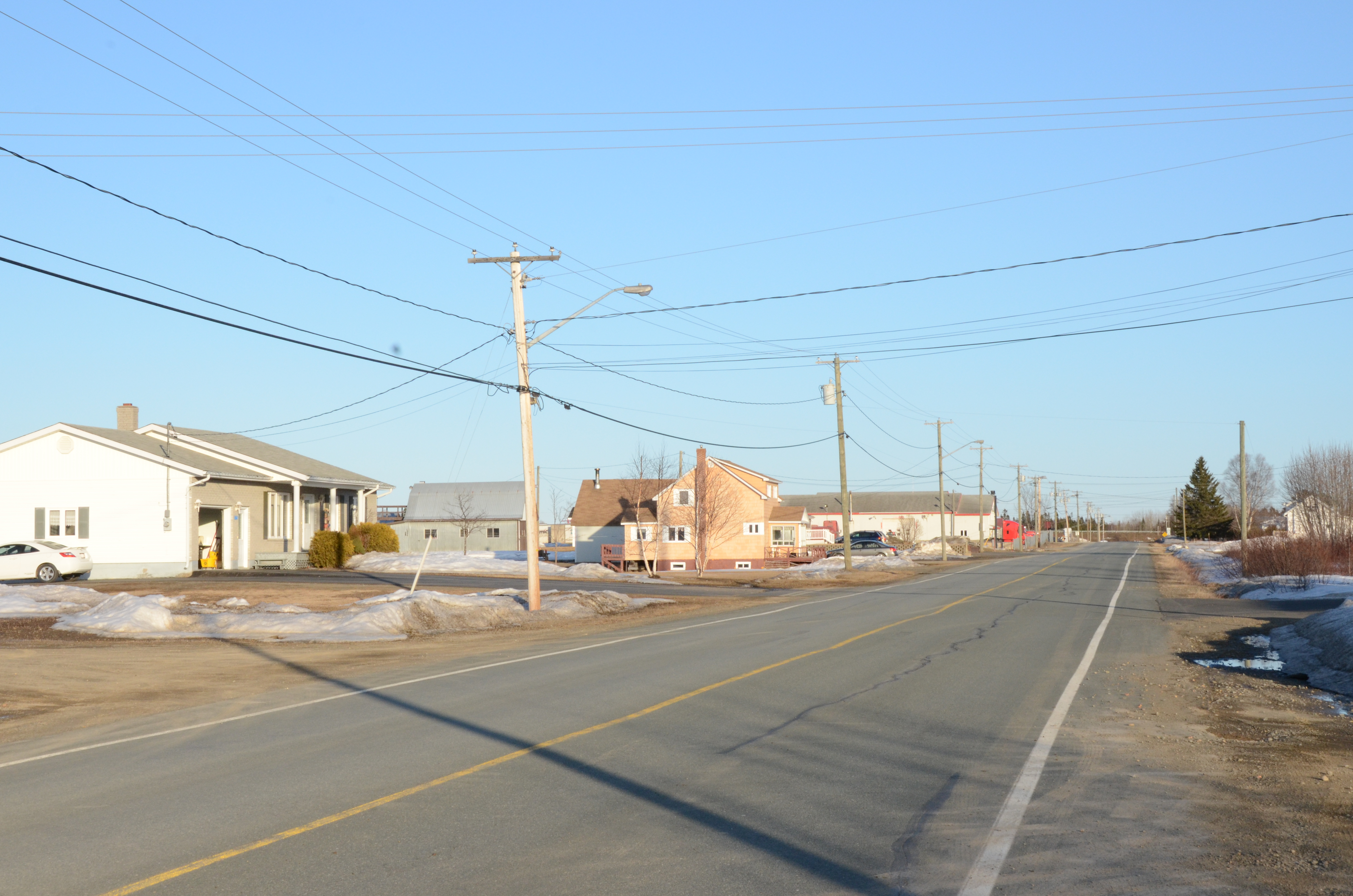
- Eel River Crossing in 2013

- Seal

- Location within New Brunswick.
- Coordinates: 48.0125°N 66.420833°W
- Country: Canada
- Province: New Brunswick
- County: Restigouche
- Parish: Dalhousie
- Village: Bois-Joli
- Founded: 1875
- Incorporated: November 9, 1966
- Electoral Districts Federal: Madawaska—Restigouche
- Provincial: Dalhousie-Restigouche East

Area
  - Land: 65.26 km^{2} (25.20 sq mi)

Population (2021)
  - Total: 1,844
  - Density: 28.3/km^{2} (73/sq mi)
  - Change 2016–21: ▼5.6%
  - Dwellings: 887
- Time zone: UTC-4 (AST)
  - Summer (DST): UTC-3 (ADT)
- Postal code(s): E8E: 1N5-1N9, 1P1-1P9, 1R1-1R9; 1S1-1S9, 1T1-1T9, 1V1-1V5; 2L7, 2W9
- Area code: 506
- Highways Route 11: Route 275; Route 280
- Median Income*: $42,411 CDN
- Website: www.ercvillage.com

Eel River Crossing is a community in Bois-Joli in Restigouche County, New Brunswick, Canada. It held village status until 2023, when it was amalgamated to form the village of Bois-Joli. The Eel River Bar First Nation is nearby.

== History ==
Its name usually being simplified to Eel River, the village is situated on the river of that name. The word "Crossing" was added to the name after the Intercolonial Railway built its Halifax-Rivière-du-Loup main line through the community in 1875. Since 1972, a high-voltage converter station, the Eel River Converter Station, is located in Eel River Crossing.

Eel River (Chaleur Bay) – A descriptive derived from the French designation Anguille. Anse a l'Anguille changed to Eel River Cove by petition on October 14, 1950.

In Mi'kmaq, Eel River was known as Okpĕgŭnchĭk which meant "discoloured foam on the water".

Following an amalgamation with surrounding areas in 2015, the village branded itself Eel River Dundee in 2018 but the legal name remained Eel River Crossing.

On January 1, 2023, Eel River Crossing amalgamated with the village of Balmoral and all or part of five local service districts to form the new village of Bois-Joli. The community's name remains in official use.

== Demographics ==
In the 2021 Census of Population conducted by Statistics Canada, Eel River Crossing had a population of 1,844 living in 839 of its 887 total private dwellings, a change of −5.6% from its 2016 population of 1,953. With a land area of 65.26 km^{2} (25.20 sq mi), it had a population density of 28.3/km^{2} (73.2/sq mi) in 2021.

In the same census, the designated place portion of Eel River Crossing had a population of 1,082 living in 504 of its 531 total private dwellings, a change of −6.5% from its 2016 population of 1,157. With a land area of 18.92 km^{2} (7.31 sq mi), it had a population density of 57.2/km^{2} (148.1/sq mi) in 2021.

Population trend

Census	Population	Change (%)
2016	1,953	▼3.9%
2011 revised	2,032	▲40.5%
2011	1,209	▲3.5%
2006	1,168	▼12.5%
2001	1,335	▼7.7%
1996	1,446	▼1.4%
1991	1,467	N/A

- 2011 population revised due to boundary changes.

Mother tongue (2016)

Language	Population	Pct (%)
French only	1,575	81.8%
English only	310	16.1%
Both English and French	30	1.6%
Other languages	10	0.5%

== See also ==
- List of communities in New Brunswick
