= Eel River Bar First Nation =

Eel River Bar Ugpi'ganjig
- Eel River Bar First Nation
- Location within New Brunswick
- Coordinates: 48.035290°N 66.374315°W
- Country: Canada
- Province: New Brunswick
- County: Restigouche
- Parish: Dalhousie
- Electoral Districts Federal: Madawaska—Restigouche
- Provincial: Campbellton-Dalhousie

Area
  - Land: 5.72 km^{2} (2.21 sq mi)

Population (2016)
  - Total: 415
  - Density: 72.55/km^{2} (187.9/sq mi)
  - Dwellings: 180
- Time zone: UTC-4 (AST)
  - Summer (DST): UTC-3 (ADT)
- Area code: 506
- Access Routes Route 11: Route 134
- Website: http://www.ugpi-ganjig.ca/

Eel River Bar First Nation (Mi'kmaq: Ugpi'ganjig) is a Miꞌkmaq First Nation located in Northern New Brunswick. It has a registered population of 757 people, of which 346 live on reserve. The total number of people living on the reserve is 415 as of 2016. Eel River Bar First Nation has three reserves: Eel River 3, Indian Ranch, and Moose Meadows 4.

== Location ==
Eel River Bar is situated on the Bay of Chaleur at the mouth of the Eel River, in Northern New Brunswick. It is approximately 3 km from Dalhousie, and about 20 km from Campbellton, the nearest city. Route 11 is the nearest highway, and Route 134 is a secondary road running through the community.

== History ==
In September 2026, the band was listed as a 10% investor in the torrefied wood pellet production facility that will accompany the switch away from coal for the Belledune Generating Station.
