= Clair, New Brunswick =

Clair
- Village
- Flag
- Motto: "Quousque Possumus"
- Location of Clair, New Brunswick
- Coordinates: 47.2525°N 68.605°W
- Country: Canada
- Province: New Brunswick
- County: Madawaska
- Parish: Clair
- Village Status: 1966
- Electoral Districts Federal: Madawaska—Restigouche
- Provincial: Madawaska-les-Lacs

Government
  - Type: Village Council
  - Mayor: Pierre Michaud
  - Councillors: List of Members: Patrick P. Long; Marc R. Long; Carl Sawyer

Area
  - Total: 10.61 km^{2} (4.10 sq mi)

Population (2016)
  - Total: 781
  - Density: 73.6/km^{2} (191/sq mi)
  - Change 2011-16: ▼8.9%
- Time zone: UTC-4 (AST)
  - Summer (DST): UTC-3 (ADT)
- Area code: 506
- Dwellings: 409
- Median Household Income*: $44,544 CDN
- Access Routes: Route 161; Route 205
- Median household income, 2015 (all households)

Clair (2016 population: 781) is a former Canadian village in Madawaska County, New Brunswick, now part of Haut-Madawaska.

== History ==
Situated on the Saint John River opposite Fort Kent, Maine. The name Clair finds its roots in the community named for County Clare in Ireland. The name of the village is the result of the railroad station being located near the General store of James T. Clair. The station was called Clair's and was a regular stop of the Temiscouata Railway on its way up to the Connors station. Over time, the name stuck and was shortened to the family name of Clair. The original name of the location was actually "La Petite Décharge" named after the discharge of the small "ruisseau des Lang" into the Saint John River.

In a 2016 plebiscite, the residents of five local service districts (the parishes of Baker Brook, Clair, Lac Baker, Saint-François, and Saint-Hilaire), part of a sixth local service district (the parish of Madawaska) and four villages (Baker Brook, Clair, Saint-François de Madawaska and Saint-Hilaire) voted 493 to 299 in favour of incorporating a new rural community under the name of Haut-Madawaska. The incorporation took effect July 1, 2017.

Forestry is the basis of the local economy.

The Clair – Fort Kent Bridge crosses the International Boundary to link both communities.

== Demographics ==
In the 2021 Census of Population conducted by Statistics Canada, Clair had a population of 794 living in 392 of its 405 total private dwellings, a change of 1.7% from its 2016 population of 781. With a land area of 10.49 km^{2} (4.05 sq mi), it had a population density of 75.7/km^{2} (196.0/sq mi) in 2021.

Population trend

Census	Population	Change (%)
2016	781	▼8.9%
2011	857	▲1.1%
2006	848	▼1.7%
2001	863	▼4.6%
1996	905	▲0.2%
1991	903	N/A

Mother tongue language (2016)

Language	Population	Pct (%)
French only	705	90.4%
English only	70	9.0%
Other languages	0	0%
Both English and French	5	0.6%

== Attractions ==
The local Roman Catholic church houses noted religious artwork, including stained-glass windows from the workshop of Belgian artist José Gaterrath and the Stations of the Cross by the famous Spanish ceramist Jordi Bonet.

== See also ==
- List of communities in New Brunswick
