= Haut-Madawaska =

- Town
- Location within New Brunswick.
- Coordinates: 47.308°N 68.497°W
- Country: Canada
- Province: New Brunswick
- County: Madawaska
- Rural community: July 1, 2017
- Town: January 1, 2023

Government
  - Mayor: Nancy Ann Landry

Area
  - Land: 611.55 km^{2} (236.12 sq mi)

Population (2021)
  - Total: 3,720
  - Density: 6.1/km^{2} (16/sq mi)
  - Change (2016–21): ▲0.2%
- Time zone: UTC-4 (AST)
  - Summer (DST): UTC-3 (ADT)
- Website: haut-madawaska.com

Haut-Madawaska is a town in the New Brunswick Panhandle, Canada, formed by amalgamating the previous incorporated rural community of the same name with the village of Lac Baker. The town includes the former incorporated villages of Lac Baker, Baker-Brook, Clair, Saint-François-de-Madawaska and Saint-Hilaire.

Revised census figures for the new town have not been released; 2021 figures are for the rural community.

== History ==
Boundaries of Haut-Madawaska as of January 1, 2023.

In a 2016 plebiscite, the residents of five local service districts (the parishes of Baker Brook, Clair, Lac Baker, Saint-François, and Saint-Hilaire), part of a sixth local service district (the parish of Madawaska) and four villages (Baker Brook, Clair, Saint-François de Madawaska and Saint-Hilaire) voted 493 to 299 in favour of incorporating a new rural community under the name of Haut-Madawaska. The incorporation took effect July 1, 2017. The plebiscite was the second in as many years. In 2015, a similar plebiscite was held that also included a fifth village, Lac Baker. The residents of all communities involved voted in favour of incorporation as a rural community with the exception of Lac Baker's residents, thereby defeating the proposal. As a result of the 2023 New Brunswick local governance reform, Lac Baker was amalgamated with the rest of Haut-Madawaska in 2023.

== Economy ==
Lac Baker

The region's economy is focused on two industry sectors with some of the main players outlined below:

1) Food industry (Saint-François-de-Madawaska is known as the province's Chicken Capital)

- Groupe Westco (an integrated poultry
- Nadeau Poultry (a poultry processing plant, part of the Maple Lodge Farms company)
- Sunnymel (a poultry processing plant, partnership between Groupe Westco and Olymel)
- Les Industries Corriveau (a processing plant for buckwheat flour)

2) Wood products (part of the Northern New Brunswick wood products cluster)

- JD Irving Hardwoods (a hardwood grading and kiln drying facility, part of the JD Irving Group)
- Waska (a manufacturer of cedar shingles)
- JMN Enterprises (a manufacturer of kitchen accessories, BBQ accessories, and hardwood components)
- Fiready (a manufacturer of kiln dried firewood)
- Canusa Cedar (a manufacturer of cedar shingles)

The region is known for its hardworking labor and close to full employment with recurring periods of zero or negative unemployment.

== Demographics ==
In the 2021 Census of Population conducted by Statistics Canada, Haut-Madawaska had a population of 3,720 living in 1,658 of its 1,781 total private dwellings, a change of 0.2% from its 2016 population of 3,714. With a land area of 611.55 km^{2} (236.12 sq mi), it had a population density of 6.1/km^{2} (15.8/sq mi) in 2021.

Haut-Madawaska population breakdown
Former municipality or local service district	Former status	Population (2016)
Baker Brook	Parish	275
Baker Brook	Village	564
Clair	Parish	283
Clair	Village	781
Lac Baker	Parish	5
Saint-François	Parish	606
Saint-François-de-Madawaska	Village	470
Saint-Hilaire	Parish	478
Saint-Hilaire	Village	252
Total population	—	3,714

== Government ==
The current mayor is Jean-Pierre Ouellet (a former minister in the provincial government).

== See also ==
- List of communities in New Brunswick
- List of municipalities in New Brunswick
