= Saint-Hilaire, New Brunswick =

Saint-Hilaire St. Hilaire
- Village
- Location within New Brunswick.
- Coordinates: 47.2925°N 68.3925°W
- Country: Canada
- Province: New Brunswick
- County: Madawaska
- Parish: Saint-Hilaire
- Village Status: 1967
- Electoral Districts Federal: Madawaska—Restigouche
- Provincial: Madawaska-les-Lacs

Government
  - Type: Village Council
  - Mayor: Roland Dubé
  - Councillors: List of Members: Josée Levesque; Rino Morneault

Area
  - Total: 5.68 km^{2} (2.19 sq mi)

Population (2016)
  - Total: 252
  - Density: 44.4/km^{2} (115/sq mi)
  - Change 2011-2016: ▼16.8%
  - Dwellings: 101
- Time zone: UTC-4 (AST)
  - Summer (DST): UTC-3 (ADT)
- Area code: 506
- Access Routes: Route 120

Saint-Hilaire (2016 population: 252) is a former village in Madawaska County, New Brunswick, Canada. It is now part of Haut-Madawaska.

The legal spelling of the name was St. Hilaire but this was used only sporadically by the provincial government.

The largest employer is a composting plant.

== History ==
The municipality was constituted on 2 October 1967. It consists of a mayor and three councillors.

== Geography ==
The Saint John river valley is cut between two sets of peaks. The town is roughly 200m above sea level, while a peak of roughly 1000m is seen nearby. Frenchville, Maine is across the river. The steel truss Clair – Fort Kent Bridge is upriver about five miles, while downstream the next border crossing is the Edmundston–Madawaska Bridge (also a steel truss).

== Economy ==
The nearest post office is upriver in Baker Brook. A railway and NB Route 120 go through town, as well as the Saint John River. The elementary school closed in 1996 due to lack of students. The Caisse Populaire Trois-Rives maintains a branch. The nearest Royal Canadian Mounted Police detachment is in Clair, New Brunswick, while the nearest hospital is located in Edmundston.

== Demographics ==
In the 2021 Census of Population conducted by Statistics Canada, Saint-Hilaire had a population of 273 living in 93 of its 102 total private dwellings, a change of 8.3% from its 2016 population of 252. With a land area of 5.69 km^{2} (2.20 sq mi), it had a population density of 48.0/km^{2} (124.3/sq mi) in 2021.

Canada census – Saint-Hilaire, New Brunswick community profile

	2016	2011
Population	252 (-16.8% from 2011)	303 (+31.2% from 2006)
Land area	5.68 km^{2} (2.19 sq mi)	5.67 km^{2} (2.19 sq mi)
Population density	44.4/km^{2} (115/sq mi)	53.4/km^{2} (138/sq mi)
Median age	37.6 (M: 38.5, F: 36.5)	35.7 (M: 35.6, F: 36.0)
Private dwellings	101 (total)	96 (total)
Median household income	$63,360	$.N/A

Notes: Income data for this area has been suppressed for data quality or confidentiality reasons.
References: 2016 2011

Historical Census Data - Saint-Hilaire, New Brunswick

Year	Pop.	±%
1991	273	—
1996	255	−6.6%

Year	Pop.	±%
2001	237	−7.1%
2006	231	−2.5%

Year	Pop.	±%
2011	303	+31.2%
2016	252	−16.8%

=== Language ===
Canada Census Mother Tongue - Saint-Hilaire, New Brunswick 2011 language data for this area has been suppressed for data quality or confidentiality reasons.
Census	Total	French			English			French & English			Other		
Year	Responses	Count	Trend	Pop %	Count	Trend	Pop %	Count	Trend	Pop %	Count	Trend	Pop %
2016	240	235		95.92%	5		2.04%	0	Steady	0.00%	5		2.04%
2011	n/a	n/a	0.0%	0.00%	n/a	0.0%	0.00%	n/a	0.0%	0.00%	n/a	0.0%	0.00%
2006	250	250	▲16.3%	100.00%	0	▼100.0%	0.00%	0	▼100.0%	0.00%	0	0.0%	0.00%
2001	235	215	▼10.4%	91.49%	10	▲ n/a%	4.26%	10	0.0%	4.26%	0	0.0%	0.00%
1996	250	240	n/a	96.00%	0	n/a	0.00%	10	n/a	4.00%	0	n/a	0.00%

== See also ==
- List of communities in New Brunswick
- List of crossings of the Saint John River
