= Saint-Joseph Parish =

Saint-Joseph
- Parish
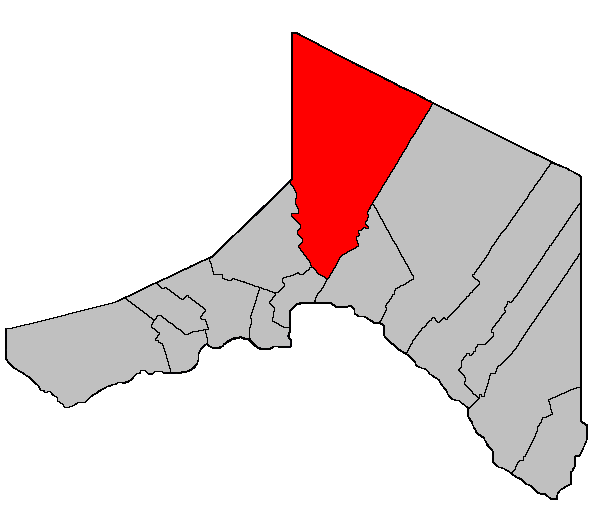
- Location within Madawaska County map erroneously includes northeastern portions of Madawaska and Saint-Jacques Parishes in Saint-Joseph
- Coordinates: 47.5425°N 68.305°W
- Country: Canada
- Province: New Brunswick
- County: Madawaska
- Erected: 1930

Area
  - Land: 321.42 km^{2} (124.10 sq mi)

Population (2021)
  - Total: 1,549
  - Density: 4.8/km^{2} (12/sq mi)
  - Change 2016-2021: ▲0.7%
  - Dwellings: 723
- Time zone: UTC-4 (AST)
  - Summer (DST): UTC-3 (ADT)

Saint-Joseph is a geographic parish in Madawaska County, New Brunswick, Canada. (Note: The Territorial Division Act divides the province into 152 parishes, the cities of Saint John and Fredericton, and one town of Grand Falls. The Interpretation Act clarifies that parishes include any local government within their borders.)

For governance purposes it is divided between the city of Edmundston and the Northwest rural district, both members of the Northwest Regional Service Commission (NWRSC). Before the 2023 governance reforms, the local service district of the parish of Saint-Joseph shared the parish's boundaries.

Saint-Joseph bisects Madawaska and Saint-Jacques Parishes, the only area in the province where parishes are discontiguous.

== Origin of name ==
The parish probably takes its name from the Roman Catholic ecclesiastical parish.

== History ==
Saint-Joseph was erected in 1930 from Madawaska and Saint-Jacques Parishes; the name was spelt without a hyphen.

Saint-Joseph was affected by the major reorganisation of Madawaska County parish boundaries.

In 1973 the hyphen was added to the legal name of the parish.

== Boundaries ==
Saint-Joseph Parish is bounded:

- on the east by a line beginning on the Quebec border at the upper end of Third Lake, then downstream following the Lake Branch through Second Lake and First Lake to its confluence with the Green River, (Note: The English name Green River and the French name Rivière Verte are both official.) then down Green River into Étang Deuxième-Sault, then westerly to a point in the Étang about 750 metres east of its western end, then southerly along the eastern line of a grant to Octave Therriault to its southeastern corner, then westerly to Green River, then down Green River to a tier of grants on the western side of Green River;
- on the southeast by a line beginning in Green River on the prolongation of the northwestern line of a tier of grants on the western side of the river, then southwesterly along the tier, passing south of Old Power Road, and its prolongation into Tier Six of the Theriault Settlement to meet the prolongation of the southeastern line of a grant to Luc Plourde in Tier Five of Theriault Settlement, about 900 metres south-southeasterly of the junction of Chemin du Pouvoir (Note: WP:ENG is ignored when it would result in a clumsy construction.) and Deuxième-Sault Road, then southwesterly along the prolongation and the Plourde grant to its southernmost corner, then southeasterly along the northeastern line of a grant to Joseph Mignois in Tier Four to its easternmost corner, then southwesterly along the southeastern line of the Mignois grant and the southeastern line of five grants in Tier Three and Francoeur to meet the northeastern line of Tier One of Theriault Settlement in Saint-Basile Parish about 700 metres northeast of Titus Road, then northwesterly about 75 metres and southwesterly about 150 metres to the southernmost corner of a grant to Baptiste Bouchard, about 500 metres northeast of Titus Road;
- on the southwest and west by a line, running mainly along grant lines, beginning at the southernmost corner of the Bouchard grant, then northwesterly along southwestern line of the Bouchard grant and a grant to Alexandre Marquis, crossing Titus Road, to strike the southeastern line of a grant to Joseph Martin Jr., then southwesterly to the Iroquois River, then upriver to about 150 metres past the bridge to the southeastern line of a grant to Cyprien Michaud on the eastern side of the Madawaska River, then northeasterly to the rear of the Michaud grant, then northwesterly along the rear line of the Madawaska River grants to the junction of St. Onge Road and Saint-Joseph Road, then northeasterly to the northeastern line of Tier Two of Plourde Settlement, which straddles the Saint-Michel Road, then northwesterly to the southeastern line of a grant about 150 metres past the NB Power transmission line, then northeasterly to the northeastern line of Tier Three of Plourde Settlement, then northwesterly along the rear line of grants straddling the Iroquois Road in Tier Three and the Sweeney Settlement until it crosses Iroquois Road west of its junction with Chemin Rang 8, then northwesterly along the eastern line of the Sweeney Settlement grants to the provincial border, then northeasterly and northerly along the border to the starting point.

== Communities ==
Communities at least partly within the parish. italics indicates a name no longer in official use

- Ciquart
- Deuxième-Sault
- Francoeur
- Halfway Depot
- Levesque
- Rang-des-Bossé
- Rang-des-Couturier
- Saint-Joseph-de-Madawaska
- Sicard
- Violette

== Bodies of water ==
Bodies of water (Note: Not including brooks, ponds or coves.) at least partly in the parish.

- Green River (French Rivière Verte)
- Iroquois River
- Little Iroquois River
- Lake Branch
- First Lake
- Second Lake
- Third Lake

== Other notable places ==
Parks, historic sites, and other noteworthy places at least partly in the parish.

- Green River North Protected Natural Area

== Demographics ==
=== Population ===
Canada census – Saint-Joseph community profile

	2021	2016	2011
Population	1,549 (+0.7% from 2016)	1,538 (-29.2% from 2011)	2,171 (+28.0% from 2006)
Land area	321.42 km^{2} (124.10 sq mi)	322.89 km^{2} (124.67 sq mi)	322.89 km^{2} (124.67 sq mi)
Population density	4.8/km^{2} (12/sq mi)	4.8/km^{2} (12/sq mi)	6.7/km^{2} (17/sq mi)
Median age	48.8 (M: 49.6, F: 48.4)	46.8 (M: 47.2, F: 46.2)	42.3 (M: 42.3, F: 42.5)
Private dwellings	675 (total)	715 (total)	917 (total)
Median household income		$60,544	$59,524

References: 2021 2016 2011

Historical Census Data - Saint-Joseph Parish, New Brunswick

Year	Pop.	±%
1991	1,692	—
1996	1,716	+1.4%

Year	Pop.	±%
2001	1,717	+0.1%
2006	1,696	−1.2%

Year	Pop.	±%
2011	2,171	+28.0%
2016	1,538	−29.2%

=== Language ===
Canada Census Mother Tongue - Saint-Joseph Parish, New Brunswick
Census	Total	French			English			French & English			Other		
Year	Responses	Count	Trend	Pop %	Count	Trend	Pop %	Count	Trend	Pop %	Count	Trend	Pop %
2016	1,525	1,475		96.7%	40		2.6%	5		0.3%	5		0.3%
2011	2,165	2,090	▲29.8%	96.54%	60	▲9.1%	2.77%	10	▲ n/a%	0.46%	5	▲ n/a%	0.23%
2006	1,665	1,610	▼3.3%	96.70%	55	▲83.3%	3.30%	0	▼100.0%	0.00%	0	0.0%	0.00%
2001	1,705	1,665	▲2.5%	97.65%	30	▼62.5%	1.76%	10	▲ n/a%	0.59%	0	▼100.0%	0.00%
1996	1,715	1,625	n/a	94.75%	80	n/a	4.66%	0	n/a	0.00%	10	n/a	0.58%

== See also ==
- List of parishes in New Brunswick
