= Clair Parish =

Clair
- Parish
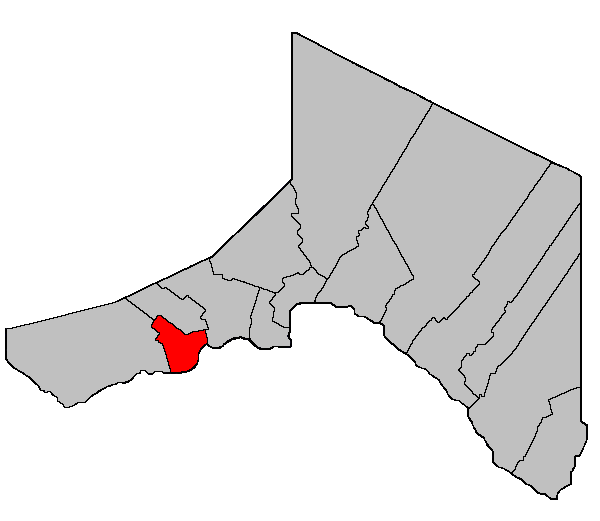
- Location within Madawaska County.
- Coordinates: 47.295°N 68.67°W
- Country: Canada
- Province: New Brunswick
- County: Madawaska
- Erected: 1900

Area
  - Land: 43.92 km^{2} (16.96 sq mi)

Population (2016)
  - Total: 283
  - Density: 6.4/km^{2} (17/sq mi)
  - Change 2011-2016: ▼4.7%
  - Dwellings: 101
- Time zone: UTC-4 (AST)
  - Summer (DST): UTC-3 (ADT)
- Figures do not include portion within village of Clair; No census data available after 2016

Clair is a geographic parish in Madawaska County, New Brunswick, Canada.

For governance purposes it is part of the incorporated rural community of Haut-Madawaska, which is a member of the Northwest Regional Service Commission (NWRSC).

== Origin of name ==
Clair was named in honour of Peter Clair, an early immigrant from County Clare, Ireland.

== History ==
Clair was erected in 1900 from Saint-François.

In 1912 Lac Baker Parish was erected from part of Clair; the boundary was slightly altered later that year.

Clair was affected by the major reorganisation of Madawaska County parish boundaries in 1946.

== Boundaries ==
Clair Parish is bounded:

- on the northeast and north, running entirely along grant lines, starting at a point about 1.35 kilometres northwest of Chemin des Long, (Note: WP:ENG is ignored when it would result in a clumsy construction.) on the northeastern line of Range Three of the Baker Lake Settlement, which is two tiers inland of the western side of Lac Baker, then running southeasterly to the northwestern corner of a triangular grant on Brown Road, then easterly and northeasterly along two Brown Road grants, then easterly along the Saint John River grants to a point about 1.2 kilometres east of Route 120;
- on the east by the eastern line of a grant to John C. Ouellet and its prolongation to the international border in the Saint John River;
- on the south by the international border;
- on the west and northwest by a line beginning in the Saint John River on the prolongation of the western line of a grant to Edward Levasseur in Range Two, the Levasseur lot being on the western side of Levasseur Road at its northern end, then northerly along the prolongation through Range One (the river grants), the grant line, and the northerly prolongation to the northern line of Range Three, afterwards running entirely on grant lines, westerly along Range 3 to the southwestern line of Range Five of Baker Lake Settlement, then northwesterly along Range Five about 1.3 kilometres, then northeasterly to the southwestern line of Range Four, then northwesterly along Range Four about 2 kilometres, then northeasterly across Range Four and Range Three to the starting point.

== Communities ==
Communities at least partly within the parish; bold indicates an incorporated municipality; italics indicate a name no longer in official use

- Caron Brook
- **Clair**
  - Concession-des-Vasseur
- Concession-des-Lang
- Crockett
- Les Rapides

== Bodies of water ==
Bodies of water (Note: Not including brooks, ponds or coves.) at least partly in the parish:

- Saint John River
- Thompson Lake

== Demographics ==
Parish population total does not include former village of Clair. 2016 is the last census the parish was profiled in. Revised census figures based on the 2023 local governance reforms have not been released.

=== Population ===
Canada census – Clair Parish community profile

	2016	2011
Population	283 (-4.7% from 2011)	297 (+5.3% from 2006)
Land area	43.92 km^{2} (16.96 sq mi)	44.18 km^{2} (17.06 sq mi)
Population density	6.4/km^{2} (17/sq mi)	6.7/km^{2} (17/sq mi)
Median age	51.1 (M: 52.0, F: 50.2)	50.1 (M: 50.0, F: 50.2)
Private dwellings	101 (total)	121 (total)
Median household income	$65,088	$102,983

References: 2016 2011

Historical Census Data - Clair Parish, New Brunswick

Year	Pop.	±%
1991	295	—
1996	306	+3.7%

Year	Pop.	±%
2001	289	−5.6%
2006	282	−2.4%

Year	Pop.	±%
2011	297	+5.3%
2016	283	−4.7%

=== Language ===
Canada Census Mother Tongue - Clair Parish, New Brunswick
Census	Total	French			English			French & English			Other		
Year	Responses	Count	Trend	Pop %	Count	Trend	Pop %	Count	Trend	Pop %	Count	Trend	Pop %
2016	270	245		90.7%	20		7.4%	5		1.9%	0	Steady	0%
2011	280	250	▲12.0%	89.29%	25	▼50.0%	8.93%	5	▼66.7%	1.78%	0	0.0%	0.00%
2006	285	220	▼18.5%	77.19%	50	▲80.0%	17.54%	15	▲33.3%	5.26%	0	0.0%	0.00%
2001	290	270	▼8.5%	93.10%	10	▼33.3%	3.45%	10	▲ n/a%	3.45%	0	0.0%	0.00%
1996	310	295	n/a	95.16%	15	n/a	4.84%	0	n/a	0.00%	0	n/a	0.00%

== See also ==
- List of parishes in New Brunswick
