= Madawaska Parish =

Parish in New Brunswick, Canada

Madawaska
- Parish
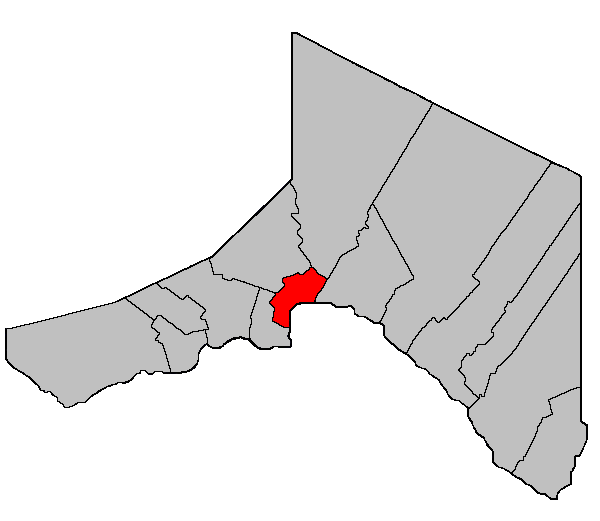
- Location within Madawaska County. Map is missing northeastern portion of parish.
- Coordinates: 47.37°N 68.33°W
- Country: Canada
- Province: New Brunswick
- County: Madawaska
- Erected: 1833

Area
  - Land: 173.42 km^{2} (66.96 sq mi)

Population (2021)
  - Total: 0
  - Density: 0/km^{2} (0/sq mi)
  - Change 2016-2021: ▼100.0%
  - Dwellings: 0
- Time zone: UTC-4 (AST)
  - Summer (DST): UTC-3 (ADT)
- Figures do not include portions within the city of Edmundston and the rural community of Haut-Madawaska

Madawaska is a geographic parish in Madawaska County, New Brunswick, Canada. (Note: The Territorial Division Act divides the province into 152 parishes, the cities of Saint John and Fredericton, and one town of Grand Falls. The Interpretation Act clarifies that parishes include any local government within their borders.)

The parish consists of two discontiguous portions, separated by Saint-Joseph Parish. For governance purposes, the southwestern portion is divided between the city of Edmundston and the town of Haut-Madawaska; the northeastern portion is part of the Northwest rural district. All three bodies are part of the Northwest Regional Service Commission.

Before the 2023 governance reform, the northeastern portion of the parish formed the local service district of the parish of Madawaska.

== Origin of name ==
The parish was named for the Madawaska River.

== History ==
Madawaska was erected in 1833 from the northern part of Kent Parish, taking in most of modern Madawaska County and the northern part of Victoria County.

In 1850 three new parishes were erected from Madawaska: Saint-Basile, Saint-François, and Saint-Léonard.

In 1852 the parish was extended northward to include territory awarded in the boundary settlement with Lower Canada, losing some area to Restigouche County in the process.

In 1874 the centre of modern Edmundston was added to Madawaska from Saint-Basile.

In 1877 Saint-Jacques Parish was erected from Madawaska and Saint-Hilaire Parish also included part of Madawaska.

In 1930 Saint-Joseph Parish included part of Madawaska.

In 1946 Madawaska was affected by the major reorganisation of Madawaska County parish boundaries.

== Boundaries ==
Madawaska Parish comprises two discontiguous portions: the heavily populated southwestern portion and the interior northeastern portion, which lacks provincial roads.

The southwestern portion is bounded:

- on the north, running entirely along grant lines, beginning at a point on Farline Road about 2.4 kilometres west-southwesterly of Route 2, the western point of a grant to Peter St. Ange in Tier One of Trout Brook Settlement, then running easterly and northeasterly along the northern line of the St. Ange grant to the Madawaska River, then downstream about a kilometre to the westernmost corner of a grant to Olivier Boucher, then northeasterly along the northwestern line of the Boucher grant to the Iroquois River;
- on the east and southeast, beginning on the northwestern line of the Boucher grant and running down the Iroquois River about 2.1 kilometres to strike the northwestern line of a grant to Prospère Leveque, then northeasterly to the northernmost corner of the Leveque grant, then southeasterly along the northeastern line of Leveque and a grant to Denis Cyr to the easternmost corner of Cyr, about 550 metres northeast of Titus Road, then southwesterly in a straight line along the southeastern line of various grants to strike the international border in the Saint John River, passing between and roughly parallelling Saint-Louis and Irène Streets near the river;
- on the south, by the international border in the Saint John River, running upstream to a point about 2.6 kilometres east-southeast of the junction of Alcide Collin Road and Riceville Road, then west-northwesterly along the southern line of a grant to Alexander Ouellett Jr. to the junction, which is on the rear line of grants on the Saint John;
- on the west and northwest, running entirely along grant lines, northerly along the rear line of Saint John River grants about 1.45 kilometres to the southernmost corner of a tier of grants at the rear of the river lots, then northwesterly crossing Gabourie Road to the rear of the tier, then northeasterly, crossing Guerrette, Trois-Milles, and Farline Roads, to the western line of Tier One of Trout Brook Settlement, about 300 metres beyond Farline Road, then northwesterly about 1.2 kilometres along Tier One to the starting point.

The northeastern portion is bounded:

- on the northeast by the Restigouche County line;
- on the southeast by the prolongation of the line that forms the southeastern boundary of the southwestern portion of the parish, running southwesterly from the county line to the Green River; (Note: The English name Green River and the French name Rivière Verte are both official.)
- on the west by Green River.

== Communities ==
Communities at least partly within the parish. bold indicates an incorporated municipality or incorporated rural community

- **Edmundston**
  - Boucher
  - Côte à Blanchette
  - Saint-Basile
  - Saint-Jacques
  - Verret
- **Haut-Madawaska**

== Bodies of water ==
Bodies of water (Note: Not including brooks, ponds or coves.) at least partly in the parish.

- Rivière à la Truite
- Green River (French Rivière Verte)
- Iroquois River
- Madawaska River
- Saint John River
- Lake Branch

== Other notable places ==
Parks, historic sites, and other noteworthy places at least partly in the parish.

- Moose Valley Hill Protected Natural Area
- République Provincial Park

== Demographics ==
Parish population total does not include portion in city of Edmundston

=== Population ===
Historical Census Data - Madawaska Parish, New Brunswick

| Year | Pop. | ±% |
|---|---|---|
| 1991 | 154 | — |
| 1996 | 160 | +3.9% |

| Year | Pop. | ±% |
|---|---|---|
| 2001 | 0 | −100.0% |
| 2006 | 10 | — |

| Year | Pop. | ±% |
|---|---|---|
| 2011 | 0 | −100.0% |
| 2016 | 10 | — |

=== Language ===
Canada Census Mother Tongue - Madawaska Parish, New Brunswick
| Census | Total | French | | | English | | | French & English | | | Other | | |
| Year | Responses | Count | Trend | Pop % | Count | Trend | Pop % | Count | Trend | Pop % | Count | Trend | Pop % |
| 2011 | 0 | 0 | 0.0% | 0.00% | 0 | 0.0% | 0.00% | 0 | 0.0% | 0.00% | 0 | 0.0% | 0.00% |
| 2006 | 0 | 0 | 0.0% | 0.00% | 0 | 0.0% | 0.00% | 0 | 0.0% | 0.00% | 0 | 0.0% | 0.00% |
| 2001 | 0 | 0 | ▼100.0% | 0.00% | 0 | ▼100.0% | 0.00% | 0 | 0.0% | 0.00% | 0 | 0.0% | 0.00% |
| 1996 | 130 | 120 | n/a | 92.31% | 10 | n/a | 7.69% | 0 | n/a | 0.00% | 0 | n/a | 0.00% |

== See also ==
- List of parishes in New Brunswick
