= Lac Baker, New Brunswick =

Lac Baker
- Aerial view of Lake Baker

- Location of Lac Baker, New Brunswick
- Coordinates: 47.335°N 68.64°W
- Country: Canada
- Province: New Brunswick
- County: Madawaska
- Parish: Lac Baker
- Town: Haut-Madawaska
- Incorporated: 1967
- Electoral Districts Federal: Madawaska—Restigouche
- Provincial: Madawaska-les-Lacs

Area
  - Land: 37.24 km^{2} (14.38 sq mi)

Population (2021)
  - Total: 685
  - Density: 18.4/km^{2} (48/sq mi)
  - Change (2016–21): ▼0.7%
- Time zone: UTC-4 (AST)
  - Summer (DST): UTC-3 (ADT)
- Area code: 506
- Dwellings: 505
- Median Household Income*: $54,443 CDN
- Access Routes: Route 120
- Median household income, 2015 (all households)

Lac Baker is a Canadian community in Madawaska County, New Brunswick, formerly an incorporated village but now part of the town of Haut-Madawaska.

It is adjacent to the shore of Lake Baker, which derives its name from that of John Baker, founder of Baker Brook.

== History ==
On 1 January 2023, Lac Baker amalgamated with the rural community of Haut-Madawaska to form the new town of Haut-Madawaska. The community's name remains in official use.

== Demographics ==
In the 2021 Census of Population conducted by Statistics Canada, Lac Baker had a population of 685 living in 336 of its 459 total private dwellings, a change of −0.7% from its 2016 population of 690. With a land area of 37.24 km^{2} (14.38 sq mi), it had a population density of 18.4/km^{2} (47.6/sq mi) in 2021.

Population trend

Census	Population	Change (%)
2016	690	▼4.0 %
2011	719	▲2.0 %
2006	705 (Adjusted)	▼25.2%
2001	226	0.0%
1996	226	▼1.3%
1991	229	N/A

Mother tongue (2016)

Language	Population	Pct (%)
French only	630	92.7%
English only	35	5.1%
Both English and French	10	1.5%
Other languages	5	0.7%

== See also ==
- List of communities in New Brunswick
