= New Brunswick Route 161 =

Highway in New Brunswick, Canada

Route 161

Route information
- Maintained by New Brunswick Department of Transportation
- Length: 5.0 km (3.1 mi)
- Existed: 2001–present

Major junctions
- South end: US 1 / SR 161 at the U.S. border in Clair
- Route 205 in Clair
- North end: Route 120 in Caron Brook

Location
- Country: Canada
- Province: New Brunswick
- Major cities: Clair, Caron Brook

Highway system
- Provincial highways in New Brunswick; Former routes
← Route 160	→ Route 165

Route 161 is a New Brunswick highway that runs for 5 kilometres (3.1 mi) from a junction with Route 120 at Caron Brook, to the International Bridge at Clair; in Madawaska County. The route connects to U.S. Route 1 and Maine State Route 161 across the Saint John River in Fort Kent, Maine.

Route 161 was part of Route 205 until 1999.

== See also ==
- List of New Brunswick provincial highways
