= Baker Brook Parish =

Baker Brook
- Parish
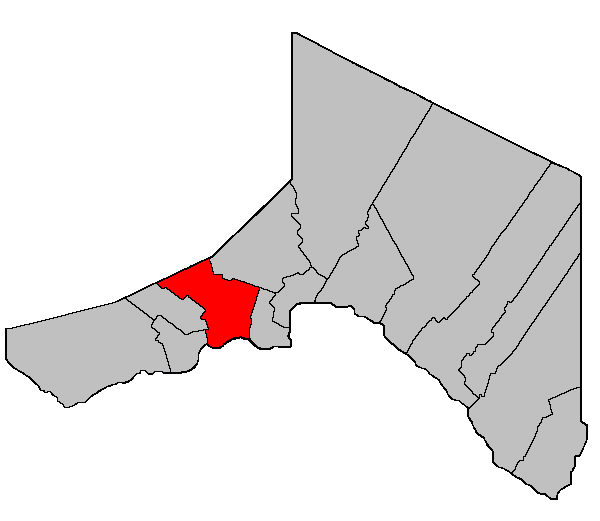
- Location within Madawaska County.
- Coordinates: 47.355°N 68.56°W
- Country: Canada
- Province: New Brunswick
- County: Madawaska
- Erected: 1930

Area
  - Land: 125.17 km^{2} (48.33 sq mi)

Population (2016)
  - Total: 275
  - Density: 2.2/km^{2} (5.7/sq mi)
  - Change 2011-2016: ▼4.2%
  - Dwellings: 137
- Time zone: UTC-4 (AST)
  - Summer (DST): UTC-3 (ADT)
- Figures do not include portion within village of Baker-Brook; No census data available after 2016

Baker Brook is a geographic parish in Madawaska County, New Brunswick, Canada.

For governance purposes it is part of the incorporated rural community of Haut-Madawaska, which is a member of the Northwest Regional Service Commission (NWRSC).

== Origin of name ==
The parish was named for Baker Brook, which took its name from John Baker, an American leader in the Aroostook War. Baker remained in the area after the boundary settlement assigned the area to New Brunswick.

== History ==
Baker Brook was erected in 1930 from Saint-Hilaire Parish.

In 1946 Baker Brook was affected by the major rewriting of Madawaska County parish boundaries.

== Boundaries ==
Baker Brook Parish is bounded:

- on the north by the Quebec provincial border;
- on the east, running entirely along land grant lines, starting at the provincial border and running southeasterly then southerly along the eastern line Tier Two of the Michaud Settlement, which straddle the Petit-Reed Road and then the Pinniquine Road, for the first sixteen grants, then easterly to the eastern line of Tier One of Michaud Settlement, then southerly along Tier One, then southeasterly along the northern line of the grant south of the junction of Sisson Road and Paradis Road to the western line of Tier Six of the Riceville Settlement, then northerly along Tier Six to its northernmost corner, then easterly along the northern line of Tier Six, which straddles Richard Road and Guerrette Road, then turning about 1.6 kilometres east of the junction of Guerrette Road and Picard Road and running southerly to the northern line of Tier Two of the Ouellette Settlement, which runs along the southern side of Saint-Germain Road, then easterly to Elias Daigle Road, then southerly to the international border in the Saint John River;
- on the south by the international border;
- on the west, running almost entirely along grant lines, beginning on the international border at the prolongation of the western line of a grant to Augustine Daigle, nearly a kilometre east of the junction of Route 120 and Route 161, then north-northeasterly and north-northwesterly to the rear line of the Saint John River grants, then easterly along the rear line of river grants to the rear line of grants on the eastern side of Caron Brook, then northerly along the rear line to northernmost corner of the ninth grant, then westerly to the northeastern line of a grant straddling Chemin du Lac, (Note: WP:ENG is ignored when it would result in a clumsy construction.) then northwesterly to Chemin du Lac, then northeasterly along the southern line of Range Four the Nadeau Settlement grants, which is inland of the grants along Lac Baker, then northwesterly along the eastern line of Range Four to a point about 550 metres southeast of Baker-Brook River, then southwesterly to the eastern line of Range Five of Nadeau Settlement, a tier of smaller grants also inland of the Lac Baker grants, then northwesterly along Range Five to its end near Baker-Brook River, then southwesterly to the rear line Lac Baker grants, then northwesterly to the provincial border.

== Communities ==
Communities at least partly within the parish. bold indicates an incorporated municipality; italics indicate a name no longer in official use

- **Baker-Brook**
  - Couturier Siding
  - Michaud
- Concession-de-Baker-Brook
- Concession-des-Ouellette
- Pinniquine
- Rang-des-Morneault
- Rang-Saint-Joseph
- Val-Lambert
- Val-Nadeau

== Bodies of water ==
Bodies of water (Note: Not including brooks, ponds or coves.) at least partly in the parish.

- Baker-Brook River
- Rivière Baker-Brook-Nord
- Saint John River
- Branche à Jerry

== Islands ==
Islands at least partly in the parish.

- Baker Island
- Daigle Island
- Fifth Island
- Third Island
- Turtle Island

== Other notable places ==
Parks, historic sites, and other noteworthy places at least partly in the parish.

- Baker Brook Protected Natural Area

== Demographics ==
Parish population total did not include former village of Baker-Brook. 2016 is the last year the parish was profiled in the census.

=== Population ===
Canada census – Baker Brook Parish community profile

	2016	2011
Population	275 (-4.2% from 2011)	287 (+62.1% from 2006)
Land area	125.17 km^{2} (48.33 sq mi)	125.48 km^{2} (48.45 sq mi)
Population density	2.2/km^{2} (5.7/sq mi)	2.3/km^{2} (6.0/sq mi)
Median age	49.8 (M: 50.0, F: 49.6)	44.9 (M: 45.4, F: 44.2)
Private dwellings	137 (total)	139 (total)
Median household income	$53,888	$62,671

Notes: 2006 income data for this area has been suppressed for data quality or confidentiality reasons.
References: 2016 2011

Historical Census Data - Baker Brook Parish, New Brunswick

Year	Pop.	±%
1991	306	—
1996	357	+16.7%

Year	Pop.	±%
2001	322	−9.8%
2006	177	−45.0%

Year	Pop.	±%
2011	287	+62.1%
2016	275	−4.2%

=== Language ===
Canada Census Mother Tongue - Baker Brook Parish, New Brunswick 2011 language data for this area has been suppressed for data quality or confidentiality reasons.
Census	Total	French			English			French & English			Other		
Year	Responses	Count	Trend	Pop %	Count	Trend	Pop %	Count	Trend	Pop %	Count	Trend	Pop %
2016	275	250		90.9%	20		7.3%	5		7.8%	0		0%
2011	0	n/a	0.0%	0.00%	n/a	0.0%	0.00%	n/a	0.0%	0.00%	n/a	0.0%	0.00%
2006	185	150	▼52.4%	81.08%	10	▲ n/a%	5.41%	10	▲ n/a%	5.41%	15	▲ n/a%	8.11%
2001	315	315	▼6.0%	100.00%	0	0.0%	0.00%	0	▼100.0%	0.00%	0	0.0%	0.00%
1996	355	335	n/a	94.37%	0	n/a	0.00%	20	n/a	5.63%	0	n/a	0.00%

== See also ==
- List of parishes in New Brunswick
