= Local service district (New Brunswick) =

Type of administrative division in Canada

A local service district (LSD) was a provincial administrative unit for the provision of local services in the Canadian province of New Brunswick. LSDs originally covered areas of the province that maintained some services but were not made municipalities when the province's former county municipalities were dissolved at the start of 1967; eventually all of rural New Brunswick (Note: Indian reserves, national parks, and CFB Gagetown were under federal jurisdiction, and some small uninhabited islands were omitted from the regulations defining LSD boundaries.) was covered by the LSD system. They were defined in law by the Local Service Districts Regulation of the Municipalities Act. In 2017, the Municipalities Act was replaced by the Local Governance Act, which continued the Local Service Districts Regulation.

LSDs were operated by provincial staff. Residents had the opportunity to form committees to serve in an advisory capacity to provincial staff.

As management units collectively referred to as unincorporated areas, application of the LSD concept evolved to fit changes in communities over time, and they defined their communities to varying degrees. For example, sub-units of the LSD made it possible to have separate taxing authorities within an LSD where one area may have grown to have greater needs; an LSD covering a civil parish after the incorporation of a village or establishment of other LSDs may not have defined a community very well.

Provincial government guidelines required capitalising the words local service district only if they follow the specific part of the name: e.g. Flatlands Local Service District but the local service district of Flatlands.

A 2021 white paper recommended major reforms to New Brunswick's local governance system, including abolition of LSDs on 1 January 2023. Areas serviced by LSDs became parts of municipalities or, especially in sparsely populated areas, rural districts.

== History ==
The Royal Commission on Finance and Municipal Taxation was established in 1962 by Order-in-Council 62-185, tasked with performing a comprehensive review of the province's municipal structures and taxation. The Commission's report, often called the Byrne report for the Commission chair, Edward Byrne, released in 1964, recommended sweeping changes in the province's structure, including abolishing the incorporated county municipalities that governed rural areas of the province and replacing the authority for assessments, and tax collection in Provincial hands.

Valuation of property was at first undertaken by the department of municipal affairs, and billing and collection later became the responsibility of the Services Corporation.

The Municipalities Act of 1966 enacted local government structural changes recommended by the Byrne report. Local service districts were established on November 23 by Order-in-Council. Those rural areas that provided one or two services normally provided by municipalities, primarily fire protection, would be served by local service districts.

92 local service districts were established in 11 of the province's 15 counties. Gloucester (which today has more local service districts than any two other counties combined), Charlotte, Kings, and Northumberland Counties did not have any local service districts. Of the 92 LSDs, 86 were civil parishes; 81 provided only fire protection, while six added street lighting in at least part of the LSD, four added community services and recreational facilities, and one added garbage collection.

The LSD system was extended to other unincorporated areas as needed, with the parish of Musquash in 1985 completing the process. Many LSDs were formed from parts of existing LSDs, a process that continued until 1994; three more have been formed since by combining existing LSDs.

== Distribution ==
As of 1 June 2019 there were 236 LSDs. An additional eighty LSDs had been dissolved, most of incorporated as, or absorbed by, municipalities. The number of concurrent LSDs peaked at 291 in 1991 and declined since 1995.

There were 133 Parish LSDs (plus fifteen former parish LSDs), which range from entire parishes, such as Cardwell, to areas left over after large numbers of LSDs have been separated, such as Shippegan. The parishes of Gagetown, Grand Manan, Hampstead have never had parish LSDs; Huskisson, while unstated in Regulation 84-168, is part of LSD the parish of Harcourt.

The remaining 103 LSDs (plus 62 former) varied in nature – two were school districts dating from the original creation of LSDs in 1966, one an island, one a pair of islands, several centralised communities like Elgin, most decentralised communities or groups of communities (which could approach the size of parishes), and two resulted from mergers in 1996 (Chaleur) and 1999 (Allardville) that included three (two parish) and two (one parish) LSDs respectively.

== LSDs by county as of 1 June 2019 ==
County Name	Numbers of LSDs			Number of parishes	Notes
County Name	Current	Former	Total	Number of parishes	Notes
Albert	7		7	6	
Carleton	19		19	11	
Charlotte	19	4	23	15	No current parish LSD for Campobello and Saint Andrews (Note: Campobello incorporated as a rural community in 2010; Saint Andrews was replaced by Chamcook in 1997.); Never a parish LSD for Grand Manan (Note: Castalia, White Head Island, and Woodwards Cove all formed LSDs; the remaining parts of Grand Manan Island incorporated as villages and there was no need for an LSD in the unpopulated islands.)
Gloucester	44	28	72	10	No current parish LSD for Allardville, Inkerman or Saumarez (Note: Allardville parish LSD now part of Allardville LSD; Inkerman and Saumarez parish LSDs part of Regional Municipality of Tracadie.)
Kent	18	1	19	12	Huskisson Parish is part of LSD the parish of Harcourt, never having had its own parish LSD. (Note: Regulation 84-168 does not explicitly state this, but the rural plan for the Harcourt parish LSD does show Huskisson as part of it. The Harcourt LSD was created at a time when Huskisson was being included with Harcourt for census purposes, and presumably other government functions.); Shediac Bridge-Shediac River is listed with Westmorland County
Kings	15	1	16	15	
Madawaska	8	7	15	14	No current parish LSD for Baker Brook, Clair, Lac Baker, Saint-André, Saint-Basile, Saint-François or Saint-Hilaire (Note: All are now part of the rural community of Haut-Madawaska.)
Northumberland	23	9	32	13	No current parish LSD for Ludlow (Note: Part of the rural community of Upper Miramichi.)
Queens	11	1	12	10	Never a parish LSD for Gagetown or Hampstead (Note: Upper Gagetown LSD includes all of mainland Gagetown Parish not in the village of Gagetown or CFB Gagetown; Hampstead includes all of mainland Hampstead Parish not in CFB Gagetown.)
Restigouche	18	12	30	8	No current parish LSD for Colborne, Durham or Grimmer (Note: Colborne and Durham combined to form Chaleur in 1996; Grimmer Parish LSD became part of rural community of Kedgwick)
Saint John	4		4	3	
Sunbury	9		9	7	
Victoria	8		8	7	
Westmorland	17	13	30	7	Grande-Digue is listed with Kent County
York	16	4	20	14	Benton is listed with Carleton County
Totals	236	80	316	152	

== Other uses ==
The number of LSDs is sometimes misstated, due to the existence of three units that can be confused with official LSDs: areas with increased or decreased services, Taxing Authorities, and Census Designated Places that are called Local Service Districts.

- Special service areas (39 current plus 35 former) have been defined for different services than the parent LSD; with increasing regionalisation of services this has become limited to street lighting and/or community & recreation services. There does not seem to be an official term for such areas. Because the published descriptions of LSDs are only updated when voluntary services are added, many of these special service areas no longer serve any purpose.
- Taxing Authorities (280 in 2019) usually match LSDs and special areas, but can also be subdivisions of LSDs that do not differ in services or groupings of special areas. Names can also vary from the appropriate LSD or special area, with "the parish of" typically dropped from the names of parish LSDs and "Parish" sometimes appended for clarity. The taxing authorities of Calhoun Road, Havelock Inside, and Saint-Grégoire cross LSD boundaries.
  - Incorporated rural communities and the Regional Municipality of Tracadie continue to receive some LSD services from the provincial government. These former LSDs serve as TAs (21 in RCs, 21 in Tracadie) and are sometimes referred to as LSDs when discussing the provision of those services.
- Census Designated Places (DPL; 157 units in the 2016 census, including 34 parts of 16 divided DPLs) include current LSDs and special areas, as well as some former LSDs that have been incorporated into municipalities. The boundaries of DPLs don't always match those in Regulation 84-168, sometimes including isolated parts of parish LSDs bordering non-parish LSDs. The most pronounced variation from actual boundaries was with the local service district of the Parish of Saumarez, which consisted of the special area of Canton-des-Basques and five scattered pieces; the special area was classed as a DPL, and three other parts of the LSD were included in bordering LSDs for population counts and maps.

== Operation ==
A business-like approach guides property taxation and local service provision administration in the local service district, with a manager and staff looking after any number of LSD units, including the private ballot advisory committee elections. It is therefore limited in its democratic function.

All properties are assessed for value by an arm of the provincial services corporation, Service New Brunswick, on behalf of the finance department, and taxed on the assessed value a local and provincial rate.

Local rates in unincorporated areas, known as the L.S.D. rate, are determined by a provincial Local Services Manager in order to pay for local services and are levied on all properties. These assessments may be for facilities situated in the LSD, services provided locally, cost-sharing between LSDs or purchased from a neighbouring municipality, or shared costs of operation of facilities in a municipality. The base rate, which includes fire protection, is $0.6315 per $100 of assessed value for owner-occupied residential properties.

A provincial levy called the Provincial amount is applied to all properties at a fixed rate for general provincial revenues. Non owner-occupied residential properties pay "double" provincial tax, and a variety of schemes are in place for non-residential properties such as businesses, farm timberland, private timberland, not-for-profits, golf courses, etc. Businesses pay 50% more than the total rate for non owner-occupied residential properties.

Advisory committees may function to assist with the LSD Manager and staff and also elected local government officials. Committees do not have decision-making powers and are not required to take procedural accountability measures.

== Services ==
Originally all services within LSDs were voluntary, administered by area citizens and paid for by local property taxes. The provincial government has gradually taken over the administration of some services at the provincial level, with regional service commissions taking over many others. Regulation 84-168 has not kept up with these changes in administration, updating listed services only when boundary changes or addition of new services have taken place. Fire protection and recreational facilities are often paid for through cost-sharing with municipalities or other LSDs.

Services within LSDs can be grouped into two categories - mandatory and voluntary services. Mandatory services are:

- animal control
- dangerous or unsightly premises enforcement
- emergency measures
- fire protection
- land use planning
- rescue services
- police protection
- solid waste collection and disposal.

Voluntary services include, but are not limited to:

- street lighting
- recreational and sports facilities

== Local participation ==
Local service districts have always had the ability to elect advisory committees; the requirements for establishing such committees have changed since 1966.

Currently 25 or more residents who are qualified to vote under the Elections Act may petition the Minister of Local Government to call a meeting for the purpose of electing a committee; a simple majority vote at such a meeting is sufficient to establish a committee. There is no minimum number of voters required to elect or re-elect an advisory committee. LSD advisory committees are elected for a term of four years according to the government's cycle for general municipal elections. Elections may be held outside municipal election years if replacing a dissolved committee or establishing a committee in an LSD that previously lacked one. LSDAC elections are handled by the Department of Local Government, not Elections New Brunswick; because of this, elections do not require normal polling hours, nor do they require widespread advertising or a centralised website that lists them, often resulting in low voter turnout.

LSDs may establish an advisory committee of three to five members if a public meeting with sufficient eligible voters is held. LSD advisory committees are disbanded if their membership falls below three. The Committees have no legislative or taxing authority, but work with the Local Service District Manager to administer services and set local budgets.

Advisory committee presidents are asked to participate on regional service commission boards. A certain amount of consulting and service contracts are awarded as a result of LSD service activity, which provide economic activities.

== Local governance reform ==
The provincial government has been encouraging local service districts to participate in reforming government administration in rural areas.<! citation will follow> The rural community, an incorporated but non-municipal body, has been the most common model, although incorporation into existing municipalities has also been pursued. Since 2006 a total of 24 LSDs have become incorporated into rural communities or municipalities:

- Cocagne, Hanwell, and Upper Miramichi have become rural communities with the same name, while the parish of Campobello incorporated as the rural community of Campobello Island.
- The parish of Saint-André merged with the incorporated village of St. André to form the rural community of Saint-André.
- the parish of Grimmer merged with the incorporated village of Kedgwick to form the rural community of Kedgwick.
- Eighteen LSDs (and parts of two others) merged with the incorporated town of Tracadie-Sheila to form the regional municipality of Grand Tracadie-Sheila, which has since changed its name to Tracadie.

There have been dozens of other projects that are still in progress or have failed for various reasons, some reaching the plebiscite stage, many simply lacking local support to proceed to asking the government to conduct a feasibility study.

There have been at least two attempts by municipalities in Millville and Norton to devolve to local service districts, both rejected by the provincial government.

Planned reforms to New Brunswick's local governance system would abolish local service districts on 1 January 2023. The reforms include annexation to existing municipalities or incorporation in new local government entities for most populated areas in LSDs. The remaining area, including 9% of the 2016 population, will be organised into 12 rural districts, sometimes noncontiguous entities based on regional service commission boundaries. These

== Criticisms ==
The term "Democratic deficit" was used by Jean-Guy Finn (Local Governance Task Force, 2010) to describe an "unbalanced local government", as in: many residents without representation at a local level (35% of population and 90% of the provincial territory) and limited competition for elected offices (1/3 of municipal councils with less than 2000 pop acclaimed)

== Boundary issues ==
The boundary descriptions of LSDs have sometimes suffered from ambiguous language or lack of update of existing LSD boundaries when a new entity was created. Originally most LSDs were defined by parish boundaries or grant lines; in the 1980s provincial property identity numbers began replacing grant lines; since the mid-2000s maps showing property lines have been the norm. All methods have led to problems:

- Some original LSDs referenced school district boundaries, especially in Restigouche County, as did the later Black River-Hardwicke. There is no consolidated record of former school district boundaries in New Brunswick; the surviving records are scattered among various record series or documents and it is likely some records were destroyed.
- Grant-based descriptions often refer to groups of grants without reference to smaller grants or ungranted land within large tiers of grants.
- Expropriated land can create ambiguity when using grant lines. Dugas does not explicitly mention that the southern boundary of grants was after land was expropriated for the Village historique acadien.
- References to direction, e.g. "northern corner" are sometimes based on map orientation rather than geographic coordinates.
- Boundaries can overlap, usually due to a description of an older LSD not being updated when a new one was created. The Paroisse Notre-Dame-des-Érables overlaps with New Bandon-Salmon Beach where the actual grant lines are used by one and a prolongation of a grant line is used by the other.
- Poirier, which was established after the village of Maisonnette was incorporated, explicitly includes one land grant that is within the village.
- Descriptions based on provincial property IDs suffer from properties being subdivided or consolidated. The province does not maintain a consolidated list of changes in property identity numbers.
- Descriptions based on property lines that reference parish lines will sometimes include properties that are wholly within other parishes.
- The use of property maps when updating boundary descriptions sometimes confuses taxation authority boundaries for those of LSDs. The most recent update of the boundaries of Tabusintac removed one property on the boundary of Neguac while removing part of a property crossed by a stream formerly used to define the boundary with Fair Isle. The update of the parish of Woodstock following an expansion of the town of Woodstock extended the LSD's boundaries into Richmond Parish.

== See also ==
- List of local service districts in New Brunswick
- List of Rural Communities in New Brunswick
