= New Brunswick Route 120 =

Highway in New Brunswick, Canada

Route 120

Route information
- Maintained by New Brunswick Department of Transportation
- Length: 45 km (28 mi)
- Existed: 1965–present

Major junctions
- West end: R-289 at Saint-Jean-de-la-Lande, Quebec
- Route 161 in Clair; Route 144 in Edmundston
- East end: Route 2 (TCH) in Edmundston

Location
- Country: Canada
- Province: New Brunswick
- Major cities: Baker Brook, Edmundston

Highway system
- Provincial highways in New Brunswick; Former routes
← Route 119	→ Route 121

Route 120 is a New Brunswick highway in Madawaska County that runs from a junction with Quebec Route 289 at Saint-Jean-de-la-Lande, Quebec, to New Brunswick Route 2 in Edmundston.

== Communities ==
- Lac-Baker
- Portage-du-Lac
- Caron Brook
- Baker Brook
- Saint-Hilaire
- Verret
- Edmundston

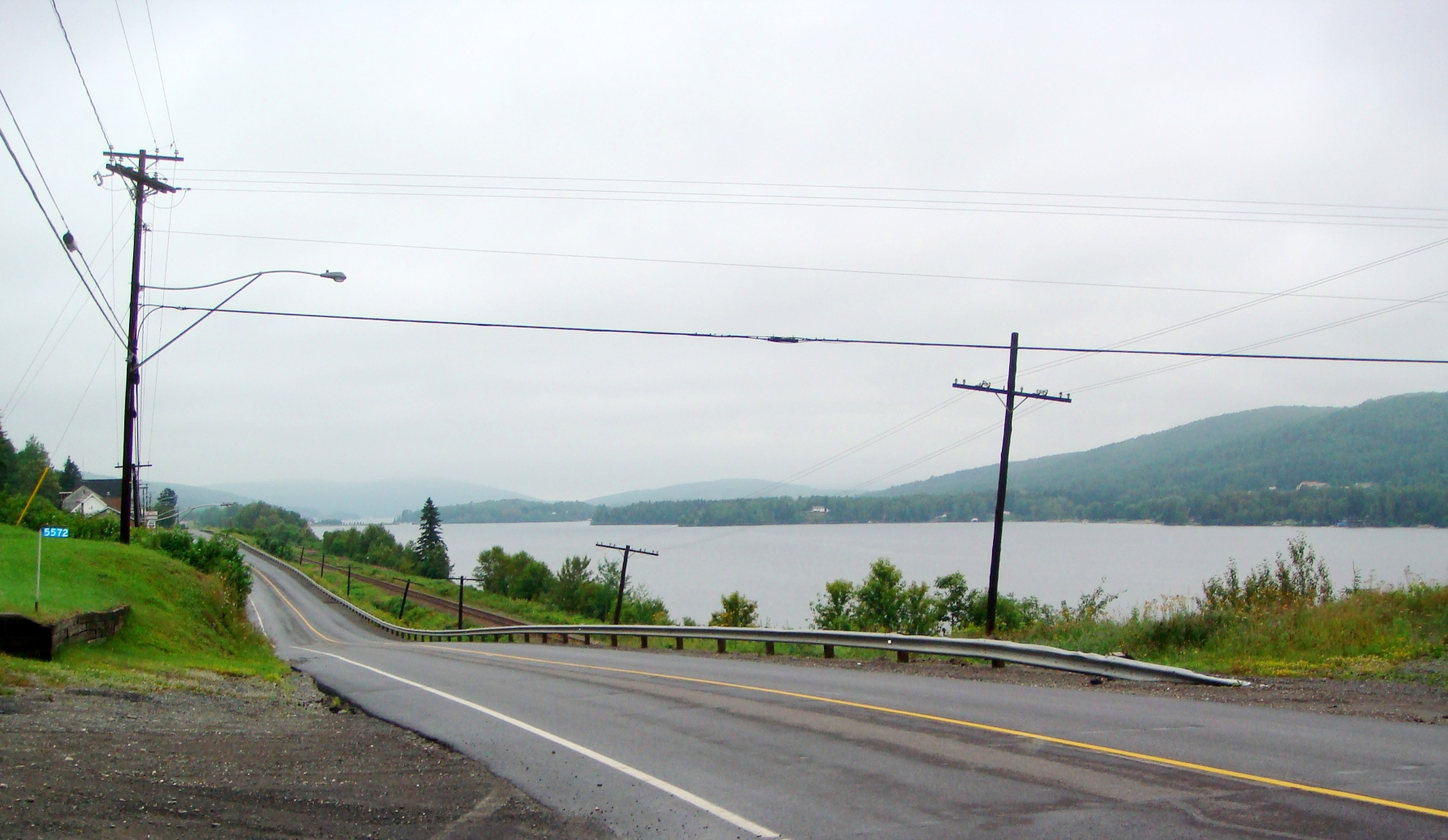
Route 120 along Lake Baker.

== See also ==
- List of New Brunswick provincial highways
