= Saint-François Parish =

Saint-François
- Parish
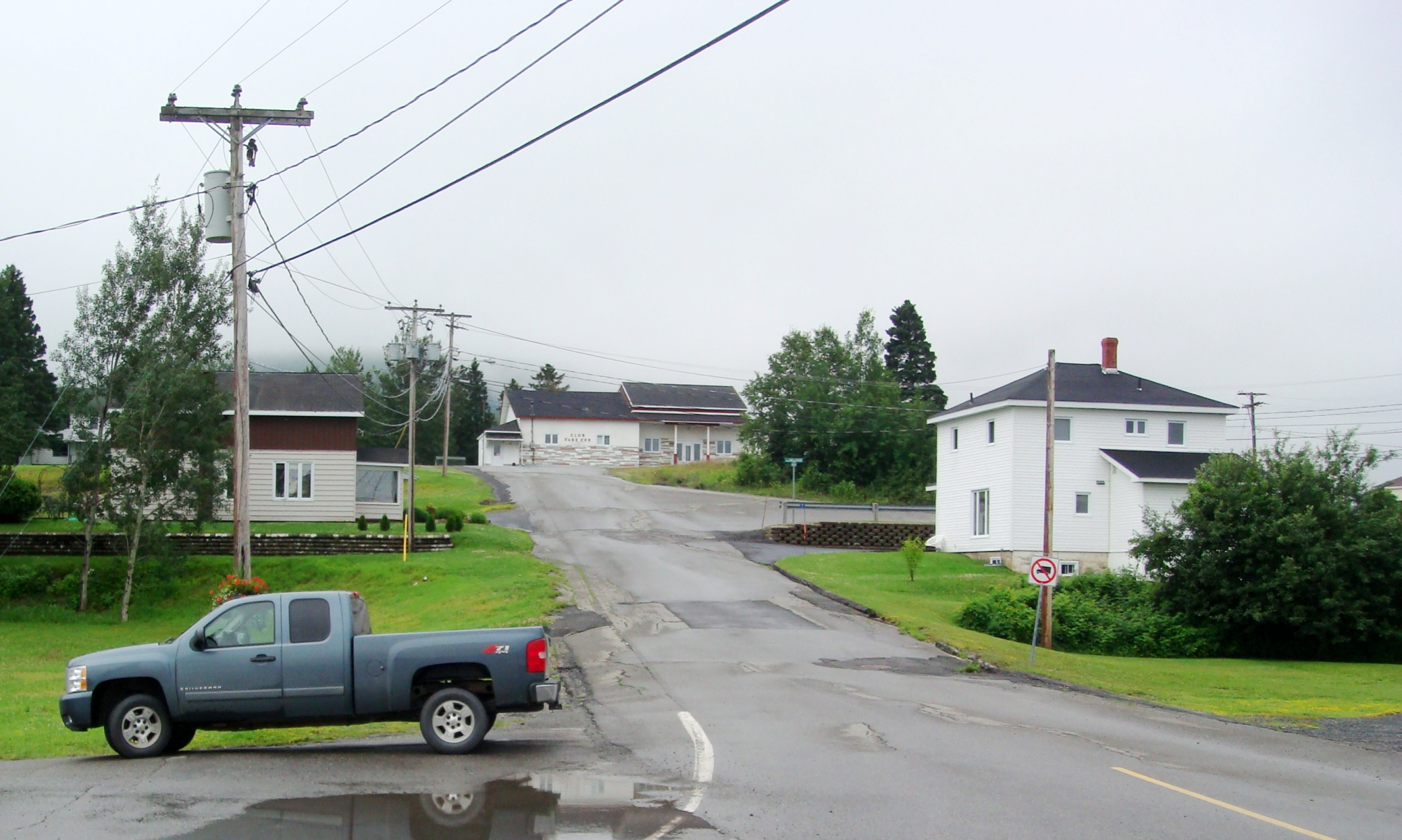
- St-François-de-Madawaska village

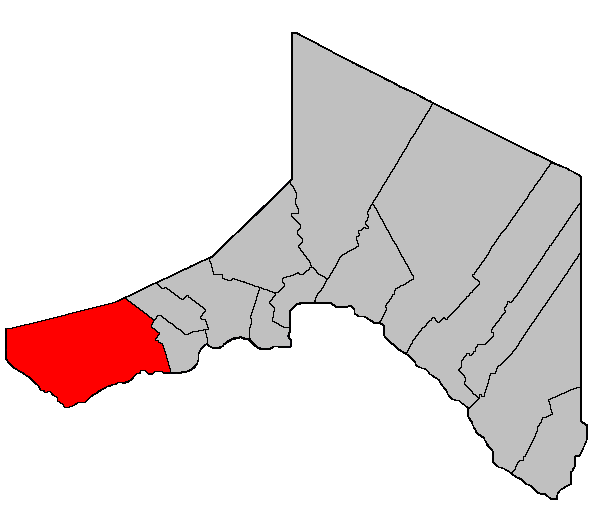
- Location within Madawaska County.
- Coordinates: 47.27°N 68.92°W
- Country: Canada
- Province: New Brunswick
- County: Madawaska
- Erected: 1850

Area
  - Land: 344.59 km^{2} (133.05 sq mi)

Population (2016)
  - Total: 606
  - Density: 1.8/km^{2} (4.7/sq mi)
  - Change 2011-2016: ▼3.8%
  - Dwellings: 347
- Time zone: UTC-4 (AST)
  - Summer (DST): UTC-3 (ADT)
- Figures do not include portion within village of Saint-François; No census data available after 2016

Saint-François is a geographic parish in Madawaska County, New Brunswick, Canada.

For governance purposes it is part of the incorporated rural community of Haut-Madawaska, which is a member of the Northwest Regional Service Commission (NWRSC).

== Origin of name ==
The parish takes its name from the St. Francis River.

== History ==
Saint-François was erected as Saint Francis in 1850 from Madawaska Parish.

In 1852 the parish was expanded northward to include territory award in the boundary settlement with Canada.

In 1877 the eastern part of Saint-François was included in the newly erected Saint-Hilaire Parish.

In 1900 Clair Parish was erected from the eastern part of Saint-François.

In 1946 the name was changed to Saint Francois and the boundaries were affected by the major reorganisation of Madawaska County parish lines.

In 1973 the name was changed to Saint-François.

== Boundaries ==
Saint-François Parish is bounded:

- on the northwest by the Quebec border;
- on the northeast and east, running mainly along grant lines, beginning on the provincial border at the westernmost corner of Range Three of the Baker Lake Settlement, then southeasterly along the southwestern line of Range Four to the northernmost corner of a grant in Range Four in Baker Lake Settlement, about 1.35 kilometres northwest of Chemin des Long, (Note: WP:ENG is ignored when it would result in a clumsy construction.) then southwesterly to the southwestern line of Range Four, then southeasterly along Range Four for about 2 kilometres to the northernmost corner of a grant in Range Five of Baker Brook Settlement, then southwesterly to the southwestern line of Range Five, then southeasterly to the northern line of Range Three north of the Saint John River, then easterly along Range Three to the prolongation of the western line of a grant to Edward Levasseur in Range Two north of the Saint John, located on the western side of the northern end of Levasseur Road, then southerly along the prolongation, the grant line, and the prolongation to the international border in the Saint John River;
- on the south and west by the international border within the Saint John River and Saint Francis River.

== Communities ==
Communities at least partly within the parish. italics indicate a name no longer in official use; all communities are part of the incorporated rural community of Haut-Madawaska

- Concession-des-Bouchard
- Concession-des-Jaunes
- Concession-des-Viel
- Connors
- Lac-Unique
- Little River Mills
- Mouth of St. Francis
- Pelletiers Mill
- Saint-François-de-Madawaska
- Val Oakes

== Bodies of water ==
Bodies of water (Note: Not including brooks, ponds or coves.) at least partly in the parish.

- Crocs River
- Saint-François River
- Saint John River
- Mill Stream
- Lac à Landry
- Cross Lake
- Glasier Lake
- Mud Lake
- Rocky Brook Lakes
- Lac Unique

== Islands ==
Islands at least partly in the parish.

- Arsenault Island
- Cranberry Island
- Crock Island
- Foley Island
- Hafey Island
- Kennedy Island

== Other notable places ==
Parks, historic sites, and other noteworthy places at least partly in the parish.

- Foley Island Protected Natural Area
- Glazier Lake Protected Natural Area
- Grew Brook Protected Natural Area

== Demographics ==
Parish population total does not include Saint-François-de-Madawaska

=== Population ===
Canada census – Saint-François Parish community profile

	2016	2011
Population	606 (-3.8% from 2011)	630 (-16.4% from 2006)
Land area	344.59 km^{2} (133.05 sq mi)	344.70 km^{2} (133.09 sq mi)
Population density	1.8/km^{2} (4.7/sq mi)	1.8/km^{2} (4.7/sq mi)
Median age	49.8 (M: 50.8, F: 48.8)	47.0 (M: 47.0, F: 47.0)
Private dwellings	347 (total)	309 (total)
Median household income	$60,096	$.N/A

Notes: 2011 income data for this area has been suppressed for data quality or confidentiality reasons.
References: 2016 2011

Historical Census Data
Saint-François Parish, New Brunswick

Year	Pop.	±%
1991	904	—
1996	891	−1.4%

Year	Pop.	±%
2001	858	−3.7%
2006	754	−12.1%

Year	Pop.	±%
2011	630	−16.4%
2016	606	−3.8%

=== Language ===
Canada Census Mother Tongue - Saint-François Parish, New Brunswick
Census	Total	French			English			French & English			Other		
Year	Responses	Count	Trend	Pop %	Count	Trend	Pop %	Count	Trend	Pop %	Count	Trend	Pop %
2011	630	580	▼15.9%	92.06%	45	▲11.1%	7.14%	5	▼66.7%	0.79%	0	0.0%	0.00%
2006	745	690	▼12.1%	92.62%	40	▼42.9%	5.37%	15	▲ n/a%	2.01%	0	0.0%	0.00%
2001	855	785	▼4.3%	91.81%	70	▲14.3%	8.19%	0	▼100.0%	0.00%	0	0.0%	0.00%
1996	905	820	n/a	90.61%	60	n/a	6.63%	25	n/a	2.76%	0	n/a	0.00%

== See also ==
- Crocs River, a stream
- List of parishes in New Brunswick
