= Connors, New Brunswick =

Community in New Brunswick, Canada

Coordinates: 47.200°N 68.833°W

Location of Connors in New Brunswick

Connors is a community in Madawaska County on Route 205. It borders the Saint John River to the south. Connors is in "the panhandle" just where New Brunswick, Quebec, and Maine all come together, near the Saint John River which forms the boundary of Canada and the US at this location. In the phone listings, it is under LAC BAKER phone exchange (992- numbers).

Most people are French speaking. Many Irish and other ethnic groups settled in this heavily forested area in the 19th century, along with folks from nearby Québec. Since the Irish were Catholic like the French speakers, there was a great deal of inter-marriage. Today, there are many people with Irish and Scottish surnames who are entirely French-speaking here, while others with French surnames speak only English. Connors is a place where people made their living from forestry rather than farming. This whole area is quite remote from major population centres, and is now having major economic problems because there is no other livelihood except logging and sawmills. Many of the younger people on both sides of the border have been leaving for better job prospects in bigger cities (Bangor or Portland, Maine, or Montreal and Quebec City, or Fredericton and Saint John, New Brunswick, and sometimes even Halifax, Nova Scotia). The community was connected to the Quebec Central Railway in 1908, a rail service which has since become defunct.

== See also ==
- List of communities in New Brunswick
