= Saint-Basile Parish =

Saint-Basile St. Basil, St. Basile
- Parish
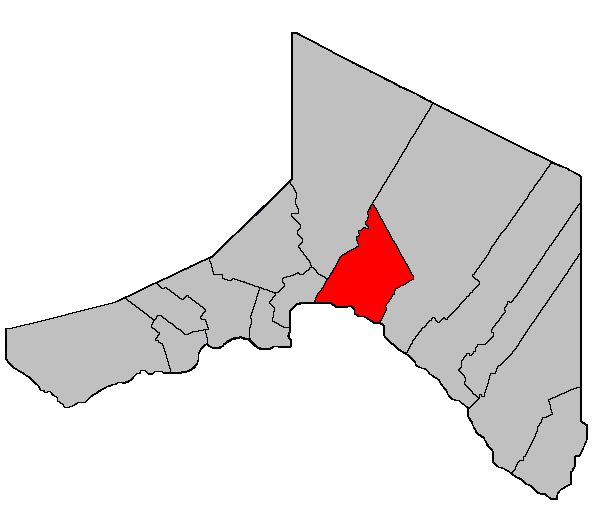
- Location within Madawaska County.
- Coordinates: 47.36°N 68.255°W
- Country: Canada
- Province: New Brunswick
- County: Madawaska
- Erected: 1850

Area
  - Land: 129.96 km^{2} (50.18 sq mi)

Population (2021)
  - Total: 736
  - Density: 4.6/km^{2} (12/sq mi)
  - Change 2016-2021: ▼24.3%
  - Dwellings: 342
- Time zone: UTC-4 (AST)
  - Summer (DST): UTC-3 (ADT)
- Figures do not include portions within the city of Edmundston and the St. Basile 10 Indian reserve

Saint-Basile is a geographic parish in Madawaska County, New Brunswick, Canada. (Note: The Territorial Division Act divides the province into 152 parishes, the cities of Saint John and Fredericton, and one town of Grand Falls. The Interpretation Act clarifies that parishes include any local government within their borders.)

For governance purposes it is divided between the city of Edmundston, the St. Basile 10 Indian Reserve, and the Northwest rural district; the city and rural district are members of the Northwest Regional Service Commission.

Before the 2023 governance reform, the area now in the rural district formed the local service district of the parish of Saint-Basile.

== Origin of name ==
The parish was named for the Roman Catholic church.

== History ==
Saint-Basile was erected as Saint Basil in 1850 from Madawaska Parish.

In 1852 the parish's boundaries were extended northward to include territory awarded in the boundary settlement with the Province of Canada.

In 1874 the core of modern Edmundston was removed from Saint-Basile and added to Madawaska Parish.

In 1877 the newly erected Sainte-Anne Parish included part of Saint-Basile.

In 1896 the boundary along Green River was altered.

In 1920 part of Saint-Basile was erected as Rivière-Verte Parish.

In 1973 the name was officially changed to Saint-Basile.

== Boundaries ==
Saint-Basile Parish is bounded:

- on the northeast, beginning about 1.8 kilometres northeasterly of the Green River (Note: The English name Green River and the French name Rivière Verte are both official.) at a point on the prolongation of the northwestern line of a grant to John Hart on the Saint John River, then running southeasterly along the prolongation of the northeastern line of Tier Four northeast of the Green River and then Tier Four to the easternmost corner of Lot 21, about 825 metres west of the Quisibis River;
- on the southeast, running entirely along grant lines, beginning at the corner of Lot 21 and running southwesterly across Tier Three and Tier Two to the southernmost corner of a grant to Ferdinand Lavoie, about 400 metres northwesterly of the end of Therrien Road, then southeasterly about 200 metres to the easternmost corner of a grant in Tier One to Felix Martin, then southwesterly along the southeastern line of the Martin grant to Green River, then across Green River and southwesterly along the southeastern line of a grant to James Smyth to the rear line of grants along the Saint John River, then southeasterly about 475 metres along the Saint John River tier to the easternmost corner of a grant to Peter Cere, then southwesterly along the Cere grant to the international border within the Saint John River;
- on the south by the international border running upstream within the Saint John River;
- on the northwest, (Note: The Territorial Act has an overlap of Saint-Basile and Saint-Joseph Parish; this is due to Saint-Basile being omitted from the 1946 rewrite of parish boundaries in Madawaska County. The wording of the 1946 Act gave the Saint-Joseph boundaries precedence and the wording of the northwestern boundary of Saint-Basile has never been corrected.) beginning on the international border within the Saint John on the prolongation of the northwestern line of the Hart grant, which passes between and roughly parallels Saint-Louis and Irène Streets near the river, then running northeasterly along the Hart grant and its prolongation to a point about 700 metres past the Iroquois River, then southeasterly about 75 metres along the rear line of the Saint John River grants to the westernmost corner of Tier Two behind the Saint John, then northeasterly along the northwestern lines of Tiers Two, Three, and Four to Tier Five, then northwesterly about 75 metres to the westernmost corner of a Tier Five grant to Remi H. Martin, then northeasterly along the northwestern line of the Martin grant and its prolongation to meet the prolongation of the northwestern line of a tier of grants on the eastern side of Green River, then northeasterly along the prolongation and the tier to the western channel of Green River, passing through the southern loop of Deuxième-Sault Road and the northern tip of an unnamed island in the river, then northerly about 450 metres up Green River to the southern line of a grant to Octave Therriault on the south side of Étang Deuxième-Sault (the pond above Second Falls), then easterly and northerly around the outside of the Therriault grant to the pond, then up Green River past the mouth of Burnt Camp Brook to meet the prolongation of the Hart grant, then northeasterly along the prolongation to the starting point.

== Communities ==
Communities at least partly within the parish. bold indicates an incorporated municipality or Indian reserve; italics indicate a name no longer in official use

- Boniface Bridge
- **Edmundston**
  - Iroquois
  - Saint-Basile
- Jalbert
- Maillet
- Montagne-des-Therrien
- Rang-des-Lavoie
- **St. Basile 10**

== Bodies of water ==
Bodies of water (Note: Not including brooks, ponds or coves.) at least partly in the parish.

- Green River (French Rivière Verte)
- Iroquois River
- Saint John River
- Ruisseau à la Coulée Noire
- Lac à Poisson
- Lac de Vase

== Islands ==
Islands at least partly in the parish.

- Madawaska Islands

== Demographics ==
Parish population total does not include Indian reserve or portion in Edmundston

=== Population ===
Canada census – Saint-Basile community profile

| | 2021 | 2016 | 2011 |
| Population | 736 (+24.3% from 2016) | 592 (-17.4% from 2011) | 717 (-10.3% from 2006) |
| Land area | 129.96 km^{2} (50.18 sq mi) | 129.61 km^{2} (50.04 sq mi) | 129.74 km^{2} (50.09 sq mi) |
| Population density | 5.7/km^{2} (15/sq mi) | 4.6/km^{2} (12/sq mi) | 5.5/km^{2} (14/sq mi) |
| Median age | 51.2 (M: 51.6, F: 51.2) | 47.5 (M: 48.0, F: 47.1) | 44.7 (M: 46.1, F: 42.9) |
| Private dwellings | 325 (total) | 270 (total) | 313 (total) |
| Median household income | | $58,048 | $46,535 |

References: 2021 2016 2011

Historical Census Data
Saint-Basile Parish, New Brunswick

| Year | Pop. | ±% |
|---|---|---|
| 1991 | 694 | — |
| 1996 | 672 | −3.2% |

| Year | Pop. | ±% |
|---|---|---|
| 2001 | 705 | +4.9% |
| 2006 | 799 | +13.3% |

| Year | Pop. | ±% |
|---|---|---|
| 2011 | 717 | −10.3% |
| 2016 | 592 | −17.4% |

=== Language ===
Canada Census Mother Tongue - Saint-Basile Parish, New Brunswick
| Census | Total | French | | | English | | | French & English | | | Other | | |
| Year | Responses | Count | Trend | Pop % | Count | Trend | Pop % | Count | Trend | Pop % | Count | Trend | Pop % |
| 2011 | 715 | 695 | ▼11.5% | 97.20% | 20 | ▲33.3% | 2.80% | 0 | 0.0% | 0.00% | 0 | 0.0% | 0.00% |
| 2006 | 800 | 785 | ▲18.9% | 98.13% | 15 | 0.0% | 1.87% | 0 | ▼100.0% | 0.00% | 0 | 0.0% | 0.00% |
| 2001 | 710 | 660 | ▲1.5% | 92.96% | 15 | ▲50.0% | 2.11% | 35 | ▲250.0% | 4.93% | 0 | 0.0% | 0.00% |
| 1996 | 670 | 650 | n/a | 97.01% | 10 | n/a | 1.49% | 10 | n/a | 1.49% | 0 | n/a | 0.00% |

== See also ==
- List of parishes in New Brunswick
