= Republic of Madawaska =

Short-lived putative republic

Coordinates: 47.510°N 68.208°W

- 1827
- Flag

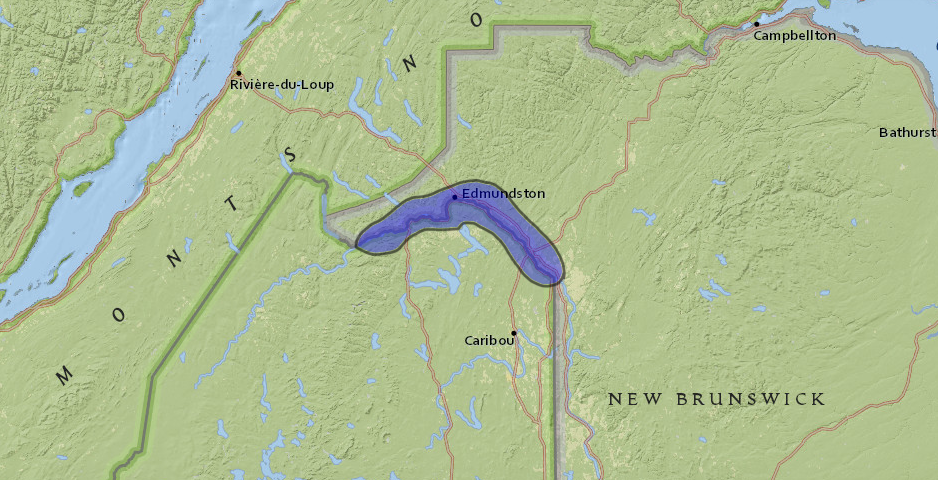
- The Republic was made up of local communities on both sides of the St. John river, largely being land close to Edmundston.
- Status: Unrecognized state
- Capital: n/a
- Largest city: Edmundston
- Common languages: French, English
- Government: Republic
- "General"
  - 1827: John Baker
- History
  - Independence declared: July 4 1827
  - Arrest of John Baker: September 25 1827
Preceded by
New Brunswick
Lower Canada
Maine
Succeeded by
New Brunswick
Lower Canada
Maine

The Republic of Madawaska (French: République du Madawaska) was a putative republic in the northwest corner of Madawaska County, New Brunswick (also known as the "New Brunswick Panhandle") and adjacent areas of Aroostook County in the US state of Maine and of Quebec.

The word Madawaska comes from the Miꞌkmaq-language words madawas ('place of') and kak ('porcupine'). Thus, Madawaska is 'the land of the porcupine'. The Madawaska River which flows into the Saint John River at Edmundston, New Brunswick, and Madawaska, Maine, flows through the region.

== History ==
The origins of the unorganized republic lie in the Treaty of Paris, which established the border between the United States of America and the British North American colonies. As with several other disputed areas along the imprecisely defined border, the Madawaska area and the larger region of overlap between Maine and New Brunswick remained in dispute until 1842.

=== John Baker ===
In 1817, a US settler, John Baker, arrived in the region. He made his residence west of the junction of the Meruimticook (now Baker Brook, after him) and Saint John Rivers. This area is now Baker-Brook, New Brunswick. Outside of the Madawaska settlement, hardly anyone lived in what is now Aroostook County. At the 1830 census, Madawaska settlement had a population of 2,487 people. Aroostook, with 261, and Houlton Plantation, with 576, were the closest settlements.

In 1825, Baker petitioned the state of Maine for Madawaska's inclusion in the state. Believing fervently that the territory belonged to Maine, Baker became an agitator and provocateur toward the British government. In 1827, Baker provoked the British authorities by attempting to stop the mail being sent by canoe from Madawaska to Quebec on the St. John River; by trying to get the French residents of Madawaska to reject British authority; by preventing a constable from carrying out an arrest; as well as other such defiance of British authority.

On July 4, 1827, John Baker held an Independence Day celebration at his house and invited all Madawaska settlers. At the time, 16 American families lived in the Upper Saint John River Valley, as well as French settlers. At his event, Baker proclaimed the entire Madawaska Territory to be independent of all foreign jurisdiction and vowed not to acknowledge any other authority than the United States. A flag sewn by his wife, Sophronia (aka Sophie) Rice, was raised in salute of the new republic. The event was followed by an evening ball at which Baker called another gathering for August 10 to consider ratifying a "Compact" government.

Baker himself prepared the Madawaska Compact, assisted by Steven Grover. It called for a pledge of mutual support and dispute resolution through elected arbiters without recourse to British authorities. The government was to be led by Baker as "General" of the Republic and two other men, Charles Stetson and James Bacon. The General was to be invested with special confiscatory powers. After one year of existence, the "counterfeit republic" was to apply to the State of Maine for annexation.

On August 10, 1827, a local magistrate arrived to confiscate "the paper which had been offered for signature" and call for Baker's submission to New Brunswick's authority. Baker refused, arguing he was on American soil. Mrs. Baker raised the Madawaska flag, and the magistrate ordered Baker to take it down, to be met again by Baker's refusal. The magistrate departed, after which Baker traveled to Portland to ascertain from the governor and legislature the extent of protection the State would provide.

After being away for a month, he returned and three days later, on September 25, was arrested before dawn under a warrant issued during his absence. He was charged with high misdemeanors and spent the next 13 months in the Fredericton jail. Baker served the first seven months in jail because he could not afford both to post bail and, in a civil process, repay an overdue debt. In May, 1828, he was convicted by a jury "for violently opposing and resisting His Majesty's authority and the execution of the laws in the upper part of the parish of Kent, and attempting to seduce His Majesty's subjects there to depart from their allegiance to His Majesty", fined £25 and jailed for two months unless the fine was paid. After two months, Baker still refused to pay the fine and was held in jail until October 21, when he did post bond to pay his fine before year-end.

=== International attention ===
The Baker situation became an international incident, with President John Quincy Adams asking Secretary of State Henry Clay to investigate the matter. Once informed, Clay exchanged letters with the British government regarding Baker. Both sides acknowledged that the U.S. could not be culpable for Baker's agitations. The events, however, did add impetus to the need to settle the boundary.

In 1831, Baker led an effort to create a township of Madawaska after the Maine legislature re-emphasized its claims to the disputed northern area. A warrant was issued for his arrest, but he avoided apprehension by fleeing into the woods and warning several neighbors, who joined him in taking cover outdoors. Nine years after that, in 1840, Baker was convicted and fined £20 for "having enticed several soldiers to desert from the detachment of the 58th Regiment stationed at Madawaska."

=== Aroostook War ===
After the undeclared Aroostook War (1838–39), the United States and the United Kingdom signed the Webster–Ashburton Treaty on August 9, 1842, finally settling the boundary question. One provision of that treaty appears to have applied in effect only to Baker and the estate of his neighbor. The region was thus annexed to Canada East (now named Quebec) and following an arbitration period, was awarded to New Brunswick through the New Brunswick Boundary Act of 1851.

== Gallery ==
Bicentennial version of the Madawaska Flag, with a porcupine.

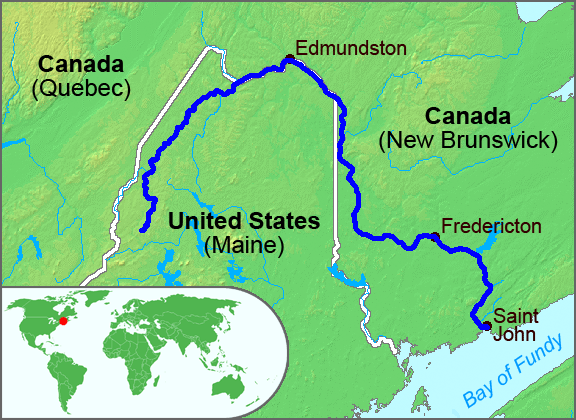
The Saint John River with the New Brunswick–Maine border and the location of Edmundston.

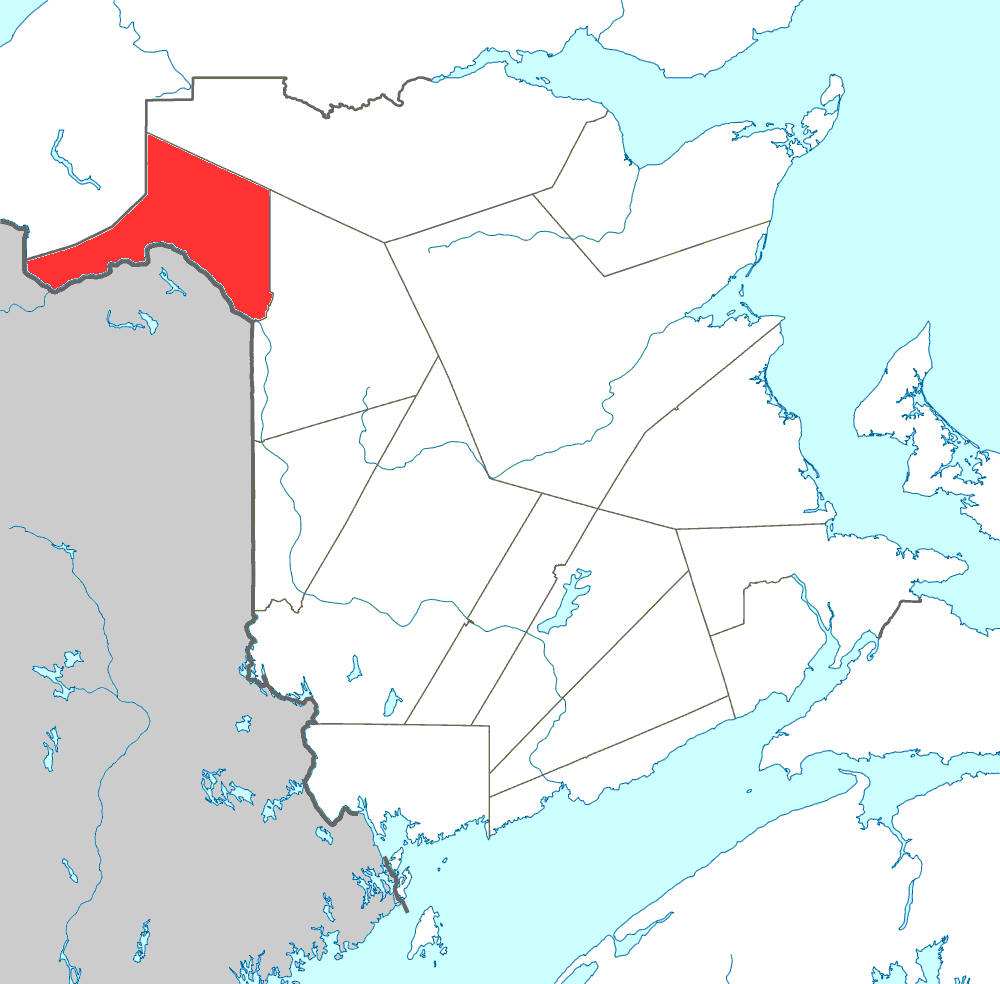
The modern Madawaska County in New Brunswick.

1938 version of the Republic of Madawaska flag.

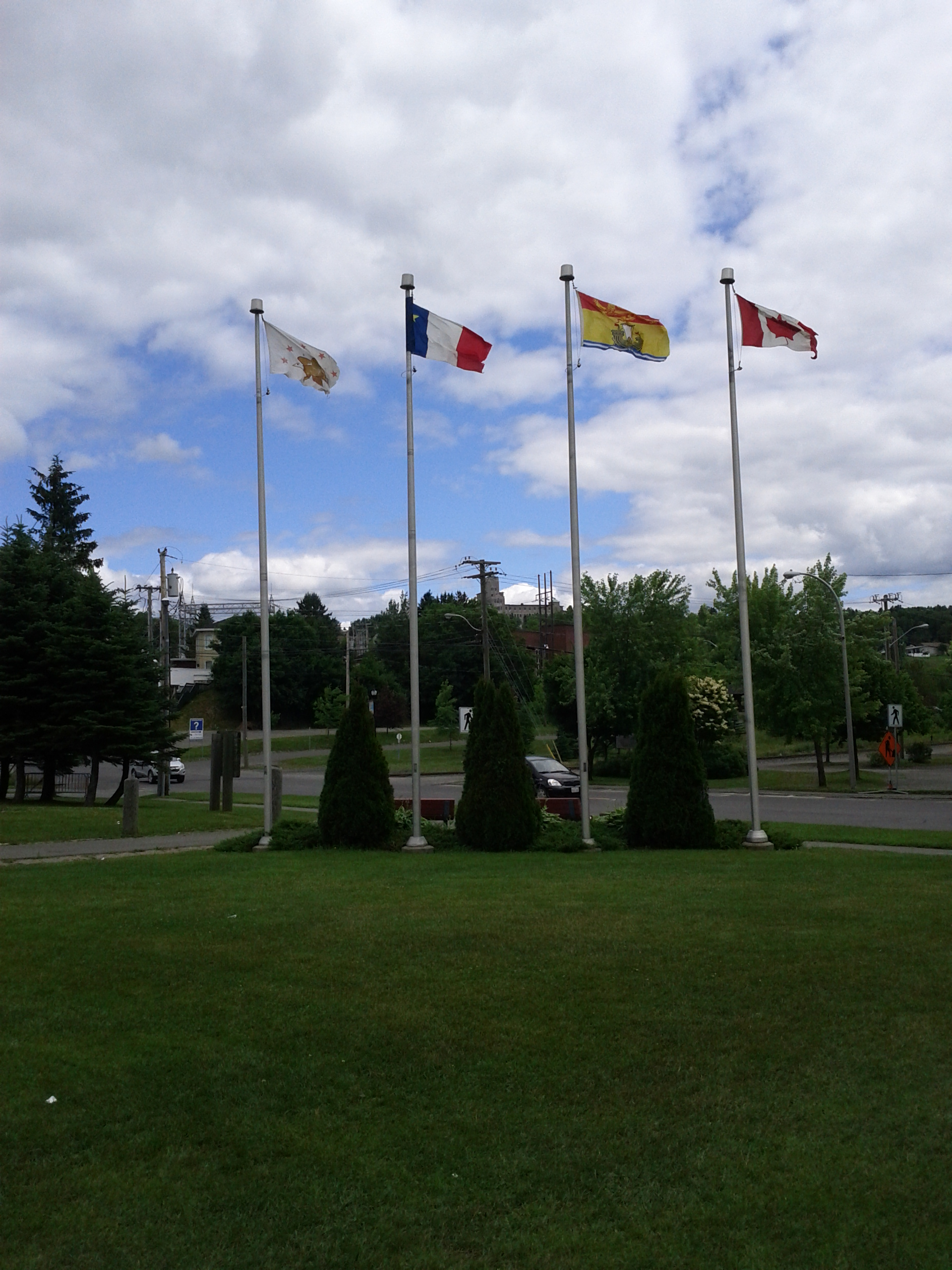
The Republic of Madawaska flag (left), flies along with the Acadian, New Brunswick and Canadian flags in downtown Edmundston, New Brunswick.
