= Verret, New Brunswick =

Former village in New Brunswick, Canada

Verret
- Former village
- Interactive map of Verret
- Coordinates: 47°21′13″N 68°24′2″W
- Country: Canada
- Province: New Brunswick
- County: Madawaska
- Municipality: Edmundston
- Incorporated: October 1, 1978
- Amalgamated: 1998
- Time zone: UTC−4 (Atlantic Standard Time)
  - Summer (DST): UTC−3 (Atlantic Daylight Time)
- Area code: 506

Verret was an incorporated village in the Canadian province of New Brunswick until 1998, when it amalgamated with Edmundston. Before becoming a village, it formed a local service district.

== See also ==
- List of neighbourhoods in New Brunswick
