= Lac Baker Parish =

Lac Baker
- Parish
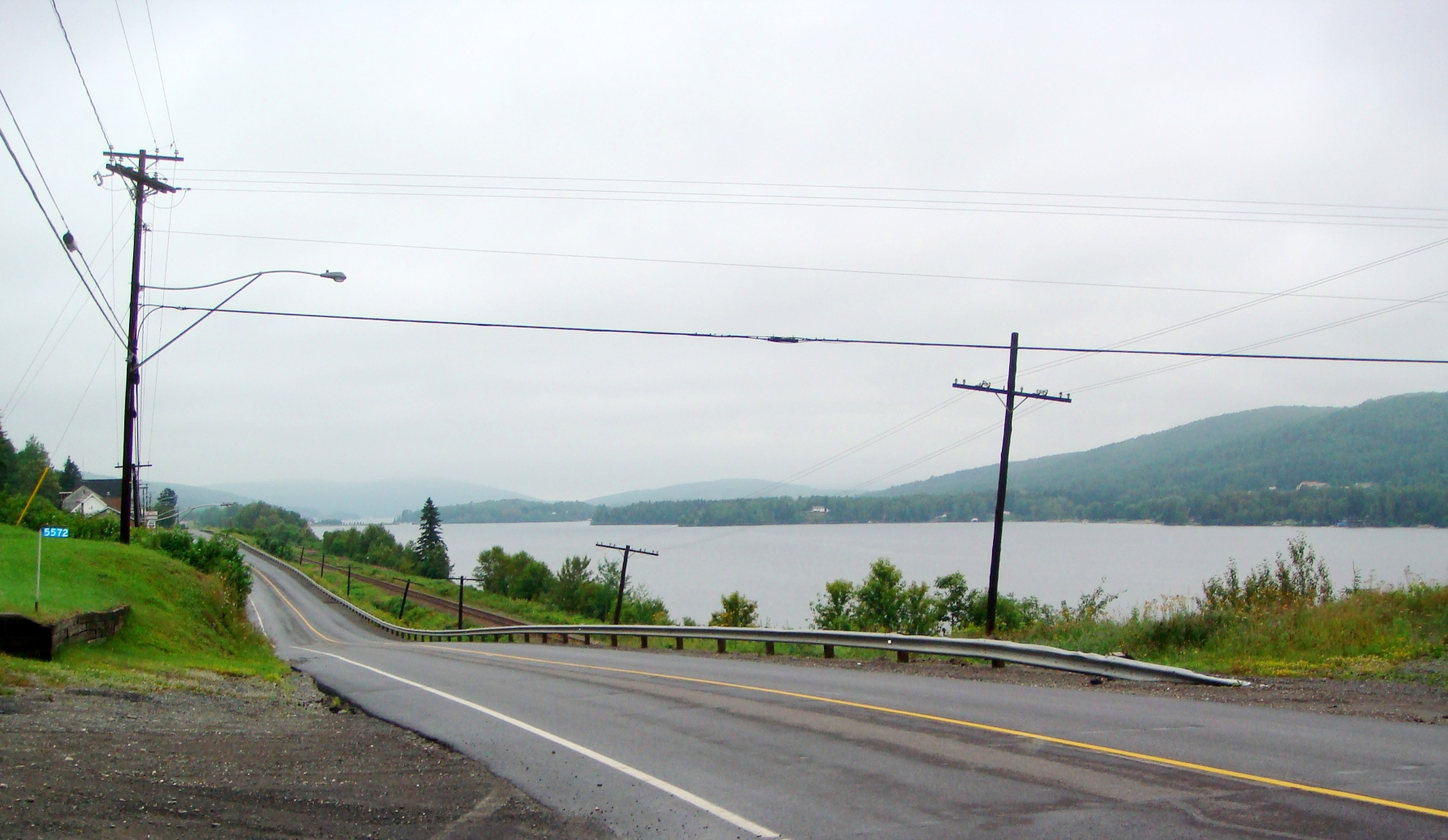
- Lake Baker

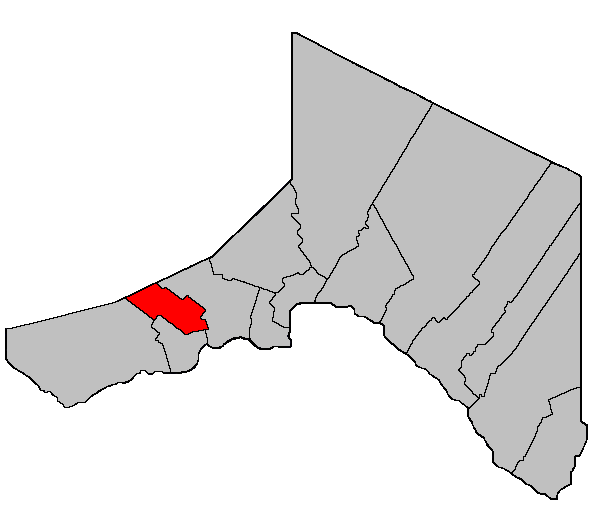
- Location within Madawaska County
- Coordinates: 47.36°N 68.68°W
- Country: Canada
- Province: New Brunswick
- County: Madawaska
- Erected: 1912

Area
  - Land: 24.30 km^{2} (9.38 sq mi)

Population (2016)
  - Total: 5
  - Density: 0.2/km^{2} (0.52/sq mi)
  - Change 2011-2016: No change
  - Dwellings: 4
- Time zone: UTC-4 (AST)
  - Summer (DST): UTC-3 (ADT)
- Figures do not include portion within village of Lac Baker; No census data available after 2016

Lac Baker is a geographic parish in Madawaska County, New Brunswick, Canada.

Before 2023, it was divided for governance purposed between the village of Lac Baker and the incorporated rural community of Haut-Madawaska, both of which are members of the Northwest Regional Service Commission (NWRSC).

== Origin of name ==
The parish takes its name from Baker Lake, which takes its name from John Baker, an American leader in the Aroostook War. Baker remained in the area after the boundary settlement awarded the area to New Brunswick.

== History ==
Lac Baker was erected as Baker Lake in 1912 from Clair Parish; the boundary was slightly altered later that year.

The parish was renamed Lac Baker and its boundaries affected by the major reorganisation of Madawaska County parish lines in 1946.

== Boundaries ==
Lac Baker Parish is bounded:

- on the northwest by the Quebec provincial border;
- on the northeast and east, running entirely along grant lines, beginning on the provincial border at the eastern line of a grant on the eastern side of Lac Baker and running southeasterly along the Lac Baker grants to the northwestern line of Range Five of the Nadeau Settlement, near Baker-Brook River, then northeasterly to the northeastern line of Range Five, then southeasterly to the northwestern line of a grant in Range Four of Nadeau Settlement, about 550 metres southeast of Baker-Brook River, then northeasterly to the northeastern line of Range Four, then southeasterly past the end of Range Four to the northernmost corner of a grant to Maxime Cloutier, about 500 metres northeast of Morneault Road, then southwesterly along the southeastern line of the Cloutier grant and a grant to Thomas Ouellette, running partially along Chemin du Lac, (Note: WP:ENG is ignored when it would result in a clumsy construction.) to the southernmost corner of the Ouellette grant, then southeasterly along the northeastern line of a grant straddling Chemin du Lac, to the northern line of a grant on the eastern side of Caron Brook, then easterly to the northeastern corner of the grant, then southerly along the Caron Brook grants to the northern line of grants on the Saint John River;
- on the south, running entirely along grants lines, beginning at the southeastern corner of the grants east of Caron Brook, running westerly along the northern line of the Saint John River grants to an inland grant on Brown Road, then southwesterly and westerly along two grants on Brown Road to the southern point of Range Two of the Baker Lake Settlement;
- on the southwest, running entirely along grant lines, starting on the southern point of Range Two of Baker Lake Settlement and running northwesterly along the southwestern line of Range Two to a point about 1.35 kilometres northwest of Chemin des Long, then southwesterly to the southwestern line of Range Three of Baker Lake Settlement, then northwesterly to the provincial border.

== Communities ==
Communities at least partly within the parish. bold indicates an incorporated municipality; italics indicate a name no longer in official use

- Concession-des-Ouellette
- **Lac Baker**
  - Boundary (Lac Baker-Nord)
  - Portage-du-Lac
  - Saint-Castin
  - Soucy
- Rang-des-Collin

== Bodies of water ==
Bodies of water (Note: Not including brooks, ponds or coves.) at least partly in the parish.

- Baker-Brook River
- Lac à Eugène
- Lac à Lang
- Lac Baker
- Lac Caron

== Islands ==
Islands at least partly in the parish.

- Île à Caron
- Île de Lac-Baker

== Census data ==
Census data refers only to the Census subdivision of the parish, much of which was annexed by the village of Lac Baker in 2008.

=== Population ===
Canada census – Lac Baker community profile

	2021	2016	2011
Population	685 (-0.7% from 2016)	5 (-83.3% from 2011)	5 (-83.3% from 2006)
Land area	37.24 km^{2} (14.38 sq mi)	24.30 km^{2} (9.38 sq mi)	24.29 km^{2} (9.38 sq mi)
Population density	18.4/km^{2} (48/sq mi)		0.2/km^{2} (0.52/sq mi)
Median age	58.8 (M: 59.6, F: 58.4)	N/A (M: , F: )	N/A (M: , F: )
Private dwellings	459 (total) 336 (occupied)	4 (total)	4 (total)
Median household income	$69,000	$.N/A	$.N/A

Notes: 2011 and 2016 income data for this area has been suppressed for data quality or confidentiality reasons.
References: 2021 2016 2011

Historical Census Data - Lac Baker Parish, New Brunswick

Year	Pop.	±%
1991	508	—
1996	472	−7.1%
2001	488	+3.4%

Year	Pop.	±%
2006	566	+16.0%
2006A	30	−94.7%
2011	5	−83.3%

Year	Pop.	±%
2011	5	+0.0%

**(A) adjustment due to boundary change.**

=== Language ===
Canada Census Mother Tongue - Lac Baker Parish, New Brunswick 2011 and 2016 language data for this area has been suppressed for data quality or confidentiality reasons.
Census	Total	French			English			French & English			Other		
Year	Responses	Count	Trend	Pop %	Count	Trend	Pop %	Count	Trend	Pop %	Count	Trend	Pop %
2011	n/a	n/a	0.0%	0.00%	n/a	0.0%	0.00%	n/a	0.0%	0.00%	n/a	0.0%	0.00%
2006	570	520	▲9.6%	0.00%	50	▲70.0%	0.00%	0	0.0%	0.00%	0	0.0%	0.00%
2001	485	470	▲1.1%	96.91%	15	▲33.3%	3.09%	0	0.0%	0.00%	0	0.0%	0.00%
1996	475	465	n/a	97.89%	10	n/a	2.11%	0	n/a	0.00%	0	n/a	0.00%

== See also ==
- List of parishes in New Brunswick
