= Lac-Unique, New Brunswick =

Canadian rural community

Coordinates: 47°20′N 68°45′W

Lac Unique is a Canadian rural community in Madawaska County, New Brunswick.

== See also ==
- List of communities in New Brunswick
