= Saint-Hilaire Parish =

Saint-Hilaire
- Parish
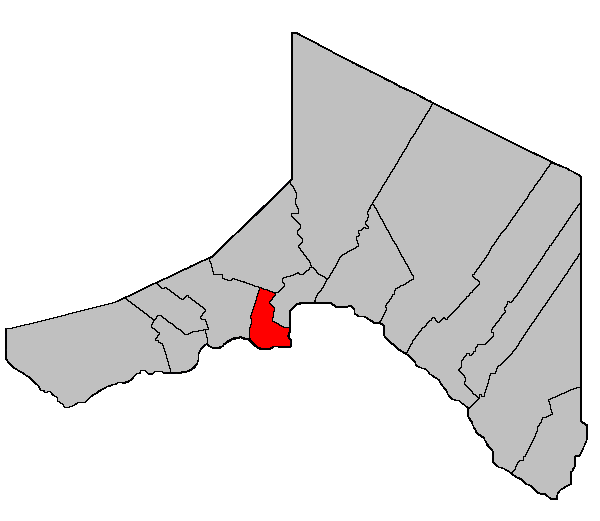
- Location within Madawaska County.
- Coordinates: 47.3125°N 68.44°W
- Country: Canada
- Province: New Brunswick
- County: Madawaska
- Erected: 1877

Area
  - Land: 41.90 km^{2} (16.18 sq mi)

Population (2016)
  - Total: 478
  - Density: 11.4/km^{2} (30/sq mi)
  - Change 2011-2016: ▼2.4%
  - Dwellings: 196
- Time zone: UTC-4 (AST)
  - Summer (DST): UTC-3 (ADT)
- Figures do not include portion within village of St. Hilaire; No census data available after 2016

Saint-Hilaire is a geographic parish in Madawaska County, New Brunswick, Canada.

For governance purposes it is part of the incorporated rural community of Haut-Madawaska, which is a member of the Northwest Regional Service Commission (NWRSC).

== Origin of name ==
The parish takes its name from the local Roman Catholic church.

== History ==
Saint-Hilaire was erected as Saint Hilaire in 1877 from Madawaska and Saint-François Parishes.

In 1930 Baker Brook Parish was erected from the western part of Saint-Hilaire.

In 1946 Saint-Hilaire was affected by the major reorganisation of Madawaska County parish boundaries.

In 1973 the hyphen was finally added to the legal name.

== Boundaries ==
Saint-Hilaire Parish is bounded:

- on the north by the northern line of Six of the Riceville Settlement, which runs along the northern side of Guerrette Road, beginning on the northwestern corner of a grant about 1.6 kilometres east of the junction of Guerrette Road and Picard Road, then running easterly to the rear line of a tier of grants inland of the Saint John River grants;
- on the east and south, running entirely along grant lines, southwesterly along the tier inland of the Saint John River to its westernmost corner, then southeasterly to the rear of the Saint John River grants, then southerly along the river grants to the junction of Alcide Collin Road and Riceville Road, which is on the northwestern corner of a grant to Alexander Ouellett, then easterly along the Ouellett grant to the international border in the Saint John River, then upriver along the international border;
- on the west, running entirely along grant lines, beginning about 1.2 kilometres upriver of Long Street at the international border on the prolongation of the western line of a grant to Francis R. Martin, then running northerly to Elias Daigle Road, at the northern line of Tier Two of Ouellette Settlement, then westerly about 400 metres to the southwestern corner of a grant to Victori Albert, then northerly across Tiers Three and Four of Ouellette Settlement and Tiers Five and Six of Riceville Settlement to the starting point.

== Communities ==
Communities at least partly within the parish;

- Riceville
- Saint-Hilaire
  - Albertine

== Bodies of water ==
Bodies of water (Note: Not including brooks, ponds or coves.) at least partly in the parish:

- Saint John River

== Islands ==
Islands in the parish:

- Pine Island

== Demographics ==
Parish population total does not include former incorporated village of St. Hilaire

=== Population ===
Canada census – Saint-Hilaire Parish community profile

| | 2016 | 2011 |
| Population | 478 (-2.4% from 2011) | 490 (-7.7% from 2006) |
| Land area | 41.90 km^{2} (16.18 sq mi) | 41.55 km^{2} (16.04 sq mi) |
| Population density | 11.4/km^{2} (30/sq mi) | 11.8/km^{2} (31/sq mi) |
| Median age | 45.15 (M: 44.7, F: 45.5) | 45.5 (M: 43.0, F: 46.7) |
| Private dwellings | 196 (total) | 196 (total) |
| Median household income | $75,008 |

References: 2016 2011

Historical Census Data
Saint-Hilaire Parish, New Brunswick

| Year | Pop. | ±% |
|---|---|---|
| 1991 | 529 | — |
| 1996 | 561 | +6.0% |

| Year | Pop. | ±% |
|---|---|---|
| 2001 | 528 | −5.9% |
| 2006 | 531 | +0.6% |

| Year | Pop. | ±% |
|---|---|---|
| 2011 | 490 | −7.7% |
| 2016 | 478 | −2.4% |

=== Language ===
Canada Census Mother Tongue - Saint-Hilaire Parish, New Brunswick 2011 language data for this area has been suppressed for data quality or confidentiality reasons.
| Census | Total | French | | | English | | | French & English | | | Other | | |
| Year | Responses | Count | Trend | Pop % | Count | Trend | Pop % | Count | Trend | Pop % | Count | Trend | Pop % |
| 2011 | n/a | n/a | 0.0% | 0.00% | n/a | 0.0% | 0.00% | n/a | 0.0% | 0.00% | n/a | 0.0% | 0.00% |
| 2006 | 525 | 525 | ▲7.6% | 100.00% | 0 | ▼100.0% | 0.00% | 0 | 0.0% | 0.00% | 0 | ▼100.0% | 0.00% |
| 2001 | 525 | 485 | ▼10.2% | 92.38% | 30 | ▼14.3% | 5.71% | 0 | ▼100.0% | 0.00% | 10 | ▲ n/a% | 1.90% |
| 1996 | 585 | 540 | n/a | 92.31% | 35 | n/a | 5.98% | 10 | n/a | 1.71% | 0 | n/a | 0.00% |

== Well-known residents ==
- Natasha St-Pier, singer

== See also ==
- List of parishes in New Brunswick
