= Saint-Joseph-de-Madawaska, New Brunswick =

Coordinates: 47.460°N 68.319°W

Location of Saint-Joseph-de-Madawaska in New Brunswick

Saint-Joseph-de-Madawaska is a settlement in New Brunswick.

== See also ==
- List of communities in New Brunswick
