= Lac Baker (New Brunswick) =

Lake in New Brunswick, Canada

- Location within New Brunswick
- Location: Lac-Baker, Madawaska County, New Brunswick / Saint-Jean-de-la-Lande, Témiscouata Regional County Municipality, Quebec
- Coordinates: 47°21′33″N 68°41′12″W
- Primary outflows: Baker Brook
- Basin countries: Canada
- Surface area: 6 km^{2} (2.3 mi^{2})
- Islands: Île de Lac-Baker
- Settlements: Lac-Baker

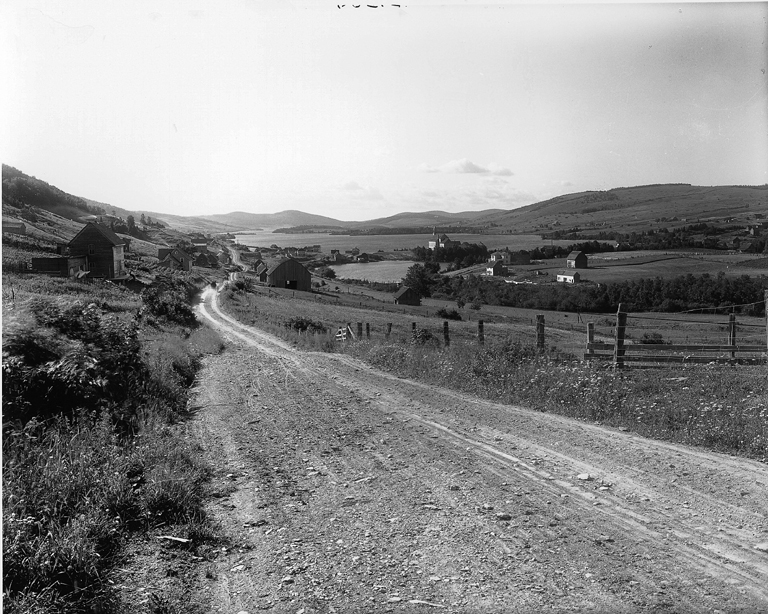
Lake Baker c. 1916

Lac Baker (meaning "Lake Baker") is a Canadian lake with an area of 6 km^{2} located in northwestern New Brunswick on the border with Quebec.

The lake drains to the south through Baker Brook into the Saint John River at the community of Baker Brook.

The northern part of the lake stretches 0.8 kilometres (0.50 mi) to the northwest, in the municipality of Saint-Jean-de-Lande in Quebec province. This lake has a central island with a length of 1.2 kilometres (0.75 mi) and a maximum width of 0.3 kilometres (0.19 mi), counting about fifty chalets.

This lake is supplied in term of water from Kitchen Creek (from the West, i.e. from the Quebec). The mouth of the lake is located on the provincial border in the northwest part of the lake.

The lake is surrounded by a road for cottages arranged around it.

== Toponymy ==
The lake derives its name from John Baker, who founded Baker Brook and subsequently discovered the lake.

== See also ==
- List of lakes of New Brunswick
