= Baker-Brook =

Village of Baker-Brook
- Village
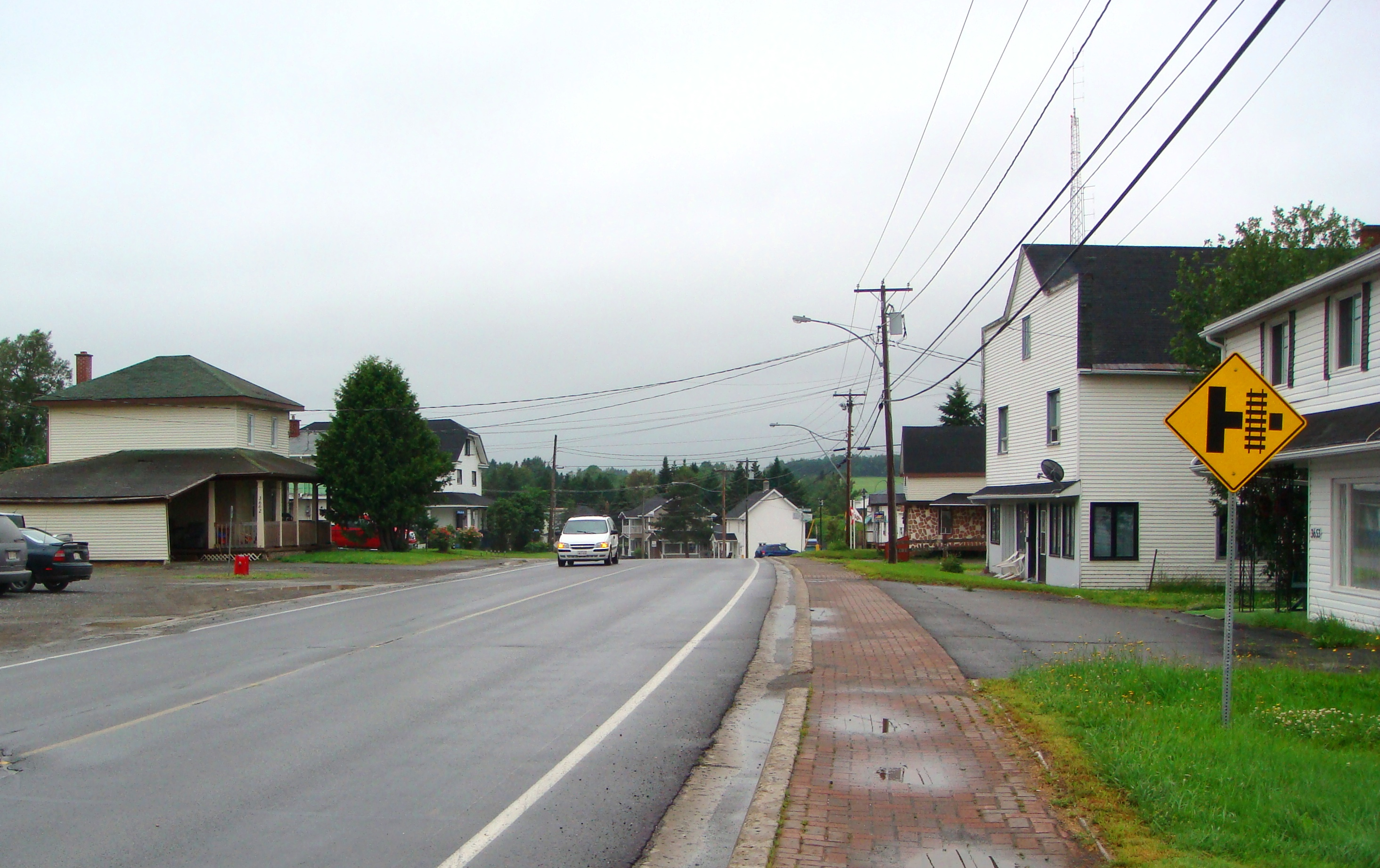

- Location of Baker-Brook, New Brunswick
- Coordinates: 47.3025°N 68.51°W
- Country: Canada
- Province: New Brunswick
- County: Madawaska
- Parish: Baker Brook
- Village Status: 1967
- Electoral Districts Federal: Madawaska—Restigouche
- Provincial: Madawaska-les-Lacs

Government
  - Type: Village Council
  - Mayor: Francine Caron
  - Councillors: List of Members: Cynthia Bélanger; Michel Bouffard; Roland Caron

Area
  - Total: 12.27 km^{2} (4.74 sq mi)

Population (2016)
  - Total: 564
  - Density: 46/km^{2} (120/sq mi)
  - Change 2016-16: ▼3.6%
- Time zone: UTC-4 (AST)
  - Summer (DST): UTC-3 (ADT)
- Area code: 506
- Dwellings: 235
- Median Household Income*: $54,400 CDN
- Access Routes: Route 120
- Median household income, 2015 (all households)

Baker-Brook (2016 population: 564) is a former village in Madawaska County, New Brunswick, Canada.

== Geography ==
It is located on the Saint John River 20 kilometres west of Edmundston.

== History ==
The village takes its name from 19th-century sawmill businessman John Baker.

In 1818, Baker, a native of Maine, settled in the area, along with several other American families. He was dissatisfied with the official borders, and in 1827 declared the village to be capital of the "Republic of Madawaska", a self-proclaimed unrecognized sovereign state being part neither of the United States nor of British America (Canada) although comprising portions of both. Baker was subsequently briefly jailed by the British for treason. A US citizen by birth, John Baker continued to live on his settlement as a somewhat reluctant British subject after Baker Brook was officially declared part of New Brunswick.

== Demographics ==
In the 2021 Census of Population conducted by Statistics Canada, Baker Brook had a population of 555 living in 226 of its 240 total private dwellings, a change of −1.6% from its 2016 population of 564. With a land area of 12.31 km^{2} (4.75 sq mi), it had a population density of 45.1/km^{2} (116.8/sq mi) in 2021.

Population trend

Census	Population	Change (%)
2016	564	▼3.6%
2011	585	▲11.4%
2006	525	▼12.4%
2001	599	▼4.8%
1996	629	▼3.1%
1991	649	N/A

Mother tongue (2016)

Language	Population	Pct (%)
French only	460	93.9%
English only	20	4.1%
Both English and French	10	2.0%
Other languages	0	0%

== Attractions ==
The local Roman Catholic church, houses noted religious artwork, including stained-glass windows from the workshop of Belgian artist José Gaterrath and the Stations of the Cross by the famous Spanish ceramist Jordi Bonet.

== See also ==
- List of communities in New Brunswick
