= Madawaska County, New Brunswick =

County in New Brunswick, Canada

Coordinates: 47°25′17.1″N 68°21′38.2″W

Madawaska
- County
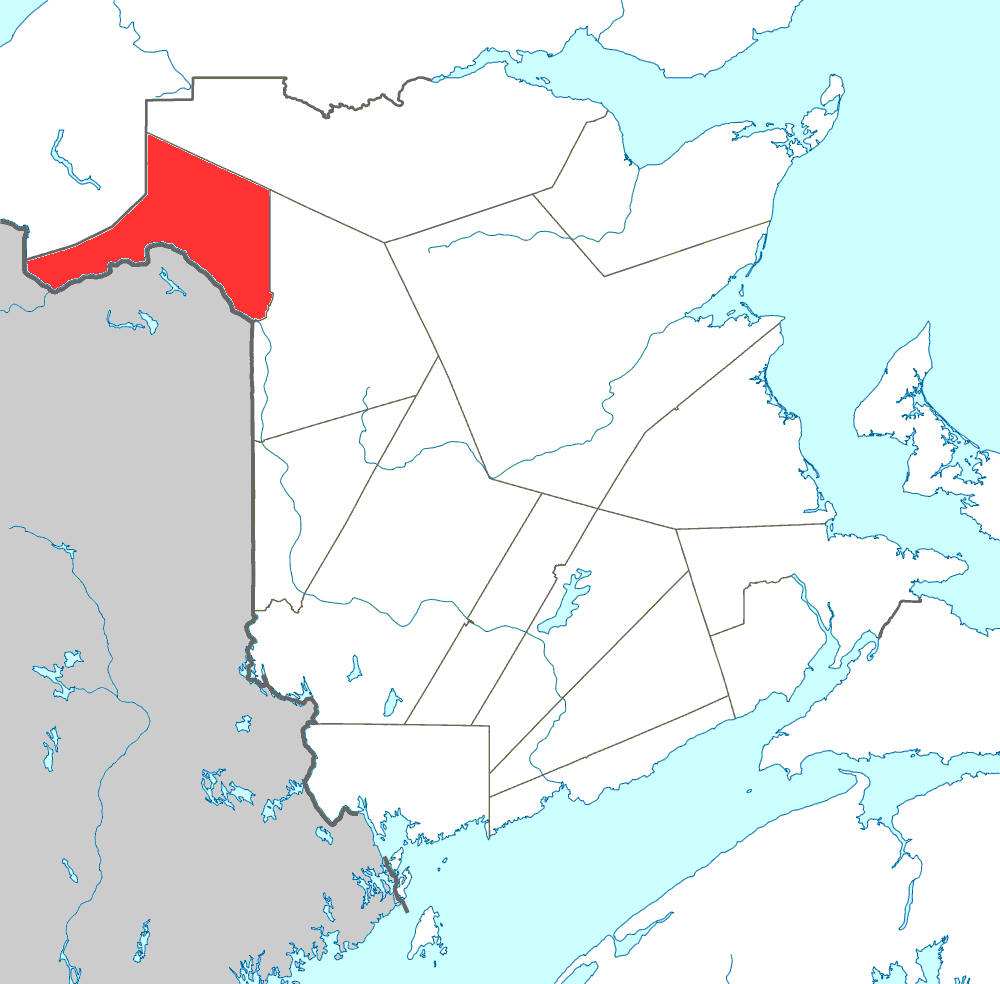
- Location of Madawaska County.
- Country: Canada
- Province: New Brunswick
- Established: 1873

Area
  - Land: 3,454.97 km^{2} (1,333.97 sq mi)

Population (2021)
  - Total: 32,603
  - Density: 9.4/km^{2} (24/sq mi)
  - Change 2016-2021: ▼0.4%
  - Dwellings: 15,851
- Time zone: UTC-4 (AST)
  - Summer (DST): UTC-3 (ADT)
- Area code: 506

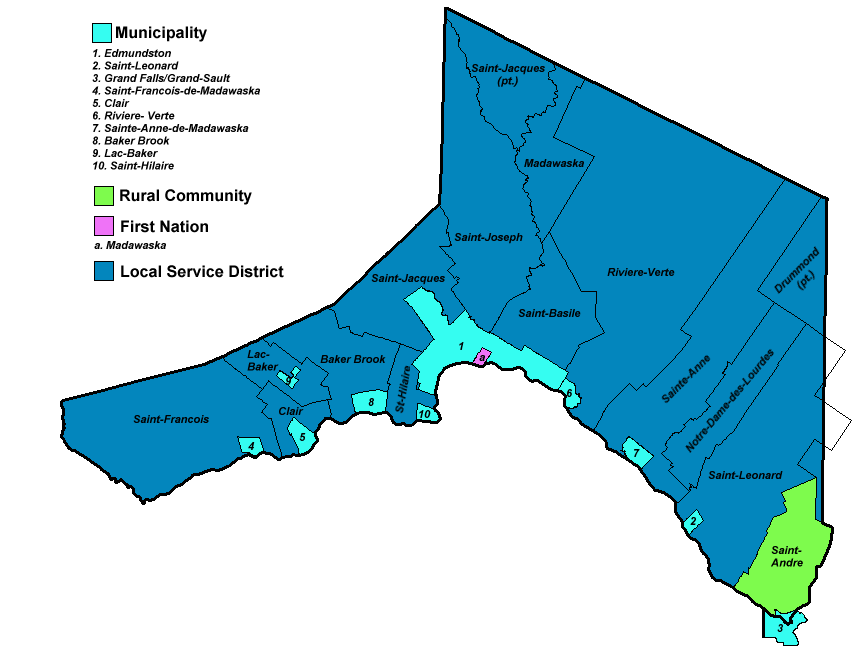
Map of municipal government units in Madawaska County prior to incorporation of rural community of Haut-Madawaska in 2017.

Madawaska County (2021 population 32,603), also known as the "New Brunswick Panhandle", is located in northwestern New Brunswick, Canada. 94% of the county’s population speaks French (88% as first language, 6.1% as second language). Its Francophone population are known as "Brayons." Forestry is the major industry in the county.

== History ==
The first inhabitants of what is now called Madawaska County were the Wolastoqiyik (aka Maliseet), who occupied and used the land along the Saint John River Valley north to the St. Lawrence River and south to the Penobscot River. There is debate concerning the true origin of the word "Madawaska". The earliest settlers were from Quebec. The area was the focus of the bloodless Aroostook War, a border dispute led by businessman and political activist John Baker.

The earliest settlers of the Upper Saint John River Valley have been clearly verified, with census results of the Madawaska region taken in 1820 showing where most families had originated from Quebec.

== Census subdivisions ==
=== Communities ===
There are ten municipalities within Madawaska County (listed by 2016 population):

Official name	Designation	Area km^{2}	Population	Parish
Edmundston	City	106.85	16,580	Madawaska, Saint-Basile, Saint-Jacques, Saint-Joseph
Saint-Léonard	Town	5.22	1,300	Saint-Léonard
Sainte-Anne-de-Madawaska	Village	9.19	957	Sainte-Anne
Clair	Village	10.61	781	Clair
Saint-André	Rural community	8.04	772	Saint-André Parish
Rivière-Verte	Village	6.70	724	Rivière-Verte
Lac-Baker	Village	37.18	690	Lac-Baker
Baker-Brook	Village	12.27	564	Baker Brook
Saint-François-de-Madawaska	Village	6.39	470	Saint-François
Saint-Hilaire	Village	5.68	252	Saint-Hilaire

=== First Nations ===
There is one First Nations reserve in Madawaska County (listed by 2016 population):

Official name	Designation	Area km^{2}	Population	Parish
St. Basile 10	Reserve	3.22	214	Saint-Basile

=== Parishes ===
The county is subdivided into fourteen parishes (listed by 2016 population):

Official name	Area km^{2}	Population	Municipalities or equivalents	Unincorporated communities
Saint-Jacques	299.49	1,596	Edmundston	Ennemond / Grandmaison / Moulin-Morneault / Patrieville / Petite-Rivière-à-la-Truite / Saint-Jacques / St. Joseph Settlement
Saint-Joseph	322.89	1,538	Edmundston	Deuxième-Sault / Francoeur / Lévesque / Rang-des-Bossé / Rang-des-Couturier / Saint-Joseph-de-Madawaska / Sicard / Toussaint / Violette
Saint-André	128.18	1,129	Saint-André	Comeau Ridge / Gaudreau Park / Lévesque Settlement / McManus Siding / Powers Creek / Saint-Amand / Woodville
Saint-Léonard	343.39	975	Saint-Léonard	Bellefleur / Coombes Road / Cyr Junction / Grand-Ruisseau / Martin Siding / Poitras / Rang-des-Bourgoin / Saint-Léonard-Parent
Sainte-Anne	368.89	964	Sainte-Anne-de-Madawaska	Fourche-à-Clark / Miller Line Cache / Prime / Rang-des-Deschêne / Ringuette Settlement / Siegas / Siegas Lake Settlement / Sirois
Rivière-Verte	715.86	711	Rivière-Verte	Beardsley Depot / Davis Mill / Montagne-de-la-Croix / Montagne-des-Roy / Rang-des-Hubert
Saint-François	344.59	606	Haut-Madawaska	Concession-des-Jaunes / Concession-des-Viel / Connors / Lac-Unique / Little River Mills / Mouth of St. Francis / Pelletiers Mill / Val Oakes
Saint-Basile	129.61	592	Edmundston; St. Basile 10 (native reserve)	Boniface Bridge / Green River Settlement / Jalbert / Maillet / Montagne-des-Therrien / Rang-des-Lavoie /
Saint-Hilaire	41.90	478	Haut-Madawaska	Riceville
Clair	43.92	283	Haut-Madawaska	Caron Brook / Concession-des-Lang / Concession-des-Vasseur / Crockett / Les Rapides
Baker Brook	125.17	275	Haut-Madawaska	Concession-de-Baker-Brook / Concession-des-Ouellette / Rang-des-Morneault / Rang-Saint-Joseph / Val-Lambert / Val-Nadeau
Notre-Dame-de-Lourdes	187.18	275		Durette Settlement / Flemming / Harrison Brook Settlement / La Montagne / Lower Siegas / Notre-Dame-de-Lourdes
Madawaska	173.18	10	Edmundston; Haut-Madawaska	
Lac Baker	24.30	5	Lac-Baker; Haut-Madawaska	Boundary / Portage-du-Lac / Rang-des-Collin / Saint-Castin / Pelletiers Mill / Soucy

== Demographics ==
Historical Census Data - Madawaska County, New Brunswick
Year	Pop.	±%
1991	36,554	—
1996	36,814	+0.7%
2001	35,611	−3.3%
2006	34,071	−4.3%
2011	33,422	−1.9%
2016	32,741	−2.0%

As a census division in the 2021 Census of Population conducted by Statistics Canada, Madawaska County had a population of 32,603 living in 14,905 of its 15,851 total private dwellings, a change of −0.4% from its 2016 population of 32,741. With a land area of 3,454.97 km^{2} (1,333.97 sq mi), it had a population density of 9.4/km^{2} (24.4/sq mi) in 2021.

Canada census – Madawaska community profile

	2021	2016	2011
Population	32,603 (-0.4% from 2016)	32,741 (-2.0% from 2011)	33,422 (-1.9% from 2006)
Land area	3,454.97 km^{2} (1,333.97 sq mi)	3,461.89 km^{2} (1,336.64 sq mi)	3,463.05 km^{2} (1,337.09 sq mi)
Population density	9.4/km^{2} (24/sq mi)	9.5/km^{2} (25/sq mi)	9.7/km^{2} (25/sq mi)
Median age	52.0 (M: 50.8, F: 53.2)	50.1 (M: 49.0, F: 51.0)	47.3 (M: 46.3, F: 48.1)
Private dwellings	15,851 (total) 14,905 (occupied)	15,774 (total)	15,514 (total)
Median household income	$62,400	$53,146	$47,385

References: 2021 2016 2011

=== Language ===
Canada Census Mother Tongue - Madawaska County, New Brunswick
Census	Total	French			English			French & English			Non-official languages		
Year	Responses	Count	Trend	Pop %	Count	Trend	Pop %	Count	Trend	Pop %	Count	Trend	Pop %
2016	32,105	29,765	▼2.5%	92.71%	1,645	▲7.5%	5.12%	372	▲24.0%	1.17%	320	▲77.8%	1.00%
2011	32,510	30,500	▼2.2%	93.82%	1,530	▼8.1%	4.71%	300	▲13.2%	0.92%	180	▼54.4%	0.55%
2006	33,510	31,185	▼4.7%	93.06%	1,665	▲6.1%	4.97%	265	▼26.4%	0.79%	395	▲119.4%	1.18%
2001	34,845	32,735	▼3.8%	93.94%	1,570	▼14.2%	4.51%	360	▲14.3%	1.03%	180	▲44.0%	0.52%
1996	36,300	34,030	n/a	93.75%	1,830	n/a	5.04%	315	n/a	0.87%	125	n/a	0.34%

== Access routes ==
Highways and numbered routes that run through the county, including external routes that start or finish at the county limits:

- Highways
  - Route 2 (TCH)
  - Route 17
- Principal Routes
  - Route 120
  - Route 144
- Secondary Routes:
  - Route 205
  - Route 215
- External Routes:
  - U.S. Route 1
  - Quebec Autoroute 85 (TCH)
  - Quebec Route 289

== See also ==
- Republic of Madawaska
- Brayon
- List of communities in New Brunswick
