= Caron Brook, New Brunswick =

Community in New Brunswick, Canada

Coordinates: 47.289°N 68.584°W

Location of Caron Brook in New Brunswick

Caron Brook is a community in the Canadian province of New Brunswick.

== See also ==
- List of communities in New Brunswick
