= List of parishes in New Brunswick =

The Canadian province of New Brunswick is divided by the Territorial Division Act into 152 geographic parishes, (Note: Plus the Cities of Saint John and Fredericton, and the Town of Grand Falls, although Fredericton and Grand Falls have both expanded their borders beyond those listed in the TDA.) units which had political significance as subdivisions of counties until the Municipalities Act of 1966. (Note: County municipalities were dissolved; 12 quasimunicipal commissions and 63 local improvement districts were converted to villages; and 85 parishes plus 7 former school districts with fire protection and/or other services were made local service districts.) Parishes still exist in law and include any municipality, rural community, or regional municipality within their borders. They provided convenient boundaries for electoral districts (Note: Parishes were used to define the boundaries of provincial electoral districts in reports from 1974-1993; 2006 was the first report to use local service districts to define riding boundaries.) and organising delivery of government services for some time after 1966 but were gradually supplanted for such purposes by local service districts (LSDs), which better represent communities of interest. Local governance reforms on 1 January 2023 abolished the local service district as a unit of governance but this did not affect the existence of geographic parishes.

Parishes are still used (Note: As of July 2021, by more than a dozen Acts and more than fifty Regulations.) to describe legal boundaries for health administration judicial matters, agricultural boards, and some other entities; highway, fisheries and wildlife, community planning, and some other departments use parishes for rural locations, while some forms still use parishes as the only alternative to municipalities when entering one's community.

Provincial government guidelines require capitalising the word parish only if it follows the specific part of the name: e.g., Hopewell Parish but the parish of Hopewell.

== Other uses of the term parish ==
Confusion is caused by three other government uses of the term parish.

- The provincial government used LSDs to deliver services to unincorporated parts of the province. 128 LSDs (Note: Two more parish LSDs - North Esk and South Esk - used different spellings than the parish they were named after; Saint Mary used the parish's old name in English but the modern Sainte-Marie in French.) had a name identical to the parish they were at least partly in, but only 26 (Note: 1 in Albert County, 7 in Charlotte, 1 in Kent, 7 in Kings, 2 in Madawaska, 2 in Queens, 1 in Saint John, 1 in Sunbury, 4 in York.) had the same boundaries as the parish they were named after.
- The provincial government divides the province into taxing authorities for the purpose of calculating and collecting property taxes. Municipalities, rural communities, and regional municipalities can all have multiple taxing authorities. Taxing authorities follow property lines rather than municipal or parish boundaries (Note: Examples include several properties in the village of Eel River Crossing being taxed as part of the village of Charlo in 2014 and voting maps released by the Town of Hampton for its shared recreation services in 2016, including the LSD of the parish of Springfield.) and often shared the name of an LSD they partially overlapped.
- Statistics Canada uses the term parish for any Census subdivision that is not an incorporated municipality, rural community, regional municipality or Indian reserve. Only 49 CSDs have the same borders as the parish they are named after. (Note: 52 parishes have no municipality within their limits; 3 of these have Indian reserves.)

== List ==
142 of New Brunswick's parishes are used as the basis of census subdivisions by Statistics Canada. (Note: Figure derived from counting parishes still used as Census subdivisions.) Unless noted, all figures below are for census subdivisions, which do not include areas within municipalities, incorporated rural communities, or Indian reserves. Revised census figures based on the 2023 local governance reforms have not been released.

Name	County	Population (2021)	Population (2016)	Change (%)	Area (km²)	Population density
Aberdeen	Carleton	812	781	▲4.0	444.88	1.8
Acadieville	Kent	752	709	▲6.1	332.08	2.3
Addington	Restigouche	698	656	▲6.4	933.00	0.7
Allardville	Gloucester	1,949	2,032	▼4.1	654.60	3.0
Alma	Albert	5	5	Steady	222.74	0.0
Alnwick	Northumberland	3,615	3,640	▼0.7	668.84	5.4
Andover	Victoria	879	891	▼1.3	123.42	7.1
Baker Brook	Madawaska	not profiled after 2016				
Balmoral	Restigouche	309	278	▲11.2	1,088.01	0.3
Bathurst	Gloucester	4,761	4,797	▼0.8	1,502.74	3.2
Beresford	Gloucester	6,226	6,248	▼0.4	455.61	13.7
Blackville	Northumberland	1,996	2,028	▼1.6	823.93	2.4
Blissfield	Northumberland	491	451	▲8.9	1,235.57	0.4
Blissville	Sunbury	777	819	▼5.1	341.74	2.3
Botsford	Westmorland	1,120	1,058	▲5.9	304.62	3.7
Bright	York	3,317	3,289	▲0.9	403.73	8.2
Brighton	Carleton	1,596	1,735	▼8.0	509.30	3.1
Brunswick	Queens	224	203	▲10.3	703.20	0.3
Burton	Sunbury	5,176	5,119	▲1.1	258.39	20.0
Cambridge	Queens	684	647	▲5.7	113.17	6.0
Campobello (Note: The local service district of the parish of Campobello was incorporated as a rural community on 1 November 2010; the parish itself still legally exists and appears in the Territorial Division Act. The data here is for the rural community of Campobello Island.)	Charlotte	949	872	▲8.8	39.59	24.0
Canning	Queens	1,028	924	▲11.3	173.25	5.9
Canterbury	York	552	525	▲5.1	550.7	1.0
Caraquet	Gloucester	1,261	1,337	▼5.7	109.32	11.5
Cardwell	Kings	1,401	1,353	▲3.5	311.87	4.5
Carleton	Kent	764	708	▲7.9	435.23	1.8
Chatham	Northumberland	527	511	▲3.1	22.70	23.2
Chipman	Queens	853	913	▼6.6	483.45	1.8
Clair	Madawaska	not profiled after 2016				
Clarendon	Charlotte	66	63	▲4.8	492.11	0.1
Colborne	Restigouche	266	227	▲17.2	753.38	0.4
Coverdale	Albert	4,766	4,466	▲6.7	236.00	20.2
Dalhousie	Restigouche	1,090	1,067	▲2.2	62.62	17.4
Denmark	Victoria	1,424	1,471	▼3.2	751.08	1.9
Derby	Northumberland	938	976	▼3.9	61.00	15.4
Dorchester	Westmorland	438	429	▲2.1	90.13	4.9
Douglas (Note: 2016 figure adjusted for subsequent change in boundaries.)	York	5,935	5,703	▲1.2	1,446.95	4.3
Drummond	Victoria	2,095	2,157	▼2.9	1,013.66	2.1
Dufferin	Charlotte	565	573	▼1.4	12.34	45.8
Dumbarton	Charlotte	346	335	▲3.3	373.20	0.9
Dumfries	York	420	356	▲18.0	298.51	1.4
Dundas	Kent	4,332	3,914	▲10.7	172.32	25.1
Durham	Restigouche	950	1,076	▼11.7	409.78	2.3
Eldon	Restigouche	674	672	▼5.9	1,681.46	0.4
Elgin	Albert	1,064	892	▲19.3	519.54	2.0
Gagetown	Queens	324	311	▲4.2	234.58	1.4
Gladstone	Sunbury	486	452	▲7.5	362.08	1.3
Glenelg	Northumberland	1,532	1,560	▼1.8	504.78	3.0
Gordon	Victoria	1,559	1,493	▲4.4	1,430.19	1.1
Grand Falls	Victoria	1,077	1,109	▼2.9	158.09	6.8
Grand Manan	Charlotte	139	145	▼4.1	5.96	23.3
Greenwich	Kings	1,126	1,058	▲6.4	114.56	9.8
Grimmer	Restigouche	not profiled after 2016				
Hammond	Kings	276	251	▲10.0	244.24	1.1
Hampstead	Queens	288	277	▲4.0	212.39	1.4
Hampton	Kings	2,969	2,809	▲5.7	121.24	24.5
Harcourt	Kent	346	346	Steady	1,169.20	0.3
Hardwicke	Northumberland	2,203	2,201	▲0.1	275.95	8.0
Harvey	Albert	358	333	▲7.5	276.85	1.3
Havelock	Kings	1,042	1,061	▼1.8	349.22	3.0
Hillsborough	Albert	1,397	1,308	▲6.8	304.03	4.6
Hopewell	Albert	597	647	▼7.7	149.14	4.0
Huskisson	Kent	5	15	▼66.7	369.31	0.0
Inkerman	Gloucester	2,373	2,366	▲0.3	107.63	22.0
Johnston	Queens	638	560	▲13.9	360.87	1.8
Kars	Kings	377	325	▲16.0	75.54	5.0
Kent	Carleton	1,966	2,153	▼8.7	839.76	2.3
Kingsclear	York	2,839	2,822	▲0.6	150.11	18.9
Kingston	Kings	3,202	2,913	▲9.9	200.41	16.0
Lac Baker	Madawaska	not profiled after 2016				
Lepreau	Charlotte	803	707	▲13.6	209.52	3.8
Lincoln	Sunbury	7,519	7,177	▲4.8	159.44	47.2
Lorne	Victoria	313	464	▼32.5	1,632.21	0.2
Ludlow (Note: The local service district of Parish of Ludlow was replaced on 10 March 1971 by the new local service district of Upper Miramichi, which also included part of the local service district of the parish of Stanley; Upper Miramichi was incorporated as a rural community on 17 March 2008. The parish itself still legally exists and appears in the Territorial Division Act.)	Northumberland	not profiled after 2011				
Madawaska	Madawaska	0	10	▼100.0	173.42	0.0
Manners Sutton	York	1,920	1,777	▲8.0	524.75	3.7
Maugerville	Sunbury	1,772	1,831	▼3.2	919.94	1.9
McAdam	York	61	73	▼16.4	534.77	0.1
Moncton	Westmorland	10,704	9,811	▲9.1	564.16	19.0
Musquash	Saint John	1,253	1,194	▲4.9	233.06	5.4
Nelson	Northumberland	929	952	▼2.4	353.68	2.6
New Bandon	Gloucester	1,200	1,214	▼1.2	359.28	3.3
New Maryland	York	2,806	2,606	▲7.7	375.02	7.5
Newcastle	Northumberland	1,149	1,136	▲1.1	578.70	2.0
North Lake	York	282	233	▲21.0	439.6	0.6
Northampton	Carleton	1,875	1,724	▲8.8	243.31	7.7
Northesk	Northumberland	2,169	2,263	▼4.2	3,346.76	0.6
Northfield	Sunbury	577	620	▼6.9	303.27	1.9
Norton	Kings	1,325	1,301	▲1.8	144.77	9.2
Notre-Dame-de-Lourdes	Madawaska	253	275	▼8.0	186.30	1.4
Paquetville	Gloucester	2,250	2,329	▼3.4	220.42	10.2
Peel	Carleton	1,198	1,196	▲0.2	112.74	10.6
Pennfield	Charlotte	2,222	2,170	▲2.4	363.75	6.1
Perth	Victoria	1,047	1,082	▼3.2	318.10	3.3
Petersville	Queens	710	681	▲4.3	589.95	1.2
Prince William	York	1,083	930	▲16.5	284.39	3.8
Queensbury	York	1,237	1,174	▲5.4	294.35	4.2
Richibucto	Kent	2,085	1,872	▲11.4	249.21	8.4
Richmond	Carleton	1,456	1,303	▲11.7	258.80	5.6
Rivière-Verte	Madawaska	657	711	▼7.6	715.72	0.9
Rogersville	Northumberland	1,072	1,102	▼2.7	326.27	3.3
Rothesay	Kings	342	325	▲5.2	7.26	47.1
Sackville	Westmorland	1,204	1,182	▲1.9	578.9	2.1
Saint-André (Note: Figures are for rural community of Saint-André, which includes all of parish not included in town of Grand Falls.)	Madawaska	1,794	1,901	▼5.6	136.19	13.2
Saint Andrews	Charlotte	550	553	▼0.5	24.27	22.7
Sainte-Anne	Madawaska	936	964	▼2.9	368.76	2.5
Saint-Basile	Madawaska	736	592	▲24.3	129.96	5.7
Saint-Charles	Kent	2,024	1,997	▲1.4	175.07	11.6
Saint Croix	Charlotte	648	657	▼1.4	78.60	8.2
Saint David	Charlotte	1,470	1,529	▼3.9	190.39	7.7
Saint-François	Madawaska	not profiled after 2016				
Saint George	Charlotte	2,495	2,341	▲6.6	500.05	5.0
Saint-Hilaire	Madawaska	not profiled after 2016				
Saint-Isidore	Gloucester	1,312	1,361	▼3.6	173.14	7.6
Saint-Jacques	Madawaska	1,652	1,596	▲3.5	298.44	5.5
Saint James	Charlotte	1,024	1,186	▼13.7	552.90	1.9
Saint-Joseph	Madawaska	1,549	1,538	▲0.7	321.42	4.8
Saint-Léonard	Madawaska	858	975	▼12.0	344.85	2.5
Saint-Louis	Kent	1,760	1,802	▼2.3	258.65	6.8
Sainte-Marie (Note: The official name is Sainte-Marie in both languages.)	Kent	1,991	1,972	▲1.0	238.32	8.4
Saint Martins	Saint John	1,177	1,132	▲4.0	629.00	1.9
Saint Marys	York	5,084	4,837	▲5.1	751.90	6.8
Saint Patrick	Charlotte	710	689	▲3.0	236.59	3.0
Saint-Paul	Kent	877	842	▲4.2	228.41	3.8
Saint-Quentin	Restigouche	1,504	1,532	▼1.8	2,474.01	0.6
Saint Stephen	Charlotte	1,671	1,839	▼9.1	102.83	16.3
Salisbury	Westmorland	3,377	3,388	▼0.3	874.00	3.9
Saumarez	Gloucester	not profiled after 2016				
Shediac	Westmorland	5,144	4,789	▲7.4	178.79	28.8
Sheffield	Sunbury	888	809	▲9.8	271.29	3.3
Shippegan	Gloucester	4,781	4,800	▼0.4	204.52	23.4
Simonds	Carleton	514	473	▲8.7	75.57	6.8
Simonds	Saint John	3,913	3,843	▲1.8	281.06	13.9
Southampton	York	1,497	1,484	▲0.9	446.85	3.4
Southesk	Northumberland	1,666	1,694	▼1.7	2,462.60	0.7
Springfield	Kings	1,641	1,525	▲7.6	248.53	6.6
Stanley	York	920	832	▲10.6	1,218.38	0.8
Studholm	Kings	3,527	3,522	▲0.1	448.98	7.9
Sussex	Kings	2,579	2,516	▲2.5	243.99	10.6
Upham	Kings	1,357	1,269	▲6.9	189.21	7.2
Wakefield	Carleton	2,722	2,767	▼1.6	196.31	13.9
Waterborough	Queens	903	847	▲6.6	443.16	2.0
Waterford	Kings	491	469	▲4.7	221.27	2.2
Weldford	Kent	1,335	1,333	▲0.2	607.56	2.2
Wellington	Kent	3,292	3,079	▲6.9	184.80	17.8
West Isles	Charlotte	718	797	▼9.9	38.32	18.7
Westfield	Kings	2,114	1,962	▲7.7	295.34	7.2
Westmorland	Westmorland	997	908	▲9.8	173.27	5.8
Wickham	Queens	409	427	▼4.2	160.54	2.5
Wicklow	Carleton	1,591	1,697	▼6.2	195.50	8.1
Wilmot	Carleton	969	1,022	▼5.2	191.40	5.1
Woodstock	Carleton	2,219	2,178	▲1.9	194.83	11.4
Total parishes (Note: These totals are not inclusive of any portions within cities, town, villages, incorporated rural communities, regional municipality, or Indian reserves. Totals are calculated; non-CSDs are not included.)		227,326	222,338	▲2.2	63,325.23	3.6

== Former and renamed parishes ==
Name	County	Notes
Fredericton	York	Incorporated as a city in 1848 but still appears in the Territorial Division Act.
Lancaster	Saint John	Amalgamated with the City of Saint John in 1967.
Liverpool	Kent	Original name of Richibucto Parish, changed in 1832.
Palmerston	Kent	Original name of Saint-Louis Parish, changed in 1866.
Portland	Saint John	Amalgamated with the City of Saint John in 1889.
Saint Mary	Kent	Original name of Sainte-Marie Parish, changed in 1973. Still in use for some purposes.

== See also ==
- Demographics of New Brunswick
- Geography of New Brunswick
- List of cities in New Brunswick
- List of municipal amalgamations in New Brunswick
- List of municipalities in New Brunswick
- List of towns in New Brunswick
- List of villages in New Brunswick
- Rural community
