= Administrative divisions of New Brunswick =

Local governance in New Brunswick

New Brunswick local governance entities

The Canadian province of New Brunswick is divided into 89 local entities, consisting of 77 local governments and 12 rural districts.

A local government can be a city, town, village, regional municipality or rural community, mainly according to population. Cities generally provide more services than smaller entities. Services include certain transportation, environmental, security, and recreational and culture services.

Ninety-five per cent of the population lives in a city, town, village, regional municipality, or rural community and can vote to elect responsible local government. Parts of the province not covered by these local governments are divided into rural districts. These are sparsely populated unincorporated areas. Each district elects councillors to form an advisory committee to advise the minister on local matters.

Twelve regional service commissions provide services over larger areas.

== History ==
In 1784 New Brunswick was created via the partitioning of the Colony of Nova Scotia and divided into the counties of NB, which were in turn divided into parishes. By the 1960s the province was a patchwork of incorporated cities, towns, villages, local improvement districts, and local administrative commissions. Under this system, many public services including healthcare, social services, and education were provided by county government. Underfunded poor counties were stuck in a "perpetual cycle of poverty".

In response, Liberal premier Louis Robichaud introduced the Equal Opportunity Program. This reformed municipal taxation, and via the 1966 Municipalities Act eliminated county governments and led to the subsequent centralization of many of their powers. In 1967 counties ceased to exist as government units and nonmunicipal incorporated bodies (Note: These were commissions, which received grants from the province and had some administrative powers, and local improvement districts, which were formed to administer purely local services like sewage systems but had no significant powers.) were converted to villages. A new governance unit, the local service district (LSD), was created to administer local services like fire departments in some rural areas. (Note: Large areas of the province received only the most basic provincial services like highway maintenance; these were not part of the local service district system.) The new villages were given the same municipal powers as towns and cities. Existing cities and towns were not changed, while existing villages (Note: Port Elgin and the township of McAdam, which was a village for municipal purposes.) were converted to the new village model.

Regional service commissions were added in 2012.

The 2023 New Brunswick local governance reform was an overhaul of the system as follows:

- 104 local governments were reduced to 77, primarily by combining existing municipalities. Few municipalities were unaffected by the changes, with some new municipalities created by combining LSDs.
- Local service districts were dissolved. Some joined existing or new municipalities or rural communities, while remaining LSD areas were combined to form 12 rural districts corresponding to the regional service commissions. A significant number of LSDs were split between municipalities and rural districts.
- Regional service commissions assumed increased powers; many had their boundaries adjusted.
- Land use planning was improved.
- Financing local governance finance was reformed.

== Local governance divisions ==
| Name | Status | Regional service commission | Entity number |
|---|---|---|---|
| Acadian Peninsula | rural district | Acadian Peninsula | 4 |
| Alnwick | rural community | Greater Miramichi | 20 |
| Arcadia | village | Capital Region | 66 |
| Bathurst | city | Chaleur | 12 |
| Belledune | village | Chaleur | 10 |
| Beaurivage | town | Kent | 26 |
| Beausoleil | rural community | Kent | 31 |
| Bois-Joli | village | Restigouche | 8 |
| Butternut Valley | rural community | Kings | 79 |
| Campbellton | city | Restigouche | 7 |
| Campobello Island | rural community | Southwest | 55 |
| Cap-Acadie | town | Southeast | 38 |
| Capital Region | rural district | Capital Region | 11 |
| Caraquet | town | Acadian Peninsula | 14 |
| Carleton North | town | Western Valley | 76 |
| Central York | rural community | Capital Region | 70 |
| Chaleur | rural district | Chaleur | 3 |
| Champdoré | town | Kent | 30 |
| Dieppe | city | Southeast | 36 |
| Doaktown | village | Greater Miramichi | 23 |
| Eastern Charlotte | rural community | Southwest | 53 |
| Edmundston | city | Northwest | 2 |
| Five Rivers | village | Kent | 28 |
| Fredericton | city | Capital Region | 69 |
| Fredericton Junction | village | Capital Region | 60 |
| Fundy | rural district | Fundy | 9 |
| Fundy Albert | village | Southeast | 42 |
| Fundy Shores | rural community | Southwest | 52 |
| Fundy-St. Martins | village | Fundy | 46 |
| Grand Bay-Westfield | town | Fundy | 51 |
| Grand-Bouctouche | town | Kent | 29 |
| Grand Falls | town | Northwest | 4 |
| Grand Lake | village | Capital Region | 67 |
| Grand Manan | village | Southwest | 54 |
| Greater Miramichi | rural district | Greater Miramichi | 5 |
| Hampton | town | Fundy | 47 |
| Hanwell | rural community | Capital Region | 62 |
| Hartland | town | Western Valley | 74 |
| Harvey | rural community | Capital Region | 59 |
| Haut-Madawaska | town | Northwest | 1 |
| Hautes-Terres | town | Acadian Peninsula | 17 |
| Heron Bay | town | Restigouche | 9 |
| Île-de-Lamèque | town | Acadian Peninsula | 15 |
| Kedgwick | rural community | Northwest | 6 |
| Kent | rural district | Kent | 6 |
| Kings | rural district | Kings | 8 |
| Lakeland Ridges | village | Western Valley | 72 |
| Maple Hills | rural community | Southeast | 32 |
| Memramcook | village | Southeast | 41 |
| Miramichi | city | Greater Miramichi | 21 |
| Miramichi River Valley | rural community | Greater Miramichi | 22 |
| McAdam | village | Southwest | 58 |
| Moncton | city | Southeast | 34 |
| Nackawic-Millville | rural community | Capital Region | 71 |
| Nashwaak | rural community | Capital Region | 68 |
| Neguac | village | Acadian Peninsula | 19 |
| New Maryland | village | Capital Region | 64 |
| Northwest | rural district | Northwest | 1 |
| Nouvelle-Arcadie | village | Kent | 25 |
| Oromocto | town | Capital Region | 65 |
| Quispamsis | town | Fundy | 48 |
| Restigouche | rural district | Restigouche | 2 |
| Rivière-du-Nord | town | Acadian Peninsula | 13 |
| Rothesay | town | Fundy | 49 |
| Saint Andrews | town | Southwest | 56 |
| Saint John | city | Fundy | 50 |
| Saint-Quentin | town | Northwest | 5 |
| Salisbury | town | Southeast | 33 |
| Shediac | town | Southeast | 37 |
| Shippagan | town | Acadian Peninsula | 16 |
| Southeast | rural district | Southeast | 7 |
| Southern Victoria | village | Western Valley | 77 |
| Southwest | rural district | Southwest | 10 |
| St. Stephen | town | Southwest | 57 |
| Strait Shores | rural community | Southeast | 39 |
| Sunbury-York South | rural community | Capital Region | 63 |
| Sussex | town | Kings | 44 |
| Tantramar | town | Southeast | 40 |
| Three Rivers | village | Southeast | 43 |
| Tobique Valley | village | Western Valley | 78 |
| Tracadie | regional municipality | Acadian Peninsula | 18 |
| Tracy | village | Capital Region | 61 |
| Upper Miramichi | rural community | Greater Miramichi | 24 |
| Vallée-des-Rivières | town | Northwest | 3 |
| Valley Waters | village | Kings | 45 |
| Western Valley | rural district | Western Valley | 12 |
| Woodstock | town | Western Valley | 73 |

== Other jurisdictions of the province ==
=== Census areas ===
Census Canada divides the province into census divisions and subdivisions, population centres, and economic regions (Fredericton-Moncton-Saint John, Madawaska-Charlotte, Restigouche-Albert).

=== Health authorities ===
The New Brunswick Department of Health funds two regional health authorities: Horizon Health Network and Vitalité Health Network. The province is divided into seven health regions, with Region 1 being managed under both networks; regions 2, 3, and 7 under the Horizon network; and regions 4, 5, and 6 under the Vitalité network.

=== Protected areas ===
- National Parks (Fundy and Kouchibouguac) and provincial parks.
- Canadian Heritage Rivers System: the Saint John, St. Croix, and Restigouche rivers.
- National Wildlife Areas and National Migratory Bird Sanctuaries administered by the Canadian Wildlife Service.
- Protected Natural Areas legally protected under the provincial Protected Natural Areas Act.

=== Indian reserves ===
There are 15 First Nations in New Brunswick.

=== Canadian Forces bases ===
There is one Canadian Forces Base, CFB Gagetown.

== See also ==
fr:Gouvernance locale au Nouveau-Brunswick (local government in NB)
