= List of municipalities in New Brunswick =

Location of New Brunswick in Canada

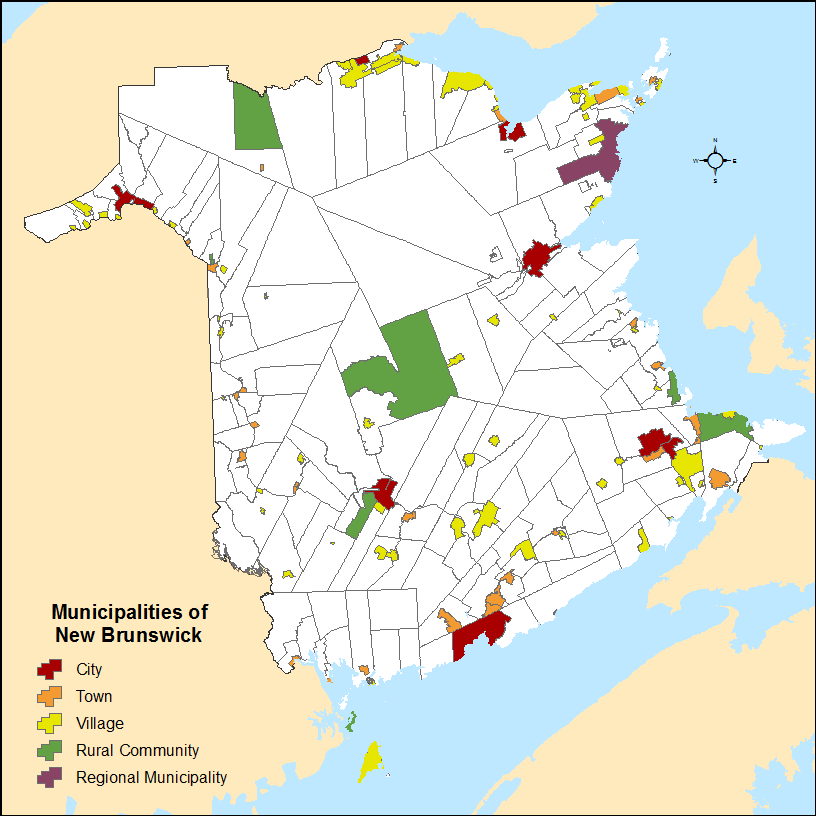
Distribution of New Brunswick's 107 municipalities and rural communities by municipal status type, before 2023 reforms

New Brunswick is the eighth-most populous province in Canada, with 775,610 residents as of the 2021 census, and the third-smallest province by land area, at 71,248.50 km^{2} (27,509.20 mi^{2}). New Brunswick's 104 municipalities, as of 2021, covered only 10.9% of the province's land mass but were home to 69.5% of its population.

Local governments in New Brunswick may be incorporated under the Local Governance Act of 2017. Local governments include municipalities – cities, towns, and villages – as well as rural communities and regional municipalities. Municipal governments are led by elected councils and are responsible for the delivery of services such as civic administration, land use planning, emergency measures, policing, road, and garbage collection.

In 1785, Saint John became the first community in what would eventually become Canada to be incorporated as a city. Moncton is New Brunswick's largest municipality by population, with 79,470 residents, and Saint John is the largest urban municipality by land area, at 315.59 km^{2} (121.85 mi^{2}). As of 2021, approximately one-third of the residents of New Brunswick did not live in municipalities but resided in local service districts, which were unincorporated communities administered by the Minister of Environment and Local Government and had no local government of their own.

Beginning in 2021, the government of New Brunswick launched a local governance reform, which eventually saw the local service districts dissolved in 2023, with their territory assigned to cities, towns, villages, rural communities or rural districts. The same reforms reduced the number of municipalities to 77.

Prior to the reforms, New Brunswick had 8 cities, 26 towns, 61 villages, 1 regional municipality, and 8 rural communities. Following the reforms, New Brunswick has 8 cities, 30 towns, 21 villages, 17 rural communities, and 1 regional municipality.

== Cities ==
The Lieutenant-Governor in Council may incorporate an area as a city under the Local Governance Act if it has a population of at least 10,000. Cities already in existence on January 1, 1967, continue to be incorporated regardless of population. New Brunswick had eight cities that had a cumulative population of 293,928 in the 2021 Census. Moncton is New Brunswick's largest city by population with 79,470 residents and Saint John is the largest by land area 315.59 km^{2} (121.85 mi^{2}) respectively. Campbellton is New Brunswick's smallest city by population and land area with 7,047 residents and 18.57 km^{2} (7.17 mi^{2}).

== Towns ==
The Lieutenant-Governor in Council may incorporate an area as a town under the Local Governance Act if it has a population of at least 1,500 and provides a level of services that the Minister of Local Government and Local Governance Reform considers appropriate. Towns already in existence on January 1, 1967, continue to be incorporated regardless of population.

Prior to implementation of the 2023 local governance reforms, New Brunswick had 26 towns that had a cumulative population of 133,350 in the 2021 Census. New Brunswick's largest town by population is Riverview with 20,584 residents and largest town by area was Sackville with a land area of 73.91 km^{2} (28.54 mi^{2}). New Brunswick's smallest town by population was Hartland with 933 residents and the smallest by land area was Saint-Quentin at 4.24 km^{2} (1.64 mi^{2}). The number of towns increased to 30 in 2023 upon implementation of the local governance reforms.

== Villages ==
Prior to implementation of the 2023 local governance reforms, New Brunswick's 61 villages had a cumulative population of 71,186 as of the 2021 Census. New Brunswick's largest village by population was Memramcook with 5,029 residents and largest village by area was Belledune with a land area of 189.18 km^{2} (73.04 mi^{2}). New Brunswick's smallest village by population was Meductic with 180 residents and the smallest by land area was Saint-Louis de Kent at 1.98 km^{2} (0.76 mi^{2}). The number of villages decreased to 21 in 2023 upon implementation of the local governance reforms.

== Regional municipalities ==
The Lieutenant-Governor in Council may incorporate an area as a regional municipality under the Local Governance Act if there is a population of at least 15,000 and at least one existing municipality. New Brunswick's first and only regional municipality was incorporated on May 12, 2014. The Regional Municipality of Tracadie was formed through the amalgamation of the former Town of Tracadie–Sheila, eighteen local service districts and portions of two other local service districts. Regional municipalities must have a population greater than 15,000 and a community grouping that includes at least one municipality. Regional municipalities elect a local council but are responsible only for community administration, planning and emergency measures services, and all services previously provided by any former municipality that is now part of the regional municipality. The Province of New Brunswick is responsible for police protection and road services, unless the regional municipality chooses to assume these responsibilities.

== Rural communities ==
Prior to implementation of the 2023 local governance reforms, New Brunswick had eight rural communities that had a cumulative population of 24,842 in the 2021 Census. New Brunswick's largest and smallest rural communities were Beaubassin East and Campobello Island with populations of 6,718 and 949 respectively. The number of rural communities increased to seventeen in 2023 upon implementation of the local governance reforms.

Rural communities elect local councils and are responsible for the delivery of some local services, including administrative services, community planning and emergency measures. The province of New Brunswick ensures the delivery of other services including solid waste collection and recreation services unless the rural community chooses to take on these responsibilities. Rural communities that include a former village or town are an exception, as they are responsible to provide all services that were previously provided by their former municipality.

== Lists of municipalities ==
=== Post-2023 local governance reform ===
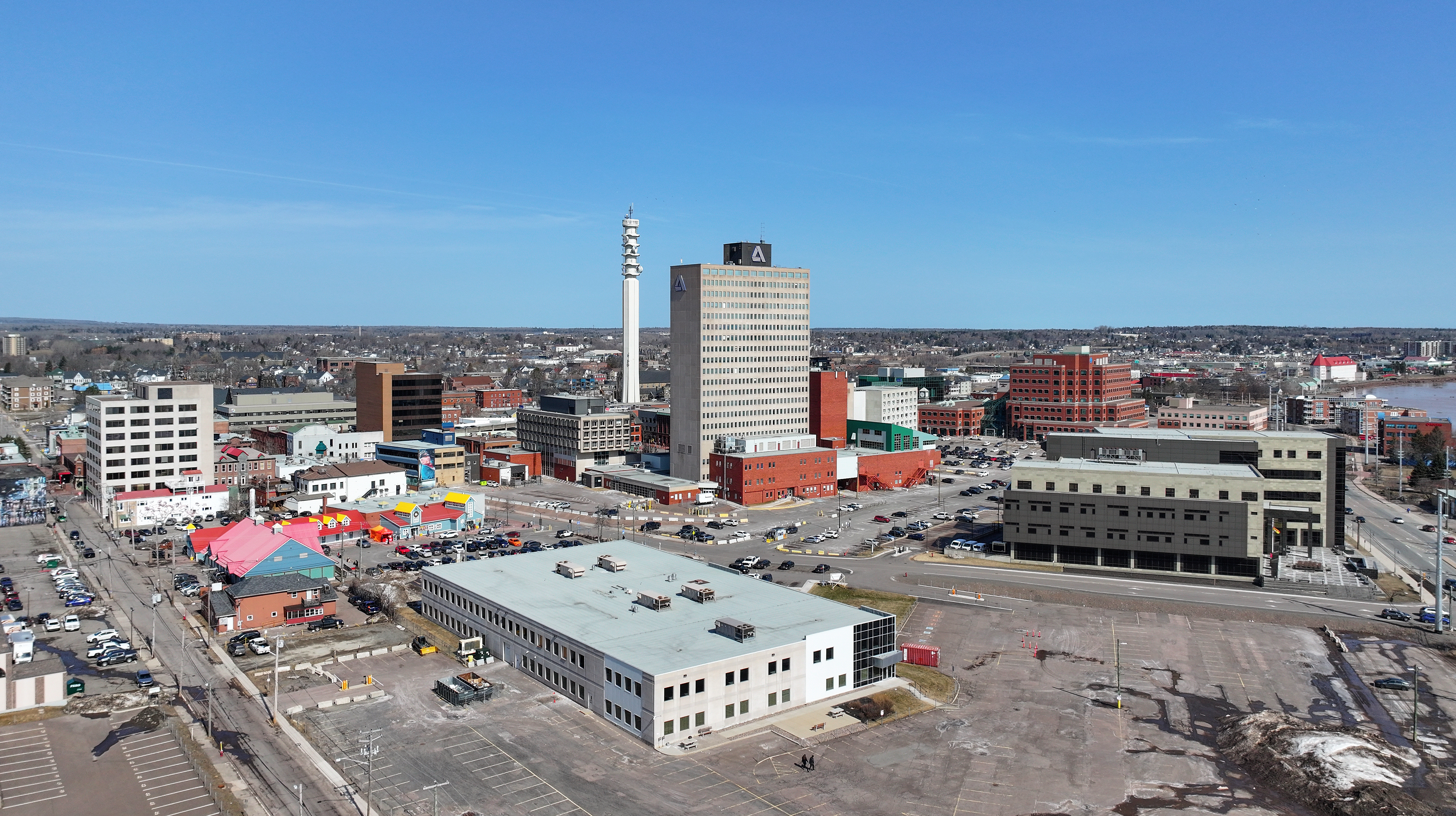
Skyline of Moncton, New Brunswick's largest municipality

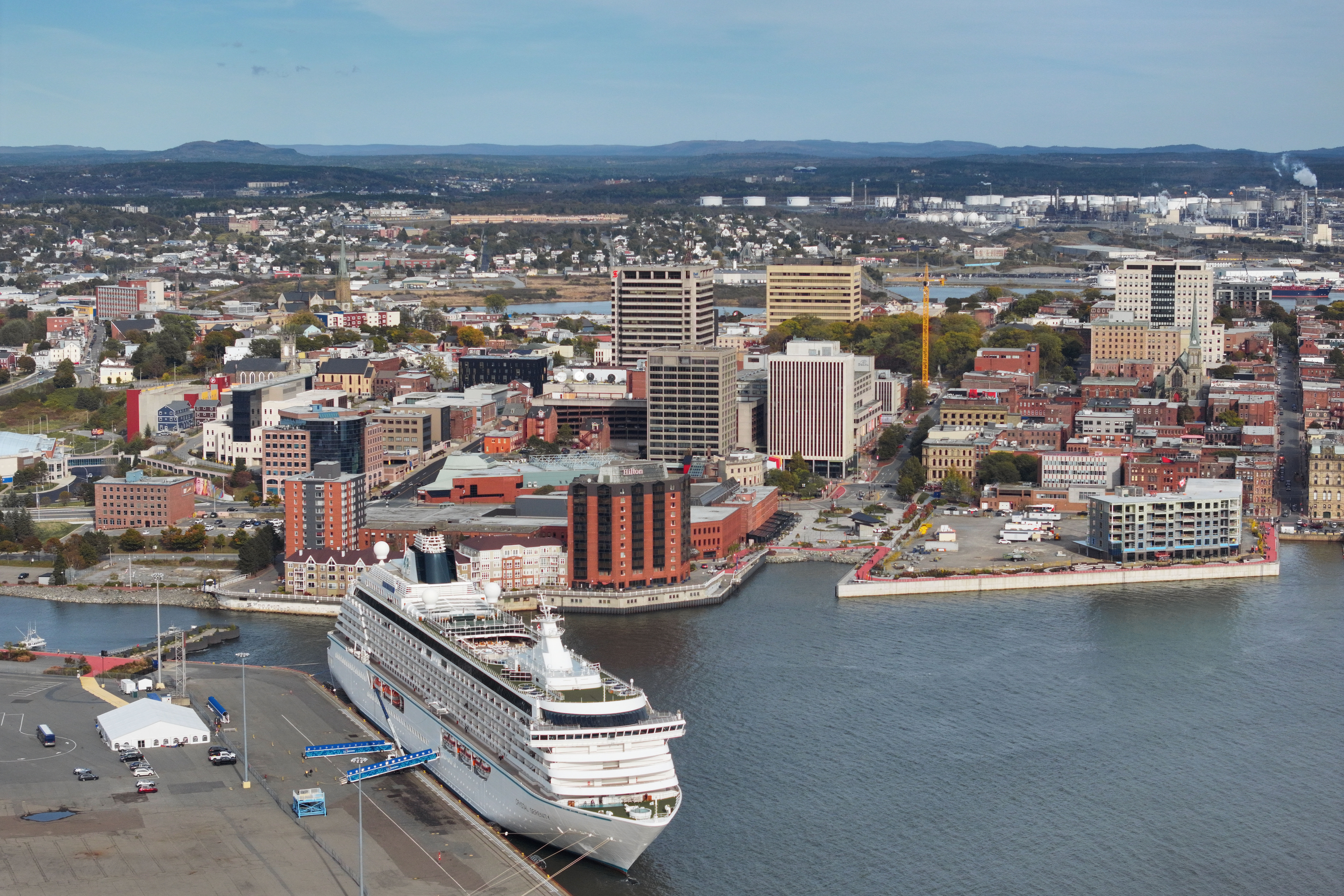
Skyline of Saint John, New Brunswick's second largest municipality

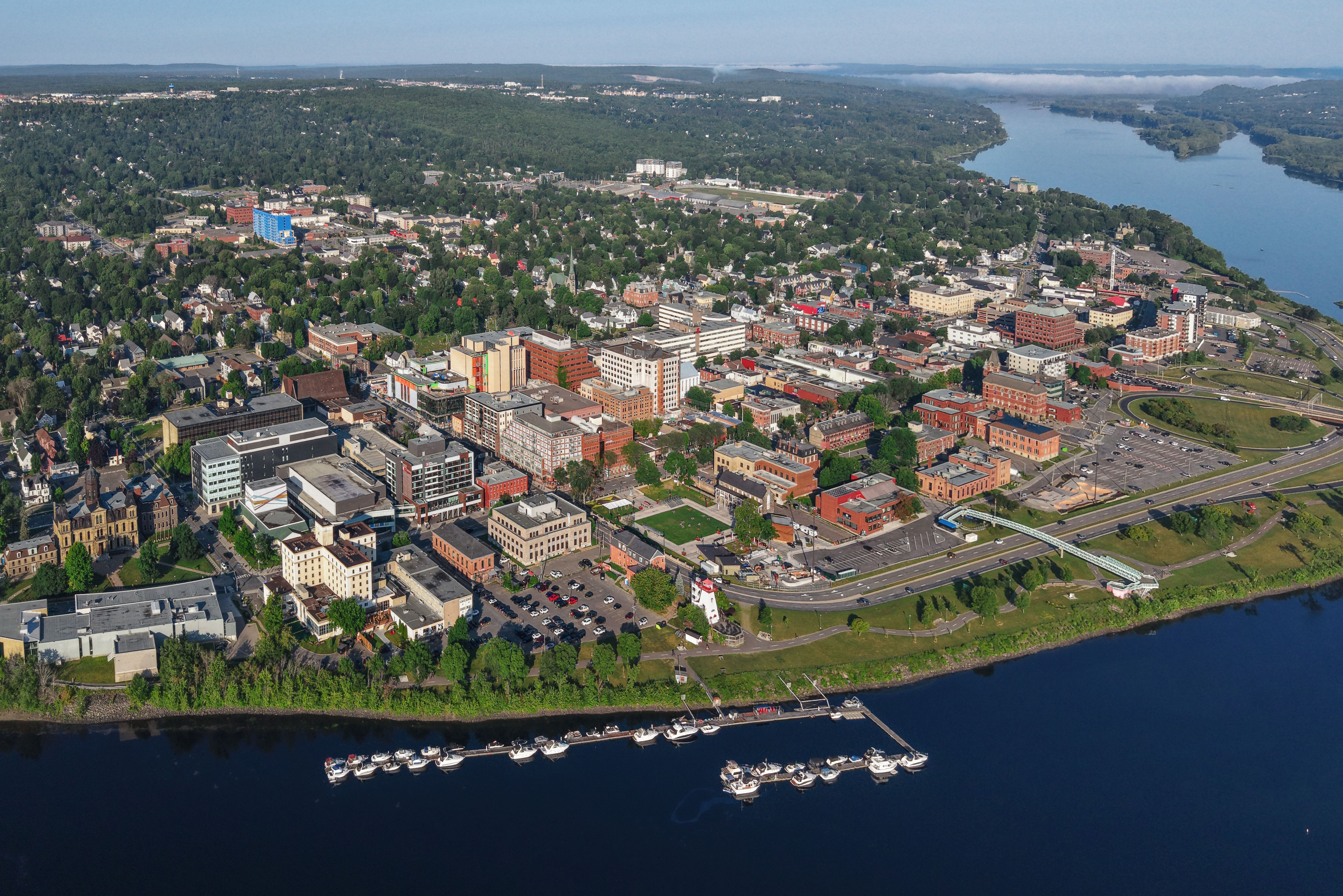
Skyline of Fredericton, New Brunswick's capital city and third-largest municipality

List of municipalities in New Brunswick
Name	Municipal type	Regional service commission	Incorporation	2021 population
Alnwick	Rural community	Greater Miramichi	2023	3,575
Arcadia	Village	Capital Region	2023	3,720
Bathurst (Note: The 2023 local governance reform only involved the annexation of adjacent unincorporated lands to Bathurst.)	City	Chaleur	1912	15,110
Beaurivage	Town	Kent	2023	6,160
Beausoleil (Note: The 2023 local governance reform only involved the annexation of adjacent unincorporated lands to Cocagne and its renaming to Beausoleil.)	Rural community	Kent	2023	8,620
Belle-Baie	Town	Chaleur	2023	14,335
Belledune (Note: The 2023 local governance reform did not affect Belledune.)	Village	Chaleur	1968	1,325
Bois-Joli	Village	Restigouche	2023	3,750
Butternut Valley	Rural community	Kings	2023	5,435
Campbellton	City	Restigouche	1888	12,000
Campobello Island (Note: The 2023 local governance reform did not affect Campobello Island.)	Rural community	Southwest	2010	950
Cap-Acadie	Town	Southeast	2023	9,165
Caraquet	Town	Acadian Peninsula	1961	8,125
Carleton North	Town	Western Valley	2023	9,170
Central York	Rural community	Capital Region	2023	6,930
Champdoré	Town	Kent	2023	5,115
Dieppe (Note: The 2023 local governance reform only involved the annexation of adjacent unincorporated lands to Dieppe.)	City	Southeast	1952	28,970
Doaktown (Note: The 2023 local governance reform only involved the annexation of adjacent unincorporated lands to Doaktown.)	Village	Greater Miramichi	1966	1,250
Eastern Charlotte	Rural community	Southwest	2023	7,325
Edmundston	City	Northwest	1952	18,365
Five Rivers (Note: The 2023 local governance reform only involved the annexation of adjacent unincorporated lands to Rexton and its renaming to Five Rivers.)	Village	Kent	2023	3,385
Fredericton (Note: The 2023 local governance reform only involved the annexation of adjacent unincorporated lands to Fredericton.)	City	Capital Region	1848	67,625
Fredericton Junction (Note: The 2023 local governance reform did not affect Fredericton Junction.)	Village	Capital Region	1966	715
Fundy Albert	Village	Southeast	2023	6,120
Fundy Shores	Rural community	Southwest	2023	2,050
Fundy-St. Martins (Note: The 2023 local governance reform only involved the annexation of adjacent unincorporated lands to St. Martins and its renaming to Fundy-St. Martins.)	Village	Fundy	2023	5,225
Grand Bay-Westfield (Note: The 2023 local governance reform only involved the annexation of adjacent unincorporated lands to Grand Bay-Westfield.)	Town	Fundy	1998	5,880
Grand-Bouctouche (Note: The 2023 local governance reform only involved the annexation of adjacent unincorporated lands to Bouctouche and its renaming to Grand-Bouctouche.)	Town	Kent	1966	5,650
Grand Falls	Town	Northwest	1890	10,900
Grand Lake	Village	Capital Region	2023	5,725
Grand Manan (Note: The 2023 local governance reform did not affect Grand Manan.)	Village	Southwest	1995	2,595
Hampton (Note: The 2023 local governance reform only involved the annexation of adjacent unincorporated lands to Hampton.)	Town	Fundy	1966	9,345
Hanwell (Note: The 2023 local governance reform only involved the annexation of adjacent unincorporated lands to Hanwell.)	Rural community	Capital Region	2014	7,100
Hartland (Note: The 2023 local governance reform only involved the annexation of adjacent unincorporated lands to Hartland.)	Town	Western Valley	1918	3,745
Harvey	Rural community	Capital Region	1966	3,895
Haut-Madawaska	Town	Northwest	2017	4,405
Hautes-Terres	Town	Acadian Peninsula	2023	6,140
Heron Bay	Town	Restigouche	2023	5,485
Île-de-Lamèque	Town	Acadian Peninsula	2023	5,620
Kedgwick (Note: The 2023 local governance reform only involved the annexation of adjacent unincorporated lands to Kedgwick.)	Rural community	Restigouche	2012	2,300
Lakeland Ridges	Village	Western Valley	2023	2,450
Maple Hills	Rural community	Southeast	2023	8,390
McAdam (Note: The 2023 local governance reform did not affect McAdam.)	Village	Southwest	1966	1,175
Memramcook (Note: The 2023 local governance reform did not affect Memramcook.)	Village	Southeast	1995	5,030
Miramichi (Note: The 2023 local governance reform only involved the annexation of adjacent unincorporated lands to Miramichi.)	City	Greater Miramichi	1995	18,125
Miramichi River Valley	Rural community	Greater Miramichi	2023	7,210
Moncton (Note: The 2023 local governance reform only involved the annexation of adjacent unincorporated lands to Moncton.)	City	Southeast	1890	80,080
Nackawic-Millville	Rural community	Capital Region	2023	3,765
Nashwaak	Rural community	Capital Region	2023	4,755
Neguac (Note: The 2023 local governance reform did not affect Neguac.)	Village	Acadian Peninsula	1967	1,675
New Maryland (Note: The 2023 local governance reform did not affect New Maryland.)	Village	Capital Region	1991	4,155
Nouvelle-Arcadie (Note: The 2023 local governance reform only involved the annexation of adjacent unincorporated lands to Rogersville and its renaming to Nouvelle-Arcadie.)	Village	Kent	2023	3,060
Oromocto (Note: The 2023 local governance reform only involved the annexation of adjacent unincorporated lands to Oromocto.)	Town	Capital Region	1956	11,910
Quispamsis (Note: The 2023 local governance reform did not affect Quispamsis.)	Town	Fundy	1966	18,780
Riverview (Note: The 2023 local governance reform only involved the annexation of adjacent unincorporated lands to Riverview.)	Town	Southeast	1973	20,580
Rivière-du-Nord	Town	Acadian Peninsula	2023	3,530
Rothesay (Note: The 2023 local governance reform did not affect Rothesay.)	Town	Fundy	1988	11,975
Saint Andrews (Note: The 2023 local governance reform only involved the annexation of adjacent unincorporated lands to Saint Andrews.)	Town	Southwest	1903	2,950
Saint John (Note: The 2023 local governance reform did not affect Saint John.)	City	Fundy	1785	69,875
Saint-Quentin (Note: The 2023 local governance reform only involved the annexation of adjacent unincorporated lands to Saint-Quentin.)	Town	Northwest	1947	3,630
Salisbury	Town	Southeast	1966	7,745
Shediac (Note: The 2023 local governance reform only involved the annexation of adjacent unincorporated lands to Shediac.)	Town	Southeast	1903	10,670
Shippagan	Town	Acadian Peninsula	1947	4,925
Southern Victoria	Village	Western Valley	2023	2,550
St. Stephen (Note: The 2023 local governance reform only involved the annexation of adjacent unincorporated lands to St. Stephen and the change of its official legal name from Town of St. Stephen to Municipal District of St. Stephen.)	Town	Southwest	1973	8,165
Strait Shores	Rural community	Southeast	2023	1,935
Sunbury-York South	Rural community	Capital Region	2023	7,455
Sussex	Town	Kings	1904	6,030
Tantramar	Town	Southeast	2023	9,020
Three Rivers (Note: The 2023 local governance reform only involved the annexation of adjacent unincorporated lands to Petitcodiac and its renaming to Three Rivers.)	Village	Southeast	2023	3,990
Tobique Valley (Note: The 2023 local governance reform only involved the annexation of adjacent unincorporated lands to Plaster Rock and its renaming to Tobique Valley.)	Village	Western Valley	2023	2,740
Tracadie (Note: The 2023 local governance reform did not affect Tracadie.)	Regional municipality	Acadian Peninsula	2014	16,095
Tracy (Note: The 2023 local governance reform did not affect Tracy.)	Village	Capital Region	1966	605
Upper Miramichi (Note: The 2023 local governance reform did not affect Upper Miramichi.)	Rural community	Greater Miramichi	2008	2,180
Vallée-des-Rivières	Town	Northwest	2023	4,250
Valley Waters (Note: The 2023 local governance reform only involved the annexation of adjacent unincorporated lands to Norton and its renaming to Valley Waters.)	Village	Kings	2023	4,545
Woodstock (Note: The 2023 local governance reform only involved the annexation of adjacent unincorporated lands to Woodstock.)	Town	Western Valley	1856	11,915

=== Pre-2023 local governance reform ===
List of municipalities in New Brunswick
Name	Municipal type	County	Incorporation date	2021 Census of Population				
Name	Municipal type	County	Incorporation date	Population (2021)	Population (2016)	Change	Land area (km^{2})	Population density (/km^{2})
Bathurst	City	Gloucester	1912	12,157	11,897	+2.2%	91.62	132.7
Campbellton	City	Restigouche	1888	7,047	6,883	+2.4%	18.57	379.5
Dieppe	City	Westmorland	1952	28,114	25,384	+10.8%	77.02	365.0
Edmundston	City	Madawaska	1952	16,437	16,580	−0.9%	106.84	153.8
Fredericton	City	York	1848	63,116	58,721	+7.5%	133.93	471.3
Miramichi	City	Northumberland	1995	17,692	17,537	+0.9%	178.98	98.8
Moncton	City	Westmorland	1890	79,470	71,889	+10.5%	140.67	564.9
Saint John	City	Saint John	1785	69,895	67,575	+3.4%	315.59	221.5
Tracadie	Regional municipality	Gloucester	2014	16,043	16,114	−0.4%	516.55	31.1
Beaubassin East	Rural community	Westmorland	1995	6,718	6,376	+5.4%	291.02	23.1
Campobello Island	Rural community	Charlotte	2010	949	872	+8.8%	39.59	24.0
Cocagne	Rural community	Kent	2014	2,757	2,649	+4.1%	69.23	39.8
Hanwell	Rural community	York	2014	4,743	4,700	+0.9%	152.06	31.2
Haut-Madawaska	Rural community	Madawaska	2017	3,720	3,714	+0.2%	611.55	6.1
Kedgwick	Rural community	Restigouche	2012	1,986	1,964	+1.1%	649.36	3.1
Saint-André	Rural community	Madawaska	2006	1,794	1,901	−5.6%	136.19	13.2
Upper Miramichi	Rural community	Northumberland	2008	2,175	2,218	−1.9%	1,832.97	1.2
Beresford	Town	Gloucester	1967	4,294	4,288	+0.1%	19.24	223.2
Bouctouche	Town	Kent	1966	2,513	2,361	+6.4%	18.33	137.1
Caraquet	Town	Gloucester	1961	4,285	4,248	+0.9%	68.13	62.9
Dalhousie	Town	Restigouche	1905	3,223	3,126	+3.1%	15.12	213.2
Florenceville-Bristol	Town	Carleton	2008	1,573	1,604	−1.9%	15.74	99.9
Grand Bay-Westfield	Town	Kings	1998	4,967	4,964	+0.1%	59.82	83.0
Grand Falls	Town	Victoria	1890	5,220	5,326	−2.0%	18.04	289.4
Hampton	Town	Kings	1966	4,395	4,289	+2.5%	20.97	209.6
Hartland	Town	Carleton	1918	933	957	−2.5%	9.50	98.2
Lamèque	Town	Gloucester	1966	1,301	1,285	+1.2%	12.40	104.9
Nackawic	Town	York	1976	962	941	+2.2%	7.68	125.3
Oromocto	Town	Sunbury	1956	9,045	9,223	−1.9%	22.36	404.5
Quispamsis	Town	Kings	1966	18,768	18,245	+2.9%	56.97	329.4
Richibucto	Town	Kent	1966	1,411	1,266	+11.5%	11.90	118.6
Riverview	Town	Albert	1973	20,584	19,667	+4.7%	34.10	603.6
Rothesay	Town	Kings	1988	11,977	11,659	+2.7%	34.59	346.3
Sackville	Town	Westmorland	1903	6,099	5,331	+14.4%	73.91	82.5
Saint Andrews	Town	Charlotte	1903	2,048	1,786	+14.7%	8.35	245.3
Saint-Léonard	Town	Madawaska	1920	1,322	1,300	+1.7%	5.34	247.6
Saint-Quentin	Town	Restigouche	1947	2,141	2,194	−2.4%	4.24	505.0
Shediac	Town	Westmorland	1903	7,535	6,664	+13.1%	64.00	117.7
Shippagan	Town	Gloucester	1947	2,672	2,580	+3.6%	9.96	268.3
St. George	Town	Charlotte	1904	1,579	1,517	+4.1%	16.17	97.6
St. Stephen	Town	Charlotte	1973 (Note: St. Stephen was incorporated as a town in 1871 and amalgamated with Milltown in 1973 to form St. Stephen-Milltown; the name reverted to St. Stephen in 1975.)	4,510	4,415	+2.2%	13.72	328.7
Sussex	Town	Kings	1904	4,440	4,282	+3.7%	8.90	498.9
Woodstock	Town	Carleton	1856	5,553	5,228	+6.2%	14.96	371.2
Alma	Village	Albert	1966	282	213	+32.4%	47.64	5.9
Aroostook	Village	Victoria	1966	313	306	+2.3%	2.23	140.4
Atholville	Village	Restigouche	1966	3,290	3,570	−7.8%	119.58	27.5
Balmoral	Village	Restigouche	1972	1,603	1,674	−4.2%	43.33	37.0
Bas-Caraquet	Village	Gloucester	1966	1,311	1,305	+0.5%	30.93	42.4
Bath	Village	Carleton	1966	440	476	−7.6%	2.00	220.0
Belledune	Village	Restigouche	1968	1,325	1,417	−6.5%	189.18	7.0
Bertrand	Village	Gloucester	1968	1,153	1,166	−1.1%	57.01	20.2
Blacks Harbour	Village	Charlotte	1972	907	894	+1.5%	9.02	100.6
Blackville	Village	Northumberland	1966	914	958	−4.6%	20.97	43.6
Cambridge-Narrows	Village	Queens	1966	715	562	+27.2%	106.79	6.7
Canterbury	Village	York	1966	320	336	−4.8%	5.32	60.2
Cap-Pelé	Village	Westmorland	1969	2,503	2,425	+3.2%	22.96	109.0
Centreville	Village	Carleton	1966	508	557	−8.8%	2.67	190.3
Charlo	Village	Restigouche	1966	1,323	1,310	+1.0%	31.45	42.1
Chipman	Village	Queens	1966	1,201	1,104	+8.8%	19.00	63.2
Doaktown	Village	Northumberland	1966	808	792	+2.0%	29.09	27.8
Dorchester	Village	Westmorland	1966	906	1,096	−17.3%	5.71	158.7
Drummond	Village	Victoria	1967	729	737	−1.1%	8.88	82.1
Eel River Crossing	Village	Restigouche	1966	1,844	1,953	−5.6%	65.26	28.3
Fredericton Junction	Village	Sunbury	1966	719	704	+2.1%	23.85	30.1
Gagetown	Village	Queens	1966	787	711	+10.7%	49.32	16.0
Grand Manan	Village	Charlotte	1995	2,595	2,360	+10.0%	150.56	17.2
Grande-Anse	Village	Gloucester	1968	731	899	−18.7%	24.27	30.1
Harvey	Village	York	1966	402	358	+12.3%	2.46	163.4
Hillsborough	Village	Albert	1966	1,348	1,277	+5.6%	12.81	105.2
Lac Baker	Village	Madawaska	1967	685	690	−0.7%	37.24	18.4
Le Goulet	Village	Gloucester	1986	749	793	−5.5%	5.40	138.7
Maisonnette	Village	Gloucester	1986	535	495	+8.1%	12.91	41.4
McAdam	Village	York	1966	1,173	1,151	+1.9%	14.19	82.7
Meductic	Village	York	1966	180	215	−16.3%	6.26	28.8
Memramcook	Village	Westmorland	1995	5,029	4,778	+5.3%	186.64	26.9
Millville	Village	York	1966	274	273	+0.4%	12.14	22.6
Minto	Village	Queens	1966	2,234	2,305	−3.1%	31.36	71.2
Neguac	Village	Northumberland	1967	1,692	1,684	+0.5%	26.72	63.3
New Maryland	Village	York	1991	4,153	4,174	−0.5%	21.25	195.4
Nigadoo	Village	Gloucester	1967	997	963	+3.5%	7.65	130.3
Norton	Village	Kings	1966	1,410	1,382	+2.0%	75.35	18.7
Paquetville	Village	Gloucester	1966	718	720	−0.3%	9.26	77.5
Perth-Andover	Village	Victoria	1966	1,574	1,590	−1.0%	8.96	175.7
Petitcodiac	Village	Westmorland	1966	1,476	1,383	+6.7%	17.18	85.9
Petit-Rocher	Village	Gloucester	1966	1,954	1,897	+3.0%	4.52	432.3
Plaster Rock	Village	Victoria	1966	1,002	1,023	−2.1%	3.01	332.9
Pointe-Verte	Village	Gloucester	1966	865	886	−2.4%	13.76	62.9
Port Elgin	Village	Westmorland	1922	381	408	−6.6%	2.65	143.8
Rexton	Village	Kent	1966	874	830	+5.3%	6.29	139.0
Riverside-Albert	Village	Albert	1966	348	350	−0.6%	3.39	102.7
Rivière-Verte	Village	Madawaska	1966	744	724	+2.8%	6.91	107.7
Rogersville	Village	Northumberland	1966	1,193	1,166	+2.3%	7.19	165.9
Saint-Antoine	Village	Kent	1966 (Note: Incorporated as St. Anthony but the name was changed to Saint-Antoine in 1969.)	1,791	1,733	+3.3%	6.32	283.4
Sainte-Anne-de-Madawaska	Village	Madawaska	1966	891	957	−6.9%	8.97	99.3
Sainte-Marie-Saint-Raphaël	Village	Gloucester	1966	820	879	−6.7%	15.84	51.8
Saint-Isidore	Village	Gloucester	1978	810	764	+6.0%	22.94	35.3
Saint-Léolin	Village	Gloucester	1966	615	647	−4.9%	19.73	31.2
Saint-Louis de Kent	Village	Kent	1986	981	856	+14.6%	1.98	495.5
Salisbury	Village	Westmorland	1966	2,387	2,284	+4.5%	13.56	176.0
St. Martins	Village	Saint John	1966	320	276	+15.9%	2.35	136.2
Stanley	Village	York	1966	397	412	−3.6%	16.93	23.4
Sussex Corner	Village	Kings	1966	1,458	1,461	−0.2%	9.32	156.4
Tide Head	Village	Restigouche	1966	951	938	+1.4%	19.34	49.2
Tracy	Village	Sunbury	1966	610	608	+0.3%	29.44	20.7
Sub-total cities				293,928	276,466	+6.3%	1,063.22	276.5
Sub-total regional municipalities				16,043	16,114	−0.4%	516.55	31.1
Sub-total rural communities				24,842	24,394	+1.8%	3,781.97	6.6
Sub-total towns				133,350	128,746	+3.6%	644.44	206.9
Sub-total villages				71,248	70,855	+0.6%	1,769.24	40.3
Total municipalities				539,411	516,575	+4.4%	7,775.42	69.4
Province of New Brunswick				775,610	747,101	+3.8%	71,248.50	10.9

== See also ==
- 2023 New Brunswick local governance reform
- Demographics of New Brunswick
- Geography of New Brunswick
- List of census agglomerations in Atlantic Canada
- List of communities in New Brunswick
- List of designated places in New Brunswick
- List of local service districts in New Brunswick
- List of municipal amalgamations in New Brunswick
- List of parishes in New Brunswick
- List of population centres in New Brunswick
- New Brunswick municipal elections, 2016
