= Carleton North =

Carleton North may refer to:

- Carleton North, New Brunswick, a town in Canada
- Carleton North (electoral district), a former electoral district in New Brunswick
- North Carleton, an area in Prince Edward Island, Canada

== See also ==
- Carlton North, a suburb of Melbourne, Australia
- North Carlton (disambiguation)
