= 2023 New Brunswick local governance reform =

Local governance reform in New Brunswick

An Act Respecting Local Governance Reform Loi concernant la réforme de la gouvernance locale
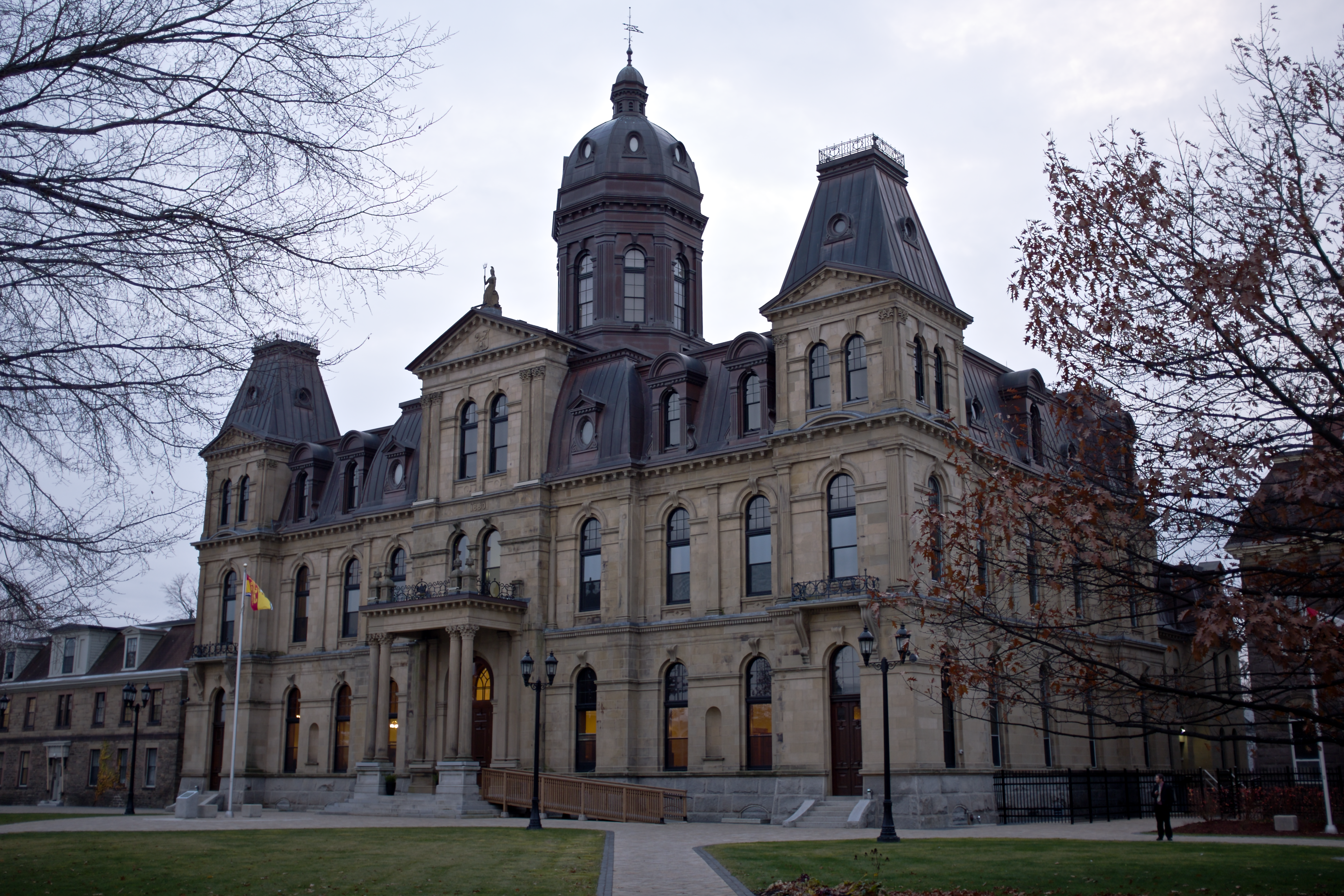

Legislative Assembly of New Brunswick
- Enacted by: 1st Session, 60th Legislature
- Assented to: December 17, 2021

Legislative history
- Bill title: Bill 82

Related legislation
- Local Governments Establishment Regulation
- Status: Current legislation

Local governance reform in the Canadian province of New Brunswick was implemented on January 1, 2023. This resulted in a significant reorganization of the local government entities in the province, including a reduction in the number of entities from 340 to 89, consisting of 77 local governments and 12 rural districts nested within 12 regional service commissions. The local governance reform review was commenced by the Government of New Brunswick in January 2021 and was promoted as the most consequential restructuring of the local governance system since Premier Robichaud's Equal Opportunity Program.

== Background ==
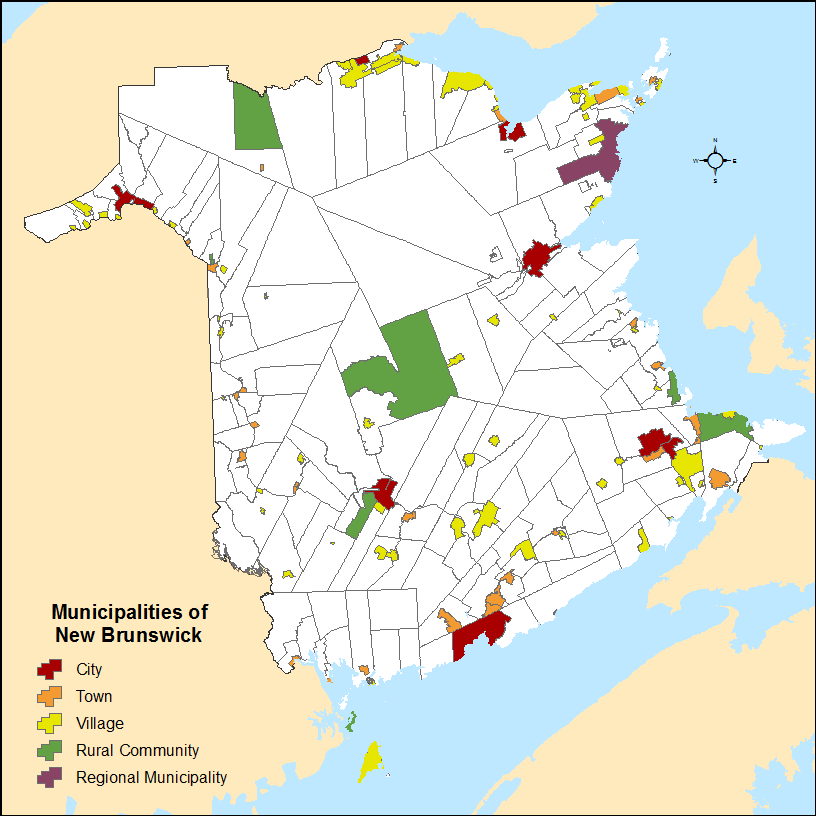
Distribution of New Brunswick's local governments by municipal status type before reform. Subdivisions in white are parishes.

Immediately prior to the 2023 reform, New Brunswick's local governance system consisted of 12 regional service commissions and 340 local entities including 104 local governments (i.e., municipalities) and 236 local service districts. Following the appointment of Daniel Allain as Minister of Local Government and Local Governance Reform, the Government of New Brunswick commenced the reform of the system on January 19, 2021; its first significant local governance reform in 60 years. The intent of the reform was to modernize the local governance system due to a lack of elected local government representation for more than 30 per cent of the province's population, redundancies in the delivery of services and infrastructure, and to address challenges for communities in the delivery of services. The reform was announced to be multiphase in nature and featured stakeholder engagement.

Public engagement commenced in April 2021 with the release of a local governance reform green paper. The paper outlines four topics to guide engagement including the current local governance structure, regional collaboration, land use planning, and finance. An advisory committee was established to steer the reform process with working groups created for each of the four engagement topics. Public engagement sessions were scheduled for mid-May 2021 with a deadline of May 31 for the public to submit its input. An engagement report was published in September 2021, summarizing feedback received from stakeholders and the public. A round of meetings to discuss the engagement summary report ensued.

Distribution of New Brunswick's new local governance entities by municipal status type after reform

The Government of New Brunswick announced its initial plan to reform the province's local governance system in a white paper published in November 2021. A reduction in the current system of 340 entities to 90 entities – 78 local governments and 12 rural districts – was proposed. For the 12 rural districts, a structure was proposed featuring advisory committees with members elected in November 2022. It was announced that the restructuring transition process would be financed by the provincial government.

Revisions to the initial plan were announced in December 2021 based on feedback arising from review of the initial plan. Revisions included the geographic reconfiguration of numerous proposed entities that resulted in a net reduction of the proposed local governments from 78 to 77. One proposed local government was merged into another, one proposed local government was deleted with its geography distributed into two others, and one proposed local government was split into two. While most revisions were well-received, the movement of the Chiasson-Savoy local service district from Shippagan to Île-de-Lamèque in a court case that was not resolved until October 2022.

The proposed names of the 77 local governments and 12 rural districts were announced on May 25, 2022; The names were officially set on August 30, 2022, and took effect on January 1, 2023; the boundary descriptions used in previous consolidated regulations have been replaced entirely by maps.

Unlike changes to boundaries, the financial component of the local governance reform was implemented piecemeal. Phase one of the white paper's financial reform plan included property taxation adjustments and changes to the community funding and equalization grant. Among the most notable changes for local governments was the ability to increase the tax rate on non-residential properties up to 1.7 times the local rate. Plans for phase two are still underway, though the provincial government has already committed to reduced its own tax rate on nonresidential properties over three years. In addition to changes proposed in the white paper, new possibilities like decoupling apartments from the rest of the non-owner occupied residential tax class are also being considered.

Changes to the community funding and equalization grant occurred in the fall. In May 2022, an independent expert panel was also commissioned to study the community funding and equalization grant system in New Brunswick and make recommendations on how to improve it to the government. The resulting report on Provincial Municipal Fiscal Arrangements in New Brunswick was released on September 28, 2022. Ultimately, the government chose to implement some components of the expert panel's report but did not implement their new equalization formula. On October 4, 2022, Minister Allain introduced amendments in the legislature outlining the government's new funding mechanism. The changes imposed a fixed annual rate for community funding of just under $76 million until 2028, redirected core funding to support the priorities of the regional service commissions, and introduced an updated equalization formula. Under the new formula, payments will be adjusted for annual tax base growth compared to the provincial tax base growth to a maximum of three per cent. Any reduced need for equalization funding will be redirected, along with the core funding revenue, to help support the expanded mandates of regional service commissions.

== List of local governments ==
The local governance reform resulted in 77 local governments. The initial white paper proposals were revised after a period of consultation and some changes made. The regulation that made the names and boundaries official was filed on August 30, 2022, with the various changes taking effect on January 1, 2023.

| Name | Entity No. | Status | Regional service commission | Previous local governments/local service districts |
|---|---|---|---|---|
| Haut-Madawaska | 1 | Town | Northwest | Rural Community of Haut-Madawaska |
| Haut-Madawaska | 1 | Town | Northwest | Village of Lac Baker |
| Edmundston | 2 | City | Northwest | City of Edmundston |
| Edmundston | 2 | City | Northwest | Village of Rivière-Verte |
| Edmundston | 2 | City | Northwest | LSD of Saint-Jacques (part) |
| Edmundston | 2 | City | Northwest | LSD of Saint-Joseph (part) |
| Vallée-des-Rivières | 3 | Town | Northwest | Town of Saint-Léonard |
| Vallée-des-Rivières | 3 | Town | Northwest | Village of Sainte-Anne-de-Madawaska |
| Vallée-des-Rivières | 3 | Town | Northwest | LSD of Sainte-Anne (part) |
| Vallée-des-Rivières | 3 | Town | Northwest | LSD of Notre-Dame-de-Lourdes (part) |
| Vallée-des-Rivières | 3 | Town | Northwest | LSD of Saint-Léonard (part) |
| Vallée-des-Rivières | 3 | Town | Northwest | LSD of Rivière-Verte (part) |
| Grand Falls (French: Grand-Sault) | 4 | Town | Northwest | Town of Grand Falls |
| Grand Falls (French: Grand-Sault) | 4 | Town | Northwest | Village of Drummond |
| Grand Falls (French: Grand-Sault) | 4 | Town | Northwest | Rural Community of Saint-André |
| Grand Falls (French: Grand-Sault) | 4 | Town | Northwest | LSD of Drummond (part) |
| Grand Falls (French: Grand-Sault) | 4 | Town | Northwest | LSD of Grand Falls |
| Saint-Quentin | 5 | Town | Northwest | Town of Saint-Quentin |
| Saint-Quentin | 5 | Town | Northwest | LSD of Saint-Quentin (part) |
| Saint-Quentin | 5 | Town | Northwest | LSD of St. Martin de Restigouche |
| Kedgwick | 6 | Rural community | Northwest | Rural Community of Kedgwick |
| Kedgwick | 6 | Rural community | Northwest | LSD of Eldon (part) |
| Kedgwick | 6 | Rural community | Northwest | LSD of St. Jean Baptiste – Menneval |
| Kedgwick | 6 | Rural community | Northwest | LSD of White's Brook |
| Kedgwick | 6 | Rural community | Northwest | LSD of Saint-Quentin (part) |
| Campbellton | 7 | City | Restigouche | City of Campbellton |
| Campbellton | 7 | City | Restigouche | Village of Atholville |
| Campbellton | 7 | City | Restigouche | Village of Tide Head |
| Campbellton | 7 | City | Restigouche | LSD of Glencoe |
| Campbellton | 7 | City | Restigouche | LSD of Dalhousie (part) |
| Campbellton | 7 | City | Restigouche | LSD of McLeods (part) |
| Campbellton | 7 | City | Restigouche | LSD of Balmoral (part) (Note: Listed in the white paper as Balmoral-Maltais, the name used by the corresponding Taxing Authority) |
| Campbellton | 7 | City | Restigouche | LSD of Addington (part) |
| Bois-Joli | 8 | Village | Restigouche | Village of Eel River Crossing |
| Bois-Joli | 8 | Village | Restigouche | Village of Balmoral |
| Bois-Joli | 8 | Village | Restigouche | LSD of Balmoral (part) |
| Bois-Joli | 8 | Village | Restigouche | LSD of Blair Athol |
| Bois-Joli | 8 | Village | Restigouche | LSD of Balmoral-St. Maure |
| Bois-Joli | 8 | Village | Restigouche | LSD of Dalhousie (part) |
| Bois-Joli | 8 | Village | Restigouche | LSD of McLeods (part) |
| Heron Bay (French: Baie-des-Hérons) | 9 | Town | Restigouche | Town of Dalhousie |
| Heron Bay (French: Baie-des-Hérons) | 9 | Town | Restigouche | Village of Charlo |
| Heron Bay (French: Baie-des-Hérons) | 9 | Town | Restigouche | LSD of Point La Nim |
| Heron Bay (French: Baie-des-Hérons) | 9 | Town | Restigouche | LSD of Dalhousie Junction |
| Heron Bay (French: Baie-des-Hérons) | 9 | Town | Restigouche | LSD of Dalhousie (part) |
| Heron Bay (French: Baie-des-Hérons) | 9 | Town | Restigouche | LSD of Chaleur (part) |
| Heron Bay (French: Baie-des-Hérons) | 9 | Town | Restigouche | LSD of Balmoral (part) |
| Belledune | 10 | Village | Chaleur | Village of Belledune |
| Belle-Baie | 11 | Town | Chaleur | Town of Beresford |
| Belle-Baie | 11 | Town | Chaleur | Village of Nigadoo |
| Belle-Baie | 11 | Town | Chaleur | Village of Petit-Rocher |
| Belle-Baie | 11 | Town | Chaleur | Village of Pointe-Verte |
| Belle-Baie | 11 | Town | Chaleur | LSD of Madran |
| Belle-Baie | 11 | Town | Chaleur | LSD of Petit-Rocher-Nord (Devereaux) |
| Belle-Baie | 11 | Town | Chaleur | LSD of Petit-Rocher-Sud |
| Belle-Baie | 11 | Town | Chaleur | LSD of Tremblay |
| Belle-Baie | 11 | Town | Chaleur | LSD of Dunlop |
| Belle-Baie | 11 | Town | Chaleur | LSD of Robertville |
| Belle-Baie | 11 | Town | Chaleur | LSD of Laplante |
| Belle-Baie | 11 | Town | Chaleur | LSD of Beresford (part) |
| Belle-Baie | 11 | Town | Chaleur | LSD of North Tetagouche (part) |
| Belle-Baie | 11 | Town | Chaleur | LSD of Bathurst (part) |
| Bathurst | 12 | City | Chaleur | City of Bathurst |
| Bathurst | 12 | City | Chaleur | LSD of North Tetagouche (part) |
| Bathurst | 12 | City | Chaleur | LSD of Big River (part) |
| Bathurst | 12 | City | Chaleur | LSD of Bathurst (part) |
| Rivière-du-Nord | 13 | Town | Acadian Peninsula | Village of Bertrand |
| Rivière-du-Nord | 13 | Town | Acadian Peninsula | Village of Maisonnette |
| Rivière-du-Nord | 13 | Town | Acadian Peninsula | Village of Grande-Anse |
| Rivière-du-Nord | 13 | Town | Acadian Peninsula | Village of Saint-Léolin |
| Rivière-du-Nord | 13 | Town | Acadian Peninsula | LSD of Poirier |
| Rivière-du-Nord | 13 | Town | Acadian Peninsula | LSD of Dugas |
| Rivière-du-Nord | 13 | Town | Acadian Peninsula | LSD of Anse Bleue |
| Rivière-du-Nord | 13 | Town | Acadian Peninsula | LSD of New Bandon (part) |
| Caraquet | 14 | Town | Acadian Peninsula | Town of Caraquet |
| Caraquet | 14 | Town | Acadian Peninsula | Village of Bas-Caraquet |
| Caraquet | 14 | Town | Acadian Peninsula | LSD of Pokesudie |
| Caraquet | 14 | Town | Acadian Peninsula | LSD of St. Simon |
| Caraquet | 14 | Town | Acadian Peninsula | LSD of Blanchard Settlement |
| Caraquet | 14 | Town | Acadian Peninsula | LSD of Evangéline (part) |
| Caraquet | 14 | Town | Acadian Peninsula | LSD of Pokemouche |
| Caraquet | 14 | Town | Acadian Peninsula | LSD of Caraquet (part) |
| Caraquet | 14 | Town | Acadian Peninsula | LSD of Landry Office (part) |
| Île-de-Lamèque | 15 | Town | Acadian Peninsula | Town of Lamèque |
| Île-de-Lamèque | 15 | Town | Acadian Peninsula | Village of Sainte-Marie-Saint-Raphaël |
| Île-de-Lamèque | 15 | Town | Acadian Peninsula | LSD of Pointe-Canot |
| Île-de-Lamèque | 15 | Town | Acadian Peninsula | LSD of Ste. Cecile |
| Île-de-Lamèque | 15 | Town | Acadian Peninsula | LSD of Pointe-Alexandre |
| Île-de-Lamèque | 15 | Town | Acadian Peninsula | LSD of Petite-Lamèque |
| Île-de-Lamèque | 15 | Town | Acadian Peninsula | LSD of Haut-Lamèque |
| Île-de-Lamèque | 15 | Town | Acadian Peninsula | LSD of Coteau Road |
| Île-de-Lamèque | 15 | Town | Acadian Peninsula | LSD of Pigeon Hill |
| Île-de-Lamèque | 15 | Town | Acadian Peninsula | LSD of Cap-Bateau |
| Île-de-Lamèque | 15 | Town | Acadian Peninsula | LSD of Shippegan (part) (Note: Listed in the white paper as Shippagan, the spelling used by the town) |
| Île-de-Lamèque | 15 | Town | Acadian Peninsula | LSD of Chiasson-Savoy |
| Shippagan | 16 | Town | Acadian Peninsula | Town of Shippagan |
| Shippagan | 16 | Town | Acadian Peninsula | Village of Le Goulet |
| Shippagan | 16 | Town | Acadian Peninsula | LSD of Haut-Shippagan |
| Shippagan | 16 | Town | Acadian Peninsula | LSD of Shippegan (part) |
| Shippagan | 16 | Town | Acadian Peninsula | LSD of Baie du Petit Pokemouche |
| Shippagan | 16 | Town | Acadian Peninsula | LSD of Pointe-Sauvage (Indian Point) |
| Shippagan | 16 | Town | Acadian Peninsula | LSD of Inkerman Centre |
| Shippagan | 16 | Town | Acadian Peninsula | LSD of Evangéline (part) |
| Shippagan | 16 | Town | Acadian Peninsula | LSD of Caraquet (part) |
| Hautes-Terres | 17 | Town | Acadian Peninsula | Village of Saint-Isidore |
| Hautes-Terres | 17 | Town | Acadian Peninsula | Village of Paquetville |
| Hautes-Terres | 17 | Town | Acadian Peninsula | LSD of Paquetville |
| Hautes-Terres | 17 | Town | Acadian Peninsula | LSD of Saint-Isidore |
| Hautes-Terres | 17 | Town | Acadian Peninsula | LSD of Saint-Sauveur |
| Hautes-Terres | 17 | Town | Acadian Peninsula | LSD of the Paroisse Notre-Dame-des-Érables |
| Hautes-Terres | 17 | Town | Acadian Peninsula | LSD of Caraquet (part) |
| Hautes-Terres | 17 | Town | Acadian Peninsula | LSD of Maltempec |
| Tracadie | 18 | Regional municipality | Acadian Peninsula | Regional Municipality of Tracadie |
| Neguac | 19 | Village | Acadian Peninsula | Village of Neguac |
| Alnwick | 20 | Rural community | Greater Miramichi | LSD of Alnwick |
| Alnwick | 20 | Rural community | Greater Miramichi | LSD of Tabusintac |
| Alnwick | 20 | Rural community | Greater Miramichi | LSD of Fair Isle |
| Alnwick | 20 | Rural community | Greater Miramichi | LSD of Oak Point - Bartibog Bridge |
| Miramichi | 21 | City | Greater Miramichi | City of Miramichi |
| Miramichi | 21 | City | Greater Miramichi | LSD of Nelson (part) |
| Miramichi | 21 | City | Greater Miramichi | LSD of Newcastle (part) |
| Miramichi River Valley | 22 | Rural community | Greater Miramichi | Village of Blackville |
| Miramichi River Valley | 22 | Rural community | Greater Miramichi | LSD of Blackville (part) |
| Miramichi River Valley | 22 | Rural community | Greater Miramichi | LSD of Renous-Quarryville |
| Miramichi River Valley | 22 | Rural community | Greater Miramichi | LSD of North Esk (part) |
| Miramichi River Valley | 22 | Rural community | Greater Miramichi | LSD of South Esk (part) |
| Miramichi River Valley | 22 | Rural community | Greater Miramichi | LSD of Derby |
| Miramichi River Valley | 22 | Rural community | Greater Miramichi | LSD of Sunny Corner |
| Miramichi River Valley | 22 | Rural community | Greater Miramichi | LSD of Nelson (part) |
| Miramichi River Valley | 22 | Rural community | Greater Miramichi | LSD of Newcastle (part) |
| Doaktown | 23 | Village | Greater Miramichi | Village of Doaktown |
| Doaktown | 23 | Village | Greater Miramichi | LSD of Blissfield (part) |
| Upper Miramichi | 24 | Rural community | Greater Miramichi | Rural Community of Upper Miramichi |
| Nouvelle-Arcadie | 25 | Village | Kent | Village of Rogersville |
| Nouvelle-Arcadie | 25 | Village | Kent | LSD of Collette |
| Nouvelle-Arcadie | 25 | Village | Kent | LSD of Acadieville |
| Nouvelle-Arcadie | 25 | Village | Kent | LSD of Rogersville |
| Nouvelle-Arcadie | 25 | Village | Kent | LSD of Harcourt (part) |
| Nouvelle-Arcadie | 25 | Village | Kent | LSD of Weldford (part) |
| Nouvelle-Arcadie | 25 | Village | Kent | LSD of Saint-Louis (part) |
| Nouvelle-Arcadie | 25 | Village | Kent | LSD of Nelson (part) |
| Beaurivage | 26 | Town | Kent | Town of Richibucto |
| Beaurivage | 26 | Town | Kent | Village of Saint-Louis de Kent |
| Beaurivage | 26 | Town | Kent | LSD of Saint-Louis (part) |
| Beaurivage | 26 | Town | Kent | LSD of Saint-Ignace |
| Beaurivage | 26 | Town | Kent | LSD of Aldouane |
| Beaurivage | 26 | Town | Kent | LSD of Saint-Charles |
| Five Rivers | 28 | Village | Kent | Village of Rexton |
| Five Rivers | 28 | Village | Kent | LSD of Richibucto (part) |
| Five Rivers | 28 | Village | Kent | LSD of Weldford (part) |
| Five Rivers | 28 | Village | Kent | LSD of Harcourt (part) |
| Five Rivers | 28 | Village | Kent | LSD of Saint-Paul (part) |
| Five Rivers | 28 | Village | Kent | LSD of Cap-de-Richibouctou (part) |
| Grand-Bouctouche | 29 | Town | Kent | Town of Bouctouche |
| Grand-Bouctouche | 29 | Town | Kent | LSD of Wellington (part) |
| Grand-Bouctouche | 29 | Town | Kent | LSD of Sainte-Anne-de-Kent |
| Grand-Bouctouche | 29 | Town | Kent | LSD of Saint Mary (Note: Listed in the white paper as Sainte-Marie) |
| Grand-Bouctouche | 29 | Town | Kent | LSD of Richibucto (part) |
| Champdoré | 30 | Town | Kent | Village of Saint-Antoine |
| Champdoré | 30 | Town | Kent | LSD of Grand Saint-Antoine |
| Champdoré | 30 | Town | Kent | LSD of Wellington (part) |
| Champdoré | 30 | Town | Kent | LSD of Saint-Paul (part) |
| Champdoré | 30 | Town | Kent | LSD of Saint Mary (part) |
| Champdoré | 30 | Town | Kent | LSD of Dundas (part) |
| Champdoré | 30 | Town | Kent | LSD of Harcourt (part) |
| Beausoleil | 31 | Rural community | Kent | Rural Community of Cocagne |
| Beausoleil | 31 | Rural community | Kent | LSD of Dundas (part) |
| Beausoleil | 31 | Rural community | Kent | LSD of Grande-Digue |
| Beausoleil | 31 | Rural community | Kent | LSD of Shediac Bridge-Shediac River |
| Beausoleil | 31 | Rural community | Kent | LSD of Wellington (part) |
| Beausoleil | 31 | Rural community | Kent | LSD of Moncton (part) |
| Beausoleil | 31 | Rural community | Kent | LSD of Shediac (part) |
| Maple Hills | 32 | Rural community | Southeast | LSD of Dundas (part) |
| Maple Hills | 32 | Rural community | Southeast | LSD of Saint-Paul (part) |
| Maple Hills | 32 | Rural community | Southeast | LSD of Moncton (part) |
| Maple Hills | 32 | Rural community | Southeast | LSD of Shediac (part) |
| Salisbury | 33 | Town | Southeast | Village of Salisbury |
| Salisbury | 33 | Town | Southeast | LSD of Coverdale (part) |
| Salisbury | 33 | Town | Southeast | LSD of Salisbury (part) |
| Salisbury | 33 | Town | Southeast | LSD of Moncton (part) |
| Salisbury | 33 | Town | Southeast | LSD of Elgin (part) (Note: Listed in the white paper as Elgin Parish, the name of the Taxing Authority) |
| Moncton | 34 | City | Southeast | City of Moncton |
| Moncton | 34 | City | Southeast | LSD of Moncton (part) |
| Riverview | 35 | Town | Southeast | Town of Riverview |
| Dieppe | 36 | City | Southeast | City of Dieppe |
| Dieppe | 36 | City | Southeast | LSD of Moncton (part) |
| Dieppe | 36 | City | Southeast | LSD of Scoudouc (part) |
| Shediac | 37 | Town | Southeast | Town of Shediac |
| Shediac | 37 | Town | Southeast | LSD of Shediac Cape |
| Shediac | 37 | Town | Southeast | LSD of Scoudouc Road |
| Shediac | 37 | Town | Southeast | LSD of Pointe-du-Chêne |
| Shediac | 37 | Town | Southeast | LSD of Scoudouc (part) |
| Cap-Acadie | 38 | Town | Southeast | Village of Cap-Pelé |
| Cap-Acadie | 38 | Town | Southeast | Rural Community of Beaubassin East |
| Strait Shores | 39 | Rural community | Southeast | Village of Port Elgin |
| Strait Shores | 39 | Rural community | Southeast | LSD of Baie-Verte |
| Strait Shores | 39 | Rural community | Southeast | LSD of Bayfield |
| Strait Shores | 39 | Rural community | Southeast | LSD of Botsford |
| Strait Shores | 39 | Rural community | Southeast | LSD of Cape Tormentine |
| Strait Shores | 39 | Rural community | Southeast | LSD of Westmorland (part) |
| Strait Shores | 39 | Rural community | Southeast | LSD of Murray Corner |
| Tantramar | 40 | Town | Southeast | Town of Sackville |
| Tantramar | 40 | Town | Southeast | Village of Dorchester |
| Tantramar | 40 | Town | Southeast | LSD of Dorchester (part) |
| Tantramar | 40 | Town | Southeast | LSD of Sackville (part) |
| Tantramar | 40 | Town | Southeast | LSD of Pointe de Bute (part) |
| Memramcook | 41 | Village | Southeast | Village of Memramcook |
| Fundy Albert | 42 | Village | Southeast | Village of Alma |
| Fundy Albert | 42 | Village | Southeast | Village of Hillsborough |
| Fundy Albert | 42 | Village | Southeast | Village of Riverside-Albert |
| Fundy Albert | 42 | Village | Southeast | LSD of Hillsborough (part) |
| Fundy Albert | 42 | Village | Southeast | LSD of Harvey (part) |
| Fundy Albert | 42 | Village | Southeast | LSD of Hopewell (part) |
| Fundy Albert | 42 | Village | Southeast | LSD of Alma (part) |
| Fundy Albert | 42 | Village | Southeast | LSD of Coverdale (part) |
| Three Rivers | 43 | Village | Southeast | Village of Petitcodiac |
| Three Rivers | 43 | Village | Southeast | LSD of Elgin (Note: Listed in the white paper as Elgin Centre, the name of the Taxing Authority) |
| Three Rivers | 43 | Village | Southeast | LSD of Elgin Parish (part) |
| Three Rivers | 43 | Village | Southeast | LSD of Salisbury (part) |
| Three Rivers | 43 | Village | Southeast | LSD of Cardwell (part) |
| Butternut Valley | 79 | Rural community | Kings | LSD of Brunswick (part) |
| Butternut Valley | 79 | Rural community | Kings | LSD of Studholm |
| Butternut Valley | 79 | Rural community | Kings | LSD of Johnston (part) |
| Butternut Valley | 79 | Rural community | Kings | LSD of Havelock |
| Sussex | 44 | Town | Kings | Town of Sussex |
| Sussex | 44 | Town | Kings | Village of Sussex Corner |
| Sussex | 44 | Town | Kings | LSD of Sussex (part) |
| Valley Waters | 45 | Village | Kings | Village of Norton |
| Valley Waters | 45 | Village | Kings | LSD of Springfield |
| Valley Waters | 45 | Village | Kings | LSD of Norton (part) |
| Valley Waters | 45 | Village | Kings | LSD of Upham (part) |
| Valley Waters | 45 | Village | Kings | LSD of Kars |
| Valley Waters | 45 | Village | Kings | LSD of Wickham |
| Fundy-St. Martins | 46 | Village | Fundy | Village of St. Martins |
| Fundy-St. Martins | 46 | Village | Fundy | LSD of Saint Martins (part) |
| Fundy-St. Martins | 46 | Village | Fundy | LSD of Simonds (part) |
| Fundy-St. Martins | 46 | Village | Fundy | LSD of Fairfield |
| Hampton | 47 | Town | Fundy | Town of Hampton |
| Hampton | 47 | Town | Fundy | LSD of Hampton |
| Hampton | 47 | Town | Fundy | LSD of Upham (part) |
| Hampton | 47 | Town | Fundy | LSD of Norton (part) |
| Hampton | 47 | Town | Fundy | LSD of Kingston (part) |
| Quispamsis | 48 | Town | Fundy | Town of Quispamsis |
| Rothesay | 49 | Town | Fundy | Town of Rothesay |
| Saint John | 50 | City | Fundy | City of Saint John |
| Grand Bay-Westfield | 51 | Town | Fundy | Town of Grand Bay-Westfield |
| Grand Bay-Westfield | 51 | Town | Fundy | LSD of Westfield (part) |
| Fundy Shores | 52 | Rural community | Southwest | LSD of Musquash |
| Fundy Shores | 52 | Rural community | Southwest | LSD of Lepreau (part) |
| Eastern Charlotte | 53 | Rural community | Southwest | Town of St. George |
| Eastern Charlotte | 53 | Rural community | Southwest | Village of Blacks Harbour |
| Eastern Charlotte | 53 | Rural community | Southwest | LSD of Pennfield (part) |
| Eastern Charlotte | 53 | Rural community | Southwest | LSD of Beaver Harbour |
| Eastern Charlotte | 53 | Rural community | Southwest | LSD of Fundy Bay |
| Eastern Charlotte | 53 | Rural community | Southwest | LSD of St. George (part) |
| Eastern Charlotte | 53 | Rural community | Southwest | LSD of Saint Patrick (part) |
| Grand Manan | 54 | Village | Southwest | Village of Grand Manan |
| Campobello Island | 55 | Rural community | Southwest | Rural Community of Campobello Island |
| Saint Andrews | 56 | Town | Southwest | Town of Saint Andrews |
| Saint Andrews | 56 | Town | Southwest | LSD of Bayside |
| Saint Andrews | 56 | Town | Southwest | LSD of Chamcook |
| St. Stephen | 57 | Town | Southwest | Town of St. Stephen |
| St. Stephen | 57 | Town | Southwest | LSD of Western Charlotte (part) |
| St. Stephen | 57 | Town | Southwest | LSD of St. Stephen |
| St. Stephen | 57 | Town | Southwest | LSD of Dufferin |
| St. Stephen | 57 | Town | Southwest | LSD of Saint David (part) |
| St. Stephen | 57 | Town | Southwest | LSD of Saint James (part) |
| St. Stephen | 57 | Town | Southwest | LSD of Saint Croix (part) |
| St. Stephen | 57 | Town | Southwest | LSD of Dennis-Weston |
| McAdam | 58 | Village | Southwest | Village of McAdam |
| Harvey | 59 | Rural community | Capital Region | Village of Harvey |
| Harvey | 59 | Rural community | Capital Region | LSD of Manners Sutton (part) |
| Harvey | 59 | Rural community | Capital Region | LSD of Dumfries (part) |
| Harvey | 59 | Rural community | Capital Region | LSD of Prince William (part) |
| Harvey | 59 | Rural community | Capital Region | LSD of Kingsclear (part) |
| Harvey | 59 | Rural community | Capital Region | LSD of New Maryland (part) |
| Fredericton Junction | 60 | Village | Capital Region | Village of Fredericton Junction |
| Tracy | 61 | Village | Capital Region | Village of Tracy |
| Hanwell | 62 | Rural community | Capital Region | Rural Community of Hanwell |
| Hanwell | 62 | Rural community | Capital Region | LSD of Kingsclear (part) |
| Sunbury-York South | 63 | Rural community | Capital Region | LSD of Rusagonis-Waasis (part) |
| Sunbury-York South | 63 | Rural community | Capital Region | LSD of New Maryland (part) |
| Sunbury-York South | 63 | Rural community | Capital Region | LSD of Gladstone (part) |
| New Maryland | 64 | Village | Capital Region | Village of New Maryland |
| Oromocto | 65 | Town | Capital Region | Town of Oromocto |
| Oromocto | 65 | Town | Capital Region | LSD of Lincoln (part) |
| Arcadia | 66 | Village | Capital Region | Village of Cambridge-Narrows |
| Arcadia | 66 | Village | Capital Region | Village of Gagetown |
| Arcadia | 66 | Village | Capital Region | LSD of Cambridge |
| Arcadia | 66 | Village | Capital Region | LSD of Upper Gagetown |
| Arcadia | 66 | Village | Capital Region | LSD of Waterborough (part) |
| Arcadia | 66 | Village | Capital Region | LSD of Hampstead |
| Arcadia | 66 | Village | Capital Region | LSD of Canning (part) |
| Grand Lake | 67 | Village | Capital Region | Village of Minto |
| Grand Lake | 67 | Village | Capital Region | Village of Chipman |
| Grand Lake | 67 | Village | Capital Region | LSD of Chipman |
| Grand Lake | 67 | Village | Capital Region | LSD of Northfield (part) |
| Grand Lake | 67 | Village | Capital Region | LSD of Canning (part) |
| Grand Lake | 67 | Village | Capital Region | LSD of Sheffield (part) |
| Grand Lake | 67 | Village | Capital Region | LSD of Harcourt (part) |
| Nashwaak | 68 | Rural community | Capital Region | Village of Stanley |
| Nashwaak | 68 | Rural community | Capital Region | LSD of Stanley (part) |
| Nashwaak | 68 | Rural community | Capital Region | LSD of Saint Marys (part) |
| Nashwaak | 68 | Rural community | Capital Region | LSD of Estey's Bridge (part) |
| Nashwaak | 68 | Rural community | Capital Region | LSD of Douglas (part) |
| Fredericton | 69 | City | Capital Region | City of Fredericton |
| Fredericton | 69 | City | Capital Region | LSD of Saint Marys (part) |
| Fredericton | 69 | City | Capital Region | LSD of Estey's Bridge (part) |
| Fredericton | 69 | City | Capital Region | LSD of Douglas (part) |
| Fredericton | 69 | City | Capital Region | LSD of Rusagonis-Waasis (part) |
| Fredericton | 69 | City | Capital Region | LSD of Lincoln (part) |
| Central York | 70 | Rural community | Capital Region | LSD of Keswick Ridge |
| Central York | 70 | Rural community | Capital Region | LSD of Bright (part) |
| Central York | 70 | Rural community | Capital Region | LSD of Queensbury (part) |
| Central York | 70 | Rural community | Capital Region | LSD of Douglas (part) |
| Central York | 70 | Rural community | Capital Region | LSD of Estey's Bridge (part) |
| Central York | 70 | Rural community | Capital Region | LSD of Kingsclear (part) |
| Nackawic-Millville | 71 | Rural community | Capital Region | Town of Nackawic |
| Nackawic-Millville | 71 | Rural community | Capital Region | Village of Millville |
| Nackawic-Millville | 71 | Rural community | Capital Region | LSD of Southampton (part) |
| Nackawic-Millville | 71 | Rural community | Capital Region | LSD of Queensbury (part) |
| Nackawic-Millville | 71 | Rural community | Capital Region | LSD of Dumfries (part) |
| Nackawic-Millville | 71 | Rural community | Capital Region | LSD of Bright (part) |
| Lakeland Ridges | 72 | Village | Western Valley | Village of Canterbury |
| Lakeland Ridges | 72 | Village | Western Valley | Village of Meductic |
| Lakeland Ridges | 72 | Village | Western Valley | LSD of Benton |
| Lakeland Ridges | 72 | Village | Western Valley | LSD of Canterbury |
| Lakeland Ridges | 72 | Village | Western Valley | LSD of Debec (part) |
| Lakeland Ridges | 72 | Village | Western Valley | LSD of North Lake |
| Lakeland Ridges | 72 | Village | Western Valley | LSD of Woodstock (part) |
| Woodstock | 73 | Town | Western Valley | Town of Woodstock |
| Woodstock | 73 | Town | Western Valley | LSD of Richmond |
| Woodstock | 73 | Town | Western Valley | LSD of Wakefield (Wakefield Inside portion) |
| Woodstock | 73 | Town | Western Valley | LSD of Woodstock (part) |
| Woodstock | 73 | Town | Western Valley | LSD of Upper and Lower Northampton |
| Woodstock | 73 | Town | Western Valley | LSD of Northampton |
| Woodstock | 73 | Town | Western Valley | LSD of Debec (part) |
| Hartland | 74 | Town | Western Valley | Town of Hartland |
| Hartland | 74 | Town | Western Valley | LSD of Somerville |
| Hartland | 74 | Town | Western Valley | LSD of Simonds (part) |
| Hartland | 74 | Town | Western Valley | LSD of Wakefield (Wakefield Outside portion) |
| Hartland | 74 | Town | Western Valley | LSD of Brighton |
| Hartland | 74 | Town | Western Valley | LSD of Coldstream |
| Hartland | 74 | Town | Western Valley | LSD of Bright (part) |
| Hartland | 74 | Town | Western Valley | LSD of Peel (part) |
| Carleton North | 76 | Town | Western Valley | Town of Florenceville-Bristol |
| Carleton North | 76 | Town | Western Valley | Village of Bath |
| Carleton North | 76 | Town | Western Valley | Village of Centreville |
| Carleton North | 76 | Town | Western Valley | LSD of Glassville |
| Carleton North | 76 | Town | Western Valley | LSD of Upper Kent |
| Carleton North | 76 | Town | Western Valley | LSD of Wicklow |
| Carleton North | 76 | Town | Western Valley | LSD of Peel (part) |
| Carleton North | 76 | Town | Western Valley | LSD of Wilmot |
| Carleton North | 76 | Town | Western Valley | LSD of Lakeville |
| Carleton North | 76 | Town | Western Valley | LSD of Aberdeen |
| Carleton North | 76 | Town | Western Valley | LSD of Kent (part) |
| Carleton North | 76 | Town | Western Valley | LSD of Simonds (part) |
| Southern Victoria | 77 | Village | Western Valley | Village of Aroostook |
| Southern Victoria | 77 | Village | Western Valley | Village of Perth-Andover |
| Southern Victoria | 77 | Village | Western Valley | LSD of Andover (part) |
| Southern Victoria | 77 | Village | Western Valley | LSD of Perth (part) |
| Tobique Valley | 78 | Village | Western Valley | Village of Plaster Rock |
| Tobique Valley | 78 | Village | Western Valley | LSD of Gordon (part) |
| Tobique Valley | 78 | Village | Western Valley | LSD of Riley Brook |
| Tobique Valley | 78 | Village | Western Valley | LSD of Lorne (part) |

== List of regional service commissions ==
The local governance reform will continue the existence of New Brunswick's 12 regional service commissions. Each regional service commission will have one rural district. Two RSCs were renamed in 2023.

- Acadian Peninsula
- Capital Region (formerly Regional Service Commission 11)
- Chaleur
- Fundy
- Greater Miramichi
- Kent
- Kings (formerly Regional Service Commission 8)
- Northwest
- Restigouche
- Southeast
- Southwest New Brunswick
- Western Valley

== List of rural districts ==
The local governance reform will result in 12 rural districts. The proposed names of the rural districts were announced on May 25, 2022 and became official on July 21, 2022 when the Rural Districts Establishment Regulation was filed.

| Name | RD No. | Regional service commission | Local service district |
|---|---|---|---|
| Northwest | 1 | Northwest | Drummond (part) |
| Northwest | 1 | Northwest | Madawaska |
| Northwest | 1 | Northwest | Saint-Basile |
| Northwest | 1 | Northwest | Saint-Jacques (part) |
| Northwest | 1 | Northwest | Saint-Joseph (part) |
| Northwest | 1 | Northwest | Saint-Quentin (part) |
| Northwest | 1 | Northwest | Rivière-Verte (part) |
| Northwest | 1 | Northwest | Notre-Dame-de-Lourdes (part) |
| Northwest | 1 | Northwest | Sainte-Anne (part) |
| Northwest | 1 | Northwest | Saint-Léonard (part) |
| Restigouche | 2 | Restigouche | Addington (part) |
| Restigouche | 2 | Restigouche | Chaleur (part) |
| Restigouche | 2 | Restigouche | Eldon (part) |
| Restigouche | 2 | Restigouche | Flatlands |
| Restigouche | 2 | Restigouche | Lorne |
| Restigouche | 2 | Restigouche | Mann Mountain |
| Restigouche | 2 | Restigouche | Balmoral (part) |
| Chaleur | 3 | Chaleur | Allardville |
| Chaleur | 3 | Chaleur | Bathurst (part) |
| Chaleur | 3 | Chaleur | Beresford (part) |
| Chaleur | 3 | Chaleur | Big River (part) |
| Chaleur | 3 | Chaleur | New Bandon-Salmon Beach |
| Chaleur | 3 | Chaleur | New Bandon (part) |
| Acadian Peninsula | 4 | Acadian Peninsula | Miscou Island |
| Greater Miramichi | 5 | Greater Miramichi | Black River-Hardwicke |
| Greater Miramichi | 5 | Greater Miramichi | Blackville (part) |
| Greater Miramichi | 5 | Greater Miramichi | Chatham |
| Greater Miramichi | 5 | Greater Miramichi | Lower Newcastle-Russellville (Note: Listed in the white paper as Ferry Road-Russellville, the original name of the LSD, changed in 1995 after Ferry Road was annexed by Miramichi) |
| Greater Miramichi | 5 | Greater Miramichi | Glenelg |
| Greater Miramichi | 5 | Greater Miramichi | Nelson (part) |
| Greater Miramichi | 5 | Greater Miramichi | Newcastle (part) |
| Greater Miramichi | 5 | Greater Miramichi | North Esk (part) |
| Greater Miramichi | 5 | Greater Miramichi | South Esk (part) |
| Greater Miramichi | 5 | Greater Miramichi | St. Margarets |
| Greater Miramichi | 5 | Greater Miramichi | Hardwicke (part) |
| Greater Miramichi | 5 | Greater Miramichi | Blissfield (part) |
| Kent | 6 | Kent | Harcourt (part) |
| Kent | 6 | Kent | Carleton |
| Kent | 6 | Kent | Pointe-Sapin |
| Kent | 6 | Kent | Cap-de-Richibouctou (part) |
| Kent | 6 | Kent | Baie Ste. Anne |
| Kent | 6 | Kent | Hardwicke (part) |
| Kent | 6 | Kent | Escuminac |
| Kent | 6 | Kent | Saint-Louis (part) |
| Southeast | 7 | Southeast | Dorchester (part) |
| Southeast | 7 | Southeast | Coverdale (part) |
| Southeast | 7 | Southeast | Westmorland (part) |
| Southeast | 7 | Southeast | Alma (part) |
| Southeast | 7 | Southeast | Hillsborough (part) |
| Southeast | 7 | Southeast | Hopewell (part) |
| Southeast | 7 | Southeast | Moncton (part) |
| Southeast | 7 | Southeast | Harvey (part) |
| Southeast | 7 | Southeast | Sackville (part) |
| Southeast | 7 | Southeast | Elgin (part) |
| Southeast | 7 | Southeast | Salisbury (part) |
| Kings | 8 | 8 | Cardwell (part) |
| Kings | 8 | 8 | Waterford |
| Kings | 8 | 8 | Upham (part) |
| Kings | 8 | 8 | Hammond |
| Kings | 8 | 8 | Sussex (part) |
| Kings | 8 | 8 | Johnston (part) |
| Kings | 8 | 8 | Havelock (part) |
| Kings | 8 | 8 | Norton (part) |
| Kings | 8 | 8 | Brunswick (part) |
| Fundy | 9 | Fundy | Petersville |
| Fundy | 9 | Fundy | Greenwich |
| Fundy | 9 | Fundy | Westfield (part) |
| Fundy | 9 | Fundy | Kingston (part) |
| Fundy | 9 | Fundy | Norton (part) |
| Fundy | 9 | Fundy | Saint Martins (part) |
| Fundy | 9 | Fundy | Simonds (part) |
| Fundy | 9 | Fundy | Rothesay |
| Southwest | 10 | Southwest | Dumbarton |
| Southwest | 10 | Southwest | McAdam |
| Southwest | 10 | Southwest | West Isles |
| Southwest | 10 | Southwest | White Head Island |
| Southwest | 10 | Southwest | Pennfield (part) |
| Southwest | 10 | Southwest | Saint George (part) |
| Southwest | 10 | Southwest | Saint James (part) |
| Southwest | 10 | Southwest | Western Charlotte (part) |
| Southwest | 10 | Southwest | Saint David (part) |
| Southwest | 10 | Southwest | Saint Croix (part) |
| Southwest | 10 | Southwest | Saint Patrick (part) |
| Southwest | 10 | Southwest | Lepreau (part) |
| Capital Region | 11 | Capital Region | Burton |
| Capital Region | 11 | Capital Region | Clarendon |
| Capital Region | 11 | Capital Region | Gladstone (part) |
| Capital Region | 11 | Capital Region | Maugerville |
| Capital Region | 11 | Capital Region | Noonan |
| Capital Region | 11 | Capital Region | Stanley (part) |
| Capital Region | 11 | Capital Region | Sheffield (part) |
| Capital Region | 11 | Capital Region | Canning (part) |
| Capital Region | 11 | Capital Region | New Maryland (part) |
| Capital Region | 11 | Capital Region | Blissville |
| Capital Region | 11 | Capital Region | Wirral-Enniskillen |
| Capital Region | 11 | Capital Region | Bright (part) |
| Capital Region | 11 | Capital Region | Prince William (part) |
| Capital Region | 11 | Capital Region | Saint Marys (part) |
| Capital Region | 11 | Capital Region | Chipman (part) |
| Capital Region | 11 | Capital Region | Dumfries (part) |
| Capital Region | 11 | Capital Region | Southampton (part) |
| Capital Region | 11 | Capital Region | Northfield (part) |
| Capital Region | 11 | Capital Region | Manners Sutton (part) |
| Capital Region | 11 | Capital Region | Douglas (part) |
| Capital Region | 11 | Capital Region | Waterborough (part) |
| Capital Region | 11 | Capital Region | Rusagonis-Waasis (part) |
| Western Valley | 12 | Western Valley | Gordon (part) |
| Western Valley | 12 | Western Valley | Kent (part) |
| Western Valley | 12 | Western Valley | Lorne (part) |
| Western Valley | 12 | Western Valley | Perth (part) |
| Western Valley | 12 | Western Valley | Denmark |
| Western Valley | 12 | Western Valley | Andover |

== See also ==
New Brunswick

- Administrative divisions of New Brunswick
- List of communities in New Brunswick
- List of local service districts in New Brunswick
- List of municipal amalgamations in New Brunswick
- List of municipalities in New Brunswick
- List of parishes in New Brunswick
- 2022 New Brunswick municipal elections

Elsewhere in Canada

- 2000–06 municipal reorganization in Quebec
- 2002–2006 municipal reorganization of Montreal
- 2015 Manitoba municipal amalgamations
- Amalgamation of the Halifax Regional Municipality
- Amalgamation of Toronto
- Edmonton annexations
