= Balmoral, New Brunswick =

Balmoral
- Community (Dissolved village)
- Seal

- Location within New Brunswick.
- Coordinates: 47.966667°N 66.45°W
- Country: Canada
- Province: New Brunswick
- County: Restigouche
- Parish: Balmoral
- Municipality: Bois-Joli
- Settled: ca. 1850
- Incorporated: 1972
- Amalgamated: 2023
- Electoral Districts Federal: Madawaska—Restigouche
- Provincial: Restigouche West

Area
  - Land: 43.33 km^{2} (16.73 sq mi)

Population (2021)
  - Total: 1,603
  - Density: 37/km^{2} (96/sq mi)
  - Change 2016-2021: ▼4.2%
  - Dwellings: 713
- Time zone: UTC-4 (AST)
  - Summer (DST): UTC-3 (ADT)
- Postal code(s): E8E
- Area code: 506
- Access Routes: Route 275
- Median Income*: CA$63,744
- Website: balmoralnb.com
- Median household income, 2015 (all households)

Balmoral is a community in the village of Bois-Joli in Restigouche County, New Brunswick. It held village status prior to 2023 and is now part of the village of Bois-Joli. It is approximately 10 kilometres south of Dalhousie. Balmoral also contains the neighbourhoods of Blair Athol, Saint-Maure, Selwood, and Upper Balmoral.

== History ==
The area was settled in the 1850s by Joseph Drapeau. When a later contingent of settlers from Scotland arrived, they gave the community its present name after Balmoral Castle.

On 1 January 2023, Balmoral amalgamated with the neighbouring village of Eel River Crossing and all or part of five local service districts to form the new village of Bois-Joli. The community's name remains in official use.

== Demographics ==
In the 2021 Census of Population conducted by Statistics Canada, Balmoral had a population of 1,603 living in 687 of its 713 total private dwellings, a change of −4.2% from its 2016 population of 1,674. With a land area of 43.33 km^{2} (16.73 sq mi), it had a population density of 37.0/km^{2} (95.8/sq mi) in 2021.

Population trend

Census	Population	Change (%)
2021	1,603	▼4.2%
2016	1,674	▼2.6%
2011	1,719	▲0.8%
2006	1,709	▼7.1%
2001	1,836	▼7.0%
1996	1,975	▲1.3%
1991	1,949	N/A

=== Language ===
Mother tongue (2016)

Language	Population	Pct (%)
French only	1,545	92.51%
English only	105	6.29%
Both English and French	20	1.20%

== Economy ==
Forestry is the most important industry in the village.

== See also ==
- List of communities in New Brunswick
