= Valley Waters =

- Village
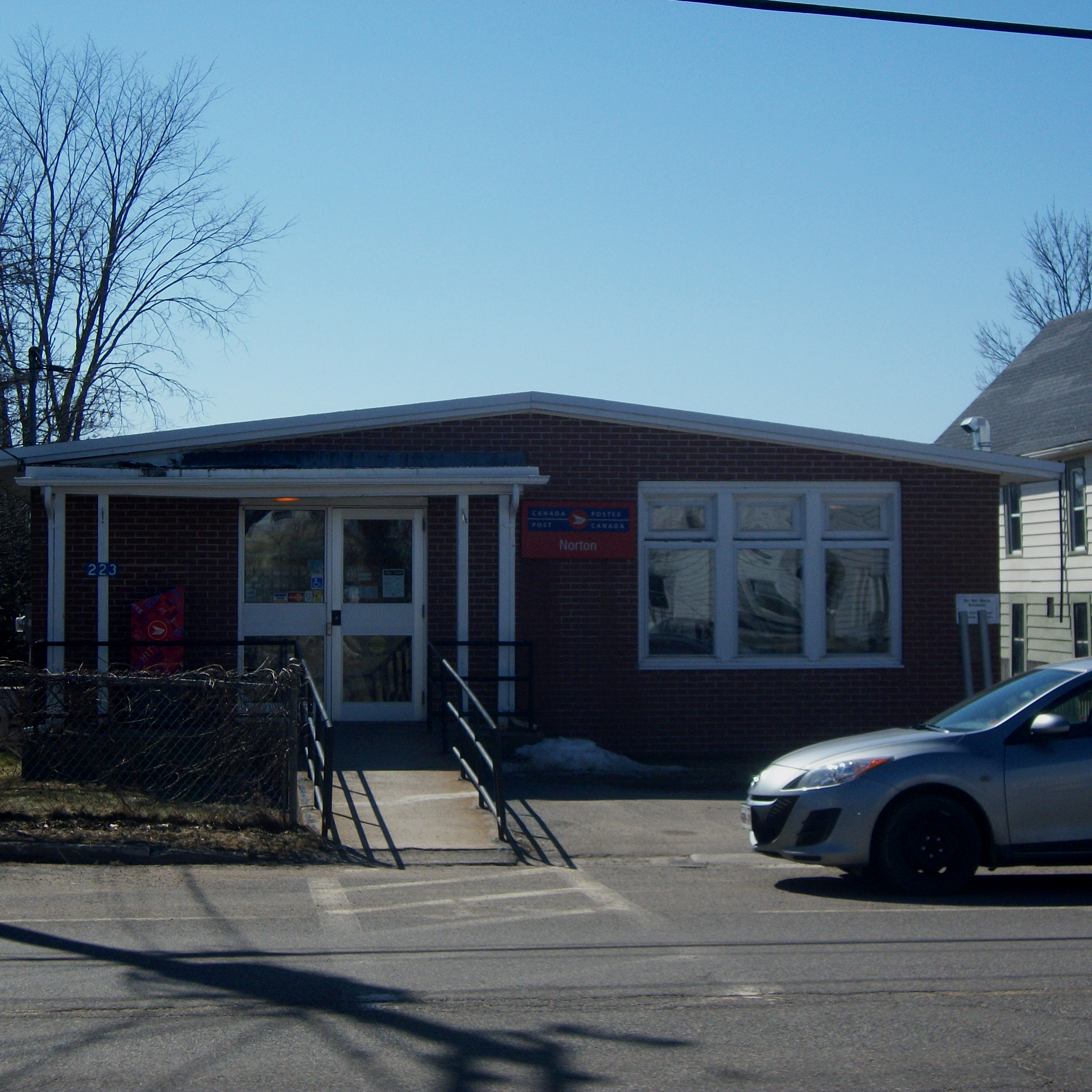

- Location within New Brunswick
- Coordinates: 45°38′19.3″N 65°41′43.8″W
- Country: Canada
- Province: New Brunswick
- County: Kings
- Regional service commission: Kings
- Incorporated: January 1, 2023

Government
  - Mayor: Randy McKnight
  - MP: Rob Moore
  - Provincial Representative: Bill Oliver
- Time zone: UTC-4 (AST)
  - Summer (DST): UTC-3 (ADT)

Valley Waters is a village in the Canadian province of New Brunswick. It was formed through the 2023 New Brunswick local governance reforms which merged the village of Norton and all or part of five local service districts to form Valley Waters, a village municipality.

== Geography ==
Valley Waters is situated on the Kennebecasis River 55 kilometres northeast of Saint John. The European and North American Railway began serving Norton in 1859. Valley Waters is home to the oldest fossil forest in Canada.

== Present day ==
Family Frolic Days used to be an annual village festival.

Country music singer Chris Cummings and rock musician, Ian Sherwood, of "Down With The Butterfly" and "Acres and Acres" are both natives of Valley Waters.

Norton Elementary School, located at the intersection of Route 121 and Route 124, serves Valley Waters students from kindergarten to grade five. It is a small, rural school is closely tied with the local community. French immersion is not offered at Norton Elementary but students can be bussed to Sussex Elementary if families wish to enroll students in French immersion before Middle School. Students are bussed to Sussex Middle after grade five and continue on to Sussex Regional High School afterward.

Valley Waters is situated within the shale gas exploration area currently licensed to Corridor Resources.

== See also ==
- List of communities in New Brunswick
- List of municipalities in New Brunswick
