= North Carlton =

North Carlton may refer to:

- North Carlton, Lincolnshire, a village in Lincolnshire, England
- North Carlton, Nottinghamshire, a suburb of Carlton in Lindrick, England
- Carlton North, a suburb of Melbourne, Victoria, Australia

== See also ==
- North Carleton, an area in Prince Edward Island, Canada
- Carleton North (disambiguation)
