= Bois-Joli =

Village in New Brunswick, Canada

- Village
- Location within New Brunswick
- Coordinates: 48°00′45″N 66°25′15″W
- Country: Canada
- Province: New Brunswick
- County: Restigouche
- Regional service commission: Restigouche
- Incorporated: January 1, 2023
- Electoral Districts Federal: Madawaska—Restigouche
- Provincial: Restigouche West

Government
  - Mayor: Mario Pelletier
- Time zone: UTC-4 (AST)
  - Summer (DST): UTC-3 (ADT)
- Postal code(s): E8E
- Area code: 506
- Highways Route 11: Route 275; Route 280

Bois-Joli is a village in the Canadian province of New Brunswick. It was formed through the 2023 New Brunswick local governance reforms.

== History ==
Bois-Joli was incorporated on January 1, 2023, through the amalgamation of the former villages of Balmoral and Eel River Crossing as well as the concurrent annexation of adjacent unincorporated areas.

== Economy ==
Forestry is the most important industry in the village.

== See also ==
- List of municipalities in New Brunswick
