= Carleton North, New Brunswick =

Carleton North
- Regional Municipality
- District of Carleton North
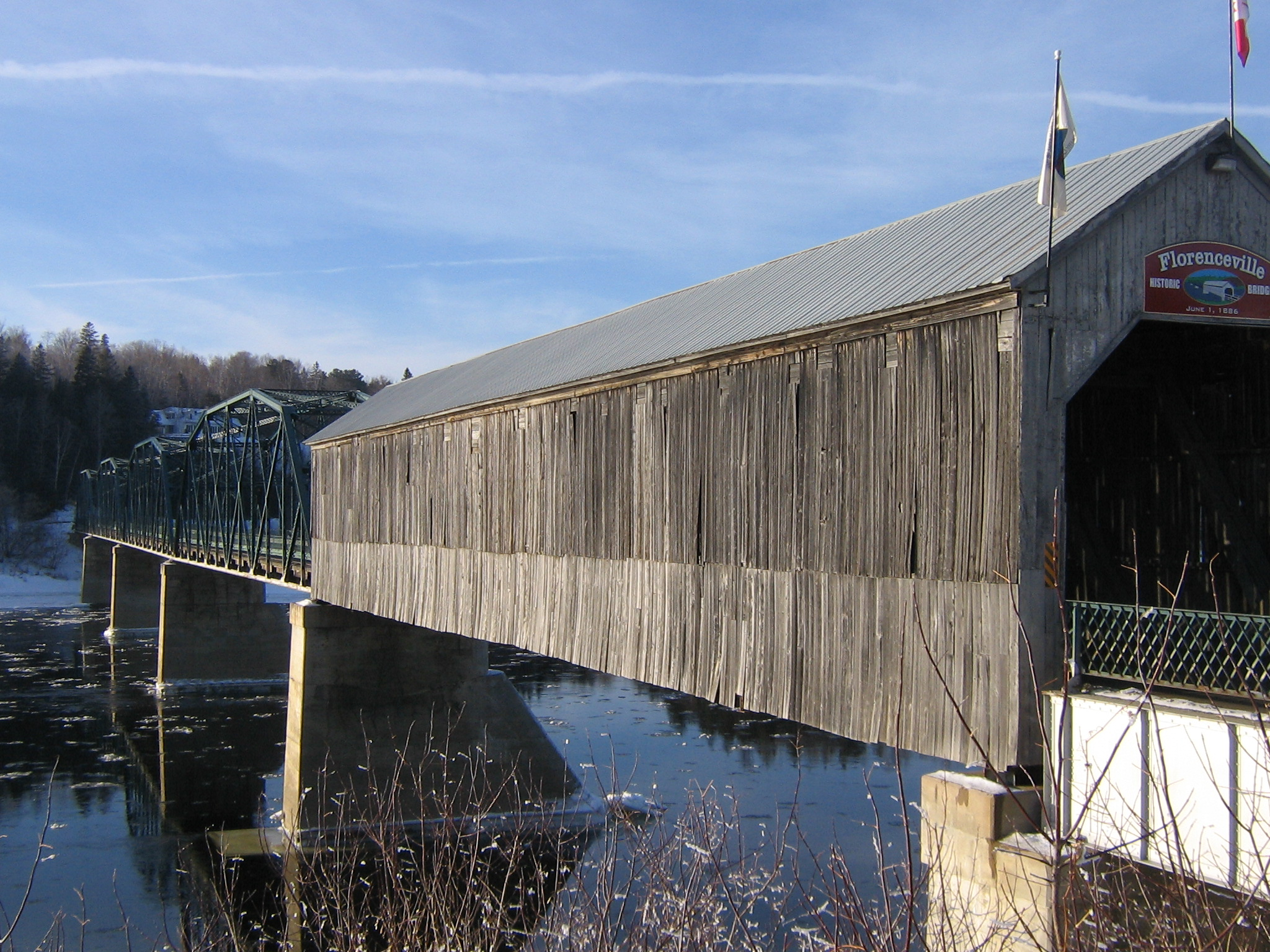
- The Florenceville Bridge across the Saint John River is partly covered.

- Location within New Brunswick
- Coordinates: 46°26′36″N 67°36′54″W
- Country: Canada
- Province: New Brunswick
- County: Carleton County
- Regional service commission: Western Valley
- Incorporated: January 1, 2023

Government
  - Type: Town council
  - Mayor: Andrew Harvey
  - MP: Richard Bragdon
  - MLA: Margaret Johnson
- Elevation: 150 m (490 ft)
- Time zone: UTC-4 (AST)
  - Summer (DST): UTC-3 (ADT)
- Postal code(s): E7J, E7L
- Area code: 506
- Telephone Exchange(s): 221, 245, 246, 276, 278, 391, 392, 595

Carleton North is a town in the Canadian province of New Brunswick. It was formed through the 2023 New Brunswick local governance reforms.

== History ==
Carleton North was incorporated on January 1, 2023 via the amalgamation of the former town of Florenceville-Bristol and the former villages of Bath and Centreville as well as the concurrent annexation of adjacent unincorporated areas.

== Economy ==
Carleton North is home to the corporate headquarters for McCain Foods, the largest producer of French fries in the world. McCain also operates the Florenceville Airport, with a single paved runway located amid agricultural fields on the west side of the river.

Mountain View Packers is another potato-centred business that calls Carleton North home. Mountain View Packers is a business that specializes in the processing of potatoes and cauliflower for the fresh market. Mountain View Packers sources all of their potatoes from local farmers while the cauliflower is grown on site at their own farm.

Carleton North is also home to H.J. Crabbe & Sons Lumber Mill. This long-running family business specializes in its quality softwood lumber made mainly from Balsam Fir and White Spruce. The company has also recently built a new mill in the town to produce wood stove pellets in order to use more of what would be scrap material to help cut down on waste. The company is also one of the largest landowners in the province, next to Irving and Frasier.

A.N.D. Communications & Graphics is a graphics company situated in Carleton North. A.N.D. Communications & Graphics specializes in providing the local area with signage and local advertisement solutions.

BWS Manufacturing is a family run company located in Carleton North where they specialize in the production of trailers for the agriculture, construction, forestry and commercial industries. BWS Manufacturing has been a major employer and contributor to the local economy for the past 48 years in Carleton North.

Metalfab Ltd. is another company that has called Carleton North home since 1967, employing 40 people from the surrounding areas. Metalfab Ltd. is specialized in building custom fire trucks for their customers depending on their needs.

HSF Foods Ltd. is also located in Carleton North and has been located in the village since 2006. HSF Foods Ltd. processes fresh potatoes into dehydrated potato flakes for industries around the world.

Centreville Equipment Ltd. is an agricultural based company located in Carleton North. They sell farm equipment and parts to the surrounding areas.

== Education ==
Carleton North had schools offering grades 1 through 12 until 1956 when the Florenceville Regional High School was opened accommodating grades 7 through 12. The original schools became the elementary schools. Eventually these were replaced by an elementary school on the east side of the river. The Regional High School became a middle school when Carleton North High School was built in Bristol, NB. It was later decided that starting in the year 1996 the middle school students would not begin high school until grade 9.

Bristol is the home of Carleton North High School as well as Bristol Elementary School.

There is a K-8 school, Centreville Community School, located in the centre of the neighborhood of Centreville, housing approx. 250 students. This is part of ASD-W (Previously school district 14). Before the school became a community school there was an elementary school located on the same grounds as what was then the Centreville Middle School. Centreville Elementary School was closed in 2004 and the grades consolidated into one building: Centreville Community School. The old elementary school was torn down in 2011.

Carleton North is one of several communities within Carleton County that historically participated in the annual Potato Break. Potato Break was a 2 & 1/2 week break from school around potato harvesting time (mid-September through early October) that allowed students the opportunity to help with the potato harvest, although working on the break was not mandatory. Schools that participated in Potato Break began classes in early August to compensate for the time taken off for Potato Break. This affected all feeder schools for Carleton North High School. Many of the other schools in the nearby areas did not participate in Potato Break because of one simple reason; less potatoes grown. These schools start school after Labor Day. The need for Potato Break was under review by the DEC and School District 14. For many years now, mechanization in the fields has vastly reduced the need for student labor.

Update: Potato Break was once again publicly reviewed in 2010/2011 and it was decided by the DEC, the Superintendent for School District 14 and the Minister of Education that a new system be put in place. Students who choose to work for a farmer and who are of minimum age to be working in the harvest are allowed time out of class over the harvest period; resources have been put in place by the school district to enable these students to keep up with their studies.

The Bath Community School currently enrolls 188 students from Kindergarten to grade 8. The school is in the Anglophone West School District. The Bath Elementary School was recently closed and students moved to the Bath Middle School directly beside. This "new" school was named Bath Community School and the current principal is Mitchell Hemphill. The Bath Community School is receiving $250,000 investment from the provincial government to aid in planning of upcoming renovations. The funds will be directed to the 2017-2018 capital budget.

== Religion ==
Carleton North is within the region of New Brunswick referred to as the "Bible Belt," and it has a high number of churches in relation to the small population of the area.

== Politics ==
The Member of Parliament for the Tobique-Mactuquac riding in the House of Commons of Canada is PC MP Richard Bragdon.

Member of Legislative Assembly for the Carleton-Victoria riding is Margaret Johnson. Elected in 2020, Margaret Johnson serves the residents of Carleton North on a provincial level. Johnson is the New Brunswick Minister of Agriculture, Aquaculture, and Fisheries.

== Physical geography ==
Carleton North lies within the Appalachian Mountain Range. The town sits in the Saint John River Valley. On each side of the town lie rolling mountains peaking at 300–400 metres. The borough of Florenceville lies on a flat that has extremely rich soil due to past volcanic activity before the last ice age. The borough of Bristol also lies on a flat, but much lower to the river and lower parts of the borough floods during the spring.

== Geology ==
The bedrock underlying Carleton North at its oldest is part of the White Head Formation consisting of limestone and calcareous shales of Late Ordovician to Early Silurian in age. Later in history more sedimentary rocks were deposited forming the Smyrna Mills Formation during the Silurian, consisting of shales, limestones, and conglomerates. The range of mountains from North to South along the Eastern side of the Saint John River known as Carr Mountain, The Pinnacle, and Oakland Mountain (N to S) are also part of the Smyrna Mills Formation and consist of mafic volcanic flows (basalt) and tuff. Within these mountains there are also two gabbro tubes that are Early Devonian in age. These tubes probably were the magma feeding tubes for volcanic flow that would have once overlain the existing rock, but have since been eroded. Carleton North is also extensively terraced with sands and gravels from both the workings of the Saint John River and its tributaries and also from the existence of a huge post-glacial lake that existed in the area for some time after the last Ice Age. In the areas that the bedrock is not covered by this aggregate material, the bedrock is covered by a thin veneer of glacial till. There is also an extensive fault trending through Carleton North from NE to SW which the Saint John River follows for a short distance through the town, causing its seemingly odd bend in flow in the local area.

== Climate ==
The town gets a fair amount of precipitation, although major paralyzing snow and rain storms such as blizzards and hurricanes are uncommon but do happen on occasion. On average, Carleton North receives approximately 1100 mm of precipitation per year. Snowfall is common between late November and early April, and snow usually stays on the ground beginning in December. Flooding occurs during the spring of most years and affects the low-lying areas of Carleton North.

Climate data for Carleton North
Month	Jan	Feb	Mar	Apr	May	Jun	Jul	Aug	Sep	Oct	Nov	Dec	Year
Record high °C (°F)	12.0 (53.6)	11.0 (51.8)	19.5 (67.1)	30.0 (86.0)	35.0 (95.0)	35.0 (95.0)	35.0 (95.0)	35.0 (95.0)	31.0 (87.8)	26.1 (79.0)	19.0 (66.2)	13.3 (55.9)	35.0 (95.0)
Mean daily maximum °C (°F)	−6.2 (20.8)	−4.4 (24.1)	1.4 (34.5)	8.5 (47.3)	17.2 (63.0)	21.9 (71.4)	24.6 (76.3)	23.6 (74.5)	17.9 (64.2)	10.8 (51.4)	3.6 (38.5)	−4.0 (24.8)	9.6 (49.3)
Mean daily minimum °C (°F)	−16.9 (1.6)	−15.4 (4.3)	−9.0 (15.8)	−1.6 (29.1)	4.3 (39.7)	9.3 (48.7)	12.1 (53.8)	11.2 (52.2)	6.2 (43.2)	1.4 (34.5)	−4.1 (24.6)	−13.7 (7.3)	−1.4 (29.5)
Record low °C (°F)	−37.2 (−35.0)	−37.8 (−36.0)	−31.1 (−24.0)	−17.8 (0.0)	−10.0 (14.0)	−2.2 (28.0)	0.0 (32.0)	−3.5 (25.7)	−7.0 (19.4)	−10.0 (14.0)	−21.0 (−5.8)	−37.0 (−34.6)	−37.8 (−36.0)
Average precipitation mm (inches)	80.8 (3.18)	54.9 (2.16)	88.5 (3.48)	78.9 (3.11)	97.5 (3.84)	101.4 (3.99)	95.7 (3.77)	100.0 (3.94)	99.1 (3.90)	87.6 (3.45)	93.1 (3.67)	91.8 (3.61)	1,069.3 (42.10)
Source: 1971-2000 Environment Canada

== Attractions ==
It also has a free public art gallery. The Andrew and Laura McCain Gallery is a non-profit, community-supported gallery that shows about nine exhibitions a year of everything from exhibitions on loan from the National Gallery of Canada to the work of local school children.

Carleton North is also home to the New Brunswick Potato Museum (Potato World) and Shogomoc Historical Railway Site. The Shogomoc Historical Railway Site showcases a restored CPR train station and three CPR cars and is home to FRESH "fine dining". Hunter Brothers Farm Market and Corn Maze.

The town celebrates many festivals throughout the year; Festival of Flavour, which takes place August and showcases a variety of wine related events, Canada Day-July, Snow Blast- February, Haunted Train October, Buttermilk Creek Fall Festival-September and more.

Throughout the summer season, July to September, the town is host to an outdoor summer market, every Thursday from 10-2 pm at the Riverside Park. The outdoor summer market features food, produce, craft, woodworking, flower, baked goods, local meat and jewellery vendors. Each week showcases a different musical performance from local entertainers.

The town is the site of the Florenceville Bridge, a covered bridge built in 1907 that is unique in New Brunswick in combining a wooden covered bridge with steel trusses for the central spans over the Saint John River.

Located just outside the town limits is a replica Noah's Ark, a 2/3-scale model of the Biblical Ark that Noah built, as described in the Christian Old Testament. The replica ark contains the offices and student dorms for a private Bible school, The School of The Spirit, run by the Burnham Road Ministries. The sight of a 300-foot boat in the middle of potato fields within sight of Bristol and Oakland Mountain often attracts curious visitors.

== Charitable organizations ==
Carleton North has active charitable organizations in the community:

The Knights of Columbus is an international group of Catholic men taking charitable action. Charity is their main focus and the organization works hard to improve quality of life in Carleton North. The Grand Knight of the Bath branch is Hermel Langlais.

The Lions Club is the largest service club organization. The club has multiple projects in the village all directed towards charitable actions. The President of the Bath Lions Club is Gerald Sullivan.

The River View Manor is a non-profit and registered charitable organization located in Carleton North, New Brunswick. The River View Manor opened in 1981 and is a beneficial contributor to the town of Carleton North economy. There are 39 residents in the manor and over 50 employees.

== Events ==
River Run is a recently established tradition for the town of Carleton North. Kayaks and canoes paddle down the St. John River each year on New Brunswick day from Bath to Florenceville-Bristol.

Bath Fall Fair has been a tradition in the Village of Bath since Labor Day in 1944. The fair takes place each year at the Bath Fair Grounds during Labour Day weekend. It begins with a parade throughout the town and continues with other events including:

Western New Brunswick International Balloon Festival begins in Carleton North on the Thursday before Labor Day and ends on the Monday. The festival occurs on the Bath Fair Grounds and is a family friendly event that gives locals an opportunity to experience hot air balloon rides and the beauty of witnessing a balloon festival.

Trevor-Goodine Professional Lumberjack Competition is held on Labour Day at the Bath Fair Grounds. It is a Maritime Lumberjack Association sanctioned event.

== Notable people ==
Carleton North is the birthplace of Buzz Hargrove, former president of the Canadian Auto Workers, Rev. Brent Hawkes, and Charlotte MacLeod, mystery fiction writer.

== See also ==
- List of communities in New Brunswick
- List of municipalities in New Brunswick
