= Central York =

- Rural community
- Location within New Brunswick
- Country: Canada
- Province: New Brunswick
- Regional service commission: Capital Region
- Incorporated: January 1, 2023

Government
  - Type: Rural community council
  - Mayor: David R. Duplessis
- Time zone: UTC-4 (AST)
  - Summer (DST): UTC-3 (ADT)

Central York is a rural community in the Canadian province of New Brunswick. It was formed through the 2023 New Brunswick local governance reforms.

== History ==
Central York was incorporated on January 1, 2023 from previously unincorporated areas.

== See also ==
- List of communities in New Brunswick
- List of municipalities in New Brunswick
