= Alnwick, New Brunswick =

Alnwick
- Rural community
- Location within New Brunswick
- Country: Canada
- Province: New Brunswick
- Regional service commission: Greater Miramichi
- Incorporated: January 1, 2023

Government
  - Mayor: Ernest Yvon Robichaud
- Time zone: UTC-4 (AST)
  - Summer (DST): UTC-3 (ADT)

Alnwick is an incorporated rural community jurisdiction in the Canadian province of New Brunswick. It was formed through the 2023 New Brunswick local governance reforms which saw the consolidation of administrative and local government units into districts or regions.

== History ==
Alnwick was incorporated on January 1, 2023 from formerly unincorporated areas.

== See also ==
- List of communities in New Brunswick
- List of municipalities in New Brunswick
