= Butternut Valley, New Brunswick =

Butternut Valley
- Rural community
- Location within New Brunswick
- Country: Canada
- Province: New Brunswick
- Regional service commission: Kings
- Incorporated: January 1, 2023

Government
  - Type: Rural community council
  - Mayor: Alan Brown
- Time zone: UTC-4 (AST)
  - Summer (DST): UTC-3 (ADT)

Butternut Valley is a rural community in the Canadian province of New Brunswick. It was formed through the 2023 New Brunswick local governance reforms.

== History ==
Butternut Valley was incorporated on January 1, 2023, from formerly unincorporated areas, including certain areas of Local Service Districts Cardwell, Havelock, Springfield and Studholm (Kings Co.), Brunswick, Johnson, Waterbourough (Queens), and Salisbury (Westmorland Co.). Havelock was once known as Butternut Ridge.

== See also ==
- www.butternutvalley.ca
