= Fundy Shores =

- Rural community
- Location within New Brunswick
- Country: Canada
- Province: New Brunswick
- Regional service commission: Southwest
- Incorporated: January 1, 2023

Government
  - Mayor: George (Denny) Cogswell
- Time zone: UTC-4 (AST)
  - Summer (DST): UTC-3 (ADT)

Fundy Shores is a rural community in the Canadian province of New Brunswick. It was formed through the 2023 New Brunswick local governance reforms.

== History ==
Fundy Shores was incorporated on January 1, 2023, from previously unincorporated areas.

== See also ==
- List of communities in New Brunswick
- List of municipalities in New Brunswick
