= Sunbury-York South =

- Rural community
- Location within New Brunswick
- Country: Canada
- Province: New Brunswick
- Regional service commission: Capital Region
- Incorporated: January 1, 2023

Government
  - Type: Rural community council
  - Mayor: Cory Allen
- Time zone: UTC-4 (AST)
  - Summer (DST): UTC-3 (ADT)

Sunbury-York South is a rural community in the Canadian province of New Brunswick. It was formed through the 2023 New Brunswick local governance reforms.

== History ==
Sunbury-York South was incorporated on January 1, 2023 from previously unincorporated areas and one of the few newly formed local governments that did not include a previously incorporated village, town or city. The local government includes the communities of Nasonworth, Beaverdam, Rusagonis, and Waasis. During its early years, the administration offices were local in Oromocto.

== See also ==
- List of communities in New Brunswick
- List of municipalities in New Brunswick
