= Regional service commission =

Administrative divisions in New Brunswick, Canada

A regional service commission (RSC) is an administrative entity in the province of New Brunswick, Canada. As the name implies, an RSC administers services on a regional level. RSCs are not incorporated municipal entities and lack direct taxation powers. In 2023, major reforms to New Brunswick's local governance system took effect, with increased RSC responsibilities and some boundary adjustments.

== Functions ==
RSCs were originally required to provide regional planning, local planning in local service districts (LSD) and participating local governments, solid waste management, policing collaboration, emergency measures planning, and facilitating cost-sharing agreements between member governance units.

The 2023 local governance reforms added economic development, community development, tourism promotion, regional transportation, cost-sharing on recreation infrastructure, and public safety committees to the mandates of RSCs.

== History ==
Before the creation of RSCs, regional planning and waste management were managed by two systems of planning commissions and solid waste commissions; these sets of commissions divided the province in different ways.

=== Finn Report ===
The concept of a regional administrative body that replaced existing regional commissions in a unified body was proposed by the Finn Report in 2008 as part of a sweeping reform of the province's local governance bodies. Twelve RSCs would administer services in 53 municipalities with boundaries based on communities of interest rather than existing municipal and LSD boundaries.

The Graham government shelved the Finn Report shortly after it was released, with Graham telling reporters it would be a mistake to implement the changes during the 2008 financial crisis.

=== Creation ===
RSCs were created by the Alward government in 2012, taking effect on 1 January 2013. The initial boards consisted of mayors of the member municipalities and rural communities and LSD representatives appointed by the provincial government.

Instead of using the RSC boundaries proposed by Finn, the Alward government based RSC boundaries on existing governance units. The period between announcement and implementation allowed for municipalities and LSDs to request transfer to another RSC; Belledune, Saint-Quentin, and Hampton all took advantage of this policy to successfully lobby for a change in which RSC they would belong to.

=== 2023 changes ===
All local service districts were dissolved, with all areas not within a municipality formed rural districts. Minor boundary changes were common; Hampton was moved from the Kings RSC to Fundy.

== Board ==
Each RSC is governed by a board consisting of all mayors within the RSC and chair of the advisory board of the RSC's rural district.

== Official languages ==
The Official Languages Act (OLA) applies to all RSCs with a 20% linguistic minority, a city, or a municipality with a 20% linguistic minority. As of 2017 eight RSCs are subject to the OLA.

== List of regional service commissions ==
The twelve RSCs were originally given only numbers, counting roughly clockwise from the northwestern corner of the province; the original order is retained here. Most adopted more descriptive names within two years of their creation.

Municipality types: (C) city, (T) town, (VL) village, (RC) rural community, (RM) regional municipality

=== Northwest Regional Service Commission ===
The NWRSC serves primarily francophone communities in the northwestern corner of the province, including all of Madawaska County, western Restigouche County, and northern Victoria County.

- Edmundston (C)
- Grand Falls (T)
- Haut-Madawaska (T)
- Saint-Quentin (T)
- Vallée-des-Rivières (T)
- Northwest Rural District

=== Restigouche Regional Service Commission ===
The RRSC serves most of Restigouche County and is the smallest RSC.

- Bois-Joli (VL)
- Campbellton (C)
- Heron Bay (T)
- Kedgwick (RC)
- Restigouche Rural District

=== Chaleur Regional Service Commission ===
The CRSC serves western and central Gloucester County and the eastern edge of Restigouche County.

- Bathurst (C)
- Belle-Baie (T)
- Belledune (VL)
- Chaleur Rural District

=== Acadian Peninsula Regional Service Commission ===
Serves eastern Gloucester County and Neguac, which forms an exclave surrounded by the Greater Miramichi RSC.

- Caraquet (T)
- Hautes-Terres (T)
- Île-de-Lamèque (T)
- Neguac (VL)
- Rivière-du-Nord (T)
- Shippagan (T)
- Tracadie (RM)
- Acadian Peninsula Rural District

=== Greater Miramichi Regional Service Commission ===
Serves most of Northumberland County plus the rural community of Upper Miramichi.

- Alnwick (RC)
- Doaktown (VL)
- Miramichi River Valley (RC)
- Miramichi (C)
- Upper Miramichi (RC)
- Greater Miramichi Rural District

=== Kent Regional Service Commission ===
Serves Kent County and Rogersville Parish in Northumberland County.

- Beaurivage (T)
- Beausoleil (RC)
- Champdoré (T)
- Five Rivers (VL)
- Grand-Bouctouche (T)
- Nouvelle-Arcadie (VL)
- Kent Rural District

=== Southeast Regional Service Commission ===
Serves Westmorland and Albert Counties.

- Cap-Acadie (T)
- Dieppe (C)
- Fundy Albert (VL)
- Maple Hills (RC)
- Memramcook (VL)
- Moncton (C)
- Riverview (T)
- Salisbury (T)
- Shediac (T)
- Strait Shores (RC)
- Tantramar (T)
- Three Rivers (VL)
- Southeast Rural District

=== Kings Regional Service Commission ===
Serves eastern Kings County plus three LSDs in Queens County. Kept its original name until the local governance reform.

- Butternut Valley (RC)
- Sussex (T)
- Valley Waters (VL)
- Kings Rural District

=== Fundy Regional Service Commission ===
Serves Saint John County, western Kings County, and southwestern Queens County.

- Fundy-St. Martins (VL)
- Grand Bay-Westfield (T)
- Hampton (T)
- Quispamsis (T)
- Rothesay (T)
- Saint John (C)
- Fundy Rural District

=== Southwest New Brunswick Service Commission ===
Serves most of Charlotte County plus Manners Sutton and McAdam Parishes in York County.

- Campobello Island (RC)
- Eastern Charlotte (RC)
- Fundy Shores (RC)
- Grand Manan (VL)
- McAdam (VL)
- Saint Andrews (T)
- St. Stephen (T)
- Southwest Rural District

=== Capital Region Service Commission ===
Serves Sunbury County, most of York County, most of Queens County, and Clarendon Parish in Charlotte County. Kept its original name until shortly before the local governance reform.

- Arcadia (VL)
- Central York (RC)
- Fredericton (C)
- Fredericton Junction (VL)
- Grand Lake (VL)
- Hanwell (RC)
- Harvey (RC)
- Nackawic-Millville (RC)
- Nashwaak (RC)
- New Maryland (VL)
- Oromocto (T)
- Sunbury-York South (RC)
- Tracy (VL)
- Capital Region Rural District

=== Western Valley Regional Service Commission ===
Serves Carleton County, most of Victoria County, and Canterbury and North Lake Parishes in York County.

- Carleton North (T)
- Hartland (T)
- Lakeland Ridges (VL)
- Southern Victoria (VL)
- Tobique Valley (VL)
- Woodstock (T)
- Western Valley Rural District
