= List of counties of New Brunswick =

County of New Brunswick, Canada

Counties of New Brunswick
- Location: Province of New Brunswick
- Number: 15
- Populations: 10,998 (Queens) – 163,576 (Westmorland)
- Areas: 1,461 km^{2} (Saint John) – 12,843 km^{2} (Northumberland)
- Government: County government (defunct since 1966)
- Subdivisions: Parishes (Note: Parishes are the normal subdivision. Saint John, Fredericton, and the town of Grand Falls are also included in the Territorial Division Act, all with different boundaries than the municipalities have today. Fredericton was originally a parish, while Grand Falls Parish and the town are legally separate.)

The Canadian province of New Brunswick has 15 counties, originating in the British tradition of local courts for civil and judicial administration that were officiated by the colony's appointed magistrates.

Counties, parishes and shiretowns are delineated in the Territorial Division Act. While no longer administrative divisions, they continue to define regional communities and have many legacy functions and provincial applications. They figure prominently in residents' sense of place and continue as significant threads in the province of New Brunswick's cultural fabric (i.e., most citizens always know which county they are in).

Counties are used as the basis of census divisions (Note: When municipalities extend into two counties, the entire municipality is assigned to one census division.) by Statistics Canada in the national census, while their parishes are the basis for census subdivisions.

== History ==
The push for responsible government would see the municipal system of elective local government replace the magistracy, and in 1877 it was made mandatory that the province's county courts of sessions would municipalize. (Note: Courts gained the ability to voluntarily incorporate in 1851;)

"Sweeping" reforms of the Robichaud premiership in 1966 ceased all county local government function, consequent to the government's New Brunswick Equal Opportunity program which brought about dissolution of county entities in favour of a ministerial upper tier, among other reforms local government related or otherwise.

Counties were not replaced with another form of regional local government. Instead, many small village municipalities were created, with the surrounding predominantly rural areas financing local services and facilities through local service districts until the reform of local governance in 2023.

=== Origin ===
The partitioning of Nova Scotia at the close of the American Revolutionary War was discreetly attributed by the British to the distance between the St. John river communities and the administrative centre at Halifax. The arrival of American Loyalist refugees saw the population in the colony grow abruptly, with many directed to Sunbury county's Wolastoq/Saint John river.

Initially, when Nova Scotia's authorities established counties for the first time in 1759, the vast territory of former Acadia to the north of Kings County was erected as Cumberland, until on April 30, 1765, when the county was sectioned for the residents of the townships along the coastline and in the lower Saint John River valley. The new county was called Sunbury.

It would not be until 24 May 1770 that a boundary would be established between the two counties. Sunbury's western boundary was described as starting at the head of the St. Croix River, following the north line to the Saint John River and then to the southern Canadian border. This description actually overlapped a part of Maine’s territory, as you would have needed to go far west, towards the area near the source of the Chaudière River. On the east the boundary with Cumberland ran north by the magnet from a point 20 miles up from Mispec. No further changes would be made until 1785, when the recently partitioned New Brunswick province's government established new counties.

=== Creation ===
New Brunswick was created on June 18, 1784. The province was divided into eight counties by decree of Governor Carleton: Charlotte, Kings, Northumberland, Queens, Saint John, Sunbury, Westmorland and York. In January 1786, the first session of the New Brunswick Legislative Assembly was held in Saint John, at which the MLA’s passed An Act for the better ascertaining and confirming the Boundaries of Several Counties within this Province, and for subdividing them into Towns or Parishes. As the council worked on developing the original county lines, they desperately needed maps of the province, which, at the time, they seemingly lacked. As a result, they relied on two maps by Joseph Frederick Wallet DesBarres from 1780, the best candidates for a map of New Brunswick at the time. As the new boundaries were established, the former counties of Cumberland and Sunbury were disregarded, with the exception of the starting point of the boundary between Westmorland and Northumberland counties, which shared a resemblance to the old boundaries, though this might have been a coincidence.

The county lines were strategically drawn to align with the watersheds, a logical decision given that New Brunswick's settlements were developed along waterways. Additionally, the counties were able to be divided into three groups: the Bay of Fundy, the Saint John River and the North Shore.

== List ==
County	Shire town	Established	Origin	Etymology	Population (2021)	Population (2016)	Change	Land area (km^{2})	Population density (per km^{2})	Map
Albert County	Hopewell Cape (Now part of Fundy Albert)	1845	Erected from Westmorland County	Prince Albert, husband of Queen Victoria.	30,749	29,158	+5.5%	1,806.23	17.0	
Carleton County	Woodstock	1831	Erected from York County	Thomas Carleton, the first Lieutenant Governor of New Brunswick.	26,360	26,178	+0.7%	3,309.06	8.0	
Charlotte County	Saint Andrews	1785	One of the original 8 counties.	Queen Charlotte, wife of King George III.	26,015	25,428	+2.3%	3,418.24	7.6	
Gloucester County	Bathurst	1826	Erected from Northumberland County	Princess Mary, Duchess of Gloucester, fourth daughter of King George III.	78,256	78,444	−0.2%	4,734.30	16.5	
Kent County	Richibucto (Now part of Beaurivage)	1826	Erected from Northumberland County	Prince Edward, Duke of Kent and Strathearn, father of Queen Victoria.	32,169	30,475	+5.6%	4,550.38	7.1	
Kings County	Hampton	1785	One of the original 8 counties.	To express loyalty to The Crown.	71,184	68,941	+3.3%	3,482.35	20.4	
Madawaska County	Edmundston	1873	Erected from Victoria County	The Madawaska River, derived from a Maliseet word meaning unknown.	32,603	32,741	−0.4%	3,454.97	9.4	
Northumberland County	Newcastle (Now part of Miramichi)	1785	One of the original 8 counties.	The Northumberland Strait	45,005	44,952	+0.1%	12,843.39	3.5	
Queens County	Gagetown (Now part of Arcadia)	1785	One of the original 8 counties.	To express loyalty to The Crown and after early settlers from Queens, Long Island, New York.	10,998	10,472	+5.0%	3,681.05	3.0	
Restigouche County	Dalhousie (Now part of Heron Bay)	1837	Erected from Gloucester County	The Restigouche River, derived from the Mi'kmaq name meaning five-fingered river.	30,700	30,955	−0.8%	8,566.82	3.6	
Saint John County	Saint John	1785	One of the original 8 counties.	The Saint John River.	76,558	74,020	+3.4%	1,461.05	52.4	
Sunbury County	Burton	1785 (Note: The original Sunbury County was erected by Nova Scotia in 1765 to include all of New Brunswick west of the Petitcodiac River settlements; the New Brunswick version was created by letters patent after the other seven original counties of the province.)	One of the original 8 counties.	Viscount Sunbury, the courtesy title of George Montagu-Dunk, 2nd Earl of Halifax.	27,864	27,644	+0.8%	2,692.97	10.3	
Victoria County	Andover (Now part of Southern Victoria	1850 (Note: The Act erecting Victoria County was passed in 1844 but did not receive royal assent until 1850.)	Erected from Carleton County	Queen Victoria	18,312	18,617	−1.6%	5,492.85	3.3	
Westmorland County	Dorchester (Now part of Tantramar)	1785	One of the original 8 counties.	The county of Westmorland in North West England.	163,576	149,623	+9.3%	3,659.74	44.7	
York County	Fredericton	1785	One of the original 8 counties.	Prince Frederick, Duke of York and Albany, second son of George III.	105,261	99,453	+5.8%	8,095.10	13.0	

== See also ==
- Administrative divisions of New Brunswick
- List of municipalities in New Brunswick
- List of parishes in New Brunswick
- Local government in Canada
- Local service district (New Brunswick)
- Provinces and territories of Canada
