= Saint-Léonard Parish =

Saint-Léonard
- Parish
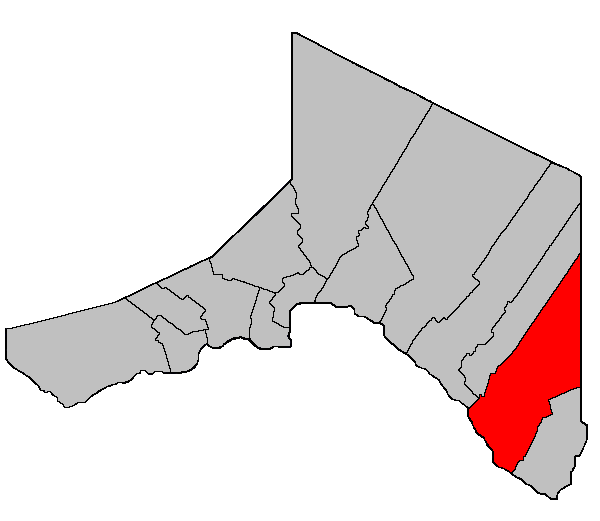
- Location within Madawaska County, New Brunswick.
- Coordinates: 47.235°N 67.8°W
- Country: Canada
- Province: New Brunswick
- County: Madawaska
- Erected: 1850

Area
  - Land: 344.85 km^{2} (133.15 sq mi)

Population (2021)
  - Total: 858
  - Density: 2.5/km^{2} (6.5/sq mi)
  - Change 2016-2021: ▼12.0%
  - Dwellings: 380
- Time zone: UTC-4 (AST)
  - Summer (DST): UTC-3 (ADT)
- Figures do not include portion within the town of Saint-Léonard

Saint-Léonard (French pronunciation: [sɛ̃ leɔnaʁ]) is a geographic parish in Madawaska County, New Brunswick, Canada. (Note: The Territorial Division Act divides the province into 152 parishes, the cities of Saint John and Fredericton, and one town of Grand Falls. The Interpretation Act clarifies that parishes include any local government within their borders.)

For governance purposes it is divided between the town of Vallée-des-Rivières and the Northwest rural district, both of which are members of the Northwest Regional Service Commission.

Before the 2023 governance reform, the parish was divided between the town of Saint-Léonard and the local service district of the parish of Saint-Léonard, part of which was included in Vallée-des-Rivières by the reform.

== Origin of name ==
The parish's name may have been in honour of Leonard R. Coombes, local magistrate.

== History ==
Saint-Léonard was erected as Saint Leonard in 1850 from Madawaska Parish. The parish was part of Victoria County and extended south of the modern county line.

In 1862 the boundary with Grand Falls Parish was altered.

In 1864 part of Saint-Léonard was included Gordon Parish.

In 1873 all of the parish south of the new Madawaska County line was added to Drummond Parish.

In 1875 the county line with Victoria was altered and part of Drummond added to Saint-Léonard.

In 1877 part of Saint-Léonard was included in the new Sainte-Anne Parish.

In 1907 the southern part of Saint-Léonard was erected as Saint-André Parish.

In 1946 Saint-Léonard was affected by the major reorganisation of Madawaska County parish boundaries.

In 1973 the legal name was changed to Saint-Léonard.

== Boundaries ==
Saint-Léonard Parish is bounded:

- on the east, beginning at a point on the Victoria County line about 13.9 kilometres south of the Restigouche County line, then running south about 21.5 kilometres along the Victoria County line to the prolongation of the northwestern line of the Coombes Road Settlement, most of which runs along Route 17 before the highway turns farther north;
- on the southeast, beginning on the county line, then running southwesterly along the above prolongation the northernmost corner of a grant to Alex. Michaud, which is about 1 kilometre northeasterly of the bend of Route 17, then southeasterly and southwesterly along the northeastern and southeastern lines of the Michaud grant to the northernmost corner of a grant to Juliens John, which is at the end of Coombes Road, then southeasterly to the easternmost corner of the John grant, then southwesterly along the rear line of grants fronting on the Coombes Road until it strikes Route 255, then generally southwesterly along the rear line of grants fronting on Saint-Amand Road in Saint-André Parish until it strikes the rear line of grants on the Saint John River, which coincides with Route 2, then northwesterly to Bourgoin Road, then southwesterly along Bourgoin Road and its prolongation to the international border within the Saint John River;
- on the southwest by the international border within the Saint John River;
- on the northwest, beginning in the Saint John River on the prolongation of the northwestern line of a grant to Aaren Cire, about 750 metres upriver of the mouth of the Grande Rivière, then running northeasterly along the Cire grant to Grande Rivière, then upriver to the northwestern line of a grant to F. X. Violette & Others, about 600 metres northwesterly of the junction of Diamond Road and Chemin de la Grande-Rivière, (Note: WP:ENG is ignored when it would result in a clumsy construction.) then southeasterly along the Violette grant, through the above junction, until it meets the corner of a triangular grant to D. Thibodeau, then easterly along the Thibodeau grant to the rear line of the Harrison Settlement, then generally northeasterly along Harrison Settlement to its end and then the rear line of grants on the southeastern side of Grande Rivière in Notre-Dame-de-Lourdes Parish to the end, then northeasterly along the prolongation of the rear line of the last eight Grande Rivière grants to the starting point.

== Communities ==
Communities at least partly within the parish. bold indicates an incorporated municipality; italics indicate a name no longer in official use

- Bellefleur
- Coombes Road
- Cyr Junction
- Grand River
- Grand-Ruisseau
- Harrison Brook Settlement
- Martin Siding
- Poitras
- Rang-des-Bourgoin
- **Saint-Léonard**
- Saint-Léonard-Parent
- Veneer
- Violette Settlement

== Bodies of water ==
Bodies of water (Note: Not including brooks, ponds or coves.) at least partly within the parish.

- Grande Rivière
- Saint John River
- Powers Creek

== Other notable places ==
Parks, historic sites, and other noteworthy places at least partly within the parish.

- Saint-Léonard Aerodrome

== Demographics ==
Parish population total does not include town of Saint-Léonard

=== Population ===
**Population trend**

Census	Population	Change (%)
2016	975	▼7.3%
2011	1,052	▲1.3%
2006	1,039	▼2.0%
2001	1,060	▼5.5%
1996	1,122	▲14.8%
1991	977	N/A

=== Language ===
**Mother tongue (2016)**

Language	Population	Pct (%)
French only	865	90.1%
English only	75	7.8%
Both English and French	20	2.1%
Other languages	0	0%

== See also ==
- List of parishes in New Brunswick
