= Saint-André Parish =

Saint-André
- Parish
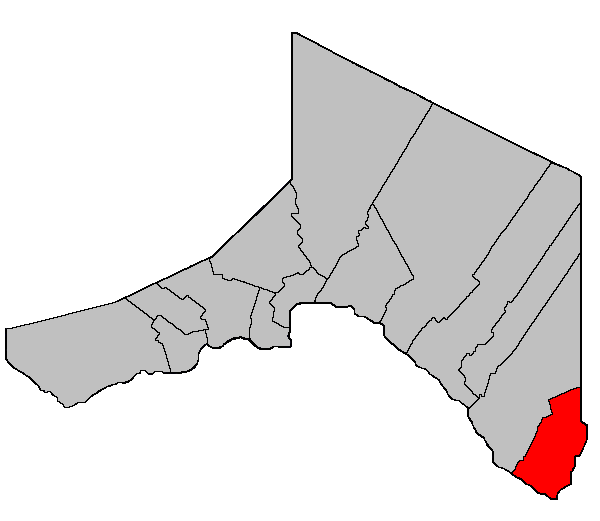
- Location within Madawaska County, New Brunswick.
- Coordinates: 47.14361°N 67.755°W
- Country: Canada
- Province: New Brunswick
- County: Madawaska
- Erected: 1907

Area
  - Land: 136.19 km^{2} (52.58 sq mi)

Population (2021)
  - Total: 1,794
  - Density: 13.2/km^{2} (34/sq mi)
  - Change 2016-2021: ▼5.6%
  - Dwellings: 782
- Time zone: UTC-4 (AST)
  - Summer (DST): UTC-3 (ADT)
- Figures do not include portion within the town of Grand Falls; Figures are for rural community of Saint-André; population change reflects revised figure combining 2016 parish and rural community CSDs

Saint-André (French pronunciation: [sɛ̃t‿ɑ̃dʁe]) is a geographic parish in Madawaska County, New Brunswick, Canada. (Note: The Territorial Division Act divides the province into 152 parishes, the cities of Saint John and Fredericton, and one town of Grand Falls. The Interpretation Act clarifies that parishes include any local government within their borders.)

For governance purposes it is entirely within the town of Grand Falls, which is a member of the Northwest rural district.

Before the 2023 governance reform, a small area along the Saint John River was part of the town of Grand Falls, with the remainder forming the incorporated rural community of Saint-André, itself formed in 2006 by the merger of the village of St. André and the local service district of the parish of Saint-André.

== Origin of name ==
The parish takes its name from the Roman Catholic ecclesiastical parish.

== History ==
Saint-André was erected from Saint-Léonard Parish in 1907.

== Boundaries ==
Saint-André Parish is bounded:

- on the east, beginning at a point on the Victoria County line about 35.4 kilometres south of the Restigouche County line, then running generally southerly along the Victoria County line to the Saint John River, about 75 metres west of the mouth of Little River;
- on the south by the Saint John River, running upriver along first the Victoria County line and then the international border;
- on the northwest, beginning in the Saint John on the prolongation of Bourgoin Road, then running along the prolongation and Bourgoin Road to the rear line of grants along the Saint John, which coincides with Route 2 in this area, then southeasterly along Route 2 about 650 metres to the rear line of the tier of grants along Bourgoin Road in Saint-Léonard Parish, then generally northeasterly along the rear line of the Bourgoin Road grants to the end of the tier and then along its prolongation to Route 255, then northeasterly and northwesterly along the rear line and northeastern line of the southeastern tier of the Coombes Road Settlement in Saint-Léonard Parish, then northeasterly and northwesterly along the southeastern and northeastern lines of the northwestern tier of Coombes Road Settlement to its northernmost corner, about 1 kilometre northeast of the bend of Route 17, then northeasterly along the prolongation of the northwestern line of the northwestern tier to the starting point.

== Communities ==
Communities at least partly within the parish;

- Comeau Ridge
- Levesque Settlement
- Martin Siding
- McManus Siding
- Poitras Siding

- Powers Creek
- Saint-Amand
- Saint-André
- Woodville

== Bodies of water ==
Bodies of water (Note: Not including brooks, ponds or coves.) at least partly in the parish:

- Little River
- Saint John River
- Powers Creek
- Castonguay Lake

== Demographics ==
Parish population total does not include Grand Falls or the former incorporated village of St. André (Note: The rural community CSD is actually the former incorporated village of St. André, which was relabelled the rural community CSD after the merger.)

=== Population ===
Population trend

Census	Population	Change (%)
2016	1,129	▼0.4%
2011	1,134	▼5.2%
2006	1,196 (adjusted)	
2006	1,660	▼6.2%
2001	1,769	▼7.0%
1996	1,902	▼0.2%
1991	1,905	N/A

=== Language ===
Mother tongue (2016)

Language	Population	Pct (%)
French only	1,000	93.0%
English only	70	6.5%
Other languages	0	0.0%
Both English and French	5	0.5%

== See also ==
- List of parishes in New Brunswick
