= Vallée-des-Rivières =

Town in New Brunswick, Canada

- Town
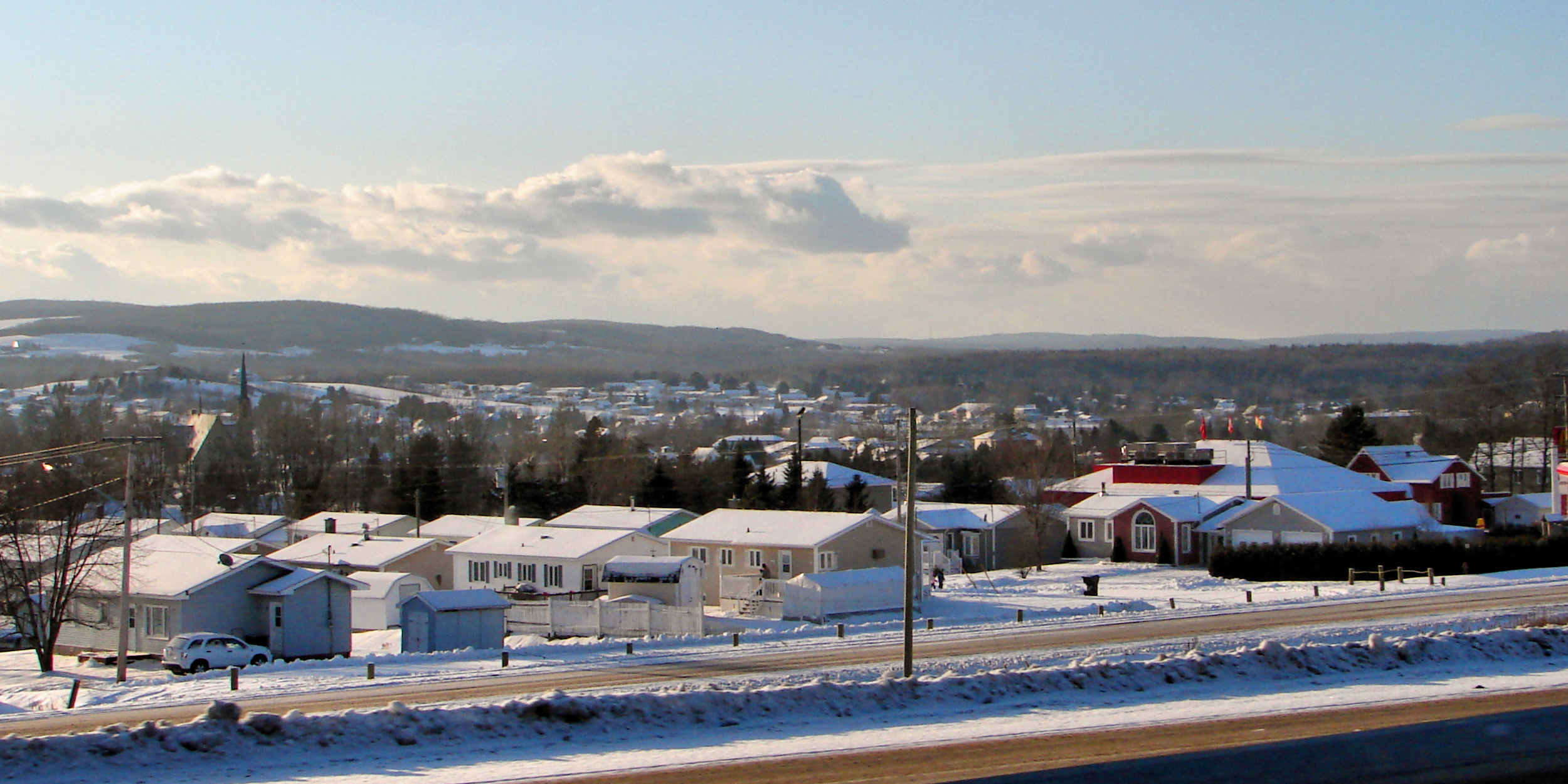

- Location within New Brunswick
- Coordinates: 47°09′45″N 67°55′30″W
- Country: Canada
- Province: New Brunswick
- County: Madawaska
- Regional service commission: Northwest
- Incorporated: January 1, 2023
- Electoral Districts Federal: Madawaska—Restigouche
- Provincial: Restigouche-La-Vallée

Government
  - Mayor: Lise Anne Roussel
- Elevation: 150 to 171 m (492 to 561 ft)
- Time zone: UTC-4 (AST)
  - Summer (DST): UTC-3 (ADT)
- Postal code(s): E7E
- Area code: 506
- Access Routes: Route 2 (TCH); Route 7 Route 144

Vallée-des-Rivières (French pronunciation: [vale de ʁivjɛʁ], lit. 'Valley of the Rivers') is a town in the Canadian province of New Brunswick. It was formed through the 2023 New Brunswick local governance reforms.

== History ==
Vallée-des-Rivières was incorporated on January 1, 2023 via the amalgamation of the former town of Saint-Léonard and the former village of Sainte-Anne-de Madawaska as well as the concurrent annexation of adjacent unincorporated areas. The adjacent unincorporated areas included portions of the former local service districts of Notre-Dame-de-Lourdes, Poitier, DSL Ste-Anne, DSL St-Léonard, Sainte-Anne and Saint-Léonard.

== Geography ==
It is located 30 km south east of Edmundston on the east bank of the Saint John River opposite Van Buren, Maine, to which it is connected via the Saint Leonard–Van Buren Bridge.

=== Climate ===
The town has a warm-summer humid continental climate (Köppen: Dfb), even for this type of climate the warm season can be milder for a non-coastal city like Saint John, because the Great Lakes and Appalachians hold much of the heat. that come from the Gulf of Mexico and the interior of the United States. But winters are substantially cold with spring and fall with pleasant temperatures.

Climate data for Vallée-des-Rivières, New Brunswick (Saint-Léonard Aerodrome), elevation: 241 m or 791 ft, 1981-2010 normals, extremes 1985-present
Month	Jan	Feb	Mar	Apr	May	Jun	Jul	Aug	Sep	Oct	Nov	Dec	Year
Record high humidex	12.2	13.0	16.8	29.1	33.8	41.3	42.3	41.9	38.6	30.6	21.9	13.4	42.3
Record high °C (°F)	11.7 (53.1)	14.4 (57.9)	17.7 (63.9)	28.1 (82.6)	34.6 (94.3)	34.0 (93.2)	34.2 (93.6)	34.6 (94.3)	33.4 (92.1)	26.7 (80.1)	18.7 (65.7)	13.17 (55.71)	34.6 (94.3)
Mean daily maximum °C (°F)	−7.1 (19.2)	−5.5 (22.1)	0.7 (33.3)	8.1 (46.6)	16.6 (61.9)	21.6 (70.9)	24.0 (75.2)	23.1 (73.6)	18.0 (64.4)	10.3 (50.5)	3.0 (37.4)	−3.9 (25.0)	9.1 (48.3)
Daily mean °C (°F)	−12.6 (9.3)	−11.3 (11.7)	−4.9 (23.2)	2.9 (37.2)	10.0 (50.0)	15.1 (59.2)	18.0 (64.4)	16.8 (62.2)	12.0 (53.6)	5.4 (41.7)	−1.2 (29.8)	−8.6 (16.5)	3.5 (38.2)
Mean daily minimum °C (°F)	−18.1 (−0.6)	−17.0 (1.4)	−10.4 (13.3)	−2.5 (27.5)	3.4 (38.1)	8.6 (47.5)	11.9 (53.4)	10.4 (50.7)	5.8 (42.4)	0.4 (32.7)	−5.3 (22.5)	−13.2 (8.2)	−2.2 (28.1)
Record low °C (°F)	−38.8 (−37.8)	−33.4 (−28.1)	−33.6 (−28.5)	−19.3 (−2.7)	−5.6 (21.9)	−2.6 (27.3)	2.7 (36.9)	−0.2 (31.6)	−6.3 (20.7)	−9.6 (14.7)	−23.2 (−9.8)	−33.9 (−29.0)	−38.8 (−37.8)
Record low wind chill	−46	−43	−42	−30	−11	−4	0	0	−8	−13	−28	−42	−46
Average precipitation mm (inches)	91.5 (3.60)	67.5 (2.66)	77.5 (3.05)	77.1 (3.04)	87.4 (3.44)	98.2 (3.87)	119.3 (4.70)	101.4 (3.99)	94.9 (3.74)	100.4 (3.95)	98.3 (3.87)	90.5 (3.56)	1,104 (43.47)
Average rainfall mm (inches)	24.3 (0.96)	9.4 (0.37)	20.9 (0.82)	50.2 (1.98)	84.7 (3.33)	98.2 (3.87)	119.3 (4.70)	101.4 (3.99)	94.9 (3.74)	92.4 (3.64)	65.0 (2.56)	31.5 (1.24)	792.2 (31.2)
Average snowfall cm (inches)	78.2 (30.8)	64.4 (25.4)	59.6 (23.5)	26.0 (10.2)	2.2 (0.9)	0.0 (0.0)	0.0 (0.0)	0.0 (0.0)	0.0 (0.0)	6.7 (2.6)	32.3 (12.7)	65.5 (25.8)	334.9 (131.9)
Average precipitation days (≥ 0.2 mm)	16.1	12.5	13.0	13.9	15.0	14.7	15.9	13.9	13.2	15.2	14.8	15.3	173.5
Average rainy days (≥ 0.2 mm)	3.3	1.8	4.6	9.5	14.7	14.7	15.9	13.9	13.2	14.1	8.6	4.3	118.6
Average snowy days (≥ 0.2 cm)	15.3	12.1	10.7	6.3	0.85	0	0	0	0.04	2.1	8.4	13.9	69.69
Average relative humidity (%)	74.7	71.3	67.8	57.7	50.2	55.4	59.8	58.7	60.6	64.3	75.6	77.8	64.5
Source: Environment Canada

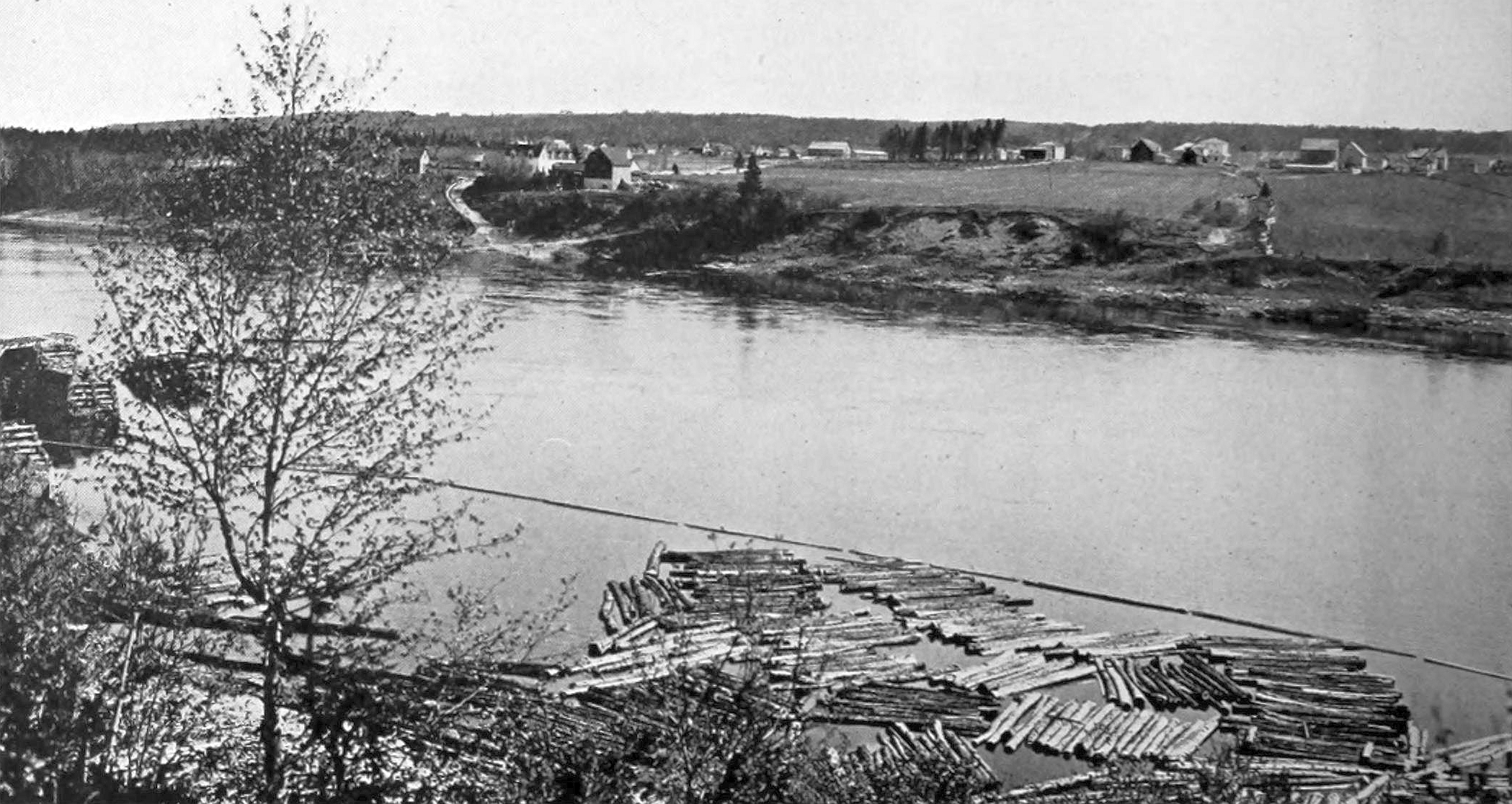
Vallée-des-Rivières, 1918

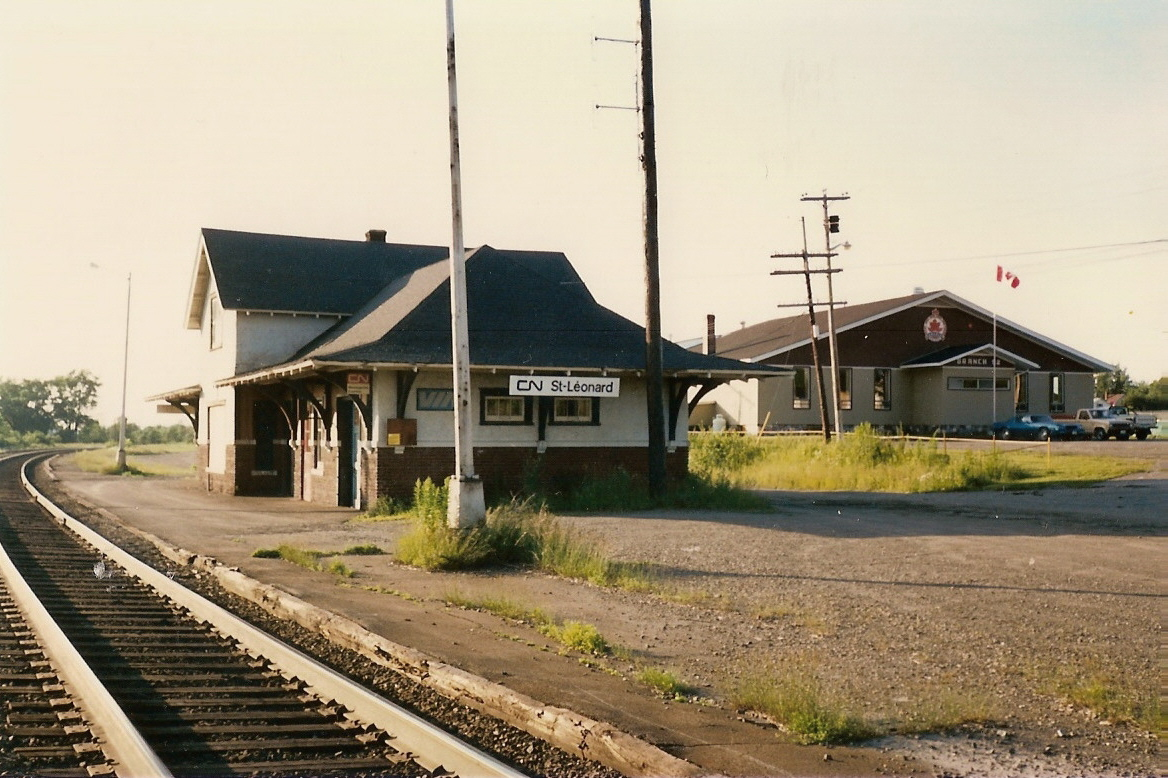
St-Léonard railroad station

== Government ==
The community's first municipal election was held in November 2022 as part of the 2022 New Brunswick municipal elections, with Saint-Léonard mayor Lise Anne Roussel elected as the new mayor.

== Attractions ==
Vallée-des-Rivières's Roman Catholic Church

Vallée-des-Rivières is known for its historical Catholic Church. Located on Principale Street, the village's place of worship was built in 1923, featuring St. Anne on the top of the establishment. Its location is based in the middle of the village on its highest promontory, reflecting the importance of the Roman Catholic religion in the parish.

The Sainte-Anne-de-Madawaska Church's architectural significance is what gives it local heritage value. It was constructed in the Romanesque style in 1923, which is mostly demonstrated by the beautiful Roman arches on both the outside and interior. The church, which is made of local granite, features a Latin cross layout and has a broad central nave and narrow transepts.

The church is very well known for the array of artworks that are connected to it. Edgar St-Pierre forged two enormous iron crosses that stand 16 feet tall, which stand above each of the two steeples. The main façade's roof was decorated with a large statue of St. Anne in 1947. Mario Mauro (1920-1985), a painter, created the frescoes of St. Anne and Notre-Dame-de-Lourdes in 1960.

== Education ==
It has several schools, École Grande-Rivière, École régionale Sainte-Anne.

== See also ==
- List of communities in New Brunswick
- List of municipalities in New Brunswick
