= Sainte-Anne-de-Madawaska, New Brunswick =

Sainte-Anne-de-Madawaska
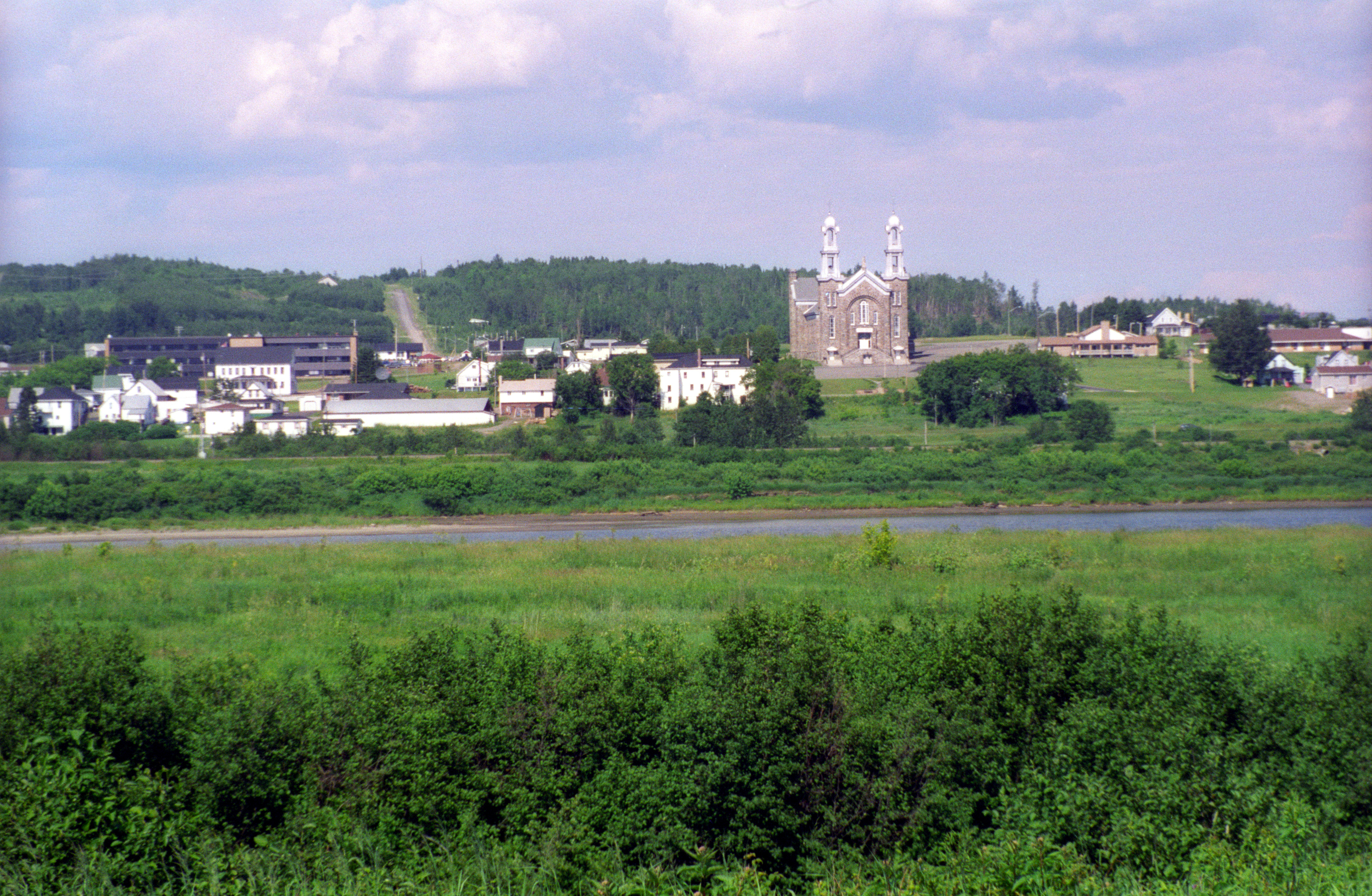

- Location of Sainte-Anne-de-Madawaska, New Brunswick
- Coordinates: 47.25°N 68.025°W
- Country: Canada
- Province: New Brunswick
- County: Madawaska
- Parish: Sainte-Anne
- Town: Vallée-des-Rivières
- Village Status: 1966
- Electoral Districts Federal: Madawaska—Restigouche
- Provincial: Restigouche-La-Vallée

Area
  - Total: 8.97 km^{2} (3.46 sq mi)

Population (2021)
  - Total: 891
  - Density: 104.1/km^{2} (270/sq mi)
  - Change 2016–21: ▼6.9%
- Time zone: UTC-4 (AST)
  - Summer (DST): UTC-3 (ADT)
- Area code: 506
- Dwellings: 436
- Median Income*: $49,792 CDN
- Access Routes: Route 2 (TCH); Route 144
- Median household income, 2015 (all households)

Sainte-Anne-de-Madawaska is a former village in Madawaska County, New Brunswick, Canada. It held village status prior to 2023 and is now part of the town of Vallée-des-Rivières.

Sainte-Anne-de-Madawaska is located on the Saint John River, 30 kilometres southeast of Edmundston.

Forestry is the major industry in the area.

== History ==
On 1 January 2023, Sainte-Anne-de-Madawaska amalgamated with the town of Saint-Léonard and parts of four local service districts to form the new town of Vallée-des-Rivières. The community's name remains in official use.

== Geography ==
Sainte-Anne-De-Madawaska is made up of several smaller communities including:

- Fourche-à-Clark
- Prime
- Quisibis
- Rang-des-Deschêne
- Siegas
- Siegas Lake Settlement
- Sirois

== Demographics ==
In the 2021 Census of Population conducted by Statistics Canada, Sainte-Anne-de-Madawaska had a population of 891 living in 415 of its 436 total private dwellings, a change of −6.9% from its 2016 population of 957. With a land area of 8.97 km^{2} (3.46 sq mi), it had a population density of 99.3/km^{2} (257.3/sq mi) in 2021.

Population trend

Census	Population	Change (%)
2016	957	▼4.5%
2011	1,002	▼6.1%
2006	1,073	▼8.1%
2001	1,168	▼8.2%
1996	1,273	▼5.1%
1991	1,341	N/A

Mother tongue (2016)

Language	Population	Pct (%)
French only	860	95.0%
English only	30	3.3%
Other languages	5	0.6%
Both English and French	10	1.1%

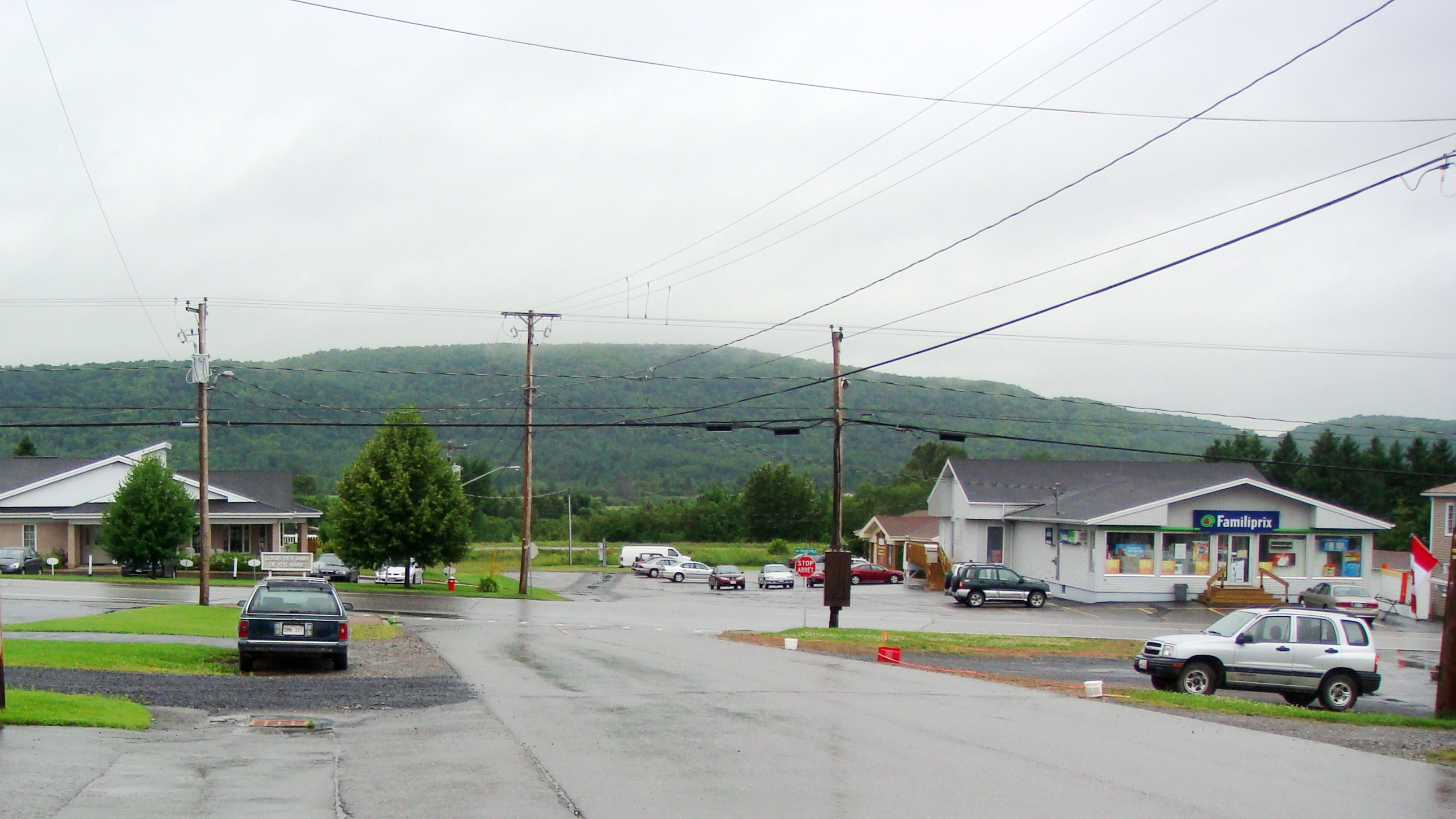
Saint Andre Street in Ste-Anne-de-Madawaska

== Attractions ==
Sainte-Anne-de-Madawaska's Roman Catholic Church

Sainte-Anne-de-Madawaska is known for its historical Catholic Church. Located on Principale Street, the village's place of worship was built in 1923, featuring St. Anne on the top of the establishment. Its location is based in the middle of the village on its highest promontory, reflecting the importance of the Roman Catholic religion in the parish.

The Sainte-Anne-de-Madawaska Church's architectural significance is what gives it local heritage value. It was constructed in the Romanesque style in 1923, which is mostly demonstrated by the beautiful Roman arches on both the outside and interior. The church, which is made of local granite, features a Latin cross layout and has a broad central nave and narrow transepts.

The church is very well known for the array of artworks that are connected to it. Edgar St-Pierre forged two enormous iron crosses that stand 16 feet tall, which stand above each of the two steeples. The main façade's roof was decorated with a large statue of St. Anne in 1947. Mario Mauro (1920–1985), a painter, created the frescoes of St. Anne and Notre-Dame-de-Lourdes in 1960.

== See also ==
- List of communities in New Brunswick
