= New Brunswick Route 14 =

There have been two highways in New Brunswick numbered Route 14:

- New Brunswick Route 14 (1927-1965), now Route 114
- New Brunswick Route 14 (1965-1984), now Route 144
