= New Brunswick Route 2 =

Highway in New Brunswick

Route 2
- Route Transcanadienne
- Trans-Canada Highway; Highway of Heroes
- Route 2 highlighted in red.

Route information
- Maintained by New Brunswick Department of Transportation
- Length: 515 km (320 mi)
- Existed: 1927–present

Major junctions
- West end: A-85 (TCH) near Degelis, QC
- Route 17 in Saint-Léonard; Route 95 near Woodstock; Route 3 towards Fredericton; Route 8 near Fredericton; Route 7 near Fredericton; Route 10 towards Moncton; Route 1 near Three Rivers; Route 11 / Route 15 near Moncton; Route 16 (TCH) towards Aulac
- East end: Hwy 104 (TCH) towards Amherst, Nova Scotia

Location
- Country: Canada
- Province: New Brunswick

Highway system
- Trans-Canada Highway; Provincial highways in New Brunswick; Former routes
← Route 1	→ Route 3

Route 2 is a major provincial highway in the Canadian province of New Brunswick, carrying the main route of the Trans-Canada Highway in the province. The highway connects with Autoroute 85 at the Quebec–New Brunswick border near Edmundston, Highway 104 at the border with Nova Scotia, as well as with traffic from Interstate 95 in the U.S. state of Maine via the short Route 95 connector. A core route in the National Highway System, Route 2 is a four-lane divided highway along its entire length, and passes by the cities of Edmundston, Fredericton, and Moncton.

A 20-year project to replace the original 1960s-era two-lane sections of the Trans-Canada Highway with a four-lane divided highway was officially completed on November 1, 2007. The final upgrade to Route 2 and Route 95 extended the four-lane Trans-Canada Highway eastward into Nova Scotia. The four-lane divided Highway 104 extends through the Lower South River area, while further twinning of Highway 104 has continued as separate projects. Once the final phase of Autoroute 85 in Quebec is completed, Route 2 will connect with the freeway network of Central Canada without passing through the United States.

== Route description ==
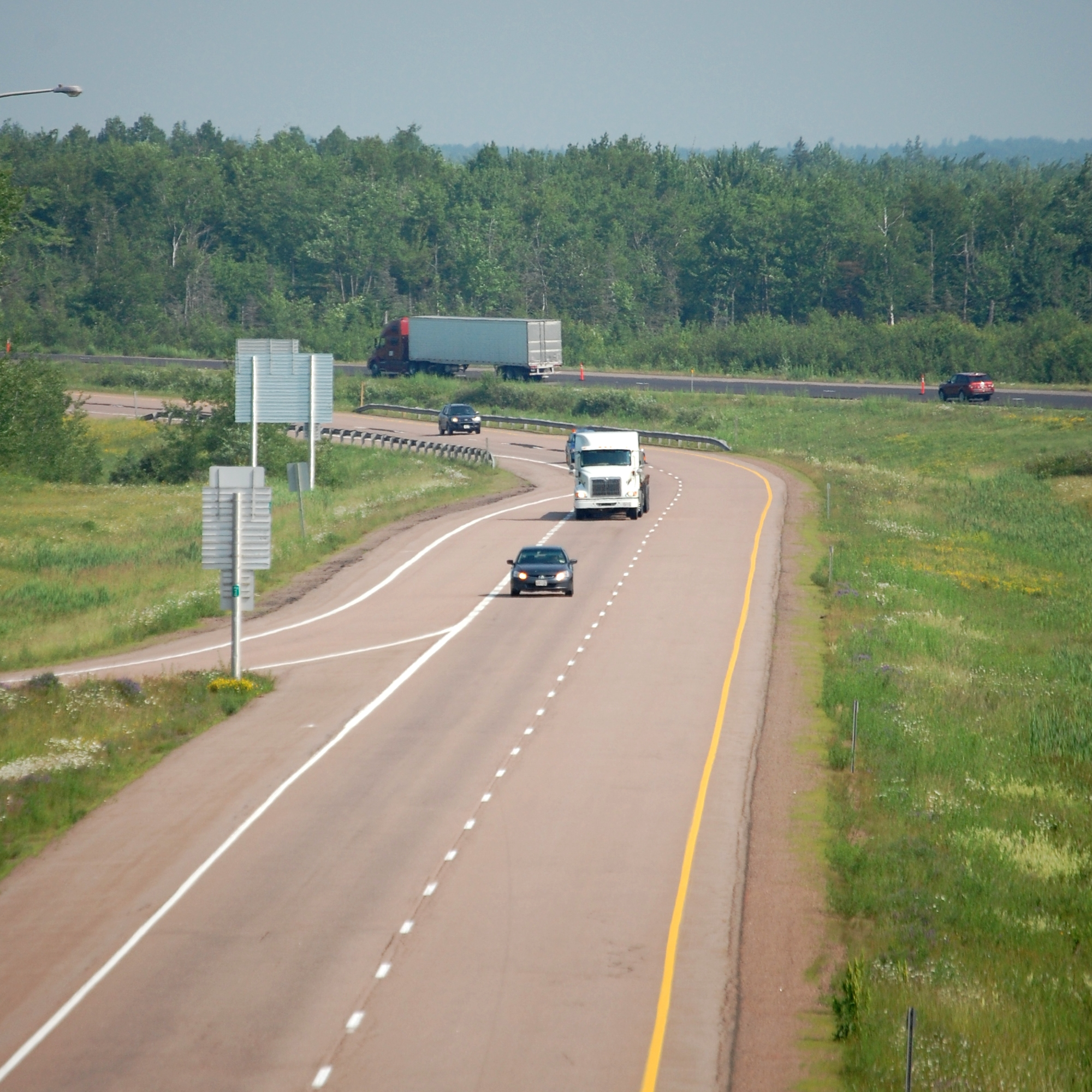
Route 2 outside Moncton, New Brunswick. Note the wide median.

As a provincial portion of the Trans-Canada, the highway's western terminus is at the interprovincial boundary with Quebec (continuing from Quebec Autoroute 85) 15 kilometres (9.3 mi) northwest of Edmundston. It follows the lower section of the Madawaska River valley and enters the Saint John River valley where it passes north of Edmundston, running several kilometres inland from the east bank of the Saint John River, crossing the Rivière Verte as it continues past Saint-Léonard.

At Grand Falls, the highway crosses to the west bank of the river and passes by Perth-Andover, Florenceville, and Hartland. At Woodstock, the Saint John River turns east and the highway continues to parallel the river on a ridge several kilometres inland along the western bank. It passes south of New Brunswick's capital, Fredericton, and Oromocto before crossing the northeastern edge of CFB Gagetown.

The Saint John River turns south near Jemseg where the highway crosses the river on the Saint John River High Level Crossing and continues east over the Jemseg River using the Jemseg River Bridge.

The highway leaves the river valleys as it continues east across the rolling hills south of Grand Lake and passes by Havelock, River Glade and Salisbury.

The highway passes north and east of the province's largest city, Moncton, and Dieppe before turning south and passing by Memramcook, Sackville, and Aulac before reaching the eastern terminus of the provincial designation at the boundary with Nova Scotia at the Missaguash River, with the Trans-Canada continuing as Nova Scotia Highway 104.

== History ==
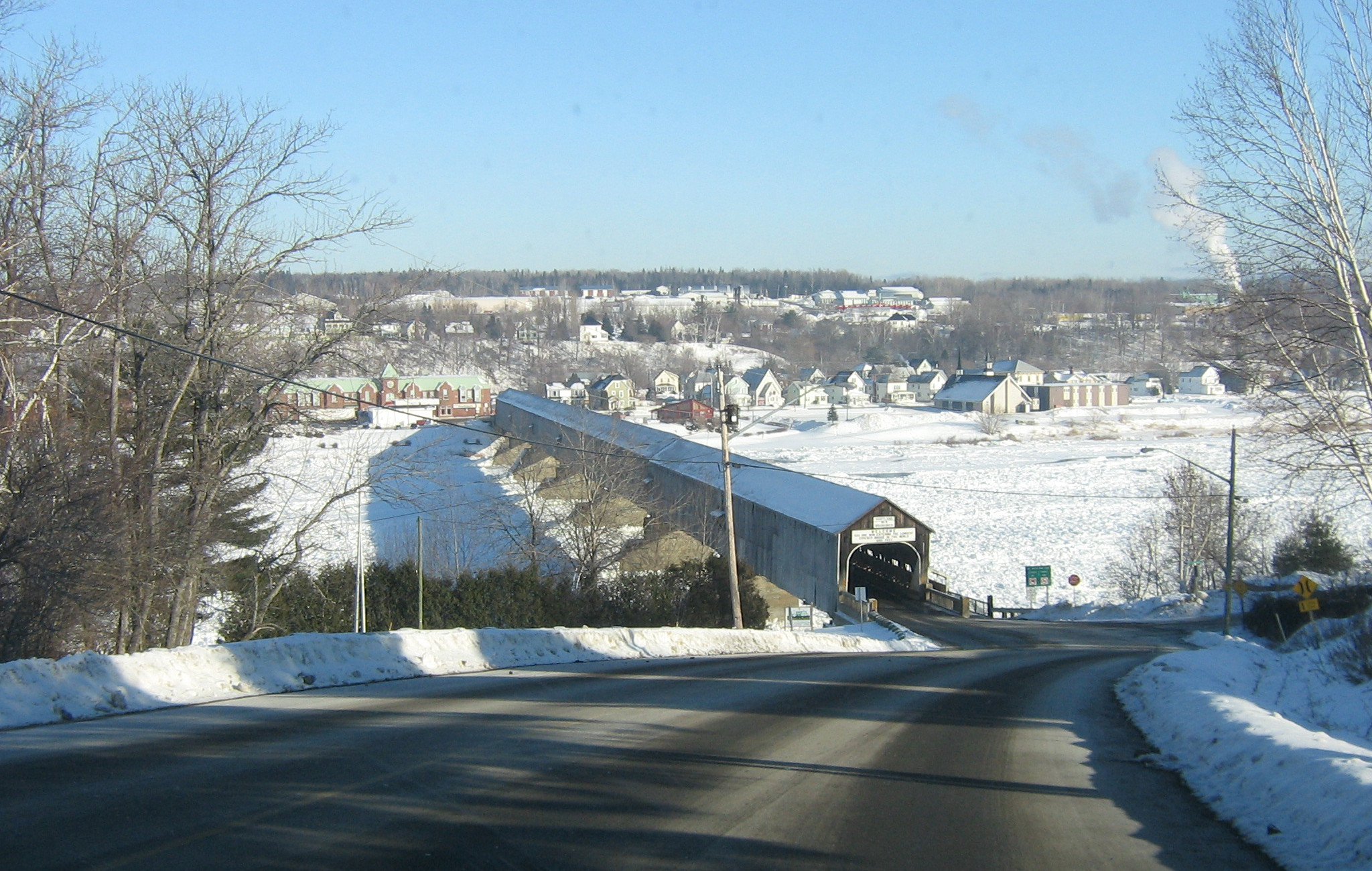
The 1901 Hartland Covered Bridge, used by Route 2 until the Hugh John Flemming Bridge opened in 1960

Route 2 was once part of an interprovincial "Highway 2" running from Windsor, Ontario to Halifax, Nova Scotia. It was one of the initial routes defined in 1927, running from Quebec as a continuation of Quebec Route 2 via Edmundston, Grand Falls, Woodstock, Fredericton, Saint John, and Moncton, After a short crossing of the New Brunswick Panhandle alongside the Madawaska River to Edmundston, Route 2 closely followed the Saint John River all the way to Saint John, crossing three times - from the east to the west at Grand Falls, back to the east at Perth-Andover, and back to the west at Hartland (on the Hartland Covered Bridge). The road on the east side of the river between Edmundston and Grand Falls had just been opened in about 1926; previously travelers had to pass through Maine (US 1, SR 165, and Boundary Road) on the west side. A Route 2A cut the distance between Fredericton and Saint John via a poorer-quality but more direct road, intersecting Route 2 at Oromocto and Westfield. Beyond Saint John, Route 2 went northeast via Sussex to Moncton, and then turned southeast to cross the Nova Scotia border near Aulac and continue as Nova Scotia Trunk 2. The original course through Aulac to the Nova Scotia border is now bypassed, with the old interprovincial bridge over the Missaguash River now demolished. The original route between Quebec and Sussex is now approximately the River Valley Scenic Drive.

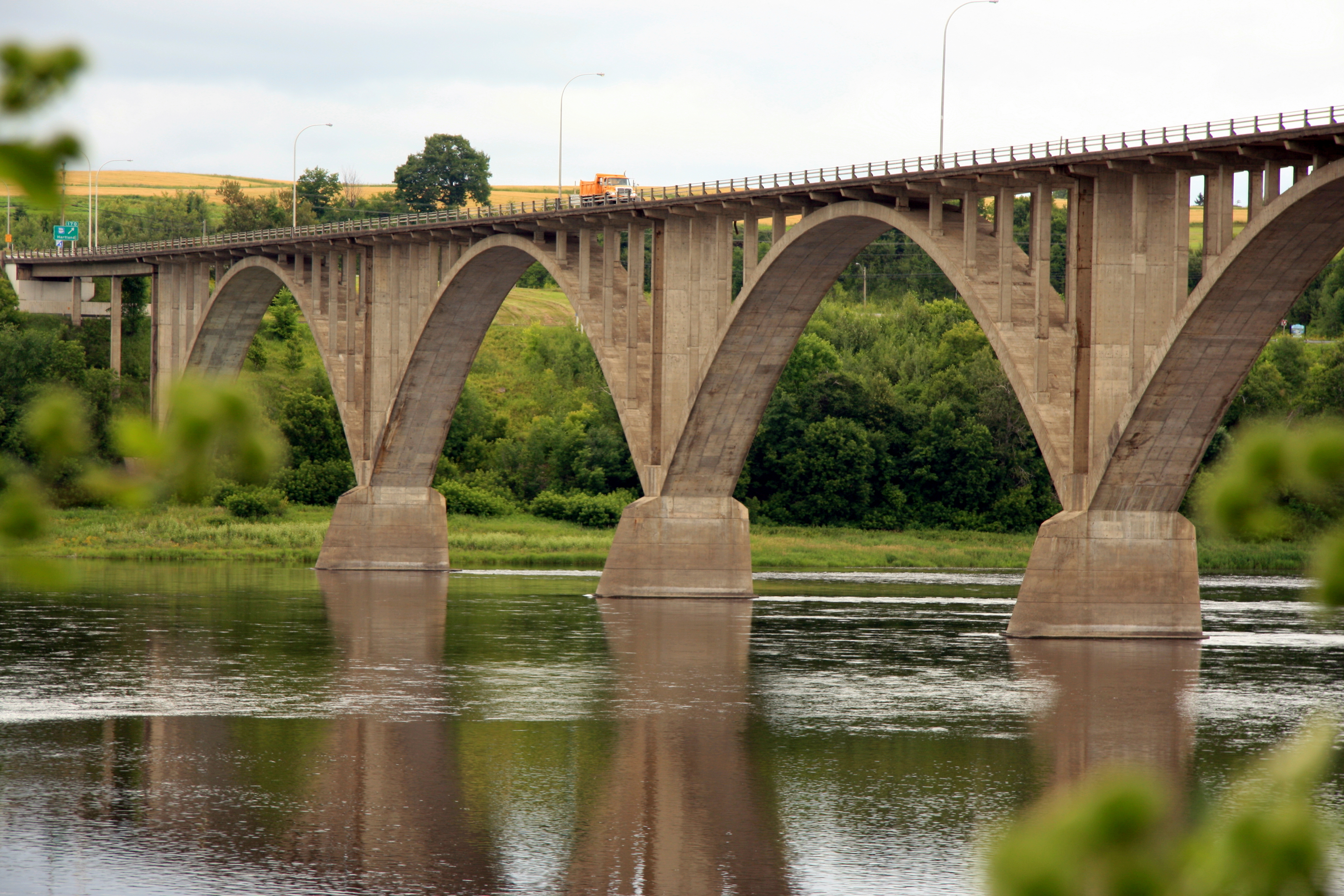
Hugh John Flemming Bridge

When the route of the Trans-Canada Highway was defined in about 1950, it did not follow Route 2 via Saint John between Fredericton and Sussex, but took the more direct Route 9. Through the late 1950s and 1960s, a number of bypasses and realignments, mostly two-lane, were built to improve Route 2 with federal Trans-Canada Highway funds. The first, built in the 1950s, was around Moncton, between southwest of Salisbury and Sackville. The old road through Moncton became Route 2A, then Route 6 in 1965, and is now Route 106.

Next was the bypass around Woodstock. The road from Route 42 (now Route 560) at Jacksonville northeast to Route 2 (now Route 103) at Somerville was Route 2B by the late 1950s; with the 1960 completion of the Hugh John Flemming Bridge, just upstream from the Hartland Covered Bridge, and the extension of Route 2B south from Jacksonville to Route 2 (now Route 165) south of Woodstock, Route 2B became a realignment of Route 2, with old Route 2 through Woodstock becoming Route 2A (renumbered Route 103 in 1965).

The initial bypass of Fredericton was also built in about 1960, including the 1959 Princess Margaret Bridge across the Saint John River, which replaced the Carleton Street Bridge for traffic to Route 8, 9, and Route 10. Traffic remaining on Route 2 to Saint John exited the bypass at what is now exit 7 for Route 7.

Route 2 was moved to be concurrent with the Trans-Canada Highway, absorbing Route 9, in the 1965 renumbering of several New Brunswick highways. The old alignment via Saint John, where it did not become Route 7 (which replaced Route 2A) or an extension of Route 1, was renumbered as the new Route 102 between Oromocto and Westfield.

The majority of road development in New Brunswick follows settlement patterns which pre-dated motor transport, thus most communities developed along navigable waterways or were served by railways. The development of controlled access expressways only began in the 1960s and only around the largest communities. The majority of early provincial highway improvements merely consisted of upgrading local roads.

Route 2 initially followed present-day Route 144 from the N.B.-Quebec interprovincial boundary to Edmundston and down the Saint John River Valley to Grand Falls. There, it crossed to the west bank of the Saint John River, and continued south to Florenceville where it crossed to the east bank to continue along present-day Route 130 to Hartland, then recrossed the river to the west bank which it followed present-day Routes 590, 165, and 102 to Fredericton in a southeast direction.

At Fredericton a controlled-access 4-lane section was built around the city, and the highway crossed the Saint John River on the Princess Margaret Bridge to the east bank just south of the central business district. Following the river's east bank just metres above its water level (frequently flooded in spring freshets), the route continued south to Jemseg where the highway turned east along the southeast shore of Grand Lake to Youngs Cove Road where the highway turned south to Coles Island and on to Sussex.

At Sussex, the highway turned east again and passed by Three Rivers and then by Salisbury. East of Salisbury, Route 2 followed local roads over a series of low hills north of Moncton, cresting at Lutes Mountain, before descending and following a controlled access section bypassing the city and Dieppe, skirting the edge of the Memramcook River valley and on to Sackville, then Aulac, and finally the N.B.-N.S. inter-provincial boundary.

=== Four-lane construction ===
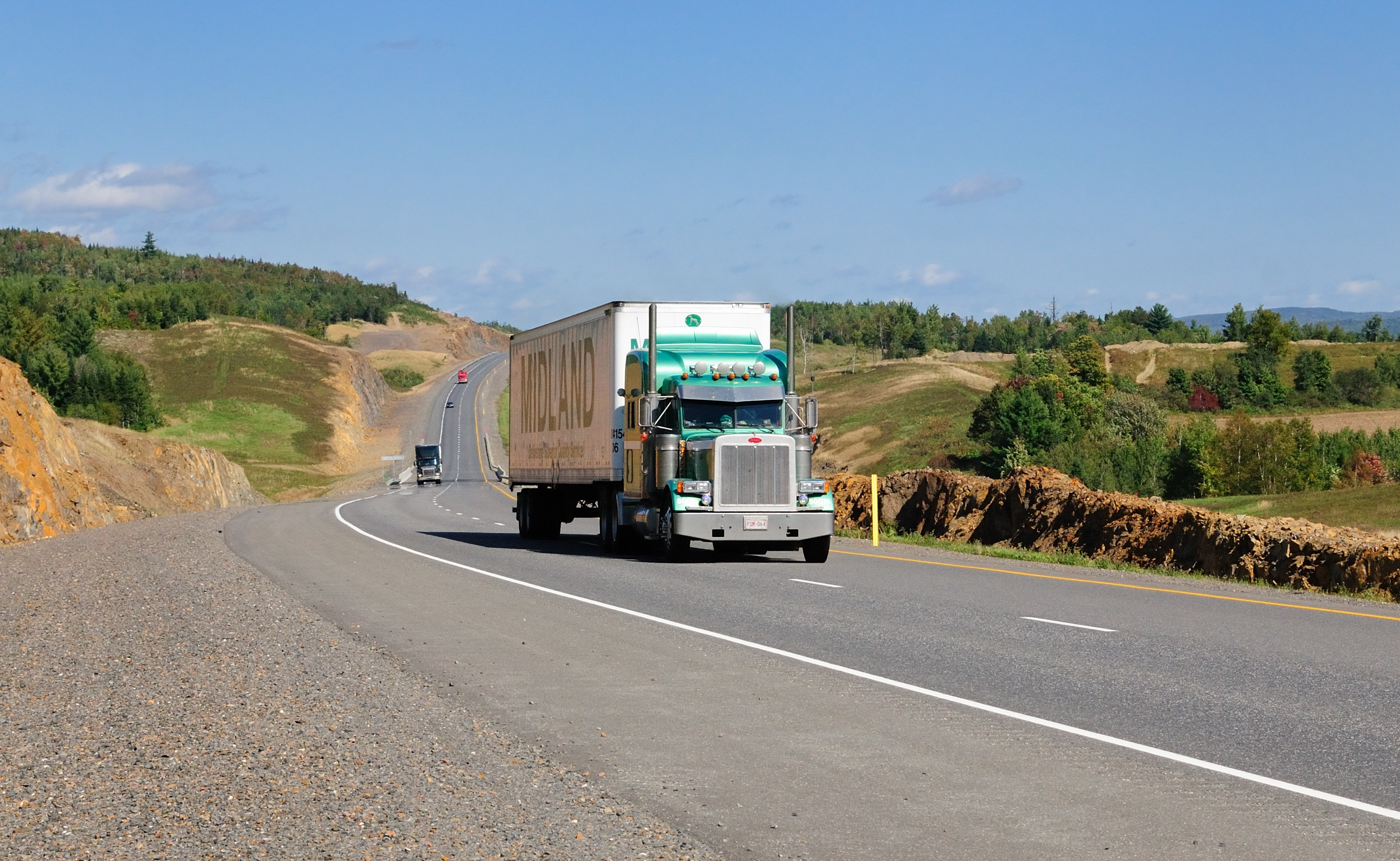
Route 2 in York County

From the early upgrades of these local roads in the 1960s under Trans-Canada Highway funding (which became designated Route 2) until the mid-1980s, very little was done to improve New Brunswick highways (aside from some re-alignment of Route 2 west of Fredericton with the flooding created by the Mactaquac Dam construction in 1968), leading to significant deterioration of the Trans-Canada Highway in New Brunswick. By the mid-1980s Route 2 was a significant traffic hazard and a major embarrassment to the province.

The provincial government changed in 1987 with the election of Premier Frank McKenna who was focused on improving the province's business climate. One of the government's major tasks was to revamp provincial transportation infrastructure and McKenna entered into aggressive negotiations with the federal government of prime minister Brian Mulroney to secure federal funding of new highway projects. McKenna viewed Route 2 (the Trans-Canada Highway) and Route 1 in New Brunswick as being partially a federal responsibility since they funnelled the majority of Atlantic Canada's highway traffic to the U.S. and central Canada. The signing of the Canada-U.S. Free Trade Agreement in 1989, coupled with federal approval for numerous railway line abandonments in the Maritimes during the 1980s, led to predictions of further highway traffic growth on New Brunswick highways in the 1990s.

Under the remainder of the McKenna administration's years of power (until 1997), Route 2 saw significant upgrading to become a 4-lane expressway on heavily-travelled portions of the highway between the N.B.-N.S. inter-provincial boundary and Penobsquis (east of Sussex). Other isolated sections were also upgraded south of Grand Lake and between Edmundston and St. Leonard, as well as at Woodstock where an interchange connected to Interstate 95.

=== Major re-alignments ===
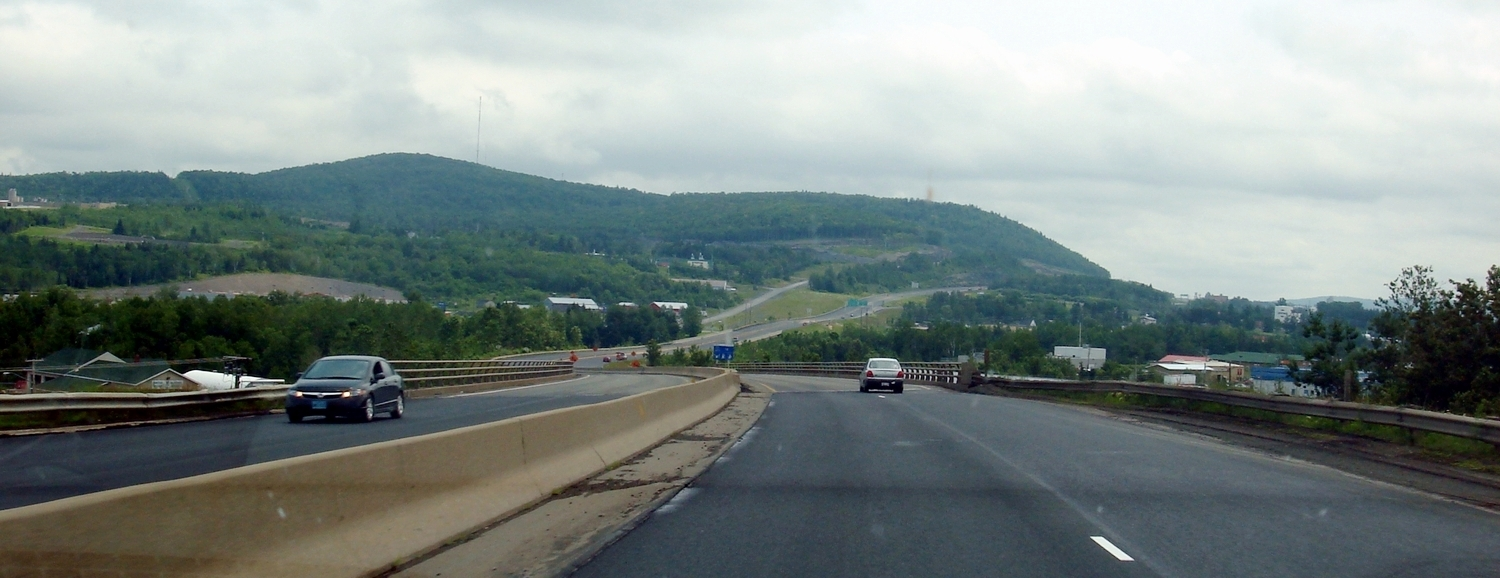
Route 2 eastbound, west of Edmundston

Despite the upgrades, the uncontrolled-access sections of Route 2 were still a significant traffic hazard. Intensive lobbying from other provincial governments in the Atlantic provinces, as well as various trucking companies and business and transportation interests, asked that Route 2 be further upgraded. Unfortunately provincial finances could not handle the relatively large price tag required, even with the federal funding at the time.

==== Fredericton–Moncton Highway ====
As a result, the final years of the McKenna administration saw a significant realignment of Route 2 proposed, running from Longs Creek, west of Fredericton, bypassing it and Oromocto to the west, and continuing southeast to Jemseg, where it would cross the Saint John River and connect with an existing four-lane section south of Grand Lake. From there the highway would again depart from its original alignment (which headed south to Sussex) and instead head due east to meet the existing Route 2 alignment at River Glade, east of Three Rivers.

225 kilometres (140 mi) of new, four-lane, controlled-access expressway would be privately financed and built, with the builder charging tolls for a 25-year period before the provincial government would gain control of the highway. In the late 1990s, an agreement was signed with a private consortium called Maritime Road Development Corporation (led by former provincial Liberal leader and former federal Minister of Transport Douglas Young) to build the new Route 2 alignment at an estimated cost of $1 billion (CAD).

The toll issue was not without controversy as it, along with several other issues, led to the downfall of McKenna's successor, Camille Thériault, in 1999 to PC leader Bernard Lord. The highway was built, but tolls were removed from most portions of the highway before they opened. This portion of the privately built realignment of the Trans-Canada Highway has a hidden toll calculated by sensors in the pavement. The toll is instead charged to the provincial government, thus motorists do not directly pay for their highway usage.

The new alignment of the Trans-Canada Highway opened in fall 2001 and at this time the portion of the old Route 2 alignment which ran between Sussex and River Glade was re-designated as part of Route 1, extending the eastern terminus of that highway approximately 40 kilometres (25 mi). The re-alignment also had the effect of shortening the total length of Route 2 in the province by approximately 40 kilometres (25 mi). Other re-designations included a 44-kilometre (27 mi) section between Youngs Cove and Sussex which became part of Route 10, a 73-kilometre (45 mi) section between Youngs Cove and Fredericton became part of Route 105, and a 10-kilometre (6.2 mi) section across the Princess Margaret Bridge and Fredericton bypass became part of Route 8.

The re-alignment and construction of Route 2 between Longs Creek and River Glade catapulted New Brunswick highways forward by decades virtually overnight. The road was designed with 150-metre (500 ft) medians, extensive wildlife fencing and underpasses, rumble strips along emergency breakdown lanes, paved emergency U-turn areas, sensors beneath the asphalt for monitoring truck weights as well as local weather and road surface conditions, extensive guard rails and reflectors, as well as two major bridges: the Saint John River High Level Crossing and the nearby Jemseg River Bridge.

With the completion of the new alignment, it was now possible to travel from Fredericton into Nova Scotia (and on to Halifax or New Glasgow) completely on a four-lane controlled access highway.

The Fredericton–Moncton section was officially opened to traffic at 10am on October 24, 2001, five weeks ahead of schedule.

==== Fredericton––Grand Falls ====
The high quality of construction of the new Route 2 alignment and improvement in the provincial highway system was not unnoticed by the new government of premier Bernard Lord. Throughout 2000–2003, several small four-lane controlled access sections on Route 2 between Fredericton and Edmundston were opened, most requiring construction of a new alignment.

During this same period, negotiations were undertaken with the federal government to secure funding to complete the last, and one of the most costly parts of the new construction—a 98-kilometre (61 mi) gap between Woodstock and Grand Falls over the Appalachian Mountains (bypassing present-day Routes 165, 103 and 130), and a 30-kilometre (19 mi) gap between Longs Creek and Pokiok (bypassing present-day Route 102), west of Fredericton.

In August, 2003 a joint announcement was made by Premier Lord and Prime Minister Jean Chrétien for a $400 million (CAD) agreement to complete upgrades to the last remaining non-controlled access section of Route 2.

The Pokiok-Longs Creek section had been independently contracted by the provincial government and opened in November 2006. However, the provincial government sought to construct the remaining 98-kilometre (61 mi) gap as part of a complete "design-build-finance-operate-maintain-rehabilitate" plan which would see large private sector consortia bid for the right to design and construct the 98 kilometres of new highway for Route 2, as well as to operate the entire 275-kilometre (171 mi) section of Route 2 between Longs Creek, where it abuts the 230-kilometre (140 mi) hidden-toll highway section built and operated by Maritime Road Development Corporation, and the Quebec–New Brunswick border as well as all of Route 95.

The winning consortium was Brun-Way Group, a joint venture by Atcon Construction and SNC-Lavalin. Brun-Way Group has two subsidiaries, Brun-Way Construction Inc., which received the ~$540 million to complete the 98 km of new construction as well as selected upgrades to other sections of Route 2 between Longs Creek and the Quebec border, and Brun-Way Highway Operations Inc., which will receive an annual payment from the government of New Brunswick until 2033 to operate and maintain this section of the highway. This agreement will place fully 85% of the maintenance of Route 2 and 100% of Route 95 in the hands of the consortia Brun-Way and MRDC.

The construction of the last segment of four-lane Route 2 was completed by Brun-Way on November 1, 2007. This construction saw a completely new alignment built north of Woodstock, staying several kilometres inland from the Saint John River's west bank, and paralleling the Canada–United States border north to Grand Falls, where it crosses to the east bank of the river and connects with existing four-lane upgrades to Route 2 through to the Quebec boundary. In addition to upgrades to Route 2, Brun-Way is also contracted to perform similar upgrades to Route 95, a short connecting route between the Trans-Canada Highway at Woodstock and the Canada U.S. border at Houlton where it meets Interstate 95.

Upon the opening of this section to traffic on November 1, 2007, the entire length of Route 2 and Route 95 are four-lane, controlled-access, divided freeways with a posted speed limit of 110 km/h (70 mph) and a design speed of up to 120 km/h (75 mph).

=== Highway of Heroes ===
On August 12, 2012, Highway 2 was officially named "Highway of Heroes" by Premier David Alward.

== Exit list ==
County	Location	km	mi	Old exit	New exit	Destinations	Notes
Madawaska		0.0	0.0	—	—	A-85 (TCH) continues towards Rivière-du-Loup	Continuation into Quebec
Madawaska		1.0	0.62		1	Madawaska Avenue	Eastbound exit and entrance; westbound access from exit on A-85
Madawaska	Edmundston	8.9	5.5	8	8	Route 144 (Principale Street) – Saint-Jacques	Western terminus of Route 144
Madawaska	Edmundston	13.3	8.3	15	13	Route 144 (Boulevard Acadie, Canada Road) – Saint-Jacques	Signed as exits 13A (west) and 13B (east)
Madawaska	Edmundston	15.0	9.3	Crosses the Madawaska River			
Madawaska	Edmundston	15.7– 16.7	9.8– 10.4		16	Carrier Street, Victoria Street	
Madawaska	Edmundston	18.3	11.4	18	18	To Route 120 / Route 161 / US 1 / Hébert Boulevard – Edmundston, Lac-Baker, Madawaska	
Madawaska	Edmundston	19.2	11.9		19	Gray Rock Road	
Madawaska	Edmundston	21.7	13.5	21	21	To Route 144 / Iroquois Road – Saint-Basile	
Madawaska	Edmundston	26.7	16.6	26	26	To Route 144 (Principale Street) – Saint-Basile	
Madawaska	Riviere-Verte	32.9	20.4	32	32	To Route 144 – Rivière-Verte	
Madawaska	Sainte-Anne-de-Madawaska	46.7	29.0	46	46	To Route 144 / Martin Road – Sainte-Anne-de-Madawaska	
Madawaska	Notre-Dame-de-Lourdes	51.1	31.8	51	51	To Route 144 – Siegas, Notre-Dame-de-Lourdes	
Madawaska	Saint-Léonard	56.8	35.3	56	56	To Route 144 / Grand-Riviere Road – Saint-Leonard	
Madawaska	Saint-Léonard	58.9	36.6	58	58	Route 17 to US 1 – Saint-Léonard, Saint-Quentin, Campbellton, Saint Leonard Airport	
Madawaska	Saint-Léonard	69.0	42.9		69	Bourgoin Road – Rang-des-Bourgoin, Martin Siding	
Victoria	Grand Falls	75.1	46.7		75	Route 108 east / Route 255 north to Route 144 – Grand Falls, Tobique Valley, Saint-André	Western terminus of Route 108, southern terminus of Route 255
Victoria	Grand Falls	77.0	47.8	75	77	Route 108 to Route 144 – Grand Falls, Saint-André	Westbound exit and eastbound entrance
Victoria	Grand Falls	77.5– 77.8	48.2– 48.3	Crosses the Saint John River			
Victoria	Grand Falls	78.7– 80.1	48.9– 49.8	78	79	To Route 218 / US 1A / Everard-Daigle Boulevard	
Victoria	Grand Falls Portage	82.4	51.2		83	Route 130 (Portage Road)	Northbound exit and entrance
Victoria	Argosy	88.0	54.7		88	Route 130 to Route 375 – Limestone, New Denmark	
Victoria		99.0	61.5		99	Route 130 – Four Falls	
Victoria	Aroostook	106.5	66.2	Crosses the Aroostook River			
Victoria	Aroostook	107.3	66.7		107	Route 130 – Aroostook, Four Falls	
Victoria	Perth-Andover	114.5– 116.0	71.1– 72.1	112	115	Route 190 / Route 109 to Route 105 – Perth-Andover, Carlingford	
Carleton	Florenceville	153.3	95.3	153	153	Route 110 – Florenceville, Centreville	
Carleton	Waterville	171.7	106.7		172	Route 130 – Hartland	Southern terminus of Route 130
Carleton	Jacksonville	183.0– 183.9	113.7– 114.3		184	Route 560 / Lockhart Mill Road – Jacksonville, Upper Woodstock	
Carleton	Woodstock	185.4	115.2	188	185	Route 550 – Woodstock, Bloomfield	
Carleton	Woodstock	187.1– 188.0	116.3– 116.8	191A	187	Route 95 west to I-95 – Houlton, Bangor	Eastern terminus of Route 95
Carleton	Woodstock	188.5	117.1	191B	188	Route 103 / Route 555 – Woodstock	Southern terminus of Route 103, eastern terminus of Route 555
Carleton	Woodstock	191.4	118.9	194	191	Beardsley Road	Durham Bridge
Carleton	Woodstock	194.0	120.5		194	Hodgdon Road – Woodstock First Nation	
Carleton	Hay Settlement	201.2	125.0		200	Route 165 (Dugan Road) – Hillman	
York	Lakeland Ridges	212.1	131.8	212	212	Route 122 / Route 165 – Lakeland Ridges	Eastern terminus of Route 122, southern terminus of Route 165
York	Lakeland Ridges	221.0– 222.8	137.3– 138.4		223	Charlie Lake Road – Temple	Westbound exit and eastbound entrance
York	Pokiok	230.6	143.3		231	Route 102 to Route 105 – Nackawic-Millville	Northern terminus of Route 102
York	Lake George	253.2	157.3	253	253	Route 635 south to Route 636 south – Lake George, Kings Landing	
York	Kingsclear	258.2	160.4	258	258	Route 3 / Route 102 – Saint Stephen, Saint Andrews, Fredericton, McAdam, Mactaquac	
York	Mazerolle Settlement	271.3	168.6	271	271	To Route 640 / Mazerolle Settlement Road – Hanwell	
York	Fredericton	280.0	174.0		280	Route 8 north – Fredericton, Miramichi	Eastbound exit and westbound entrance; southern terminus of Route 8
York	Fredericton	280.8– 281.7	174.5– 175.0		281	Route 640 (Hanwell Road)	
York	Fredericton	285.1– 286.1	177.2– 177.8	285	285	Route 101 – Fredericton, New Maryland, Fredericton Junction	Signed as exits 285A (south) and 285B (north)
Sunbury	Lincoln	291.9– 294.3	181.4– 182.9		294	Route 7 north to Route 8 – Fredericton, Miramichi, Mactaquac	Western end of concurrency with Route 7; westboound exit and eastbound entrance
Sunbury	Rusagonis-Waasis	296.5	184.2	11	297	Nevers Road – Rusagonis-Waasis, Lincoln	
Sunbury	Oromocto	300.7	186.8	15	301	To Route 102 – Fredericton Airport	Eastbound exit and westbound entrance
Sunbury	Oromocto	302.8	188.2	303	303	To Route 102 – Oromocto, CFB Gagetown, Geary, Fredericton Airport	
Sunbury	Oromocto	305.1– 306.2	189.6– 190.3		306	Route 7 south – Saint John	Eastern end of concurrency with Route 7; no westbound exit
Queens	Arcadia	329.3	204.6		330	Route 102 – Arcadia	
Queens	Arcadia	331.5– 332.5	206.0– 206.6	Saint John River High Level Crossing crosses the Saint John River			
Queens	Arcadia	332.5– 333.6	206.6– 207.3		333	Route 105 south – Sheffield	No westbound entrance, northern terminus of Route 105 (southern segment)
Queens	Jemseg	338.0	210.0	Jemseg River Bridge crosses the Jemseg River			
Queens	Jemseg	339.0	210.6	343	339	Route 695 to Route 105 north / Route 715 – Arcadia, Jemseg	
Queens	Mill Cove	347.4	215.9		347	Route 105 to Route 10 – Mill Cove, Chipman	
Queens	Youngs Cove	365.1	226.9		365	Route 10 to Route 112 – Fundy National Park, Sussex, Chipman	
Queens		372.2	231.3	Crosses the Canaan River			
Westmorland	Salisbury	413.4– 414.9	256.9– 257.8		414	Route 885 – Three Rivers, Havelock	
Westmorland	Salisbury	422.7– 424.9	262.7– 264.0		423	Route 1 – Three Rivers, Sussex, Saint John	Eastern terminus of Route 1
Westmorland	Salisbury	432.8	268.9	470	433	Route 112 to Route 106 – Salisbury	
Westmorland	Moncton	445.2– 446.1	276.6– 277.2	482	446	Route 128 – Moncton, Fundy, Riverview	
Westmorland	Moncton	450.0– 450.8	279.6– 280.1	488	450	Route 126 – Moncton, Magnetic Hill, Miramichi	
Westmorland	Moncton	452.1	280.9	490	452	Gorge Road	
Westmorland	Moncton	454.3	282.3	492	454	Mapleton Road – Mapleton	
Westmorland	Moncton	458.5– 459.6	284.9– 285.6	496	459	Route 115 (Elmwood Drive) – Champdoré, Notre-Dame	Signed as exits 459A (south) and 459B (north)
Westmorland	Moncton	462.4	287.3	500	462	Caledonia	
Westmorland	Moncton	464.8	288.8	502	465	Route 134 – Moncton, Lakeville, Westmorland County	
Westmorland	Dieppe	465.8– 467.2	289.4– 290.3	504	467	Route 11 / Route 15 – Dieppe, Moncton, Roméo LeBlanc International Airport, Shediac, Miramichi, Prince Edward Island	Signed as exits 467A (south/west) and 467B (north/east)
Westmorland	Dieppe	473.4	294.2	511	474	Route 132 – Dieppe, Roméo LeBlanc International Airport, Scoudouc	Signed as exits 474A (south) and 474B (north)
Westmorland	Memramcook	479.5	297.9	517	480	Old Shediac Road – Calhoun	
Westmorland	Memramcook	482.0	299.5	519	482	To Route 104 / Route 925 / Route 933 – Memramcook Centre, Dorchester	
Westmorland	Memramcook	486.8	302.5	524	488	Route 933 (Pont Rouge Road) to Route 104 / Route 925	Westbound exit and eastbound entrance; southern terminus of Route 933
Westmorland	Memramcook	488.1	303.3	524	488	Memramcook-Est Road	Eastbound exit and westbound entrance
Westmorland	Sackville	498.9– 500.2	310.0– 310.8	538	500	Walker Road	
Westmorland	Sackville	503.7	313.0	541	504	Route 940 (Main Street)	
Westmorland	Sackville	505.9	314.4	544	506	Route 106 (Bridge Street) – Dorchester	Eastern terminus of Route 106
Westmorland	Sackville	508.9	316.2			Coles Island Road	Unsigned; westbound exit and entrance
Westmorland		512.0– 512.9	318.1– 318.7	550	513	Route 16 (TCH) east – Aulac, Fort Beauséjour, Port Elgin, P.E.I.	Signed as exits 513A (Aulac) and 513B (Route 16)
Missaguash River		514.7	319.8	Missaguash River Bridge			
Missaguash River		514.7	319.8	—	—	Hwy 104 (TCH) east – Truro, Halifax	Continuation into Nova Scotia
1.000 mi = 1.609 km; 1.000 km = 0.621 mi: Concurrency terminus; Incomplete access; Route transition

== See also ==
- List of New Brunswick provincial highways

Trans-Canada Highway
Previous route QC Autoroute 85	Route 2	Next routes Route 16 NS Highway 104
Interprovincial Highway 2
Previous route QC Route 2	Route 2	Next route NS Trunk 2
