= Bellefleur, New Brunswick =

Coordinates: 47.112833°N 67.876389°W

Location of Bellefleur in New Brunswick

Bellefleur is a community in the Canadian province of New Brunswick. It is situated in Saint-Léonard, a parish of Madawaska County. Being on the east bank of the Saint John River, Bellefleur is less than a mile away from the United States border.

== See also ==
- List of communities in New Brunswick
