= Jemseg River Bridge =

- Coordinates: 45°49′44″N 66°06′59″W
- Carries: Route 2 (Trans-Canada Highway)
- Crosses: Jemseg River
- Locale: Jemseg, New Brunswick

Characteristics
- Total length: 976 metres (3,202 ft)
- Longest span: 140 metres (460 ft)
- No. of lanes: 4

History
- Construction end: 2001
- Opened: October 2002

Location
- Interactive map of Jemseg River Bridge

Jemseg River Bridge (1960)
- Coordinates: 45°49′38.72″N 66°6′55.32″W
- Carries: Route 2 (Trans-Canada Highway)
- Crosses: Jemseg River
- Locale: Jemseg, New Brunswick

Characteristics
- Total length: 700 metres (2,300 ft)
- No. of lanes: 2

History
- Opened: 1960
- Closed: May 2015

Location
- Interactive map of Jemseg River Bridge (1960)

The Jemseg River Bridge is the name for two different structures currently crossing the Jemseg River in Jemseg, New Brunswick, Canada.

The current Jemseg River Bridge is a 950 m (3,120 ft) haunched girder bridge which opened in October 2002 and carries the four-lane Route 2 (Trans-Canada Highway) on a much broader span with considerably less approaching grade from the west. The former Jemseg River Bridge, located approximately 100 m (330 ft) downstream from the current bridge, was constructed in 1960 and carried the two-lane Route 2; it was closed in May 2015 due to safety concerns and the end spans were dismantled in 2016. The original Jemseg River Bridge was built in 1919 as a 3 span steel truss bridge, including a swing span. When dismantled in 1965, one half of the swing span was moved on Penniac Road (the Penniac Road Bridge was rebuilt in 2018 as a modern concrete bridge). The abutments from the original 1919 Jemseg Bridge can still be found approximately under the current Jemseg River Bridge and immediately adjacent to the Jemseg River.

== See also ==
- List of bridges in Canada
