= Saint John River High Level Crossing =

- Coordinates: 45°50′07″N 66°11′09″W
- Carries: Route 2 (Trans-Canada Highway)
- Crosses: Saint John River
- Locale: Coytown, New Brunswick

Characteristics
- Total length: 1,000 metres (3,300 ft)
- Height: 60 metres (200 ft)
- Longest span: 120 metres (390 ft)
- No. of lanes: 4

History
- Construction end: 2001
- Opened: October 2002

The Saint John River High Level Crossing is a steel girder bridge crossing the Saint John River at Coytown, New Brunswick, Canada.

Completed in 2001 and opened to the public in October 2002, the bridge carries 4 lanes of the realigned Route 2 (Trans-Canada Highway). Total length is 1000 m (0.61 mile) with multiple spans resting on concrete piers. The centre span is 120 m (400 ft) with an airdraft clearance of 60 m (200 ft) for navigational traffic. It was built by the Maritime Road Development Corporation as part bg of a 230 km (140 mi) toll highway project.

== See also ==
- List of bridges in Canada
