= New Brunswick Route 144 =

Highway in New Brunswick, Canada

Route 144

Route information
- Maintained by New Brunswick Department of Transportation
- Length: 65 km (40 mi)
- Existed: 1984–present

Major junctions
- West end: Route 2 (TCH) in Saint-Jacques
- Route 120 in Edmundston; Route 2 (TCH) in Saint-Basile; Route 17 in Saint-Léonard
- East end: Route 108 in Grand Falls

Location
- Country: Canada
- Province: New Brunswick
- Major cities: Edmundston, Rivière-Verte, Sainte-Anne-de-Madawaska, Saint-Léonard, Grand Falls

Highway system
- Provincial highways in New Brunswick; Former routes
← Route 140	→ Route 145

Route 144 is a 65 km (40 mi) Canadian secondary highway in northwest New Brunswick.

The route's western terminus is Route 2 (Trans-Canada Highway) at Saint-Jacques. From there, it runs in a southeast direction, flanked by Route 2 to the north and the United States border with the state of Maine to the south. Its eastern terminus is at Route 108 in Grand Falls. Route 144 is the original alignment of Route 2.

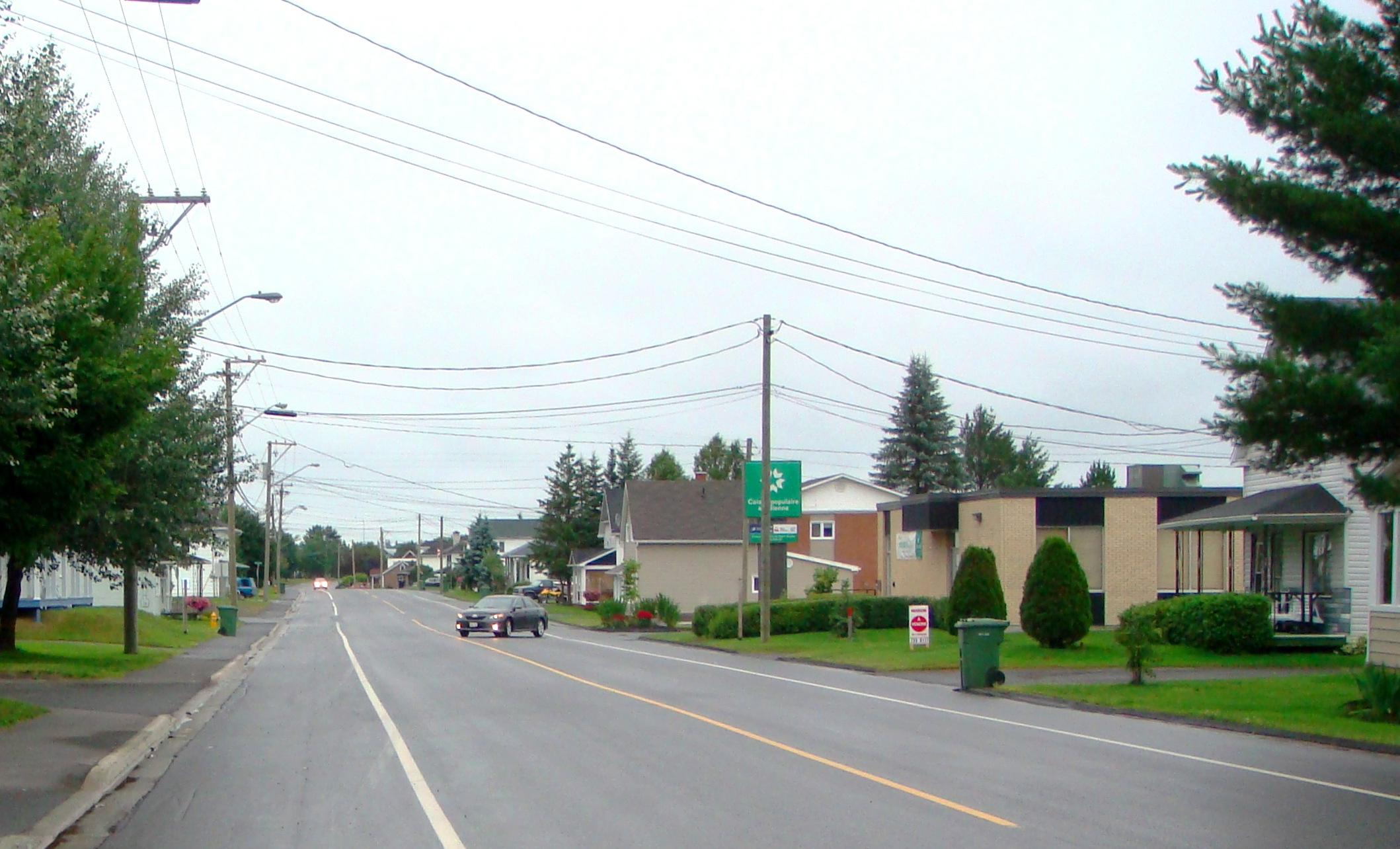
Route 144 through Saint-Basile.

== See also ==
- List of New Brunswick provincial highways
