= Notre-Dame-de-Lourdes, New Brunswick =

Coordinates: 47.251°N 67.936°W

Location of Notre-Dame-de-Lourdes in New Brunswick

Notre-Dame-de-Lourdes is a settlement in New Brunswick.

== See also ==
- List of communities in New Brunswick
