= Quisibis, New Brunswick =

Coordinates: 47.253951°N 68.041162°W

Quisbis is a community in the Canadian province of New Brunswick.

== See also ==
- List of communities in New Brunswick
