= New Brunswick Route 255 =

Highway in New Brunswick, Canada

Route 255

Route information
- Maintained by New Brunswick Department of Transportation
- Length: 19 km (12 mi)
- Existed: 1965–present

Major junctions
- South end: Route 2 (TCH) / Route 108 in Saint-André
- North end: Route 17 in Madawaska County

Location
- Country: Canada
- Province: New Brunswick
- Counties: Madawaska

Highway system
- Provincial highways in New Brunswick; Former routes
← Route 218	→ Route 260

Route 255 is a 19 km (12 mi)-long local highway in northwestern New Brunswick, Canada.

== Communities ==
- Saint-André

== See also ==
- List of New Brunswick provincial highways
