= Saint-André, New Brunswick =

Saint-André St. André
- Flag
- Motto: "Fructus ex floribus"
- Location of Saint-André, New Brunswick
- Coordinates: 47.1°N 67.76°W
- Country: Canada
- Province: New Brunswick
- County: Madawaska
- Parish: Saint-André
- Town: Grand Falls
- Founded: 1904
- Incorporated: 1967
- Electoral Districts Federal: Tobique—Mactaquac
- Provincial: Grand Falls-Drummond-Saint-André

Area
  - Total: 136.19 km^{2} (52.58 sq mi)

Population (2021)
  - Total: 1,794
  - Density: 13.2/km^{2} (34/sq mi)
  - Change 2016–21: ▼5.6%
- Time zone: UTC-4 (AST)
  - Summer (DST): UTC-3 (ADT)
- Area code: 506
- Dwellings: 341
- Median Income*: $57,472 CDN
- Website: Saint-André, NB
- Median household income, 2016 (all households)

Saint-André (French pronunciation: [sɛ̃t‿ɑ̃dʁe]) is community in Saint-André Parish, Madawaska County, New Brunswick, Canada. It was part of an eponymous rural community prior to 2023; the most recent census data is for the rural community. It is now part of the town of Grand Falls.

Situated in a potato farming area, Saint-André was founded in 1904.

== History ==
On 1 January 2023, the rural community of Saint-André amalgamated with the town of Grand Falls. The community's name remains in official use.

== Demographics ==
In the 2021 Census of Population conducted by Statistics Canada, Saint-André had a population of 1,794 living in 756 of its 782 total private dwellings, a change of −5.6% from its 2016 population of 1,901. With a land area of 136.19 km^{2} (52.58 sq mi), it had a population density of 13.2/km^{2} (34.1/sq mi) in 2021.

In the same census, the designated place portion of Saint-André had a population of 371 living in 157 of its 162 total private dwellings, a change of 6.3% from its 2016 population of 349. With a land area of 3.67 km^{2} (1.42 sq mi), it had a population density of 101.1/km^{2} (261.8/sq mi) in 2021.

Saint-André, NB Historical populations
Year	Pop.	±%
1991	424	—
1996	438	+3.3%
2001	415	−5.3%
2006	868	+109.2%
2011	819	−5.6%
2016	772	−5.7%

Mother tongue language (2016)

Language	Population	Pct (%)
French only	670	87.0%
English only	95	12.3%
Both English and French	5	0.7%

== See also ==
- List of communities in New Brunswick
