= Saint-Léonard, New Brunswick =

Saint-Léonard St. Leonard
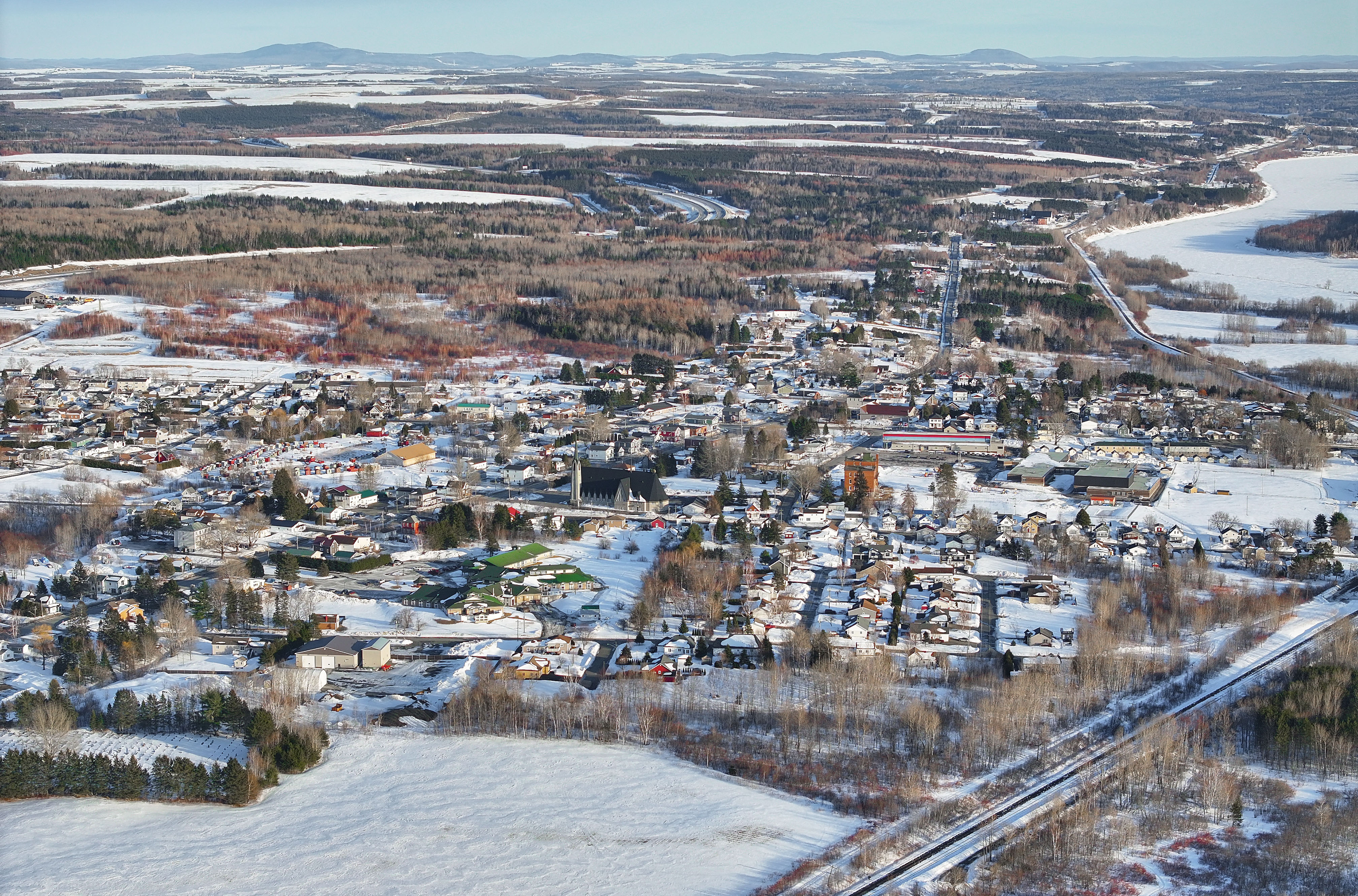

- Coat of arms

- Location of Saint-Léonard in New Brunswick
- Coordinates: 47.1625°N 67.925°W
- Country: Canada
- Province: New Brunswick
- County: Madawaska
- Parish: Saint-Léonard
- Town: Vallée-des-Rivières
- Settled: 1789
- Town Status: 1920
- Electoral Districts Federal: Madawaska—Restigouche
- Provincial: Restigouche-La-Vallée

Area
  - Land: 5.34 km^{2} (2.06 sq mi)
- Elevation: 150 to 171 m (492 to 561 ft)

Population (2021)
  - Total: 1,322
  - Density: 247.8/km^{2} (642/sq mi)
  - Change 2016–21: ▲1.7%
- Time zone: UTC-4 (AST)
  - Summer (DST): UTC-3 (ADT)
- Postal code(s): E7E
- Area code: 506: Area exchanges: 421 423
- Dwellings: 603
- Median Income*: $48,512CDN
- NTS Map: 021O04
- GNBC Code: DAADY
- Website: www.saint-leonard.ca
- Median household income, 2005 (all households)

Saint-Léonard (French pronunciation: [sɛ̃ leɔnaʁ]) is a former town in Madawaska County, New Brunswick, Canada. It held town status prior to 2023 and is now part of the town of Vallée-des-Rivières.

== History ==
Saint-Léonard was once a popular town during Prohibition in the United States as it was easy to smuggle alcohol to Van Buren.

The town's economy is driven by potato farming and a J.D. Irving Limited sawmill. Saint-Léonard is officially bilingual but it is predominantly a Francophone community.

On June 30, 2008, a truck carrying 12 million bees overturned near Saint-Léonard. This accident was the first of its kind in New Brunswick.

On 1 January 2023, Saint-Léonard amalgamated with the village of Sainte-Anne-de-Madawaska and parts of four local service districts to form the new town of Vallée-des-Rivières. The community's name remains in official use.

== Geography ==
It is located on the east bank of the Saint John River opposite Van Buren, Maine, to which it is connected via the Saint Leonard–Van Buren Bridge.

=== Climate ===
The town has a warm-summer humid continental climate (Köppen: Dfb), even for this type of climate the warm season can be milder for a non-coastal city like Saint John, because the Great Lakes and Appalachians hold much of the heat. that come from the Gulf of Mexico and the interior of the United States. But winters are substantially cold with spring and fall with pleasant temperatures.

Climate data for Saint-Léonard (Saint-Léonard Aerodrome), elevation: 241 m or 791 ft, 1981-2010 normals, extremes 1985-present
Month	Jan	Feb	Mar	Apr	May	Jun	Jul	Aug	Sep	Oct	Nov	Dec	Year
Record high humidex	12.2	13.0	16.8	29.1	33.8	41.3	42.3	41.9	38.6	30.6	21.9	13.4	42.3
Record high °C (°F)	11.7 (53.1)	14.4 (57.9)	17.7 (63.9)	28.1 (82.6)	34.6 (94.3)	34.0 (93.2)	34.2 (93.6)	34.6 (94.3)	33.4 (92.1)	26.7 (80.1)	18.7 (65.7)	13.17 (55.71)	34.6 (94.3)
Mean daily maximum °C (°F)	−7.1 (19.2)	−5.5 (22.1)	0.7 (33.3)	8.1 (46.6)	16.6 (61.9)	21.6 (70.9)	24.0 (75.2)	23.1 (73.6)	18.0 (64.4)	10.3 (50.5)	3.0 (37.4)	−3.9 (25.0)	9.1 (48.3)
Daily mean °C (°F)	−12.6 (9.3)	−11.3 (11.7)	−4.9 (23.2)	2.9 (37.2)	10.0 (50.0)	15.1 (59.2)	18.0 (64.4)	16.8 (62.2)	12.0 (53.6)	5.4 (41.7)	−1.2 (29.8)	−8.6 (16.5)	3.5 (38.2)
Mean daily minimum °C (°F)	−18.1 (−0.6)	−17.0 (1.4)	−10.4 (13.3)	−2.5 (27.5)	3.4 (38.1)	8.6 (47.5)	11.9 (53.4)	10.4 (50.7)	5.8 (42.4)	0.4 (32.7)	−5.3 (22.5)	−13.2 (8.2)	−2.2 (28.1)
Record low °C (°F)	−38.8 (−37.8)	−33.4 (−28.1)	−33.6 (−28.5)	−19.3 (−2.7)	−5.6 (21.9)	−2.6 (27.3)	2.7 (36.9)	−0.2 (31.6)	−6.3 (20.7)	−9.6 (14.7)	−23.2 (−9.8)	−33.9 (−29.0)	−38.8 (−37.8)
Record low wind chill	−46	−43	−42	−30	−11	−4	0	0	−8	−13	−28	−42	−46
Average precipitation mm (inches)	91.5 (3.60)	67.5 (2.66)	77.5 (3.05)	77.1 (3.04)	87.4 (3.44)	98.2 (3.87)	119.3 (4.70)	101.4 (3.99)	94.9 (3.74)	100.4 (3.95)	98.3 (3.87)	90.5 (3.56)	1,104 (43.47)
Average rainfall mm (inches)	24.3 (0.96)	9.4 (0.37)	20.9 (0.82)	50.2 (1.98)	84.7 (3.33)	98.2 (3.87)	119.3 (4.70)	101.4 (3.99)	94.9 (3.74)	92.4 (3.64)	65.0 (2.56)	31.5 (1.24)	792.2 (31.2)
Average snowfall cm (inches)	78.2 (30.8)	64.4 (25.4)	59.6 (23.5)	26.0 (10.2)	2.2 (0.9)	0.0 (0.0)	0.0 (0.0)	0.0 (0.0)	0.0 (0.0)	6.7 (2.6)	32.3 (12.7)	65.5 (25.8)	334.9 (131.9)
Average precipitation days (≥ 0.2 mm)	16.1	12.5	13.0	13.9	15.0	14.7	15.9	13.9	13.2	15.2	14.8	15.3	173.5
Average rainy days (≥ 0.2 mm)	3.3	1.8	4.6	9.5	14.7	14.7	15.9	13.9	13.2	14.1	8.6	4.3	118.6
Average snowy days (≥ 0.2 cm)	15.3	12.1	10.7	6.3	0.85	0	0	0	0.04	2.1	8.4	13.9	69.69
Average relative humidity (%)	74.7	71.3	67.8	57.7	50.2	55.4	59.8	58.7	60.6	64.3	75.6	77.8	64.5
Source: Environment Canada

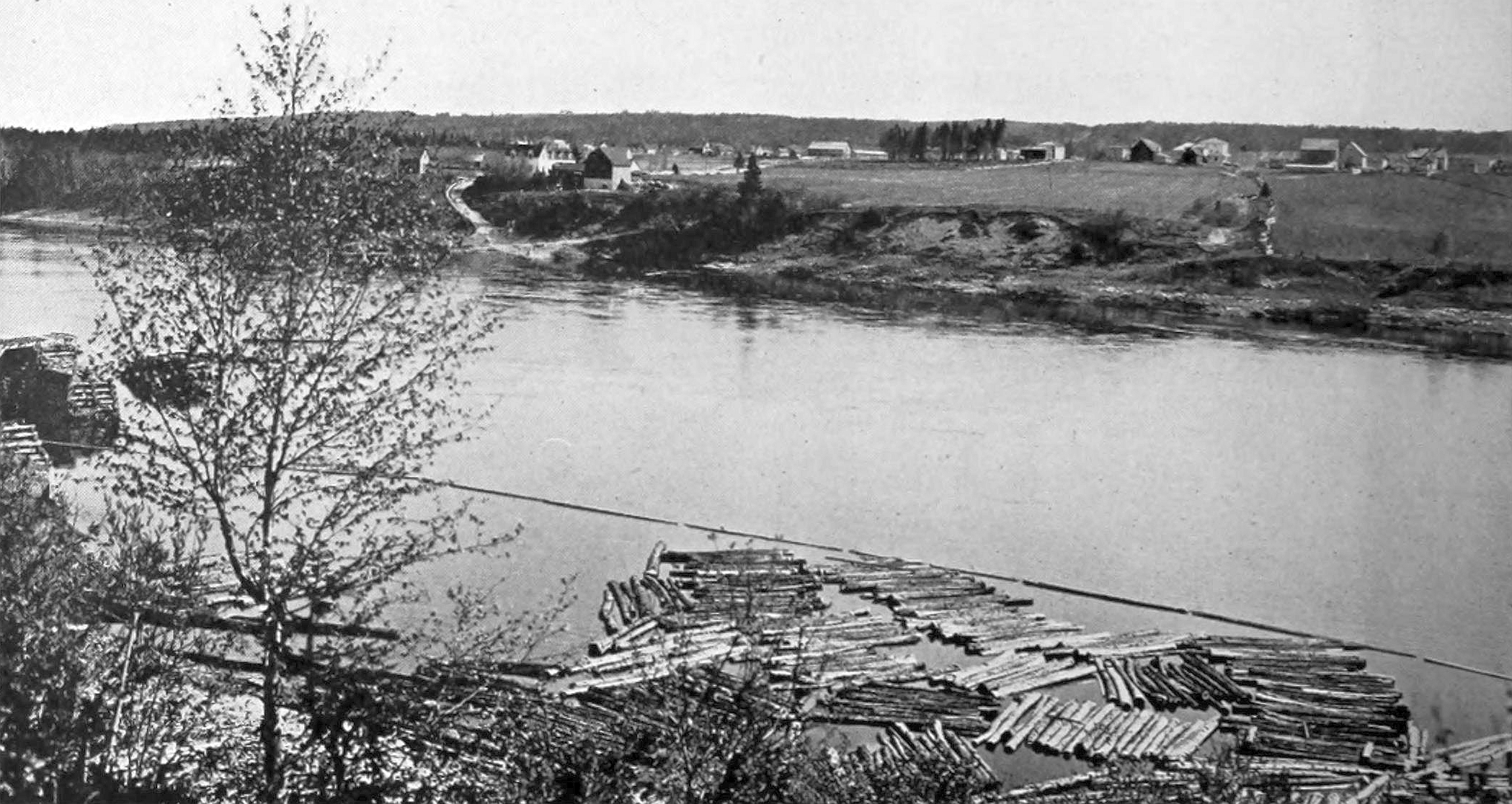
Saint-Léonard, 1918

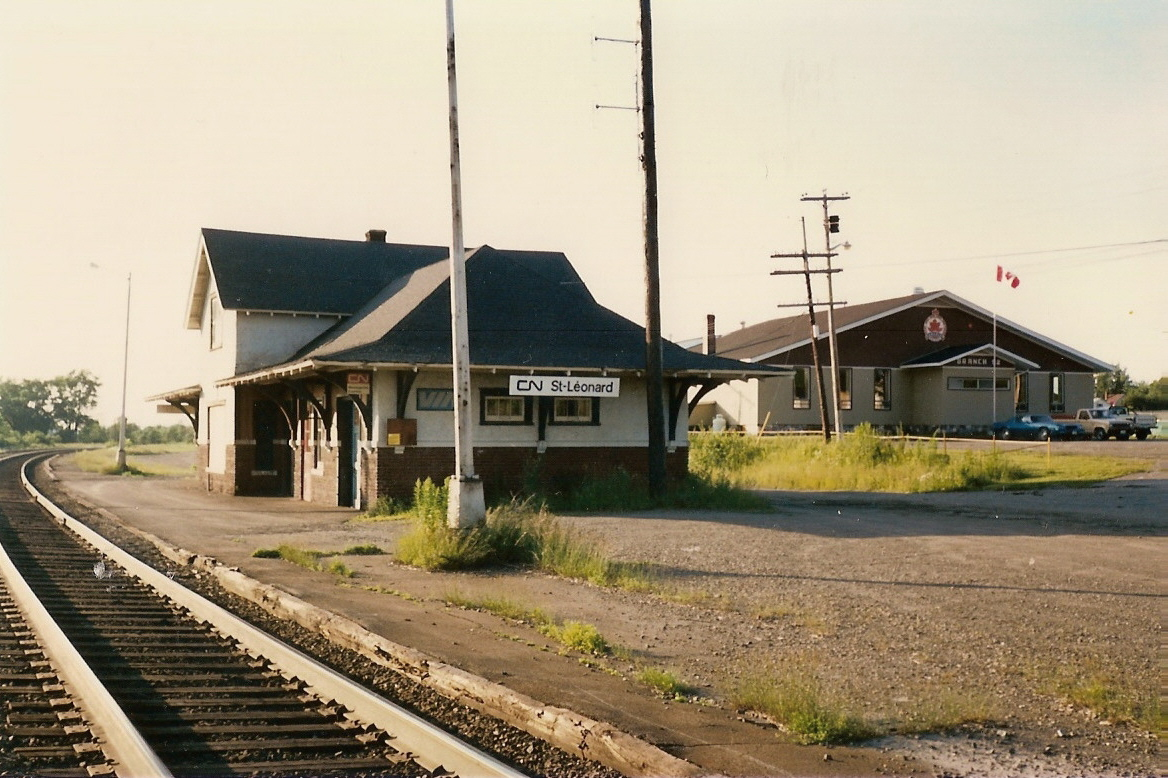
Saint-Leonard railroad station

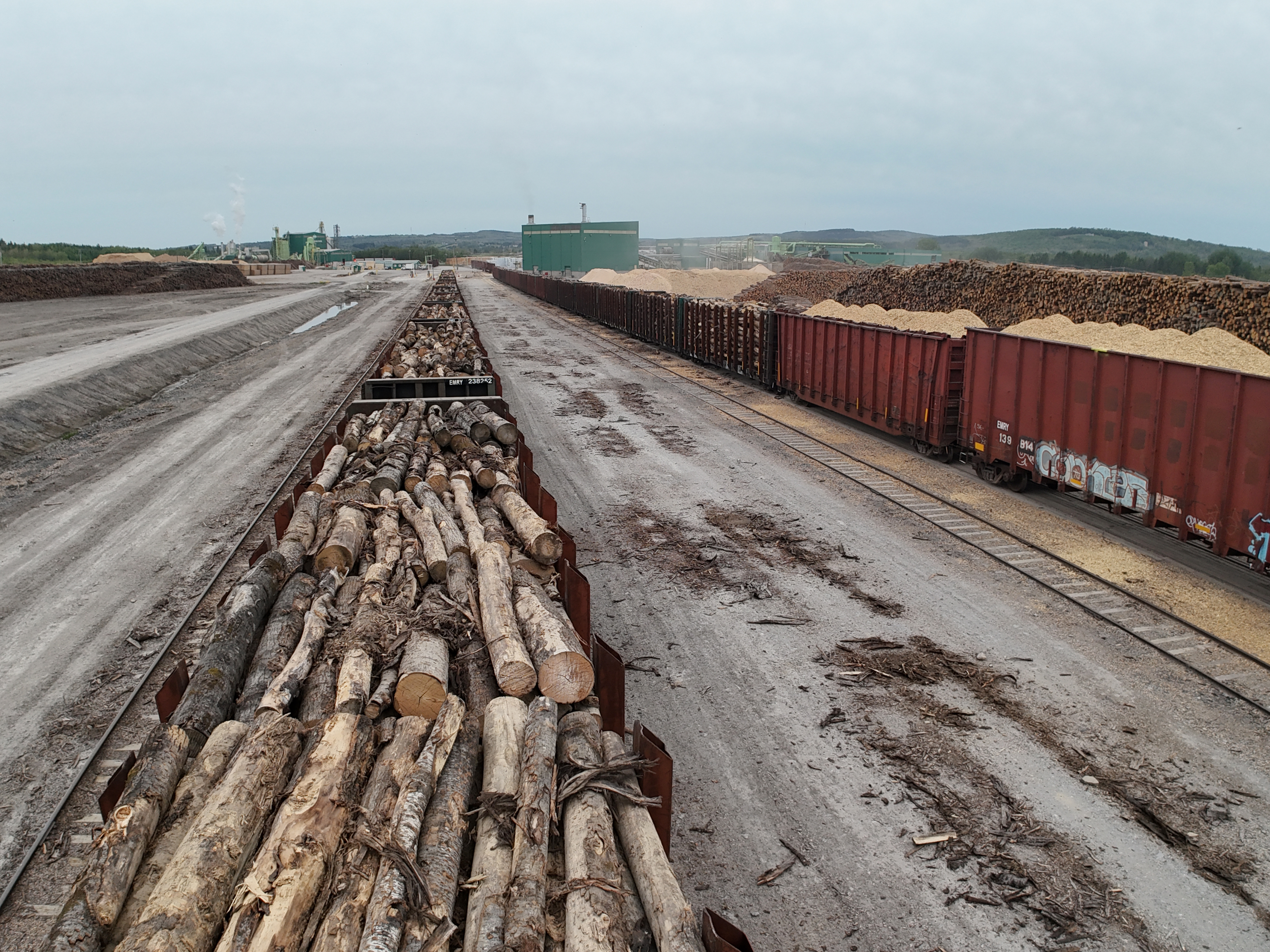
J.D. Irving sawmill

== Demographics ==
In the 2021 Census of Population conducted by Statistics Canada, Saint-Léonard had a population of 1,322 living in 567 of its 625 total private dwellings, a change of 1.7% from its 2016 population of 1,300. With a land area of 5.34 km^{2} (2.06 sq mi), it had a population density of 247.6/km^{2} (641.2/sq mi) in 2021.

Saint-Léonard, NB Historical populations
Year	Pop.	±%
1941	1,095	—
1951	1,419	+29.6%
1961	1,666	+17.4%
1991	1,545	−7.3%
1996	1,450	−6.1%
2001	1,385	−4.5%
2006	1,352	−2.4%
2011	1,343	−0.7%
2016	1,300	−3.2%

Mother tongue language (2006)

Language	Population	Pct (%)
French only	1,165	89.62%
English only	70	5.38%
Other languages	55	4.23%
Both English and French	10	0.77%

== Education ==
It has a single school, École Grande-Rivière.

== See also ==
- List of communities in New Brunswick
