= Saint-Jacques, New Brunswick =

Former village in New Brunswick

Coordinates: 47.434°N 68.389°W

Location of Saint-Jacques in New Brunswick

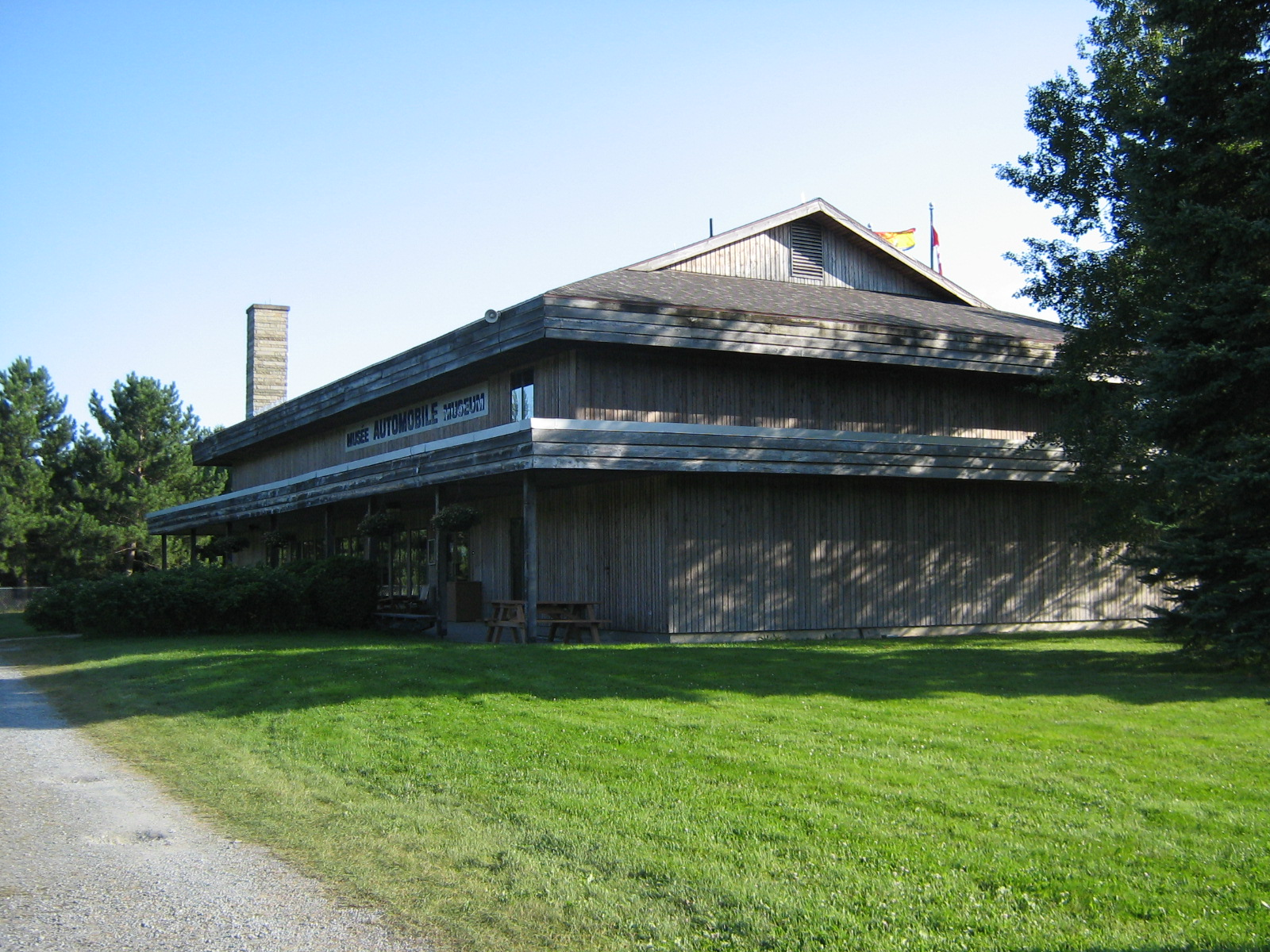
Automobile Museum in Republic Provincial Park, Saint-Jacques, New Brunswick, Canada.

Saint-Jacques was a village in New Brunswick until it was amalgamated into the city of Edmundston in 1998.
