= Michel Gagné (Canadian chess player) =

Canadian chess player and writer

Michel Gagné CM
- Born: May 9, 1957 (age 69); Edmundston, New Brunswick, Canada
- Occupations: Chess player, writer, public speaker
- Awards: Member of the Order of Canada (1991)

Michel Gagné CM (born May 9, 1957) is a Canadian chess player, writer, and public speaker from Edmundston, New Brunswick.

Gagné helped found several community organizations, including the RADO food bank and the paratransit service Mobile Plus. He is involved in promoting the inclusion and personal development of people with disabilities.

He has served as a city councillor in Edmundston.

== Honours ==
He was made a Member of the Order of Canada on October 30, 1991.
