= Saint John West =

City region in Canada

- Neighbourhood
- Interactive map of Saint John West
- Location within New Brunswick
- Coordinates: 45°15′20″N 66°4′27″W
- Country: Canada
- Province: New Brunswick
- City: Saint John
- Postal code: E2M
- Telephone Exchanges: 506 428
- GNBC code: DAEEK

Saint John West is a neighbourhood in Saint John, New Brunswick, Canada.

It is located west of the Saint John Harbour, and includes the former city of Lancaster.

== See also ==
- Saint John, New Brunswick
