= Lancaster, New Brunswick =

Former city in New Brunswick, Canada

Lancaster
- Former city
- Location within New Brunswick
- Coordinates: 45.250°N 66.100°W
- Country: Canada
- Province: New Brunswick
- County: Saint John
- City: Saint John
- Founded: 1875
- Amalgamated: 1967
- Time zone: UTC-4 (Atlantic (AST))
  - Summer (DST): UTC-3 (ADT)
- Area code: 506

Lancaster is a former city in New Brunswick, Canada that is now within the City of Saint John. It is west side of the Saint John River and on the north shore of the Bay of Fundy.

== History ==
Federal census population history of Lancaster
Year	Pop.	±%
1956	12,371	—
1961	13,848	+11.9%
1966	15,836	+14.4%
Source: Statistics Canada

Lancaster was originally five unincorporated communities – Beaconsfield, Fairville, Milford, Randolph, and South Bay. These five communities unified by incorporating as the City of Lancaster on January 1, 1953. Its first mayor was T. B. Horsler. Fourteen years later, Lancaster amalgamated with Saint John on January 1, 1967. The area in which it had been located now consists of the neighbourhood of Saint John West.

== Government ==
Lancaster is part of the provincial Saint John Lancaster riding and the federal Saint John—St. Croix riding.

== See also ==
- List of cities in New Brunswick
- Portland, New Brunswick, another former city in New Brunswick
