= New Brunswick Botanical Garden =

Provincial park in Edmundston, New Brunswick, Canada

New Brunswick Botanical Garden Jardin botanique du Nouveau-Brunswick
- IUCN category II (national park)
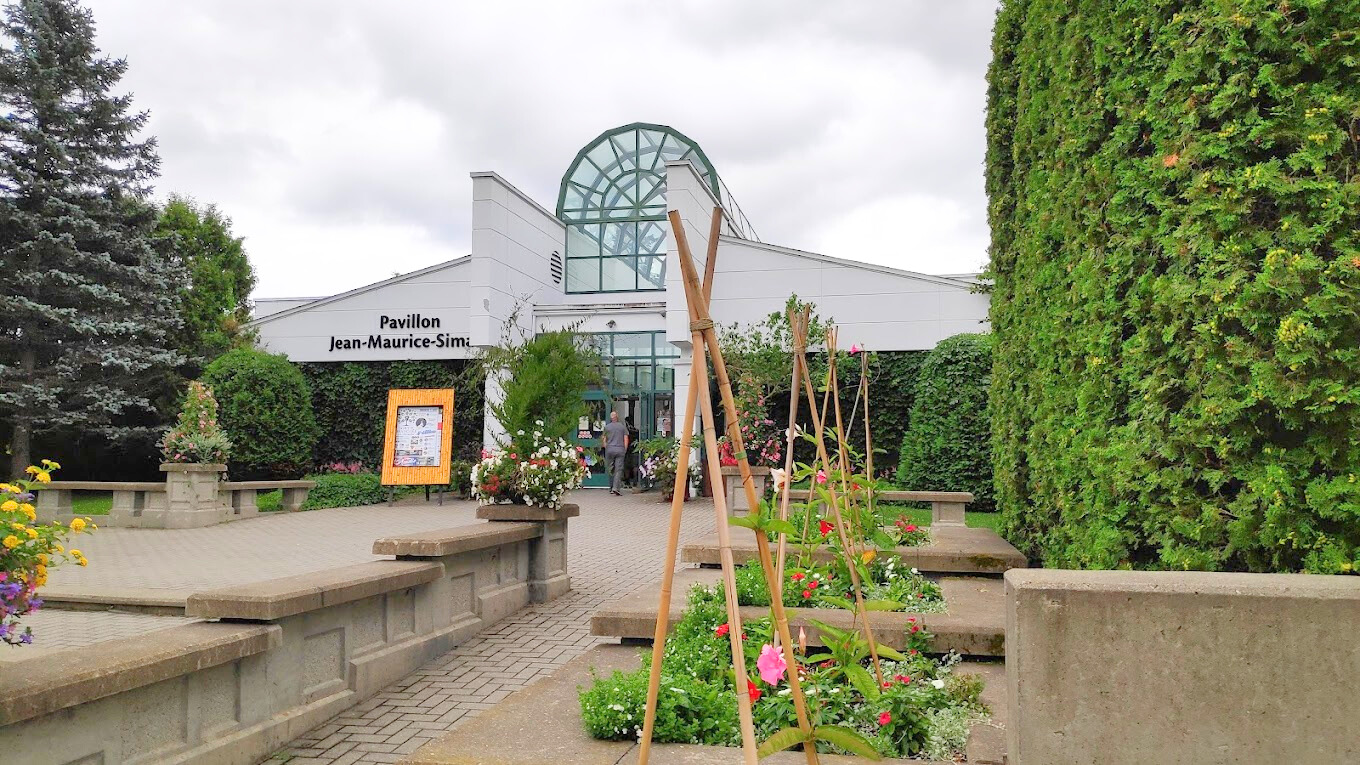
- Interactive map of New Brunswick Botanical Garden; Jardin botanique du Nouveau-Brunswick
- Location: Madawaska County, New Brunswick, Canada
- Nearest city: Edmundston
- Coordinates: 47°26′35″N 68°23′50″W
- Area: 7 hectares (17 acres)
- Established: 1993
- Visitors: n/a (in 2009)
- Governing body: New Brunswick Botanical Garden Society

The New Brunswick Botanical Garden is a provincial park located in suburban Saint-Jacques neighbourhood in Edmundston, New Brunswick. Situated on 7 hectares (17 acres) next to the Madawaska River, it has more than 80,000 plants, making it the largest arboretum east of Montreal. The Botanical Garden opens in early May and is open daily for the summer season. In addition to the Botanical Gardens, the Province of New Brunswick also maintains an antique automobile museum on the same grounds. The Trans Canada Trail also passes beside by the park.

== History ==
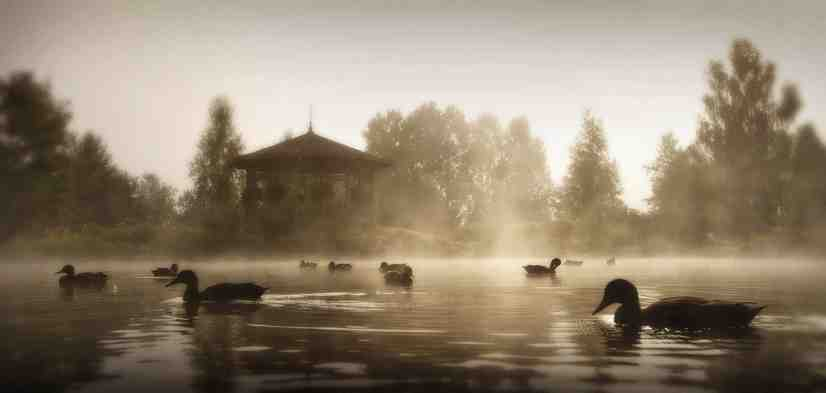
Ducks in the Mist

The Botanical Garden opened in June 1993. A lack of operating funds nearly caused it to close a few years after its inauguration. The garden was rescued by leaders of the University of Moncton Campus at Edmundston (UMCE), which was subsequently given the mandate to manage the garden from 1997 to 2007.

In November 2006, the UMCE informed the Province of New-Brunswick, Tourism and Parks Department, that they would not renew their management contract and on June 21, 2007, the City of Edmundston signed an agreement with the minister of Tourism and Parks for New Brunswick for one-year management of the garden. Ultimately, the City declined to get involved directly with the management and that mandate was transferred to the New Brunswick Botanical Garden Society. A five-year agreement was signed in April 2008 between these three organizations to ensure the functioning and long-term development of the garden.

== Mission ==
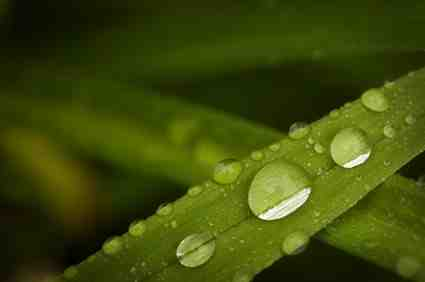
New Brunswick Botanical Garden

The New Brunswick Botanical Garden (NBBG) subscribes to the "mission" of most of the largest botanical gardens. This general mission has been defined by the International Agenda for Botanical Gardens in Conservation and can be summarized as follows:

- Slow the loss of plant species and their genetic diversity.
- Concentrate on the prevention of degradations in worldwide natural environments.
- Increase public awareness and comprehension on the value of plant diversity and potential threats.
- Engage in practical actions for the benefit and improvement of the natural environment.
- Promote and ensure sustainable management of natural resources by present generations and those to come.

The accomplishment of the mission asks botanical gardens to undertake a large range of activities as suggested in the Agenda. However, as botanical gardens cannot accomplish this mission on their own, they need to work in partnership with many institutions, societies, communities and individuals.

== Displays ==
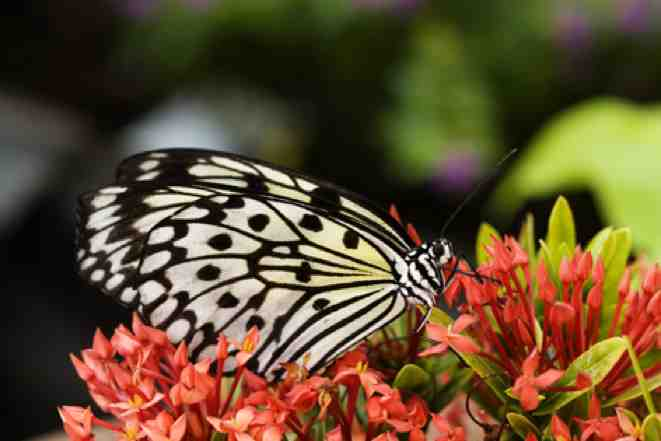
Butterflies of the World

There are several display areas in the Botanical Garden, some of which vary from year to year. Recent displays have included:

=== Butterflies of the World ===
This permanent display, situated in the main pavilion, features blue morphos from the tropical forests of South and Central America.

=== Charles Darwin ===
The exhibition is called "Charles Darwin and the Idea of Evolution" and it presents Darwin's life, challenges, observations and stunning discoveries. The exhibition took place from June 18 to September 30, 2009.

=== Birds and Colours ===
"Birds and Colors" was a live exhibition that was presented during the 2008 summer season. More than 50 species of birds from all around the world were presented. Some of the birds remained in certain exhibitions in 2009.

=== Tulips ===
Starting mid-May, approximately 10,000 bulbs distributed into forty varieties of tulips, crocus are planted and bloom early in the season. Blooming typically occurs from mid-May to mid-June.

=== Mosaiculture ===
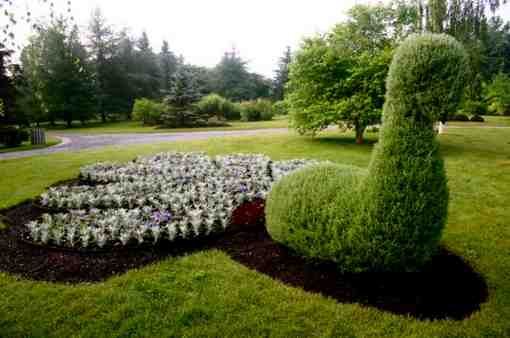
The Peafowl, mosaiculture.

The mosaiculture is a form of art which uses plants to accomplish drawings. The origin of mosaicultures traces back to the embroidery bed of 16th and 17th centuries. At the end of the 1860s, the term "mosaiculture" was used for the first time at the parc de la Tête d'Or in Lyon. In the beginning, gardeners created simple geometric forms but over the years, mosaiculture has become more complex and has come to include such three-dimensional shapes as butterflies, vases and birds. The gardens have several such examples on display. Today, several cities practice this art which is a tool of flowers development and horticultural expression.

== Thematics Garden ==
Annuals

The annuals garden features plant produced in the garden plant nursery. Numerous flower beds are laid out symmetrically shaped and contain hundreds of plant types.

Roses

The garden has a notable collection of rosebushes which flower all summer.

Alpines

The alpine garden is a replica of a mountain environment, habitat for many alpine plants found in different parts of the world. It also serves as the starting point for one of the main attractions of the Botanical Garden, the waterfall.

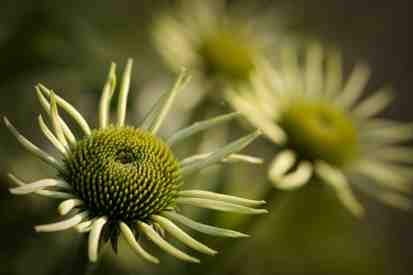
The Gardens, New Brunswick Botanical Garden.

Perennials

The perennial garden suggests arrangements which transform all season long.

Shade Garden

The trees overlooking the garden form a natural roof which ensures the right amount of light to shine through to sustain the shade and light-shade plants.

"The Flowery Brook"

In this well furnished garden that the water circulating through the Botanical Garden returns to the Madawaska River. During the summer, the aquatic plants and the perennials show their nicest colors. In fall, the takes on a fresh new look with ornamental grasses blending into new background decor. Many birds and ducks are also an element in this garden.

Rhododendrons

These plants represent a unique aspect of the Maritime Region for their ability to survive in cold climates and acid soil conditions. They are an attraction during the first weeks of the summer season after which, the shape and texture of the plants maintains interest all summer.

Vegetable garden

This garden features a variety of vegetables as well as fruit trees, vines, edible and medicinal plants and some experimental plants.

== Accessibility and restrictions ==
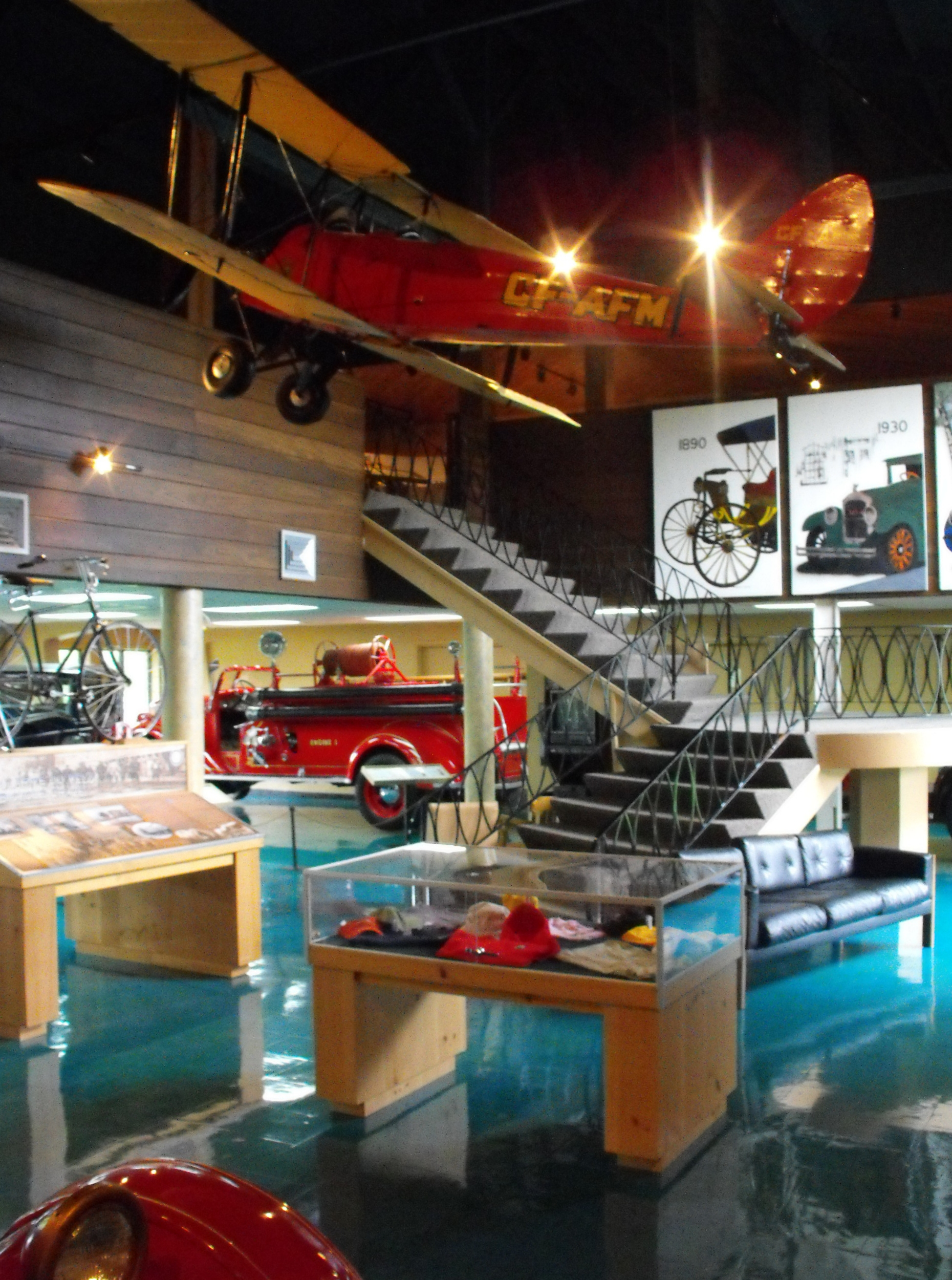
Antique auto museum.

The Botanical Gardens is accessible via Exit 8 on New Brunswick Route 2 just east of the New Brunswick-Quebec border. The park is wheelchair accessible but can be difficult in some areas. There is one wheelchair available on site so reserve in advance. No pets are permitted in the gardens. There are picnic tables near the front of the building, but eating is not permitted in the gardens. In peak season there is a coffee shop inside the admissions building, and the gift shop has a few unique items to see. Formal photographs including wedding photos are permitted in the gardens but it has to be prearranged with staff. Guided tours are available upon reservation only.

In addition to the Botanical Gardens, the Province of New Brunswick also maintains an antique automobile museum on the same grounds, featuring a Bricklin and about two dozen examples of early motoring history. The Trans Canada Trail also passes beside by the park.
