= Portland, New Brunswick =

Former city in New Brunswick, Canada

Portland
- Former city
- Location within New Brunswick
- Coordinates: 45.267°N 66.050°W
- Country: Canada
- Province: New Brunswick
- County: Saint John
- City: Saint John
- Named: 1783
- Established (parish): 1786
- Incorporated (town): 1871
- Incorporated (city): 1883
- Amalgamated: April 17, 1889
- Time zone: UTC-4 (Atlantic (AST))
  - Summer (DST): UTC-3 (ADT)
- Area code: 506

Portland is a former city in New Brunswick, Canada that amalgamated with the City of Saint John in 1889.

== History ==
The community was named after William Cavendish-Bentinck, 3rd Duke of Portland, who served as the prime minister of Great Britain in 1783. The area was established as a parish in 1786. Eighty-five years later, Portland was first incorporated as a town in 1871 and then attained city status in 1883. On April 17, 1889, the cities of Portland and Saint John amalgamated to become the new City of Saint John.

== Geography ==
Portland fronts Saint John Harbour where the Saint John River empties into the Bay of Fundy.

== Demographics ==
Federal census population history of Portland
Year	Pop.	±%
1871	12,520	—
1881	15,226	+21.6%
Source: Statistics Canada

Portland had a population of 15,226 in 1881, a change of 21.6% from its 1871 population of 12,520. It was ranked as the ninth largest municipality in Canada in both the 1871 Census of Canada and the 1881 Census of Canada.

== See also ==
- Lancaster, New Brunswick, another former city in New Brunswick
- List of cities in New Brunswick
