= Edmundston =

- City
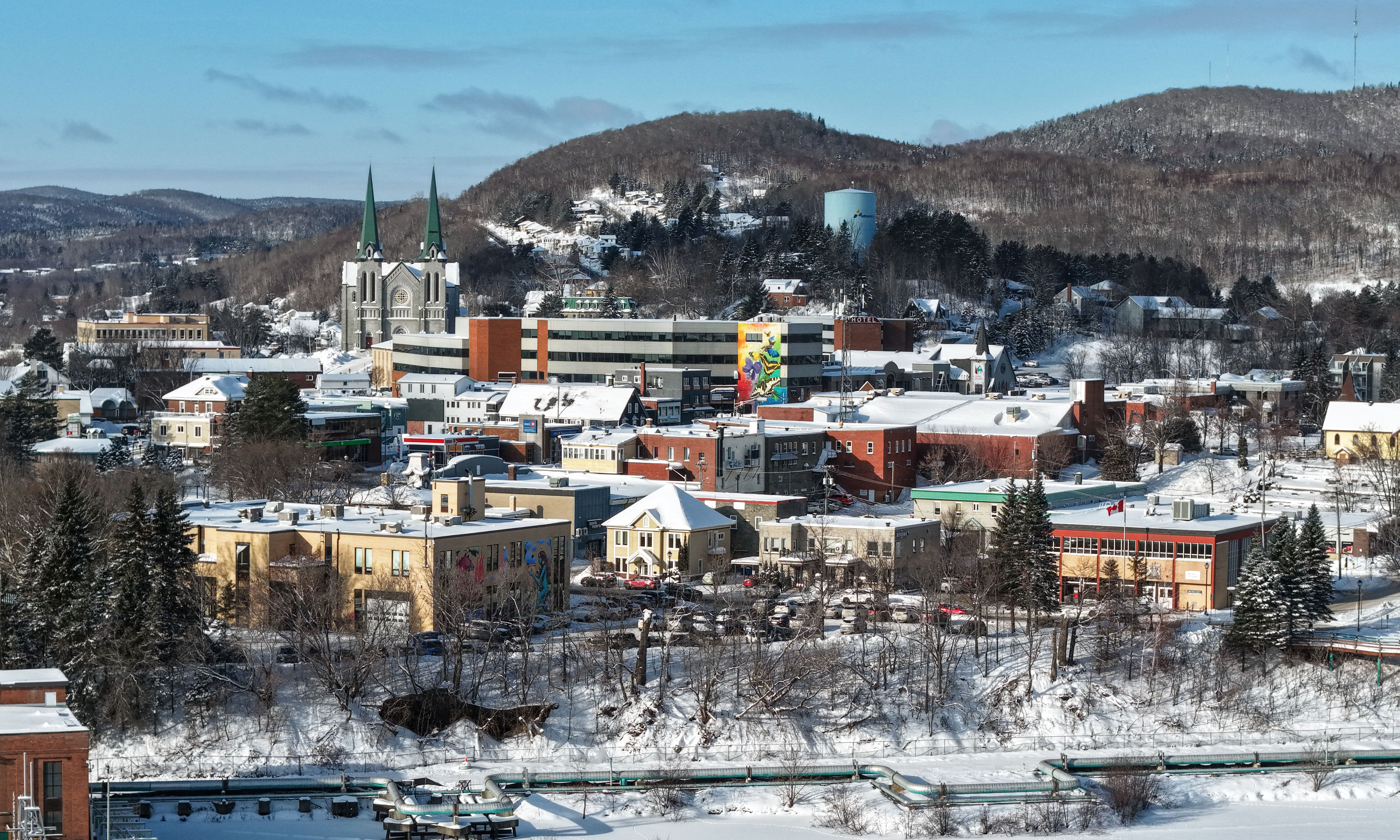
- Downtown Edmundston (2026)

- Flag

- Location within New Brunswick
- Coordinates: 47°22′35″N 68°19′31″W
- Country: Canada
- Province: New Brunswick
- County: Madawaska
- Parish: Madawaska
- Established: 1850
- City: April 1, 1952
- Electoral Districts Federal: Madawaska—Restigouche
- Provincial: Edmundston-Madawaska Centre; Madawaska Les Lacs-Edmundston

Government
  - Type: City Council
  - Mayor: Eric Marquis
  - Councillors: List of Members: Sylvie St-Onge Morneau; Gilles Duval; Diane Bélanger Nadeau; Denise Landry-Nadeau; Pierre Couturier; Richard Couturier; Karen Power; Eric McGuire; Jean Luc Michaud

Area
  - Land: 106.84 km^{2} (41.25 sq mi)
  - Urban: 17.88 km^{2} (6.90 sq mi)
  - Metro: 1,582.36 km^{2} (610.95 sq mi)
- Highest elevation: 264 m (866 ft)
- Lowest elevation: 151 m (495 ft)

Population (2021)
  - City: 16,437
  - Density: 153.8/km^{2} (398/sq mi)
  - Metro: 21,154
  - Metro density: 14/km^{2} (36/sq mi)
  - Change 2016–21: ▼0.9%
- Time zone: UTC-4 (AST)
  - Summer (DST): UTC-3 (ADT)
- Postal code(s): E3V, E7B
- Area code: 506: Area exchanges: 200 223 253 254 353 419 501 514 733 735 736 737 739 740 838 880 986 996
- Dwellings: 8,051
- Median Income*: $51,435 CDN
- NTS Map: 21N8 Edmundston
- GNBC Code: DALZZ
- Website: edmundston.ca

Edmundston (/ˈɛdməndstən/) is a city in Madawaska County, New Brunswick, Canada. Established in 1850, it had a population of 16,437 as of 2021.

On January 1, 2023, Edmundston amalgamated with the village of Rivière-Verte and parts of two local service districts; revised census figures have not been released.

== History ==
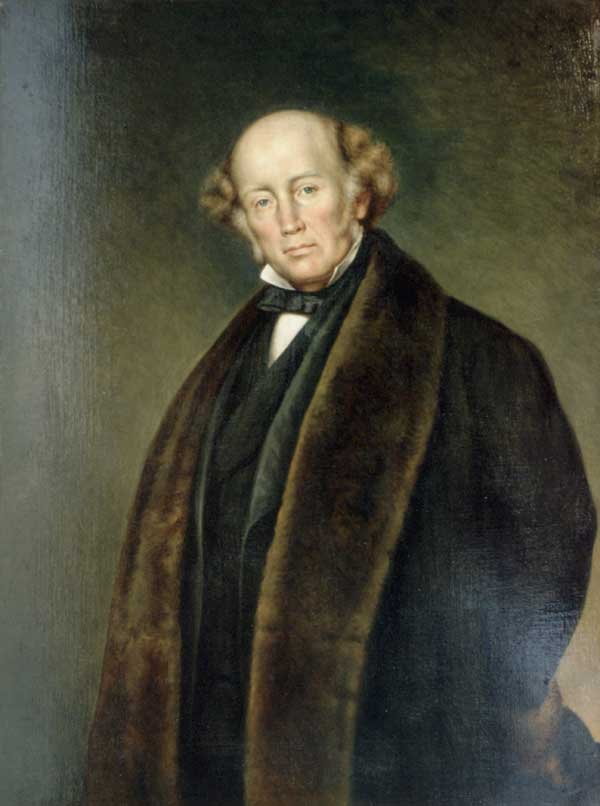
Sir Edmund Walker Head, on behalf of whom the city of Edmundston was named

During the early colonial period, the area was a camping and meeting place of the Wolastoqiyik (Maliseet) during seasonal migrations. From the mid to late eighteenth century, one of the largest Wolastoqey villages had been established at Madawaska and had become a refuge site for other Wabanaki peoples. The Wolastoqey village was originally located near the falls at the confluence of the Madawaska and Saint John Rivers. Currently, the City of Edmundston surrounds a federal Indian Reserve (St. Basile 10/Madawaska Maliseet First Nation). Originally named Petit-Sault (Little Falls) in reference to the waterfalls located where the Madawaska River merges into the Saint John River, the settlement was renamed Edmundston in 1851 after Sir Edmund Walker Head, who was Lieutenant-Governor of New Brunswick from 1848 to 1854 and Governor-General of Canada from 1854 to 1861. Originally a small logging settlement, Edmundston's growth is mostly attributed to the city's strategic location.

=== Aroostook War and the "Republic of Madawaska" ===
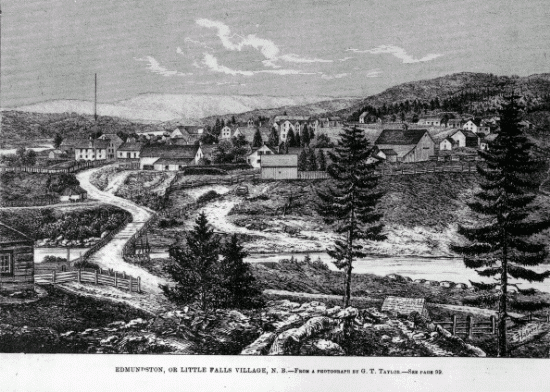
Edmundston in 1872

The area was at the centre of the Aroostook War of 1839, a skirmish over boundary lines between the U.S.A. and what was then British North America. Originally confined to a disagreement between the State of Maine and the Colony of New Brunswick, the dispute eventually spread to involve the Government of the United States in Washington, D.C. and the British Colonial Administration in Quebec City, seat of the Governor General of Canada, who had supreme authority over all of British North America, including New Brunswick. In the wake of this international conflict, a small fortification (Fortin du Petit-Sault) was built in anticipation of a possible attack by Americans, to complement the much larger fortification located at Fort Ingall (now Cabano) in nearby Canada (now Quebec). One of the central figures at the origin of the conflict was American-born industrialist "Colonel" John Baker, who had established sawmills and other lumber-related industries on the eastern shores of the Saint John river, an area claimed by the British that Baker wanted to be declared part of Maine as he was a fiercely nationalist American.

When the terms of the treaty that was signed following the conflict left Baker's properties firmly planted on British soil, and with the lack of support from the US Government to oppose the decision, Baker was facing the dilemma of either moving his facilities across the river on the American side, or to accept British sovereignty. Unwilling to do either, he declared the area an independent state called the "Republic of Madawaska", declaring himself head of state with the overwhelming support of the local, mostly French-speaking but independent-minded population. The "Republic" was never recognized and never had legal existence, but nevertheless the concept has remained so popular with the francophone Brayon residents on both the Canadian and American sides of the border that they refer to the region as the Republic of Madawaska to this day, and each mayor of Edmundston still receives the title of "President of the Republic of Madawaska". Baker's wife, Sophie Rice, designed the Republic's "eagle" flag that is still in use and a common sight in the area.

=== Amalgamation ===
In 1998, Edmundston, Saint-Basile, Saint-Jacques and Verret merged to form the City of Edmundston. In 2023 Edmundston expanded again to include Rivière-Verte and parts of adjacent local service districts.

== Geography ==
Edmundston is located at the edge of the New Brunswick "panhandle", in the northeastern section of the Appalachian Mountains at the junction of the Saint John and Madawaska Rivers in the northwestern part of the province. Edmundston is strategically situated only a few kilometres from the border with Quebec and is on the border with the United States, opposite the town of Madawaska, Maine, to which it is connected by the Edmundston–Madawaska Bridge.

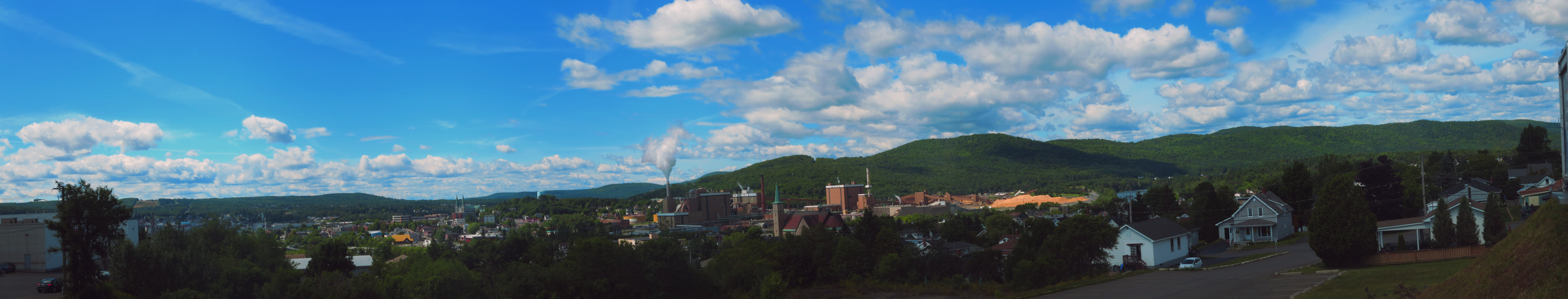
A panoramic outlook of Edmundston, showcasing its landscape and city features.

== Demographics ==
In the 2021 Census of Population conducted by Statistics Canada, Edmundston had a population of 16,437 living in 7,707 of its 8,117 total private dwellings, a change of −0.9% from its 2016 population of 16,580. With a land area of 106.84 square kilometres (41.25 sq mi), it had a population density of 153.8/km^{2} (398.5/sq mi) in 2021.

Historical population
Year	Pop.	±%
1871	400	—
1911	1,821	+355.2%
1921	4,035	+121.6%
1931	6,430	+59.4%
1941	7,028	+9.3%
1951	10,753	+53.0%
1961	12,791	+19.0%
1971	12,365	−3.3%
1981	12,044	−2.6%
1986	11,497	−4.5%
1991	10,835	−5.8%
1996	11,033	+1.8%
2001	17,373	+57.5%
2006	16,643	−4.2%
2011	16,032	−3.7%
2016	16,580	+3.4%
In 1998, Saint-Basile, Saint-Jacques, and Verret were annexed by the City of Edmundston. Source:

The median household income in 2005 for Edmundston was $42,551, which is below the New Brunswick provincial average of $45,194.

=== Language ===
The city is 95 per cent francophone, the highest such proportion of all cities in the province. Edmundston is the third-largest predominantly francophone city in North America outside of Quebec and the Caribbean, behind Clarence-Rockland, Ontario, which has a population exceeding 20,000 and is 68 per cent francophone, and Dieppe, which has a population of 25,384 (2016 Census) and is roughly 80 percent francophone. Outside of Quebec, the cities of Ottawa (122,665), Sudbury (45,420), Toronto (34,900), Winnipeg (26,855), Moncton (20,425), Timmins (17,390), and Edmonton (15,715) have greater total numbers of francophones, but they are a minority group in those cities. 62.6% are fluent in English.

Mother tongue language

Canada Census Mother Tongue - Edmundston, New Brunswick
Census	Total	English			French			English & French			Other		
Year	Responses	Count	Trend	Pop %	Count	Trend	Pop %	Count	Trend	Pop %	Count	Trend	Pop %
2021	15,540	795	▼3.0%	5.1%	14,005	▼6.5%	90.1%	350	▲79.5%	2.3%	330	▲29.4%	2.1%
2016	16,270	820	▲17.1%	5.0%	14,975	▲3.4%	92.0%	195	▲14.7%	1.2%	255	▲82.1%	1.6%
2011	15,505	700	▼6.7%	4.5%	14,480	▼4.8%	93.4%	170	▲70.0%	1.1%	140	▼34.9%	0.9%
2006	16,290	750	▼10.2%	4.6%	15,215	▼3.2%	93.4%	100	▼42.9%	0.6%	215	▲43.3%	1.3%
2001	16,870	835	▲13.6%	4.9%	15,715	▲57.1%	93.2%	175	▲40.0%	1.0%	150	▲114.2%	0.9%
1996	10,940	735	n/a	6.7%	10,005	n/a	91.5%	125	n/a	1.1%	70	n/a	0.6%

=== Ethnicity ===
Unlike most other francophones living in the Maritimes, most people living in the Edmundston area do not consider themselves Acadians other than for statistical purposes. Most of them descend from French-Canadians who originally came from Lower Canada (now Quebec) along with a few Irish immigrants to settle the area in the century between 1820 and 1920, and absorbed the small group of Acadians who had arrived earlier. Nor do they consider themselves Québécois despite their heritage, mainly due to the politicization of Quebec-specific issues they do not feel concerned with. Residents speak with a distinctive local accent, colloquially called "l'accent brayon".

Panethnic groups in the City of Edmundston (2001−2021)
Panethnic group	2021		2016		2011		2006		2001	
Panethnic group	Pop.	%	Pop.	%	Pop.	%	Pop.	%	Pop.	%
European (Note: Statistic includes all persons that did not make up part of a visible minority or an indigenous identity.)	14,280	93.61%	14,875	94.75%	14,995	97.85%	15,910	97.67%	16,465	97.6%
Indigenous	380	2.49%	430	2.74%	200	1.31%	220	1.35%	230	1.36%
African	320	2.1%	160	1.02%	30	0.2%	45	0.28%	45	0.27%
Middle Eastern (Note: Statistic includes total responses of "West Asian" and "Arab" under visible minority section on census.)	135	0.88%	105	0.67%	15	0.1%	10	0.06%	0	0%
Southeast Asian (Note: Statistic includes total responses of "Filipino" and "Southeast Asian" under visible minority section on census.)	50	0.33%	50	0.32%	20	0.13%	10	0.06%	15	0.09%
South Asian	35	0.23%	25	0.16%	45	0.29%	10	0.06%	80	0.47%
Latin American	20	0.13%	10	0.06%	0	0%	20	0.12%	0	0%
East Asian (Note: Statistic includes total responses of "Chinese", "Korean", and "Japanese" under visible minority section on census.)	15	0.1%	60	0.38%	0	0%	25	0.15%	30	0.18%
Other/multiracial (Note: Statistic includes total responses of "Visible minority, n.i.e." and "Multiple visible minorities" under visible minority section on census.)	0	0%	10	0.06%	0	0%	45	0.28%	10	0.06%
Total responses	15,255	92.81%	15,700	94.69%	15,325	95.59%	16,290	97.88%	16,870	97.1%
Total population	16,437	100%	16,580	100%	16,032	100%	16,643	100%	17,373	100%
Note: Totals greater than 100% due to multiple origin responses

=== Religion ===
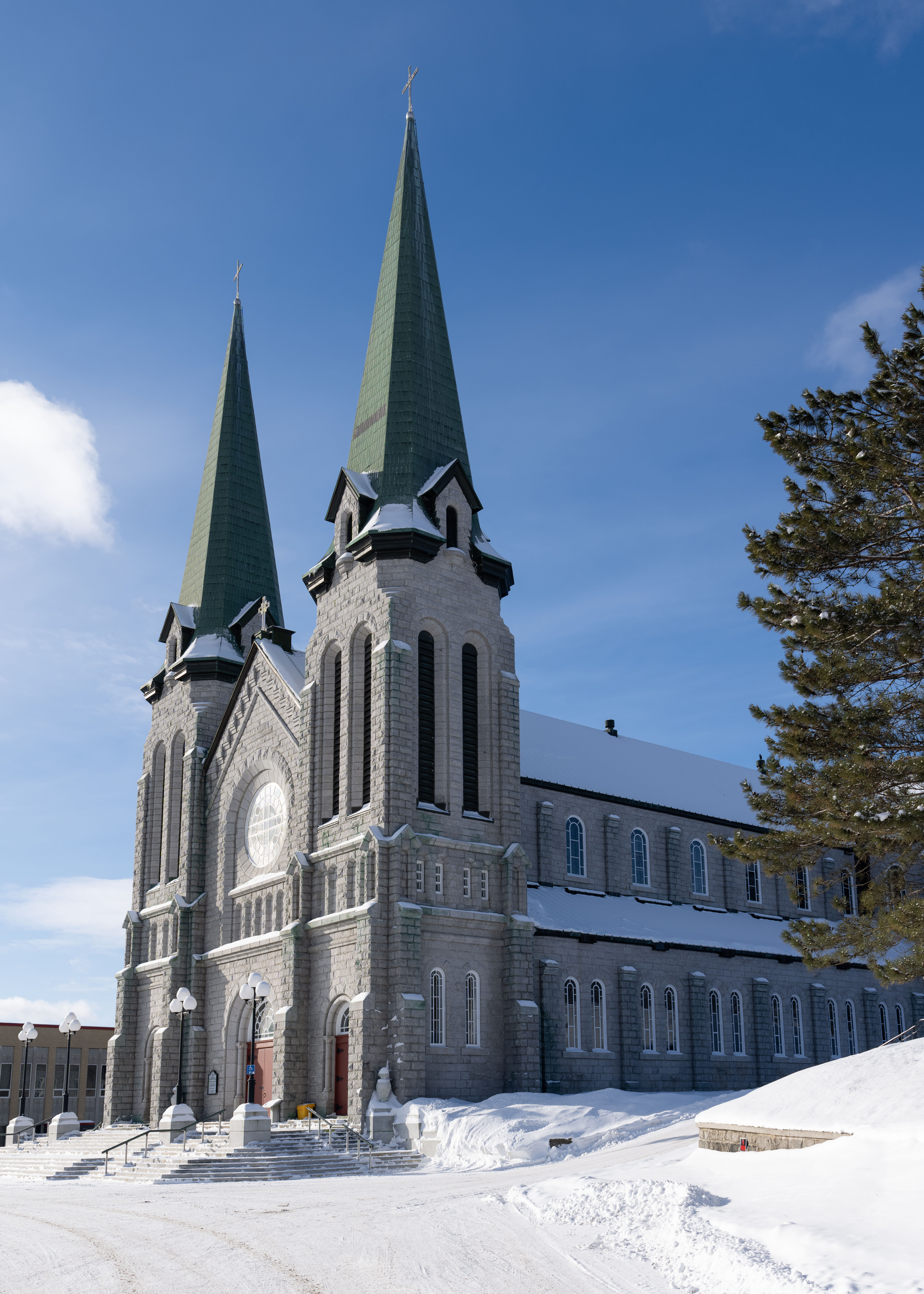
The Cathedral of Immaculate Conception, in downtown Edmundston.

Christianity is the dominant religion of the city's inhabitants, with most residents being Roman Catholics. Moreover, Edmundston gives its name to the episcopal see of the region. Edmundston covers four Catholic parishes. Protestant denominations established in city include the Anglican Church of Canada, the United Church of Canada, the United Pentecostal Church International and a French Christian church called Église de l'Espoir d'Edmundston. A small number of Muslims live in Edmundston and the surrounding area, practicing in their own community centre.

Religious make-up (2001)

Religion	Population	Pct (%)
Catholic	16,045	95.11%
Protestant	290	1.72%
Muslim	145	0.86%
Christian n.i.e.	35	0.21%
No religious affiliation	360	2.13%

== Climate ==
Edmundston experiences a humid continental climate (Köppen climate classification Dfb). The highest temperature ever recorded in Edmundston was 37.2 °C (99 °F) on 3 June 1919. The coldest temperature ever recorded was −43.6 °C (−46.5 °F) on 16 January 2009.

Climate data for Edmundston, 1991–2020 normals, extremes 1913–present
Month	Jan	Feb	Mar	Apr	May	Jun	Jul	Aug	Sep	Oct	Nov	Dec	Year
Record high humidex	12.2	10.4	26.0	26.7	39.3	40.4	42.8	39.3	39.0	32.6	23.8	17.2	42.8
Record high °C (°F)	13.0 (55.4)	15.0 (59.0)	25.0 (77.0)	28.0 (82.4)	34.5 (94.1)	37.2 (99.0)	36.1 (97.0)	35.6 (96.1)	33.6 (92.5)	30.6 (87.1)	23.3 (73.9)	15.6 (60.1)	37.2 (99.0)
Mean maximum °C (°F)	5.2 (41.4)	5.6 (42.1)	11.4 (52.5)	20.2 (68.4)	28.1 (82.6)	30.3 (86.5)	31.5 (88.7)	30.8 (87.4)	27.7 (81.9)	21.6 (70.9)	14.9 (58.8)	7.3 (45.1)	32.5 (90.5)
Mean daily maximum °C (°F)	−6.9 (19.6)	−4.8 (23.4)	1.2 (34.2)	8.5 (47.3)	17.2 (63.0)	22.1 (71.8)	25.0 (77.0)	24.1 (75.4)	19.2 (66.6)	11.5 (52.7)	4.0 (39.2)	−2.8 (27.0)	9.9 (49.8)
Daily mean °C (°F)	−13.0 (8.6)	−11.8 (10.8)	−5.5 (22.1)	2.4 (36.3)	10.1 (50.2)	15.0 (59.0)	18.1 (64.6)	17.0 (62.6)	12.3 (54.1)	5.8 (42.4)	−0.5 (31.1)	−7.7 (18.1)	3.5 (38.3)
Mean daily minimum °C (°F)	−19.1 (−2.4)	−18.7 (−1.7)	−11.9 (10.6)	−3.6 (25.5)	2.9 (37.2)	7.8 (46.0)	11.0 (51.8)	9.8 (49.6)	5.3 (41.5)	0.2 (32.4)	−4.9 (23.2)	−12.5 (9.5)	−2.8 (27.0)
Mean minimum °C (°F)	−33.8 (−28.8)	−33.5 (−28.3)	−27.8 (−18.0)	−13.2 (8.2)	−4.3 (24.3)	0.1 (32.2)	4.4 (39.9)	2.8 (37.0)	−3.1 (26.4)	−7.8 (18.0)	−16.9 (1.6)	−26.8 (−16.2)	−35.5 (−31.9)
Record low °C (°F)	−43.6 (−46.5)	−39.4 (−38.9)	−36.2 (−33.2)	−28.5 (−19.3)	−9.4 (15.1)	−4.4 (24.1)	1.3 (34.3)	−1.2 (29.8)	−6.6 (20.1)	−16.1 (3.0)	−26.0 (−14.8)	−40.0 (−40.0)	−43.6 (−46.5)
Record low wind chill	−48.8	−47.3	−39.0	−29.6	−7.6	−3.8	0.0	0.0	−7.2	−13.9	−25.3	−42.0	−48.8
Average precipitation mm (inches)	71.1 (2.80)	63.2 (2.49)	64.1 (2.52)	67.0 (2.64)	84.6 (3.33)	101.1 (3.98)	106.6 (4.20)	86.4 (3.40)	89.4 (3.52)	102.7 (4.04)	86.9 (3.42)	88.6 (3.49)	1,011.8 (39.83)
Average rainfall mm (inches)	12.7 (0.50)	9.1 (0.36)	17.0 (0.67)	46.7 (1.84)	90.0 (3.54)	97.4 (3.83)	113.8 (4.48)	93.4 (3.68)	94.6 (3.72)	90.8 (3.57)	64.7 (2.55)	22.9 (0.90)	753.0 (29.65)
Average snowfall cm (inches)	66.7 (26.3)	53.2 (20.9)	39.1 (15.4)	11.5 (4.5)	0.4 (0.2)	0.0 (0.0)	0.0 (0.0)	0.0 (0.0)	0.0 (0.0)	2.8 (1.1)	26.5 (10.4)	57.8 (22.8)	258.0 (101.6)
Average precipitation days (≥ 0.2 mm)	13.2	13.4	12.4	12.0	13.0	13.4	14.4	13.2	12.8	14.7	13.0	14.7	160.2
Average rainy days (≥ 0.2 mm)	1.5	1.2	3.0	7.6	11.8	12.1	12.2	11.3	11.2	11.9	7.8	2.7	94.4
Average snowy days (≥ 0.2 cm)	8.7	7.7	5.6	2.2	0.14	0.0	0.0	0.0	0.0	0.59	4.5	8.4	37.9
Average dew point °C (°F)	−15.8 (3.6)	−15.3 (4.5)	−11.1 (12.0)	−3.8 (25.2)	3.3 (37.9)	9.6 (49.3)	13.3 (55.9)	12.4 (54.3)	8.1 (46.6)	2.2 (36.0)	−4.0 (24.8)	−10.7 (12.7)	−0.9 (30.4)
Source 1: Environment Canada (rain/rain days, snow/snow days 1981–2010)
Source 2: weatherstats.ca (for dewpoint and monthly&yearly average absolute maximum&minimum temperature)

== Economy ==
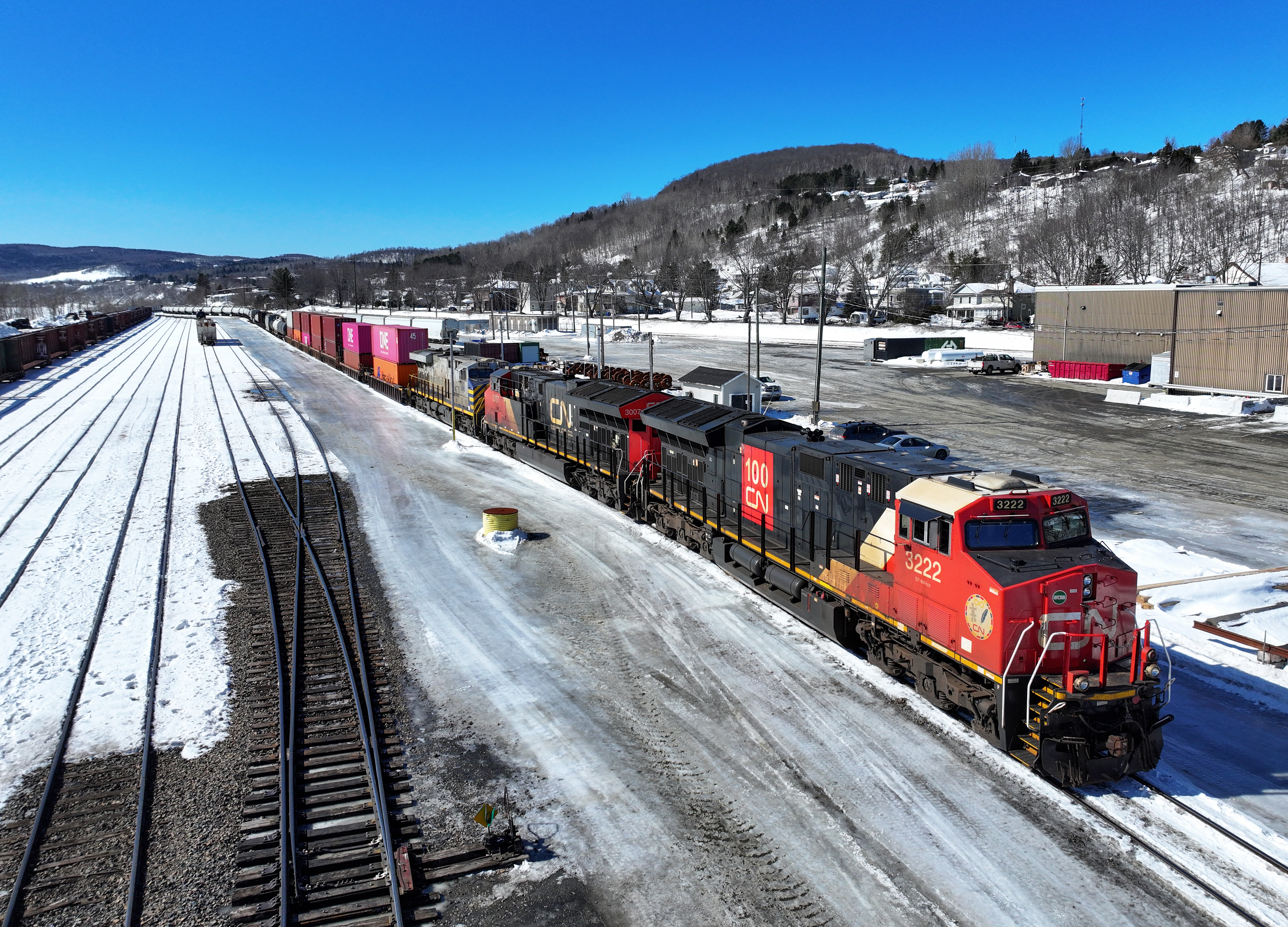
CN Edmundston Yard

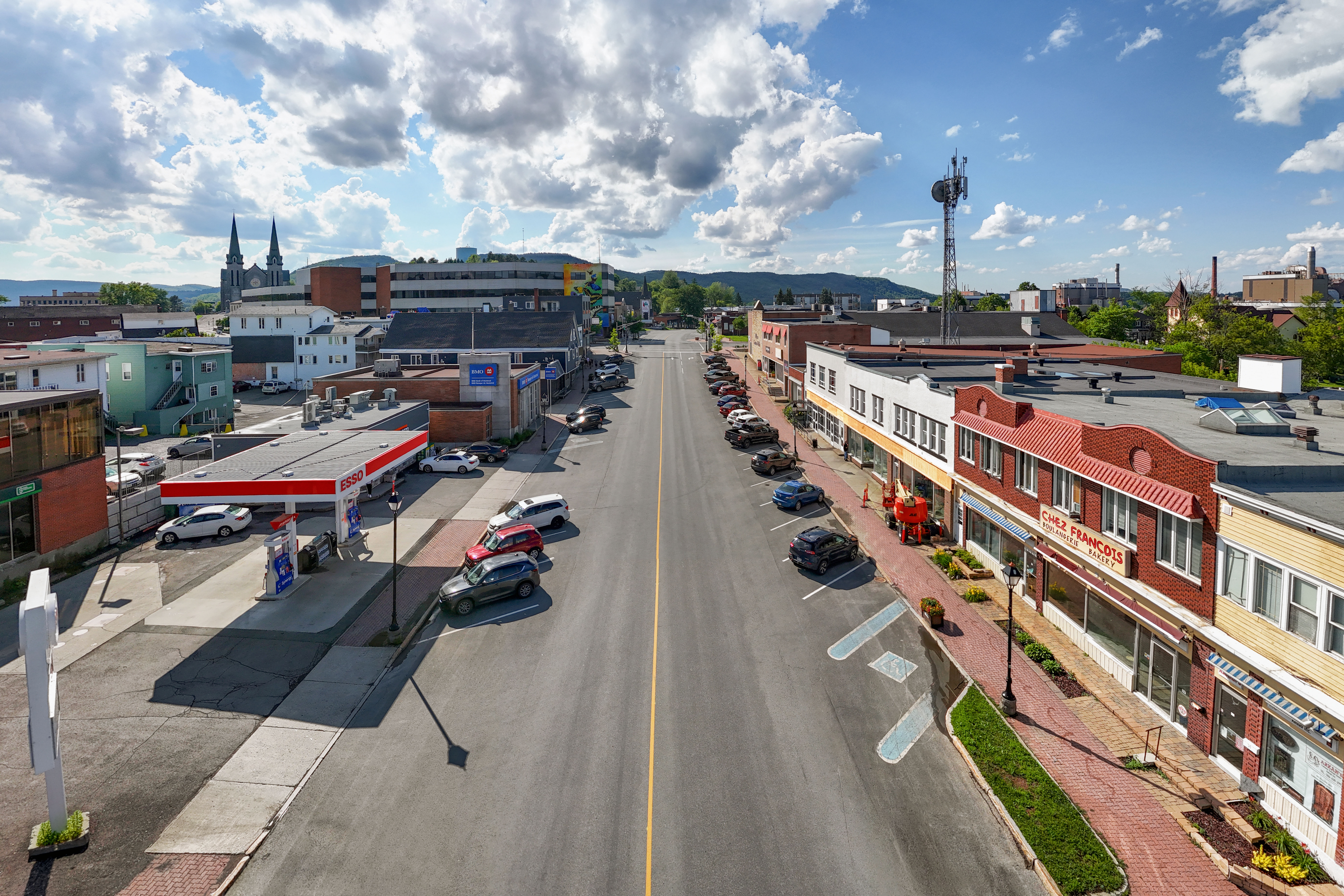
Canada Street in downtown

Edmundston is a rural town whose economy centres on the Saint John River paper industry. The river historically provided water power for the mills and was the route of log drives bringing pulpwood from upstream forests. The river still provides the water supply for paper manufacture, but environmental concerns encourage pulpwood delivery by highway and rail.

Forestry is one of the city's major industries, with several sawmills and paper plants in the vicinity, the largest being the Twin Rivers pulp mill, formerly owned by Fraser Papers, now owned by Norbord, by way of Noranda Forest (1998) and Nexfor (2004). The Edmundston pulp mill is paired with a Twin Rivers paper mill directly across the Saint John River in Madawaska, Maine, through which liquified pulp slurry is piped. The pulp is shipped across the border through a mile-long high pressure pipeline running between both facilities, and is made into paper in Madawaska. The Madawaska mill specializes in fine-grade papers. The town's economy is highly dependent upon cross-border trade, to the extent that Edmundston and its smaller sister city of Madawaska are considered by residents under many aspects, a single economic entity.

An illuminated sign and plastics manufacture owned by Pattison Sign is also important to the city's economy. IPL, a company that manufactures plastic eating utensils, has a facility in Edmundston.

The city is the site of the regional hospital for the area. It also hosts a campus of the French-language University of Moncton. In addition, New Brunswick's community college system has a campus in Edmundston.

== Arts and culture ==
Every June, Edmundston plays host to the Festival Jazz et Blues d'Edmundston (The Edmundston Jazz and Blues Festival).

The City is also host to the annual Festival Royal in early August; the Funk & Bier festival in Septembre, and the spectacular Grande Grouille at the New Brunswick Botanical Garden in October.

The three manual Casavant neo-baroque mechanical action pipe organ of the Church of Notre-Dame-des-Sept-Douleurs, situated in a hall with a superb live acoustic, is one of the finest pipe organs in Canada.

== Attractions ==
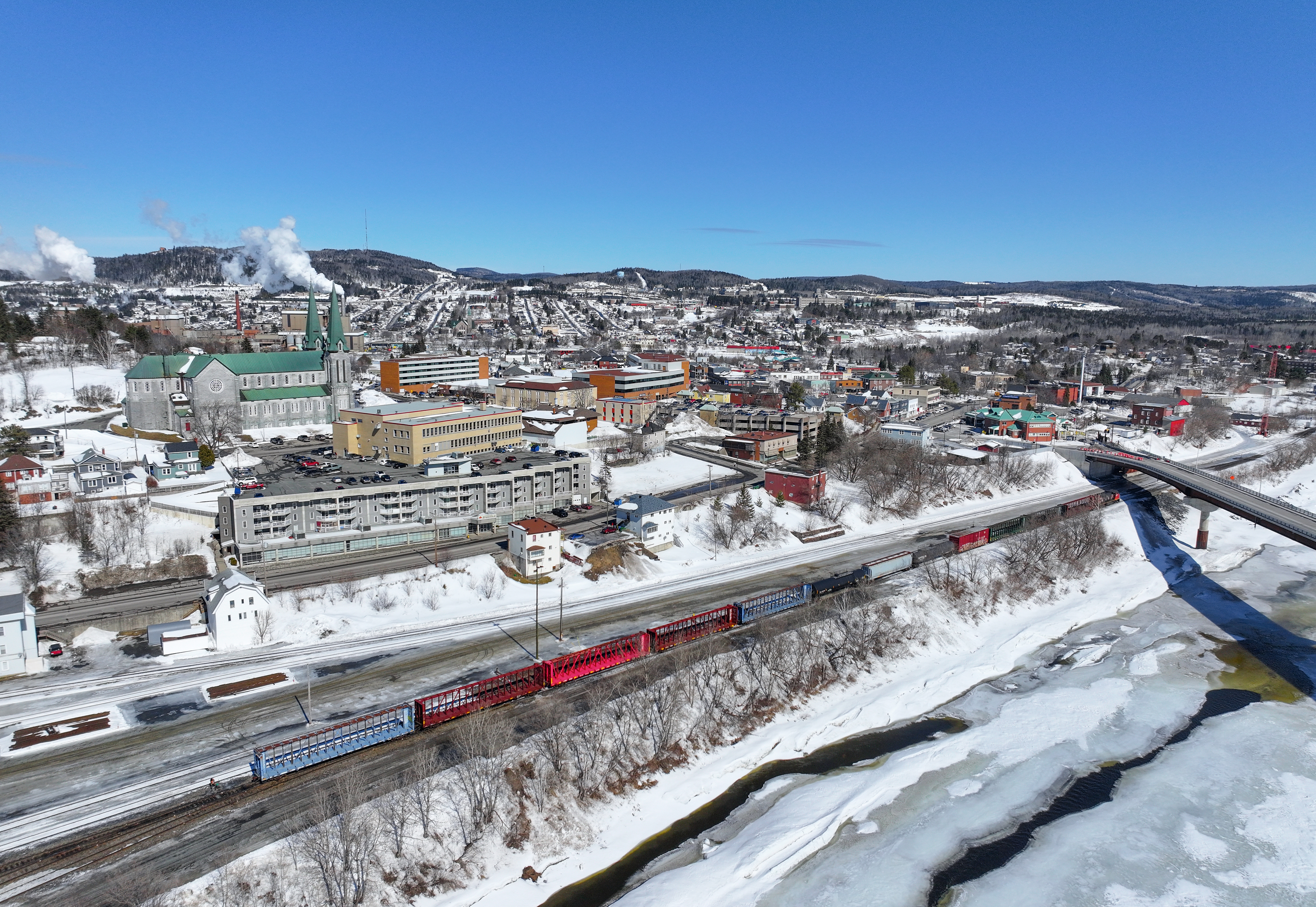
Edmundston in the winter

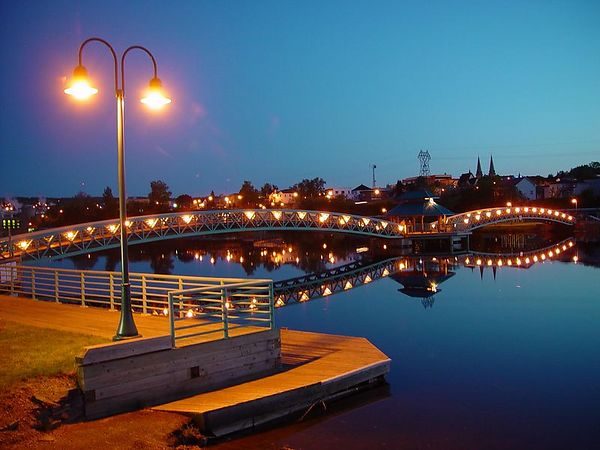
Park and bridge over the Madawaska River

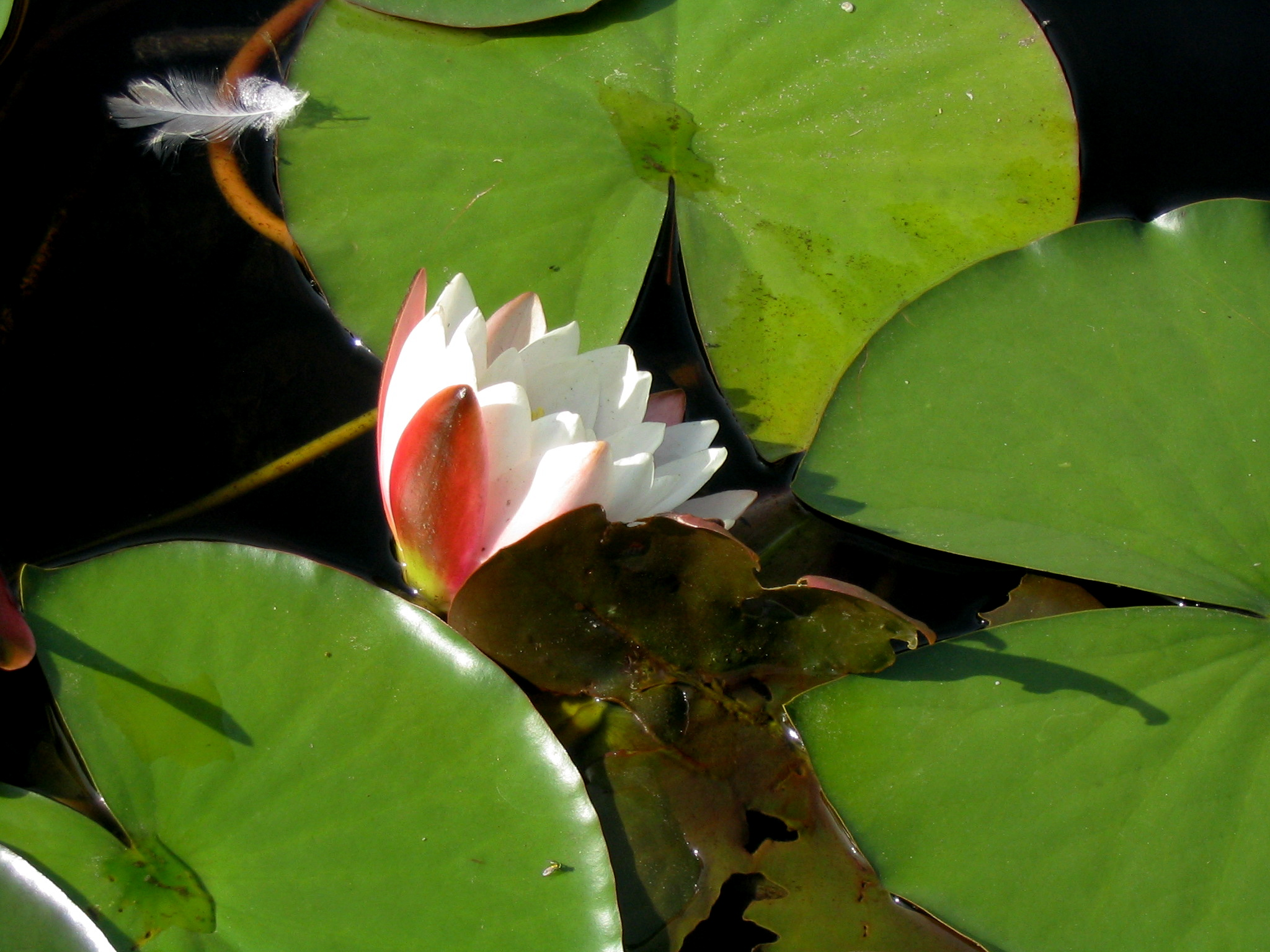
A specimen of Nymphaeaceae in the New Brunswick Botanical Garden.

Edmundston hosts two provincial historical sites:

- Cathedral of Immaculate Conception: Built in 1924, the cathedral's architecture is said to be a synthesis of Roman and Gothic styles. Its granite facade has been recently restored, and can accommodate more than 1,200 people.
- Fortin du Petit-Sault: Erected at the culmination of the boundary disputes between the United States of America and British North America (an international conflict known as Aroostook War) in 1841 prior to the signing of the Webster-Ashburton Treaty. This small fort was rebuilt in 2000.

Other tourist attractions include de la République Provincial Park, an 18-hole golf course, a pedestrian downtown with a number of retail stores, restaurants, a hotel and a convention centre. You can also visit the Antique Automobile Museum, the Madawaska Historic Museum, and many other museums.

The New Brunswick Botanical Garden is in suburban Saint-Jacques, on seven hectares with more than 80,000 plants.

Edmundston has a downhill skiing facility in the city at Mont Farlagne. This facility has 3 lifts, a t-bar, a double chair, and a quad chair. It has 14 trails and an elevation of 690 feet. Snowmaking is available. Five trails are lit for night skiing.

== Sports ==
Since 2017, Edmundston has been home to the Edmundston Blizzard of the Maritime Junior A Hockey League, playing their home games at the Centre Jean Daigle.

== Government ==
The offices of the Member of Parliament for the federal riding of Madawaska—Restigouche René Arseneault and the Member of the Legislative Assembly for the provincial riding of Edmundston-Madawaska Centre (Jean-Claude D'Amours) are located in downtown Edmundston and for the provincial riding of Madawaska Les Lacs-Edmundston (Francine Landry) are located in Edmundston.

== Policing ==
Edmunston Police has 34 sworn members (2012) and are based out of one location.

== Transportation infrastructure ==
Edmundston is served by New Brunswick Route 2, a four-lane all weather divided highway and, on the other side of the Saint John River, by U.S. Route 1. There is a municipal airport 17 kilometres north of Edmundston which serves general aviation traffic. The Trans Canada Trail passes through Edmundston, having been converted for pedestrian and bicycling use after abandonment of the New Brunswick Railway.

== Education ==
The city has four francophone K-8 schools, an anglophone K-12 school, a francophone high school, a community college campus affiliated with the Collège communautaire du Nouveau-Brunswick, and a university campus affiliated with the Université de Moncton.

== Media ==
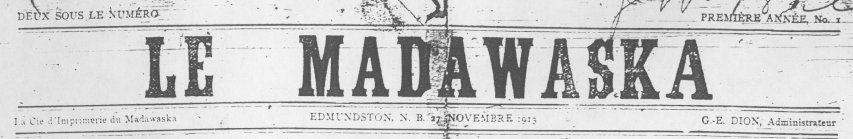
First number of Edmundston's native newspaper, Le Madawaska, authored by Albert-M. Sormany & Maximilien-D. Cormier. Dated 27 November 1913.

Edmundston is served by three newspapers: L'Acadie Nouvelle, The Telegraph Journal and Info Weekend), two local radio stations (CJEM-FM, CFAI-FM), two television rebroadcasters (CFTF-DT-1, CIMT-DT-1) and a regional bureau of Radio-Canada.

The area also receives the Quebec City-based newspapers Le Journal de Québec and Le Soleil which will cover notable events in the region.

Notable people

== See also ==
- List of communities in New Brunswick
- List of paper mills
