= List of cities in New Brunswick =

Location of New Brunswick in Canada

New Brunswick is one of the three Maritime provinces located within Eastern Canada. According to the 2021 Canadian census, it is the eighth most populous province in Canada with 775,610 inhabitants, and the third smallest by land area, covering 71,248.5 square kilometres (27,509.2 sq mi). Following the 2023 local governance reform, the number of municipalities in New Brunswick was reduced from 104 to 77, out of which eight are categorized as cities. While the number of cities remained the same before and post-reform, nearly all cities saw nearby areas amalgamate into them. Because this happened after the 2021 census, updated data will be not be officially recorded by Statistics Canada until the next Canadian census in 2026.

Cities, towns and villages in New Brunswick are referred to as municipalities and all are included in local governments in the province, which may be incorporated under the Local Governance Act of 2017. To incorporate a city in New Brunswick, an area needs to have a minimum of 10,000 residents. Although Campbellton's population falls below this threshold, it is still categorized as a city due to being incorporated prior to January 1, 1967. Each city in New Brunswick, with the exception of Miramichi, has wards in its municipal governments. Additionally, Bathurst has a "hybrid" council type, containing seven seats for general councillors and two for ward councillors.

The largest city by population in New Brunswick is Moncton with 79,470 residents, and the smallest is Campbellton with 7,049 residents. Campbellton is also the smallest city by land area, spanning 18.57 square kilometres (7.17 sq mi), while Saint John is the largest at 315.59 square kilometres (121.85 sq mi). Additionally, Saint John was the first incorporated city in the future New Brunswick and Canada overall with its charter being signed on May 18, 1785. The most recent incorporated city in the province was Dieppe, on January 1, 2003. Fredericton is the capital city of New Brunswick.

== List ==
Largest cities in New Brunswick by population

Moncton, New Brunswick's largest city by population

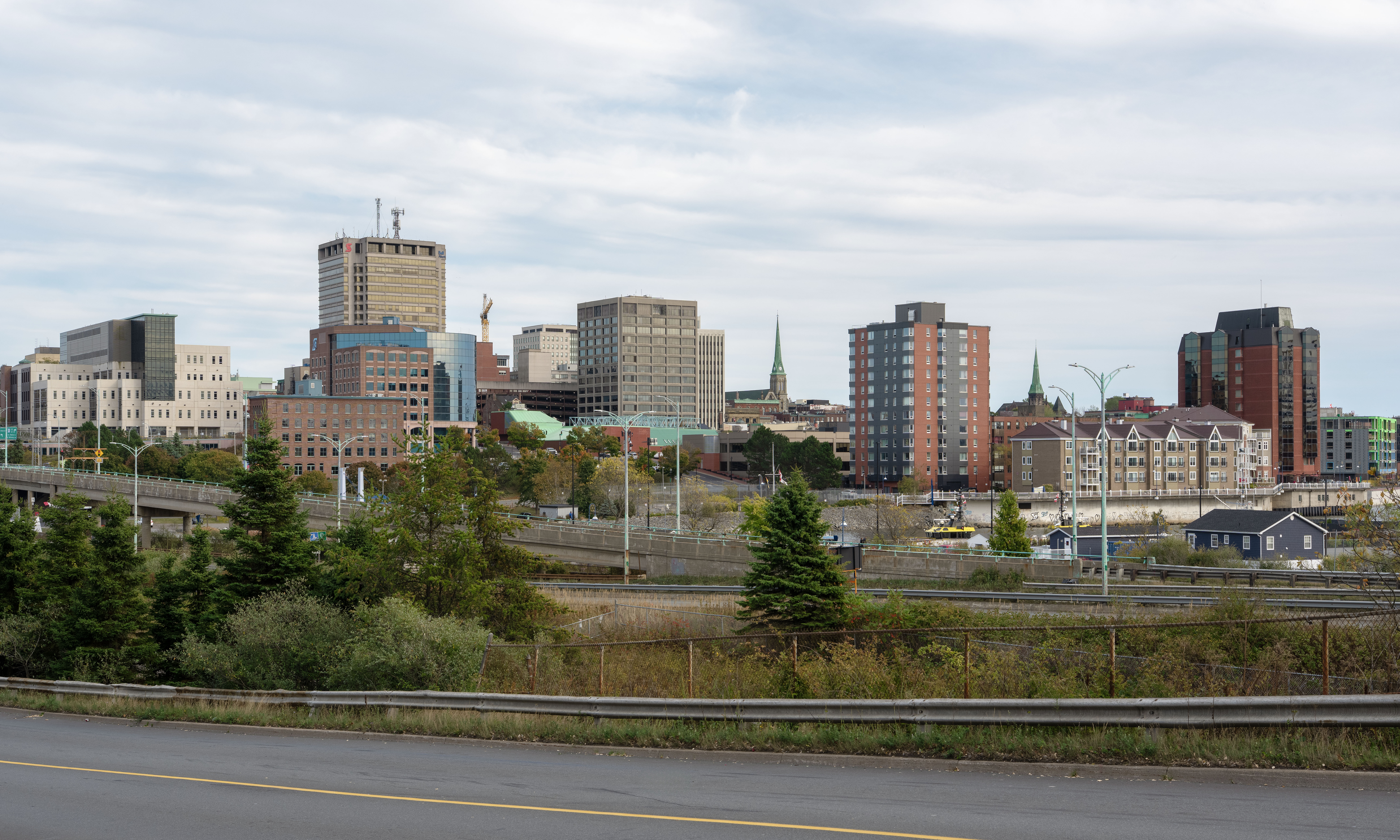
Skyline view of Saint John, second most populous city in New Brunswick

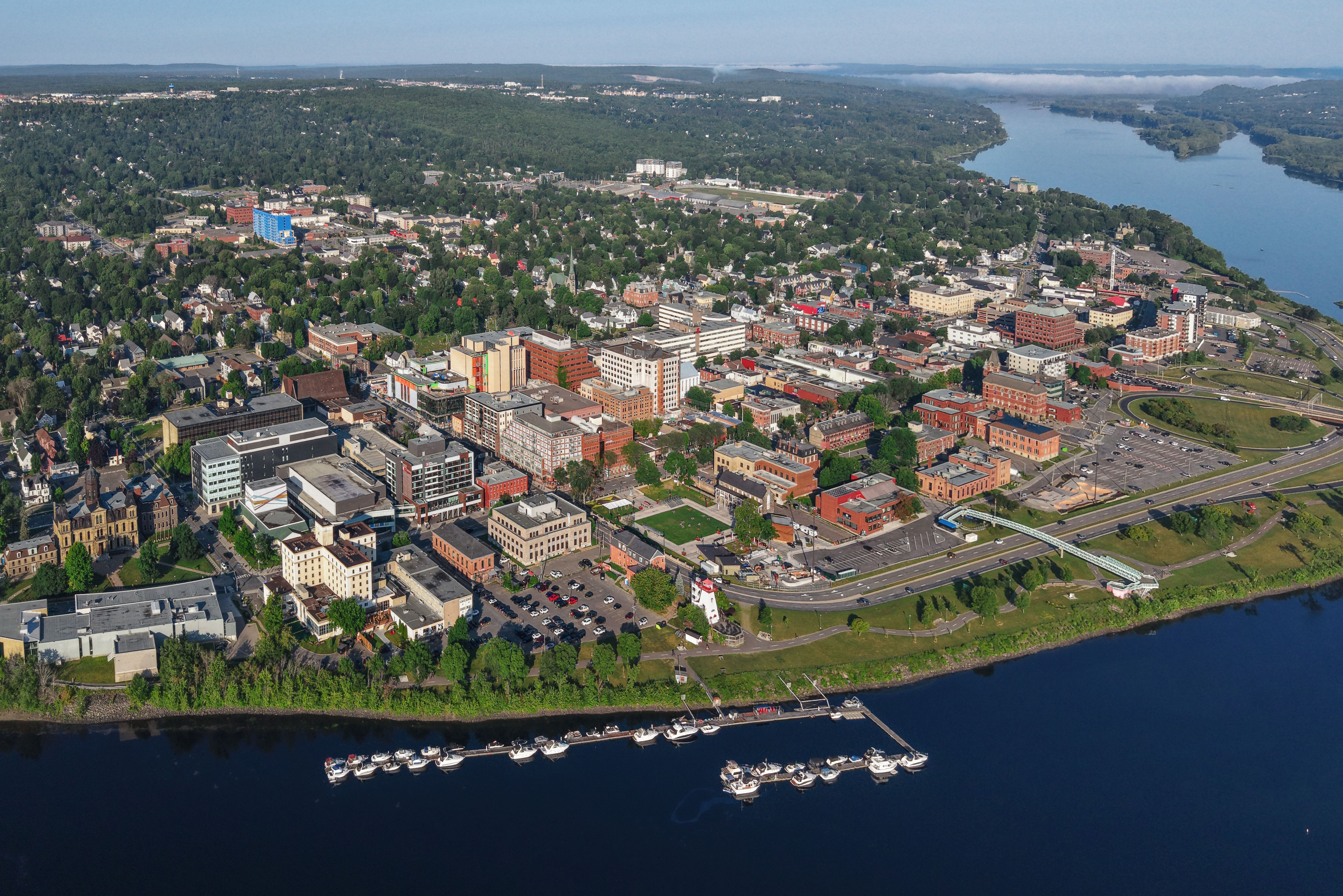
Skyline of Fredericton, New Brunswick's capital and third largest city by population

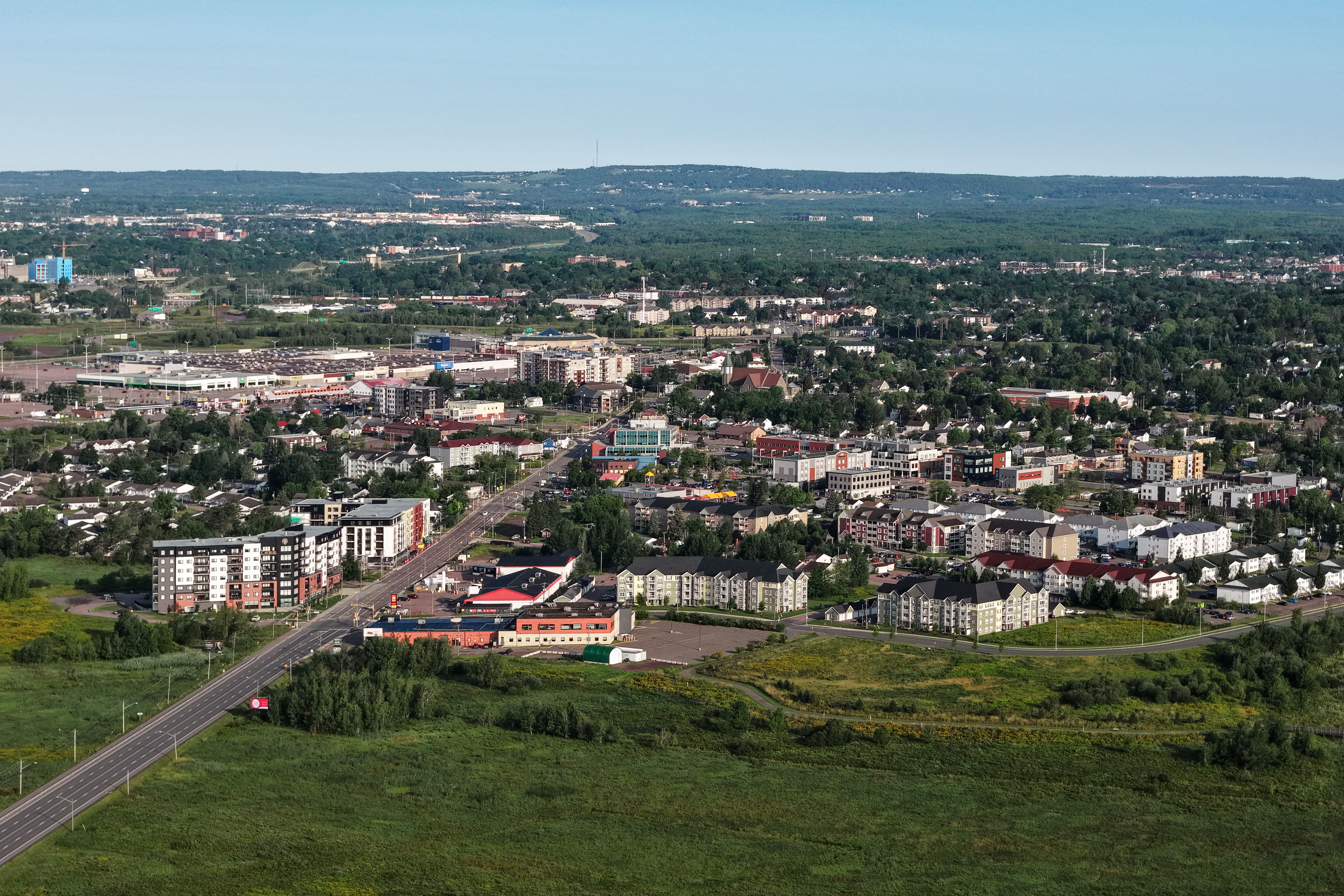
Dieppe, fourth most populous city in New Brunswick

Cities in New Brunswick
Name	County	Incorporation date	Council type	Council size	2021 Census of Population				
Name	County	Incorporation date	Council type	Council size	Population (2021)	Population (2016)	Change	Land area (km^{2})	Population density
Bathurst	Gloucester	January 1, 1966	Hybrid (Note: Bathurst is described as having a "hybrid" council type, containing both councillor and councillor ward seats.)	9	12,157	11,897	+2.2%	91.62	132.7/km^{2}
Campbellton	Restigouche	January 1, 1958	Ward	10	7,047	6,883	+2.4%	18.57	379.5/km^{2}
Dieppe	Westmorland	January 1, 2003	Ward	8	28,114	25,384	+10.8%	77.02	365.0/km^{2}
Edmundston	Madawaska	April 29, 1952	Ward	10	16,437	16,580	−0.9%	106.84	153.8/km^{2}
Fredericton	Sunbury & York	March 30, 1848	Ward	12	63,116	58,721	+7.5%	133.93	471.3/km^{2}
Miramichi	Northumberland	January 1, 1995	At-large	8	17,692	17,537	+0.9%	178.98	98.8/km^{2}
Moncton	Westmorland	April 23, 1890	Ward	10	79,470	71,889	+10.5%	140.67	564.9/km^{2}
Saint John	Saint John	May 18, 1785	Ward	10	69,895	67,575	+3.4%	315.59	221.5/km^{2}
Total cities					293,928	276,466	+6.3%	1,063.22	276.5/km^{2}
New Brunswick					775,610	747,101	+3.8%	71,248.5	10.9/km^{2}

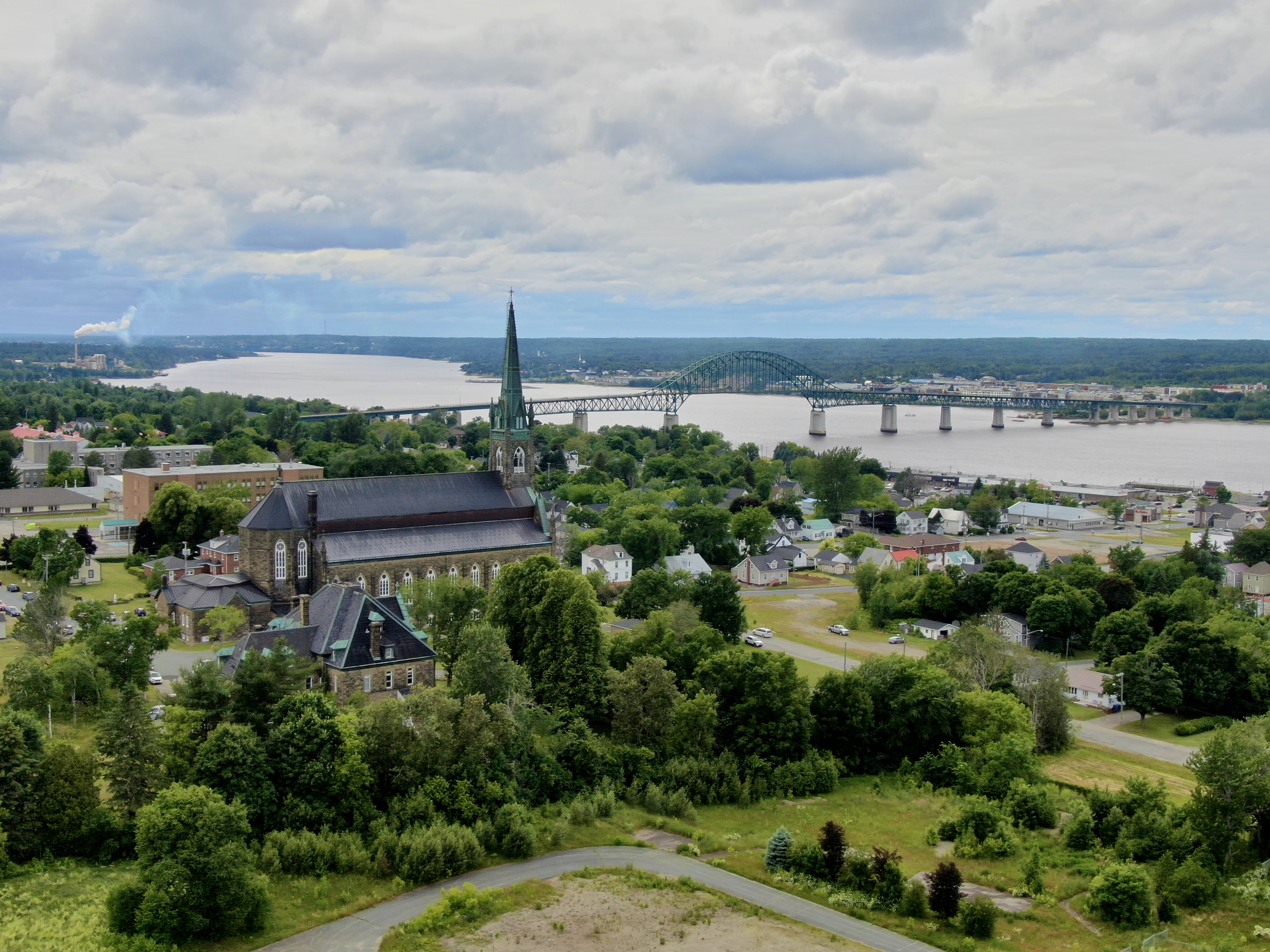
Aerial view of Miramichi, New Brunswick's fifth most populous city

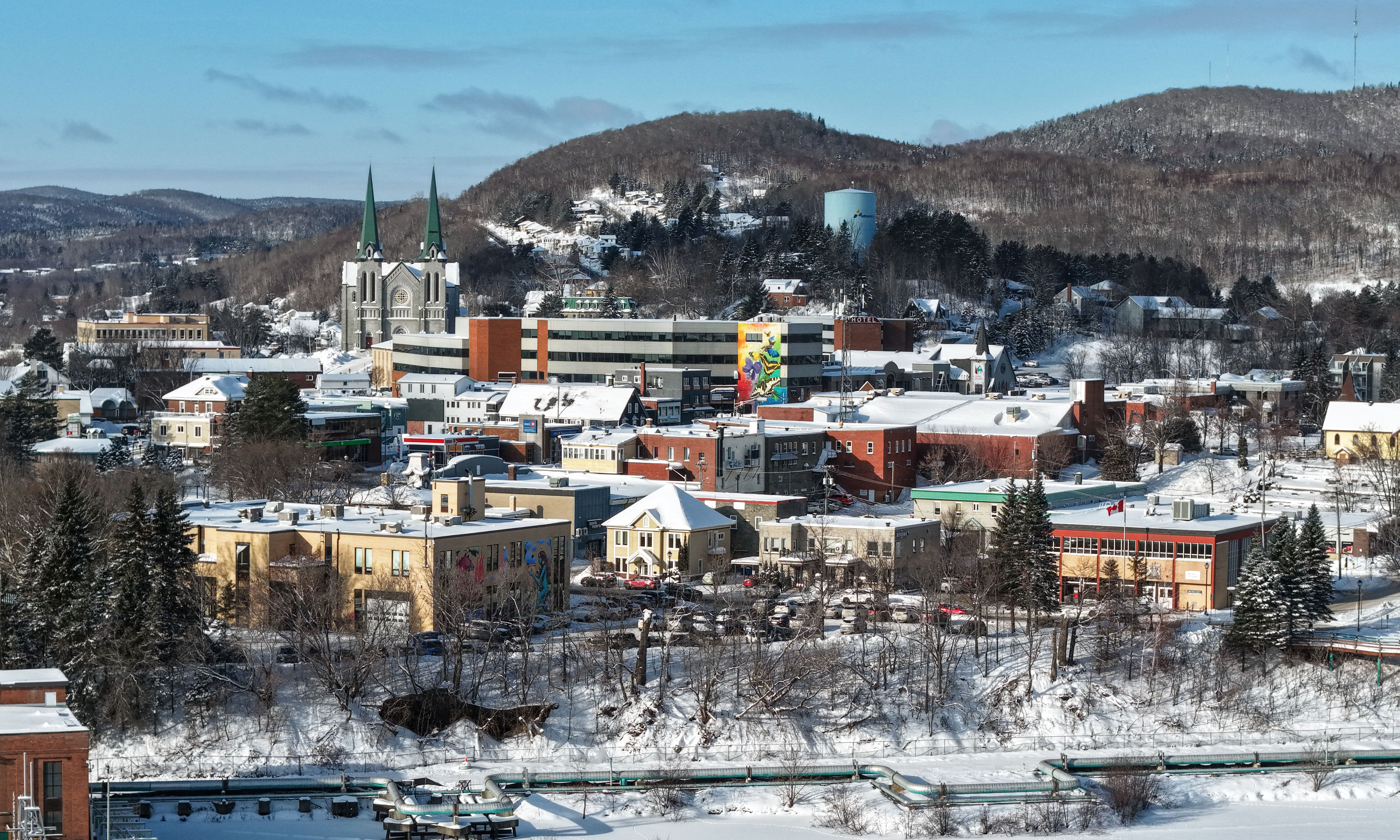
Skyline of Edmundston, sixth most populous city in New Brunswick

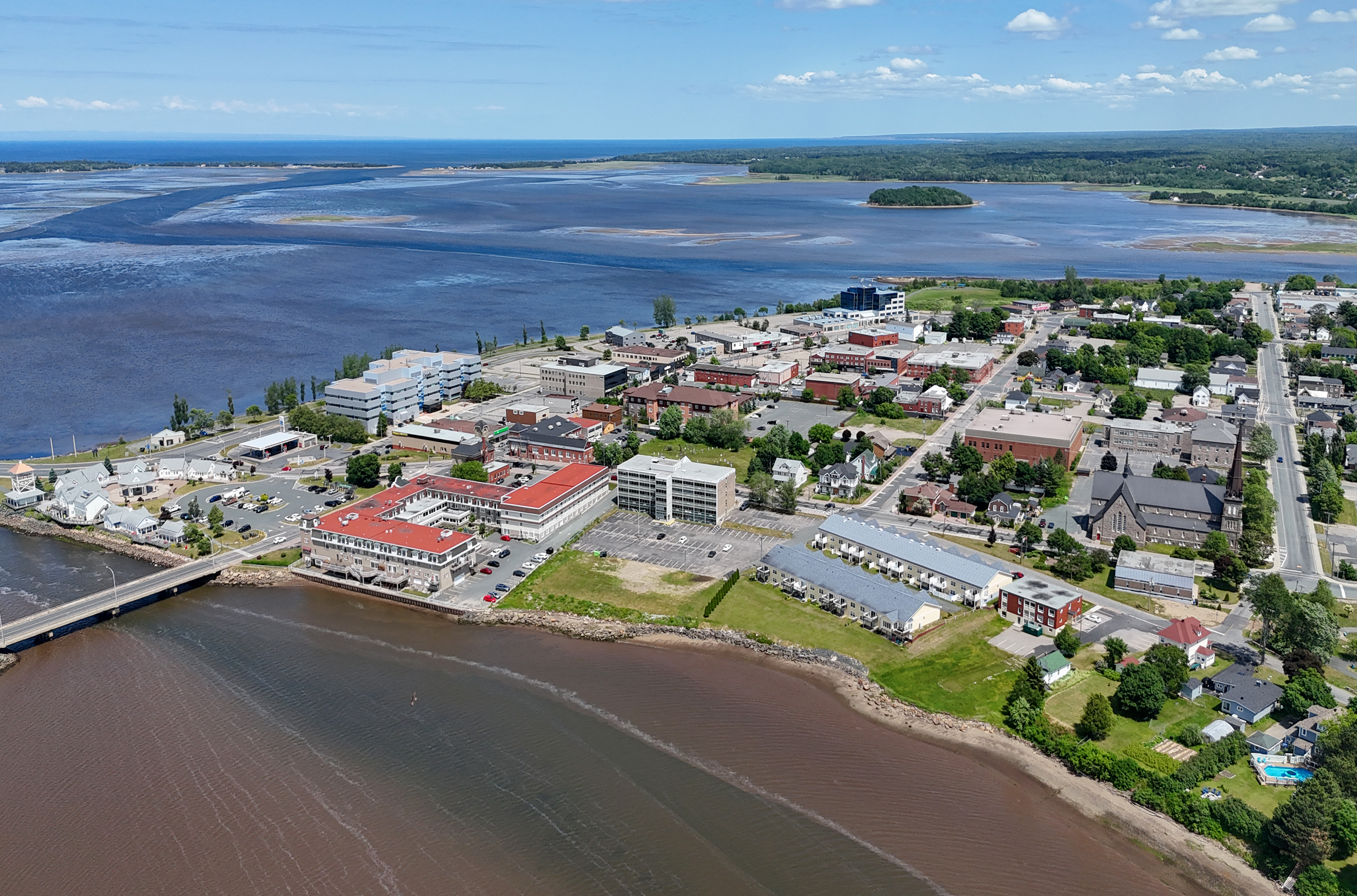
Aerial view of Bathurst, New Brunswick's second least populous city

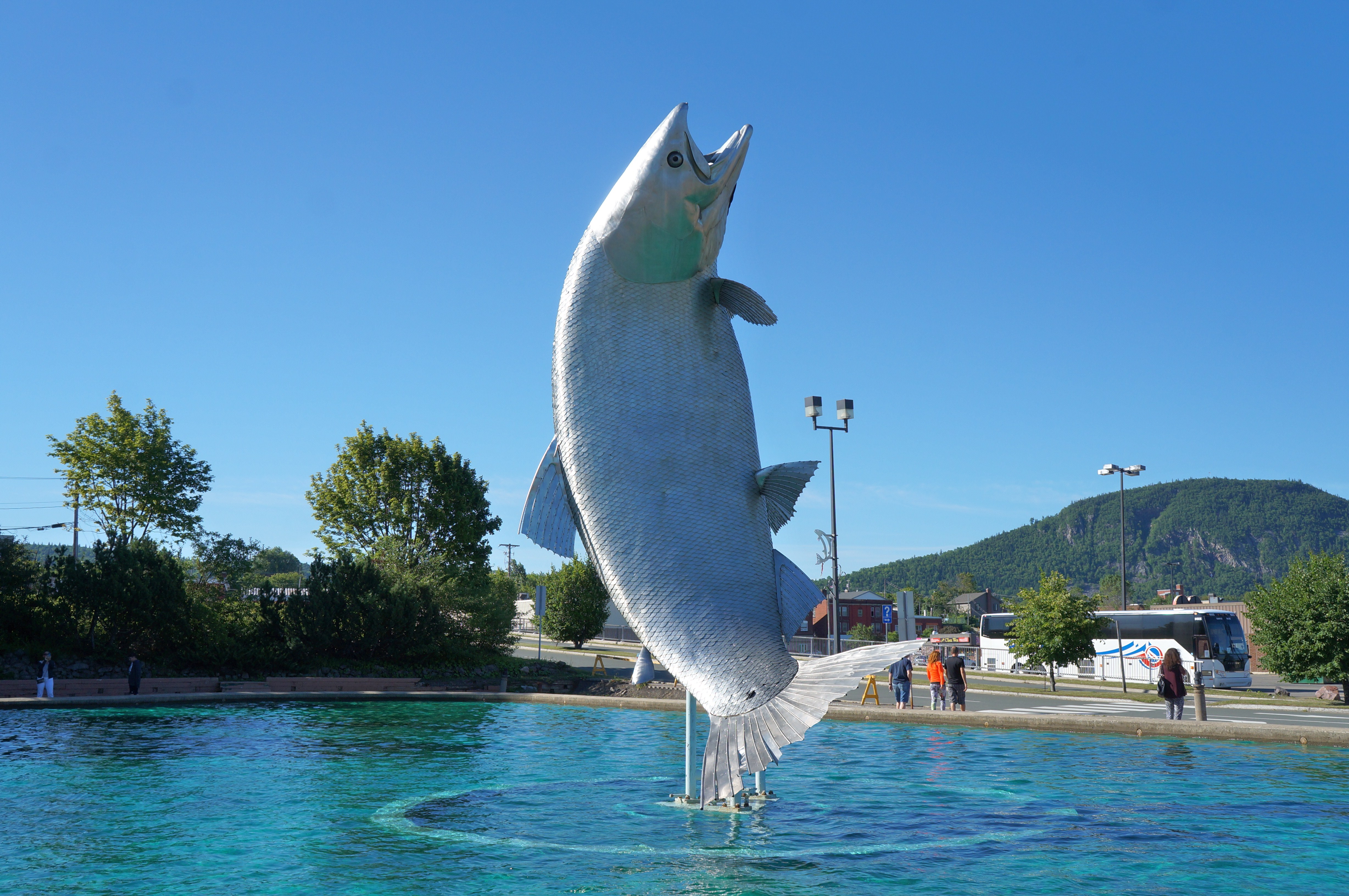
Restigouche Sam in Campbellton, New Brunswick's least populous city, and Sugarloaf Mountain

== See also ==
- Lancaster, New Brunswick, a former city in New Brunswick
- List of counties of New Brunswick
- List of municipalities in New Brunswick
- Portland, New Brunswick, a former city in New Brunswick
