= U.S. Route 1 =

North–south U.S. route from Florida to Maine

U.S. Route 1
- US 1 highlighted in red

Route information
- Length: 2,369.49 mi (3,813.32 km)
- Existed: November 11, 1926–present

Major junctions
- South end: Fleming Street in Key West, FL
- I-95 in Miami, FL; I-20 near Aiken, SC; I-77 in Columbia, SC; I-40 in Raleigh, NC; I-85 / US 460 near Petersburg, VA; I-64 / I-95 in Richmond, VA; I-83 in Baltimore, MD; I-76 in Philadelphia, PA; I-87 in New York, NY; I-90 / I-93 in Boston, MA
- North end: Route 161 / Route 205 at the Fort Kent–Clair Border Crossing in Fort Kent, ME

Location
- Country: United States
- States: Florida, Georgia, South Carolina, North Carolina, Virginia, District of Columbia, Maryland, Pennsylvania, New Jersey, New York, Connecticut, Rhode Island, Massachusetts, New Hampshire, Maine

Highway system
- United States Numbered Highway System; List; Special; Divided
← US 425	US	→ US 2
← Route 32A	N.E.	→ Route 1A

U.S. Route 1 or U.S. Highway 1 (US 1) is a major north–south United States Numbered Highway that serves the East Coast of the United States. It runs 2,370 miles (3,810 km) from Key West, Florida, north to Fort Kent, Maine, at the Canadian border, making it the longest north–south road in the United States. US 1 is generally paralleled by Interstate 95 (I-95), though US 1 is significantly farther west and inland between Jacksonville, Florida, and Petersburg, Virginia, while I-95 is closer to the coastline. In contrast, US 1 in Maine is much closer to the coast than I-95, which runs farther inland than US 1. The route connects most of the major cities of the East Coast from the Southeastern United States to New England, including Miami, Jacksonville, Augusta, Columbia, Raleigh, Richmond, Washington, D.C., Baltimore, Philadelphia, Newark, New York City, New Haven, Providence, Boston, and Portland.

While US 1 is generally the easternmost of the main north–south U.S. Routes, parts of several others occupy corridors closer to the ocean. When the road system was laid out in the 1920s, US 1 was mostly assigned to the existing Atlantic Highway, which followed the Atlantic Seaboard Fall Line between the Piedmont and the Atlantic Plain north of Augusta, Georgia. At the time, the highways farther east were of lower quality and did not serve the major population centers. From Henderson, North Carolina, to Petersburg, Virginia, it is paralleled by I-85. Construction of the Interstate Highway System gradually changed the use and character of US 1, and I-95 became the major north–south East Coast highway by the late 1960s.

== Route description ==
Lengths
	mi	km
FL	545	877
GA	223	359
SC	171	275
NC	174	280
VA	197	317
DC	7	11
MD	81	130
PA	81	130
NJ	66	106
NY	22	35
CT	117	188
RI	57	92
MA	86	138
NH	17	27
ME	526	847
Total	2,369	3,813

A US 1 shield used in Florida prior to 1993

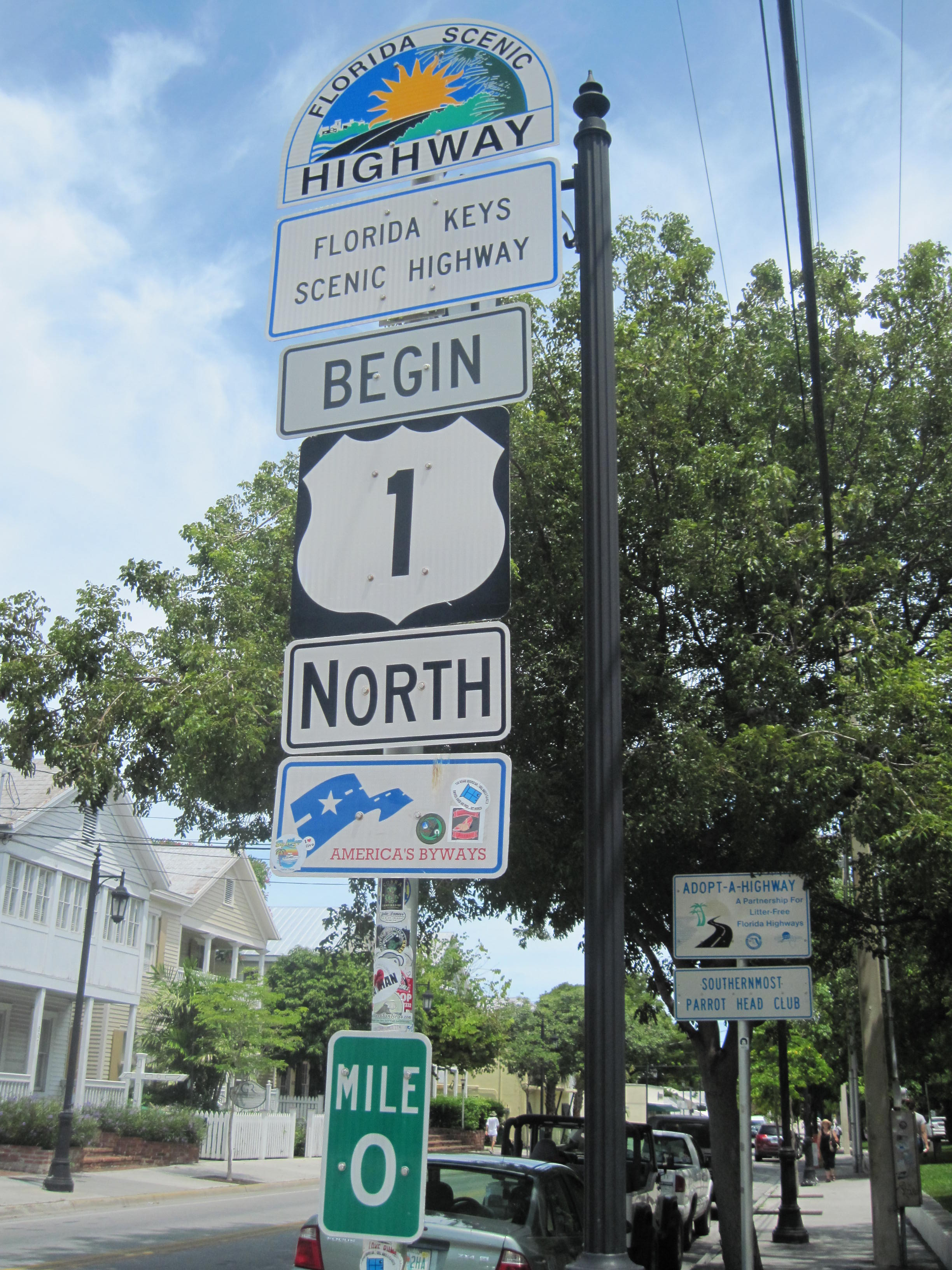
Mile 0, Key West, Florida

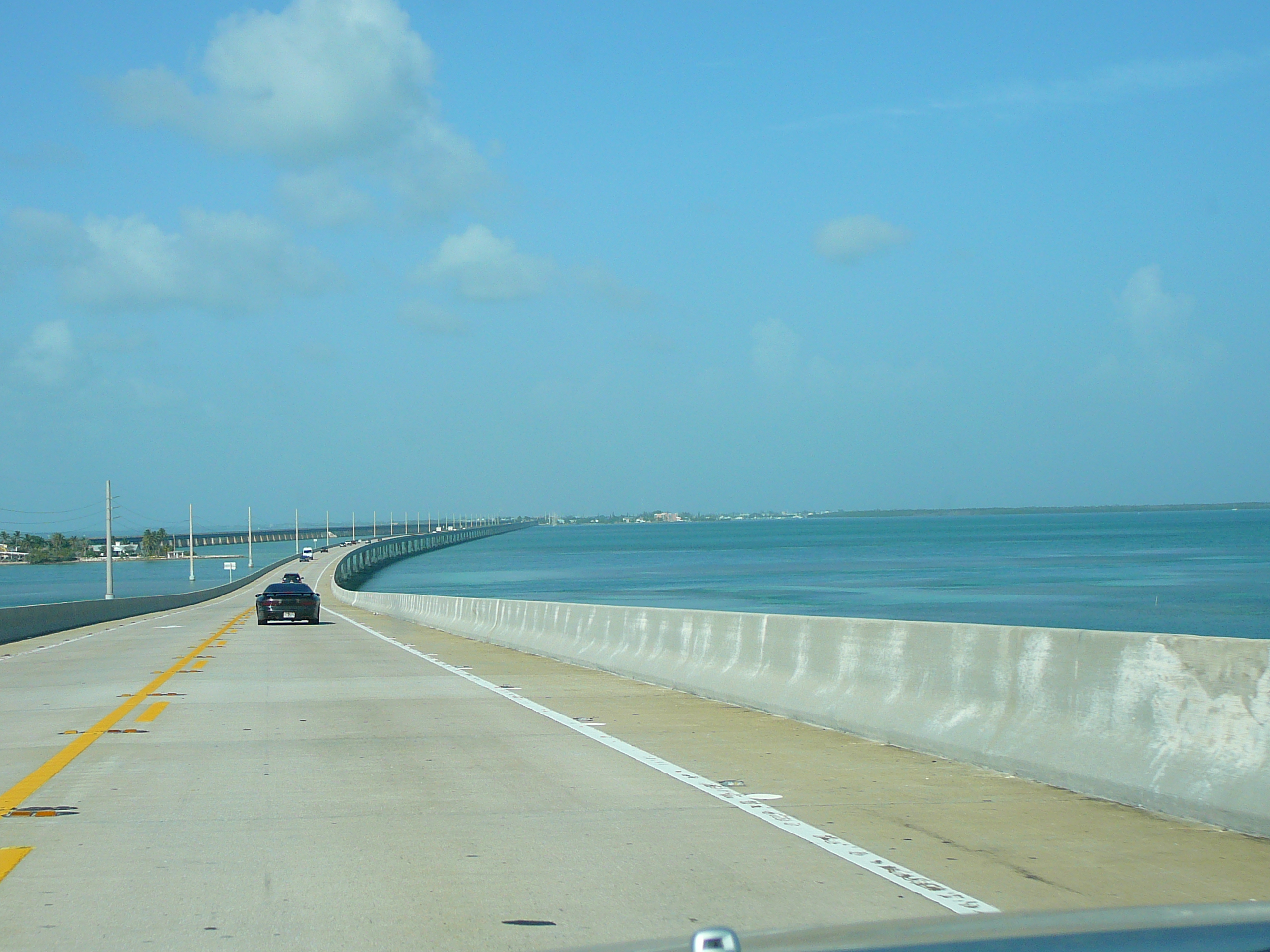
US 1 crossing Moser Channel along the Overseas Highway, Florida Keys

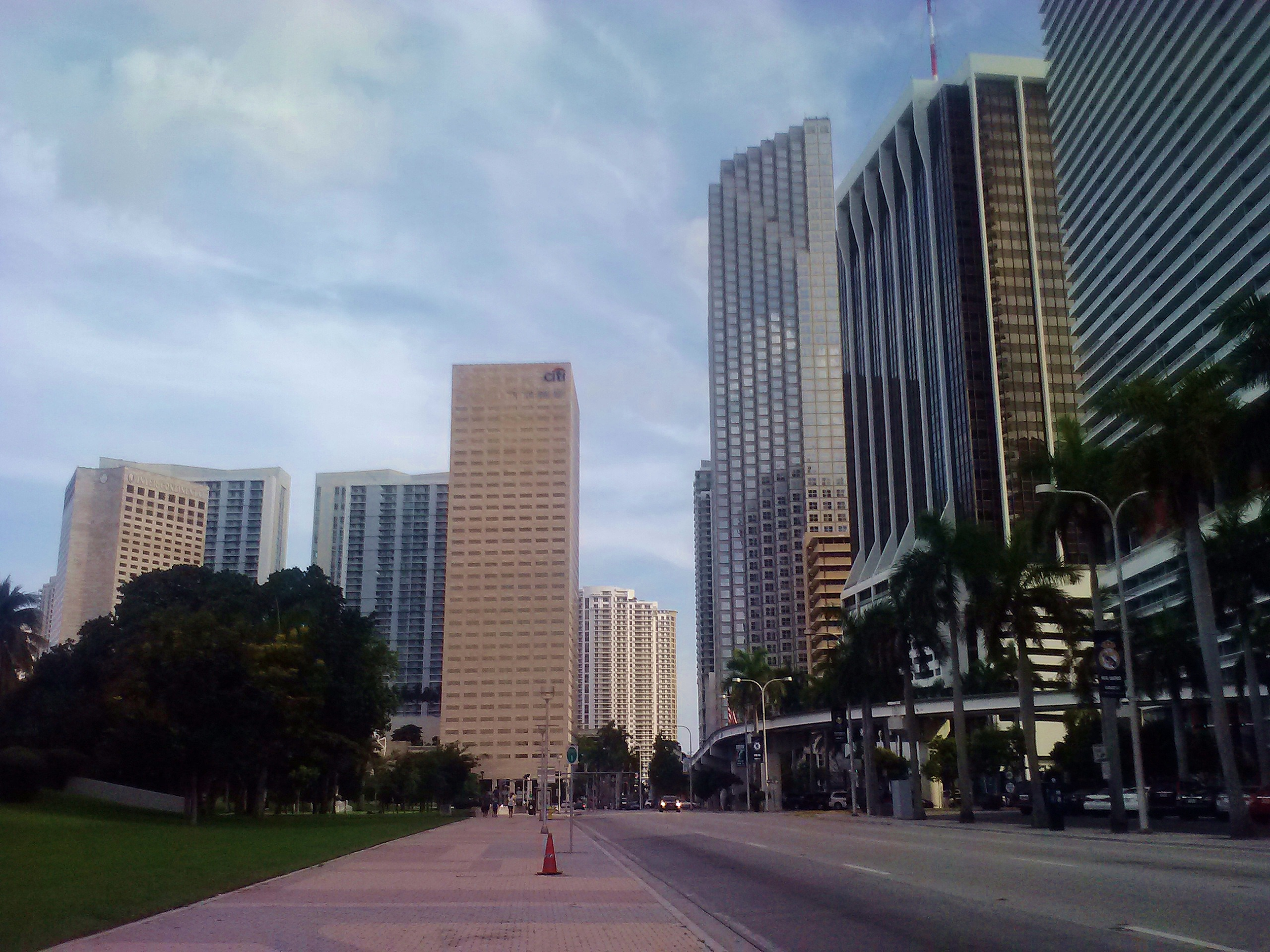
US 1 along Biscayne Boulevard in downtown Miami, Florida

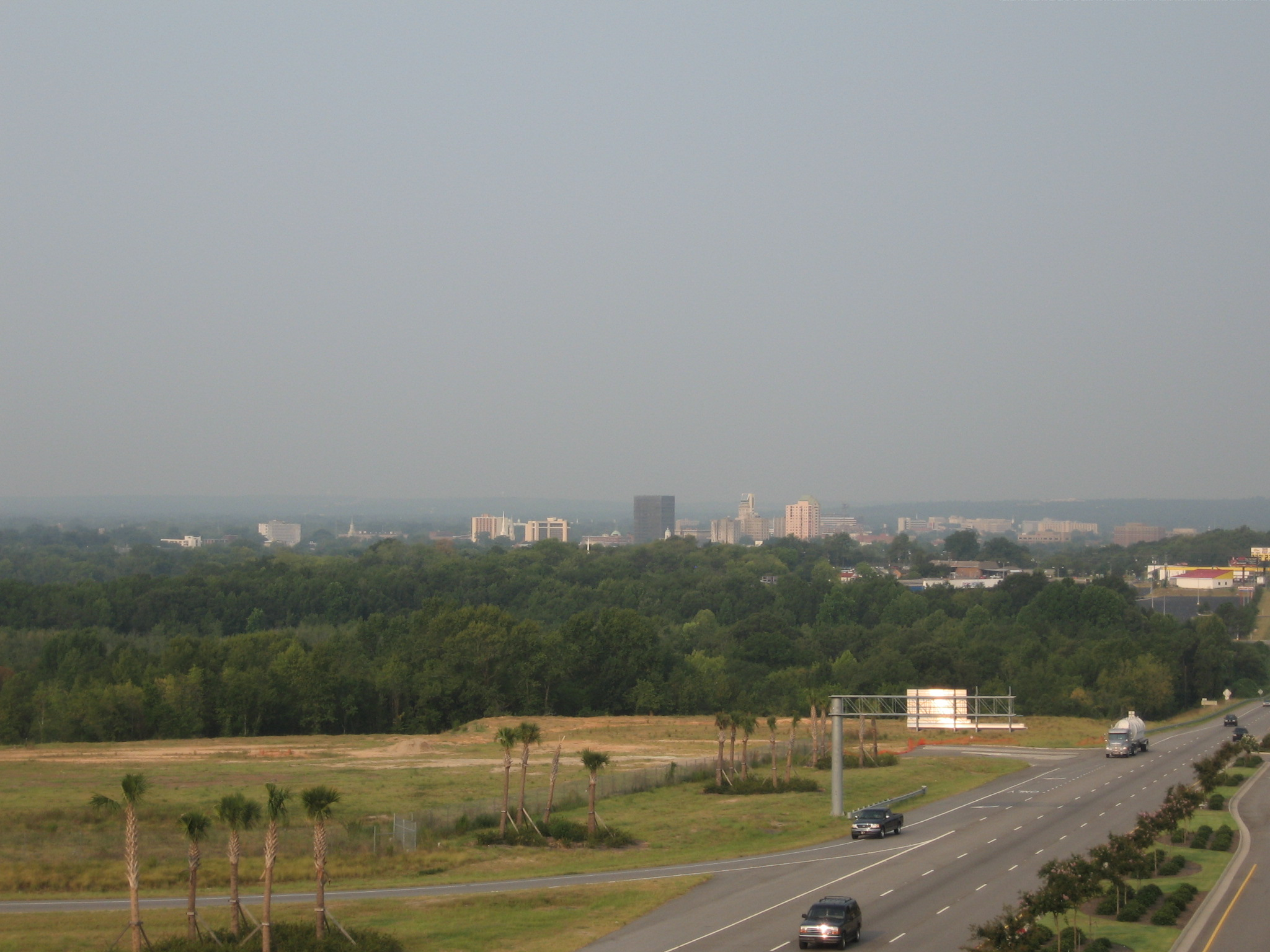
Skyline of Augusta, Georgia, as seen from US 1 in North Augusta near I-520

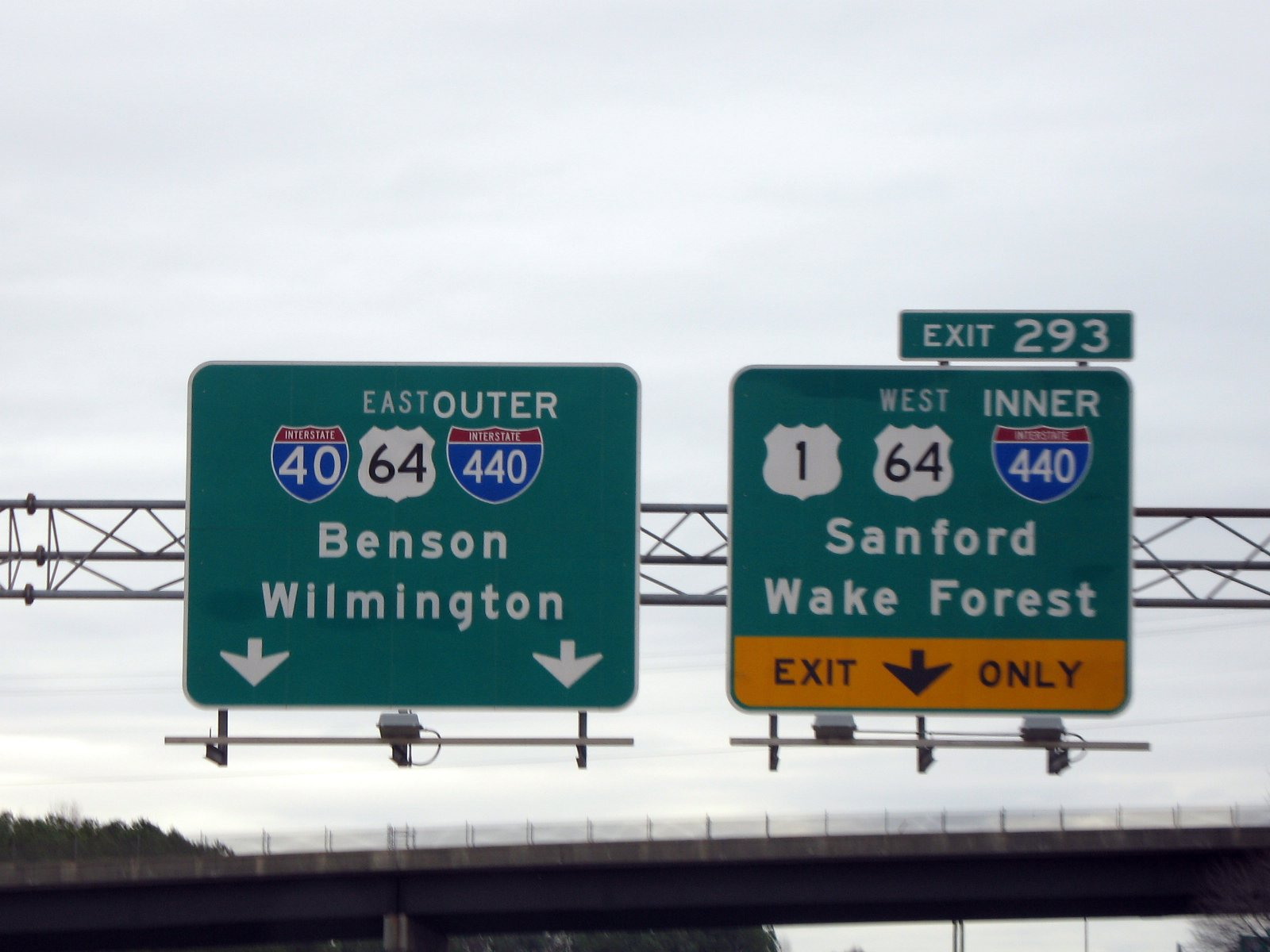
I-40 east approaching the Raleigh Beltline, which includes US 1

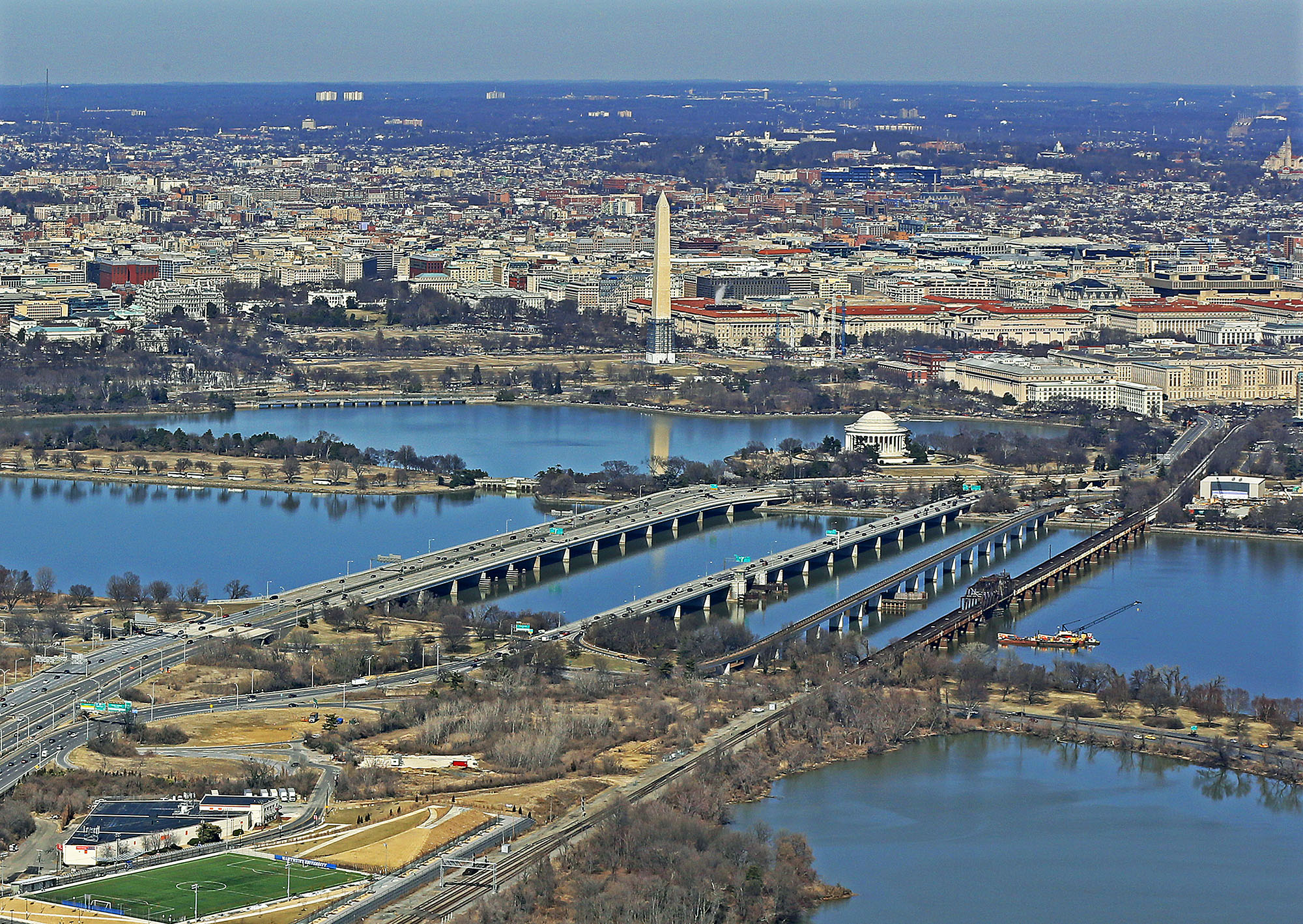
US 1 going over the left-most of the 14th Street bridges, Washington DC

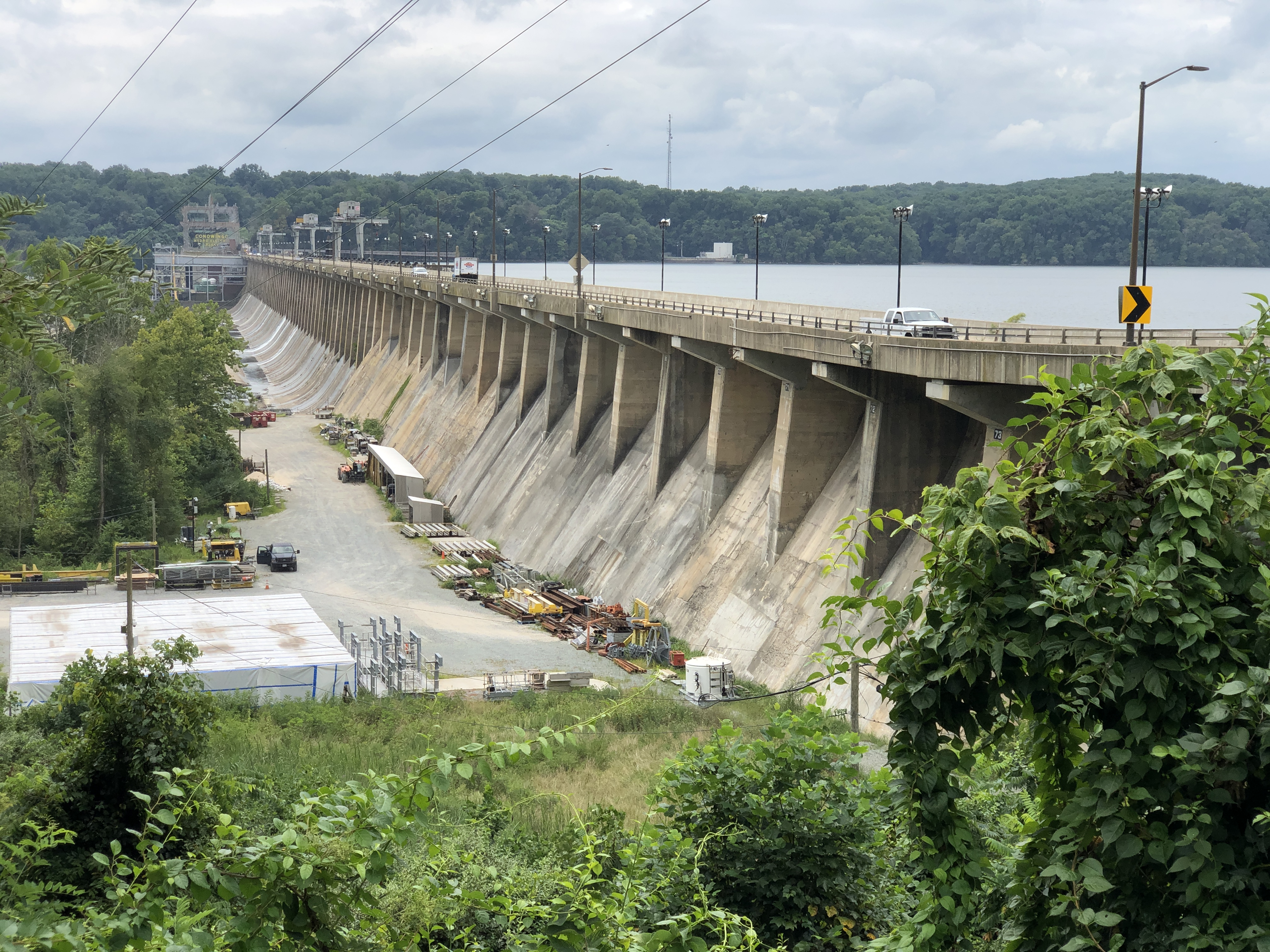
US 1 crossing the Susquehanna River on the Conowingo Dam in Cecil County, Maryland

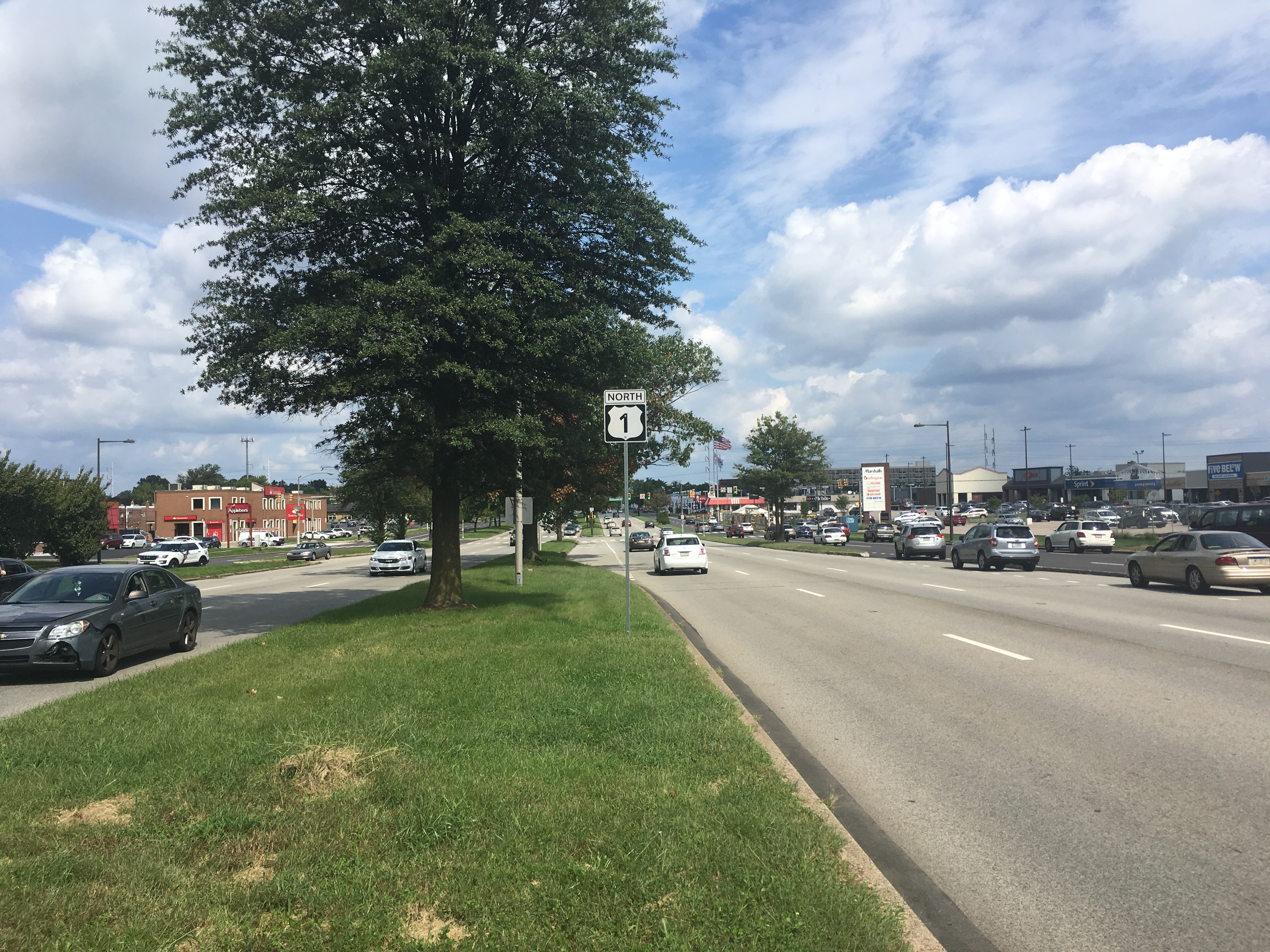
US 1 along Roosevelt Boulevard in Philadelphia, Pennsylvania

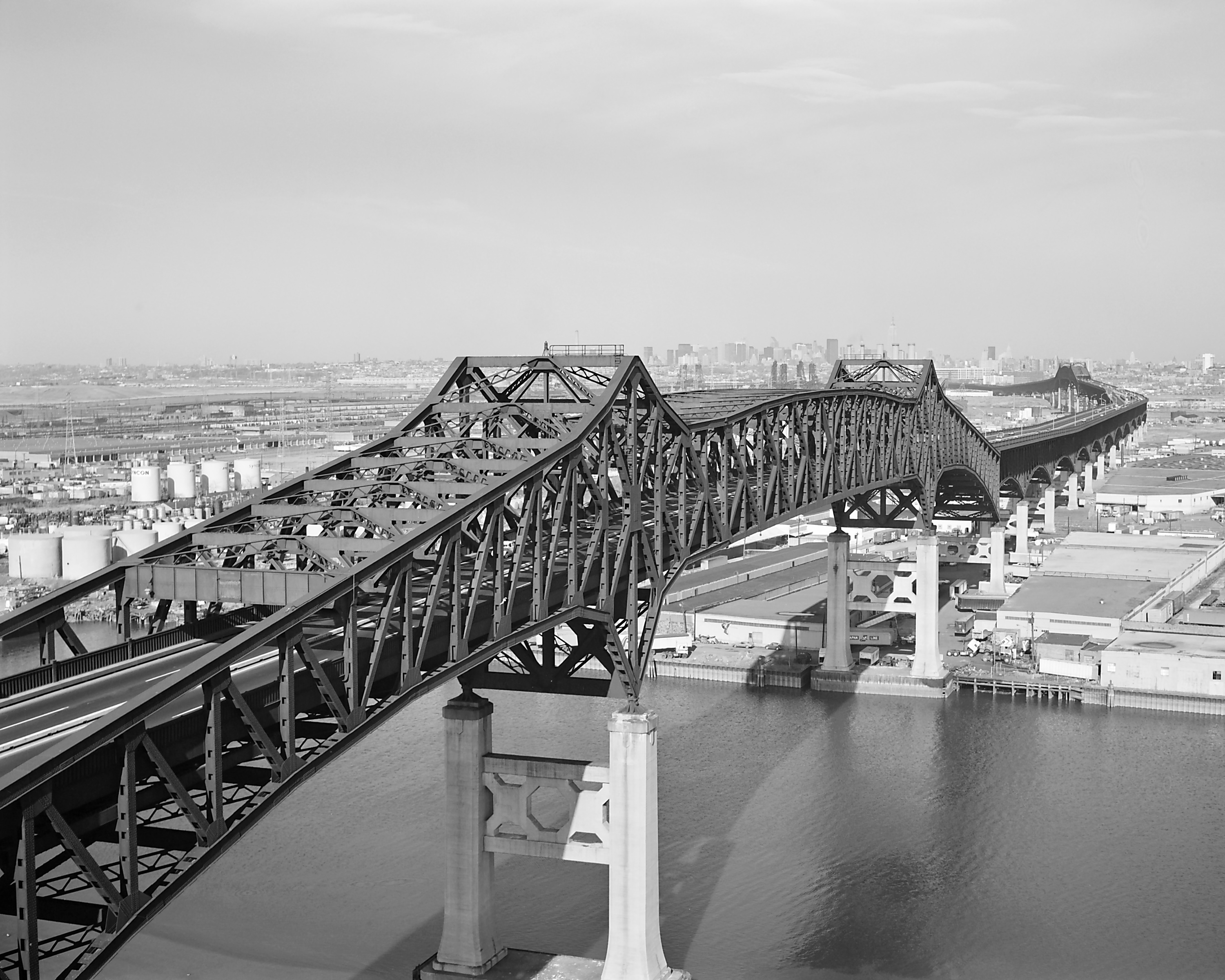
Pulaski Skyway, in Jersey City, Kearny, and Newark, New Jersey

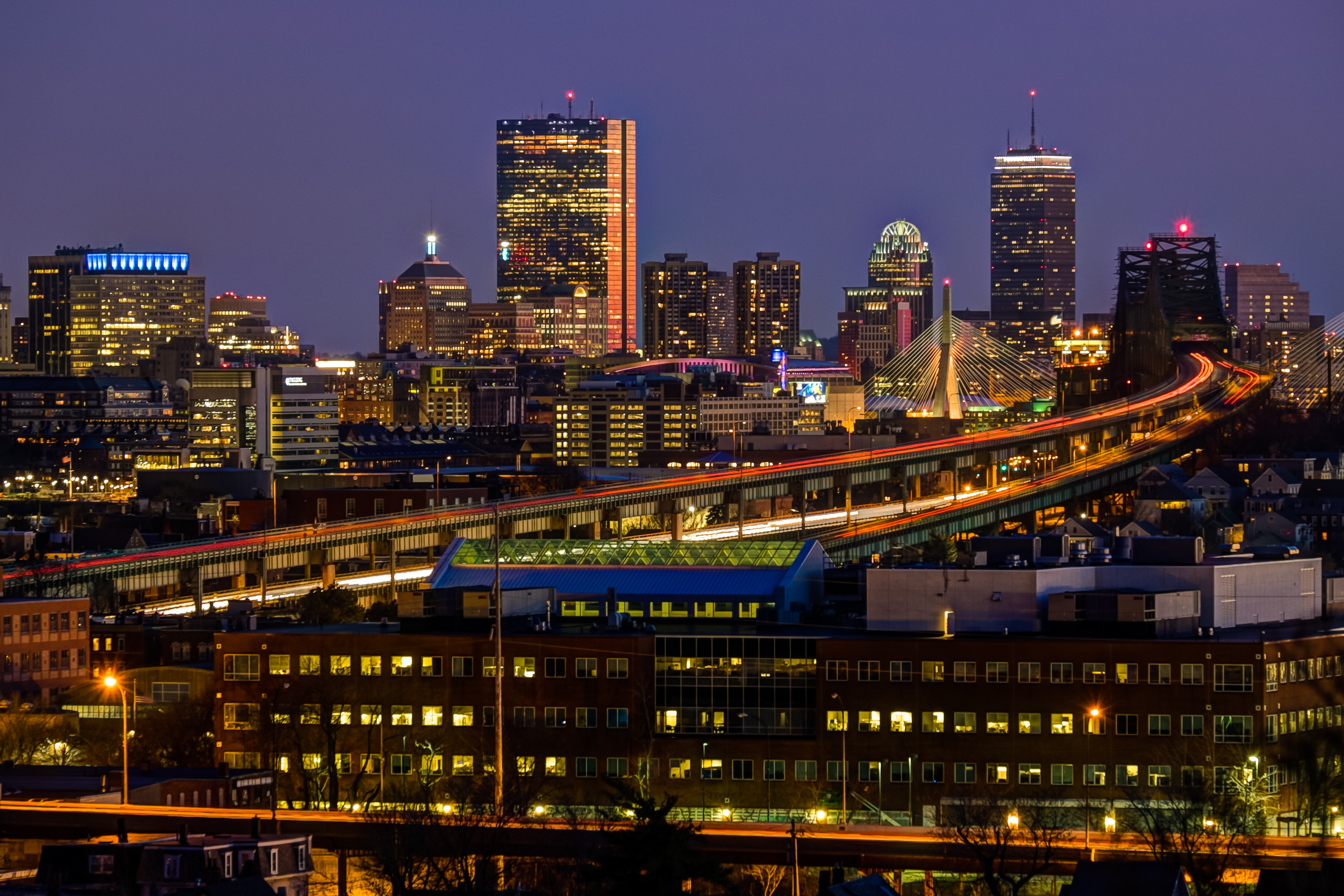
Tobin Bridge with the Boston skyline, as seen from Chelsea, Massachusetts

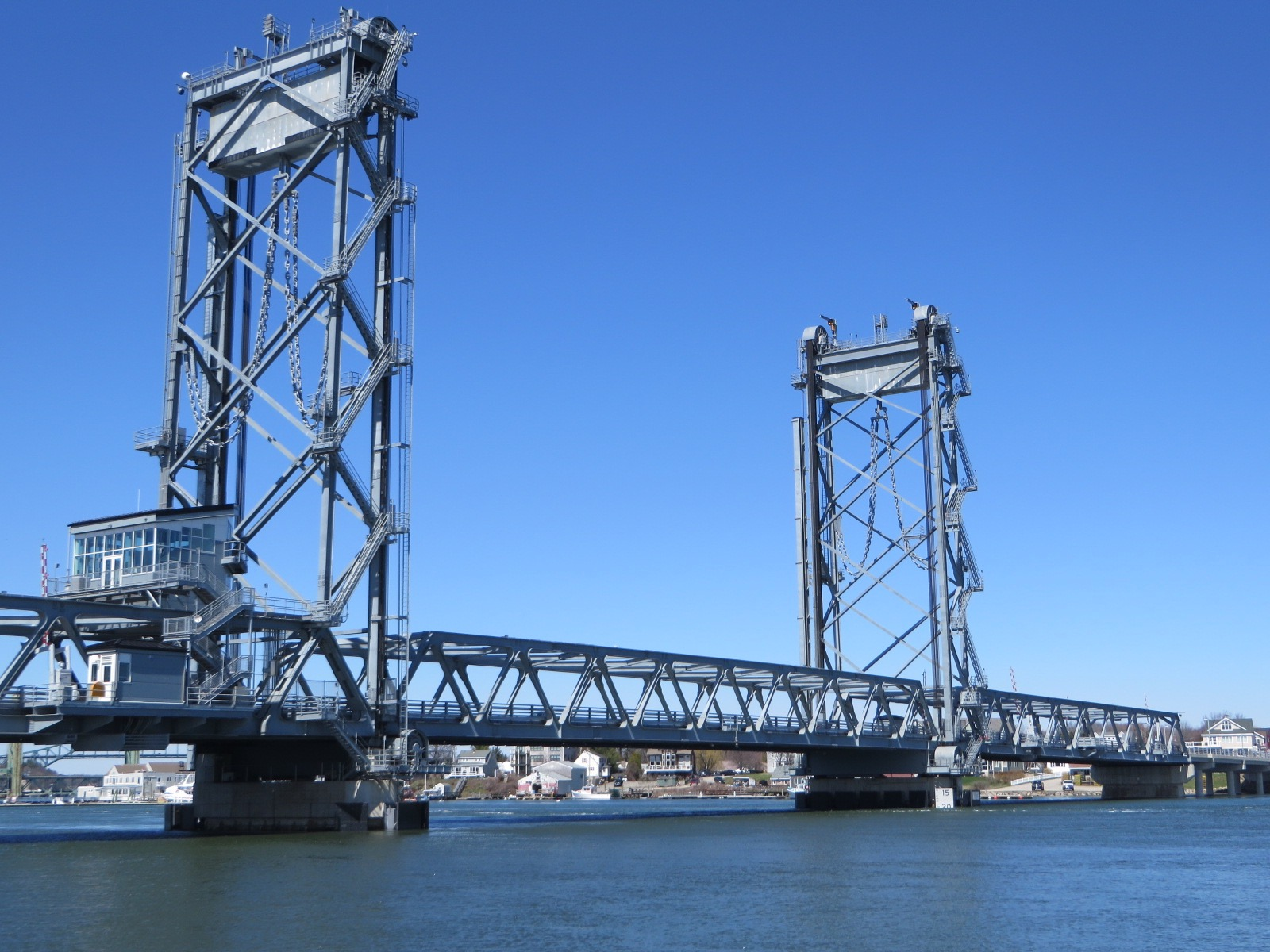
Memorial Bridge between New Hampshire and Maine, 2016

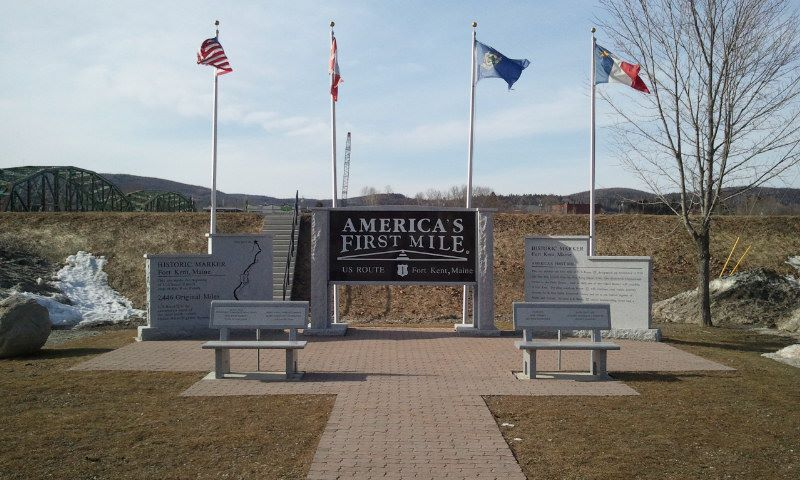
Monument in Fort Kent dedicated to US 1, Fort Kent, Maine

=== Florida ===
US 1 travels along the east coast of Florida, beginning at 490 Whitehead Street in Key West and passing through Miami, Hollywood, Fort Lauderdale, Boca Raton, West Palm Beach, Jupiter, Fort Pierce, Melbourne, Cocoa, Titusville, Daytona Beach, Palm Coast, St. Augustine, and Jacksonville. The southernmost piece through the chain islands of the Florida Keys, about 100 miles (160 km) long, is the two-lane Overseas Highway, originally built in the late 1930s after railroad tycoon Henry Flagler's Florida East Coast Railway's Overseas Railroad, which was built between 1905 and 1912 on stone pillars, was ruined by the 1935 Labor Day hurricane. The rest of US 1 in Florida is generally a four-lane divided highway, despite the existence of the newer I-95 not far away. Famous vacation scenic route State Road A1A is a continuous oceanfront alternate to US 1 that runs along the beaches of the Atlantic Ocean, cut only by assorted unbridged inlets and the Kennedy Space Center at Cape Canaveral. North of Jacksonville, US 1 turns northwest toward Augusta, Georgia; US 17 becomes the coastal route into Virginia, where US 13 takes over. In Florida until the 1990s, US 1 used high-contrast markers (white text on a red background).

=== Georgia ===
The part of US 1 in Georgia, as it shifts from the coastal alignment in Florida to the Atlantic Seaboard Fall Line alignment in South Carolina, is generally very rural, passing through marshes and former plantations between the towns and cities of Folkston, Waycross, Alma, Baxley, Lyons, Swainsboro, and Augusta. The Georgia Department of Transportation has an ongoing plan to widen all of US 1 to four lanes with bypasses, which is more than 50 percent complete.

=== The Carolinas ===
In South Carolina, US 1 generally serves mostly rural areas as it falls west of I-95 while the coastal areas are served by routes east of it. Starting in South Carolina, US 1 is paralleled by I-20 along the Atlantic Seaboard Fall Line through Aiken, Lexington, and Columbia to Camden and Lugoff. US 1 functions as a local two-lane road with occasional boulevard stretches. After Camden, US 1 continues northeast away from any Interstate toward Bethune, Patrick, McBee, and Cheraw with no bypasses or four-lane sections except around Cheraw through the US 52 and South Carolina Highway 9 (SC 9) concurrencies. After SC 9, it continues northward into North Carolina as a two -lane highway. The South Carolina Department of Transportation (SCDOT) has no plans to widen or bypass any US 1 alignments northeast of Camden to the North Carolina line.

Between the South Carolina line and the US 74 bypass, US 1 is a two-lane road but sees a considerable amount of truck and tourist traffic of people cutting through from the US 74/US 220 and I-73/I-74 corridor attempting to reach points south and east. US 1 goes through downtown Rockingham, with a bypass in the future plans. North of the North Carolina Highway 177 (NC 177) junction, it becomes four lanes or greater, becoming a superstreet with limited access and then becoming a limited access freeway. US 1 becomes a major artery for the state as it moves north of Rockingham. After Richmond County, it goes into Moore County with two expressway bypasses in Southern Pines, Vass, and Cameron. US 1 continues with the Jefferson Davis Highway label through Lee County and Sanford, and on to Cary and Raleigh. US 1 runs concurrently with US 64 through most of Cary, where the freeway recently underwent a major renovation and improvements that added lanes in both directions. North of Raleigh, US 1 (known as Capital Boulevard in northern Wake County) crosses I-540 and then again becomes a four-lane divided arterial to I-85 near Henderson. The North Carolina Department of Transportation (NCDOT) has begun a corridor study for this section of US 1 to determine the feasibility of transitioning the stretch of highway from I-540 to Wake Forest into a toll road. Moreover, NCDOT is planning to finish four-laning US 1 in Richmond County past NC 177 with a Rockingham bypass to the east. There are no plans from SCDOT to widen US 1 from the state line. From Henderson into Virginia, US 1 runs parallel with I-85 as a two-lane local road until the state line, where Virginia hosts a continuous third center lane for alternate passing toward US 58 before South Hill.

=== Mid-Atlantic ===
In the Mid-Atlantic, US 1 generally serves some of the most populated areas of the east coast. Through Virginia, US 1 is paralleled by Interstates: the remainder of I-85 to Petersburg, I-95 through Richmond and Fredericksburg to Alexandria, and I-395 into Arlington. In much of Virginia, US 1 was called the Jefferson Davis Highway by state law, although there are exceptions. South of Petersburg, it is known as Boydton Plank Road. Through some of Fairfax County and Alexandria, it is called the Richmond Highway. In February 2021, Virginia renamed all remaining portions of the Jefferson Davis Highway in the state to Emancipation Highway beginning on January 1, 2022.

US 1 crosses the Potomac River with I-395 on the 14th Street bridges and splits to follow mainly 14th Street and Rhode Island Avenue through the District of Columbia. US 1 is at the minimum of three lanes (with alternate passing) from the North Carolina state line to Petersburg with occasional four-lane divided sections. North of Petersburg is a four-lane undivided roadway at the minimum to the DC line. The route of US 1 from Petersburg to the state line is parallel with the Atlantic Seaboard Fall Line. From Petersburg onward, it is parallel with I-95. After exiting DC into Maryland, US 1 follows the Baltimore–Washington Boulevard, the first of several modern highways built along the Washington–Baltimore combined statistical area corridor; I-95 is the newest, after the Baltimore–Washington Parkway. US 1 runs through the University of Maryland, College Park, campus in College Park, Maryland. The route bypasses Downtown Baltimore on North Avenue and exits the city to the northeast on Belair Road, gradually leaving the I-95 corridor, which passes through Wilmington, Delaware, for a straighter path toward Philadelphia. Around and beyond Bel Air, US 1 is a two-lane road, crossing the Susquehanna River over the top of the Conowingo Dam before entering Pennsylvania. (Routed further north, US 1 bypasses the state of Delaware, unlike I-95.)

The two-lane US 1 becomes a four-lane expressway, officially known as the John H. Ware III Memorial Highway, after the Pennsylvania representative, just after crossing into Pennsylvania. This bypass extends around Oxford and Kennett Square, merging into the four-lane divided Baltimore Pike just beyond the latter. At Media, US 1 again becomes a freeway—the Media Bypass—ending just beyond I-476. After several name changes, the road becomes City Avenue, the western city limits of Philadelphia, at the end of which a short overlap with I-76 leads to the Roosevelt Expressway and then the 12-lane Roosevelt Boulevard partly overlapping US 13. US 1 again becomes a freeway after leaving the city, bypassing Penndel and Morrisville and crossing the Delaware River into New Jersey on the Trenton–Morrisville Toll Bridge.

After crossing into New Jersey in Mercer County, US 1 continues on the Trenton Freeway through the state capital of Trenton and Lawrence Township as a four-lane freeway. As the freeway ends, the four-lane divided highway upgrades to six lanes north of I-295 passing through the Penns Neck section of West Windsor. Through Penns Neck is a series of traffic signals. The New Jersey Department of Transportation (NJDOT) is looking to revamp the highway through this area by replacing traffic signals with grade separations. The highway enters Middlesex County through Plainsboro Township and South Brunswick, where the highest point resides. By Forrestal Village, the highway downgrades from six to four lanes until after Finnegans Lane in North Brunswick. Northward, it continues through New Brunswick as a short limited-access highway until the County Route 529 (CR 529)/Plainfield Avenue traffic signal in Edison. Through Edison and Woodbridge Township, US 1 has a mix of boulevard and limited-access segments and continues to do so after the US 9 juncture in the Avenel section of Woodbridge. The US 1/9 concurrency continues through the rest of the state. The six-lane divided highway remains through Rahway in Union County and Elizabeth, until it reaches Newark Liberty International Airport, where it becomes a dual carriageway freeway around downtown Newark in Essex County with a 2–2–2–2 configuration. The historic Pulaski Skyway takes US 1/9 into Jersey City, and the route exits the freeway at the Tonnele Circle to head north into Bergen County. US 1/9 turns onto US 46 as a limited-access highway, and the three routes run northeast to the George Washington Bridge Plaza, where they merge into I-95. US 46 ends in the middle of the bridge, which crosses the Hudson River into New York, and US 9 exits just beyond onto Broadway in Manhattan, but US 1 stays with I-95 onto the Cross Bronx Expressway, exiting in the Bronx onto Webster Avenue. Two turns take US 1 via Fordham Road to Boston Road, which it follows northeast out of the city, becoming Boston Post Road in Westchester County, never straying far from I-95. From the Bronx to the state line, it is a local road with two lanes in each direction, except in Rye where it has a single lane in each direction. As it enters Greenwich, Connecticut, it continues as a two-lane local road.

=== New England ===
In New England, US 1 generally serves large cities in a side street capacity. In Connecticut, US 1 serves the shore of Long Island Sound parallel to I-95. Beyond New Haven, the highway travels east–west, and some signs in the state indicate this rather than the standard north–south. While I-95 in Rhode Island takes a diagonal path to Providence, US 1 continues east along the coast through Westerly to Wakefield-Peacedale, where it turns north and follows Narragansett Bay. Most of this part is a four-lane limited-access highway, providing access to Route 138 toward Newport. After Route 4 splits as a mostly-freeway connection to I-95, US 1 becomes a lower-speed surface road, passing through Warwick, Providence, and Pawtucket. The route parallels I-95 again through Providence and Pawtucket and into Massachusetts, traveling toward Boston as a four-lane road. When it reaches Dedham, US 1 turns east and becomes a freeway through metropolitan Boston, concurrent with I-95 and I-93 east to Braintree and north through Downtown Boston. The Tobin Bridge and Northeast Expressway take US 1 out of Boston, after which it again parallels I-95 as a high-speed surface road through Newburyport to the New Hampshire state line.

The short portion of US 1 in New Hampshire follows the historic Lafayette Road, staying close to I-95, passing through Portsmouth before crossing the Piscataqua River on Memorial Bridge, which was demolished and replaced during 2012–2013, leaving a temporary gap in US 1. During construction, drivers had to detour to one of two other nearby bridges carrying US 1 Bypass or I-95. Within Maine, US 1 begins as a parallel route to I-95 near the Atlantic Ocean. At Portland, I-95 splits off to the north, and I-295 heads northeast paralleling US 1 to Brunswick. There US 1 turns east as a mostly two-lane road along the coast to Calais; much of this portion is advertised as the "Coastal Route" on signs. North from Calais, US 1 follows the Canadian border, crossing I-95 in Houlton and eventually turning west and southwest to its "north" end at the Clair–Fort Kent Bridge in Fort Kent. On the New Brunswick (Canada) side of the bridge, Route 205 extends south and west to Saint-François-de-Madawaska, while the short Route 161 extends north to Route 120, a secondary east–west route from Edmundston, New Brunswick, west to Quebec Route 289 toward Saint-Alexandre-de-Kamouraska, Quebec.

== History ==
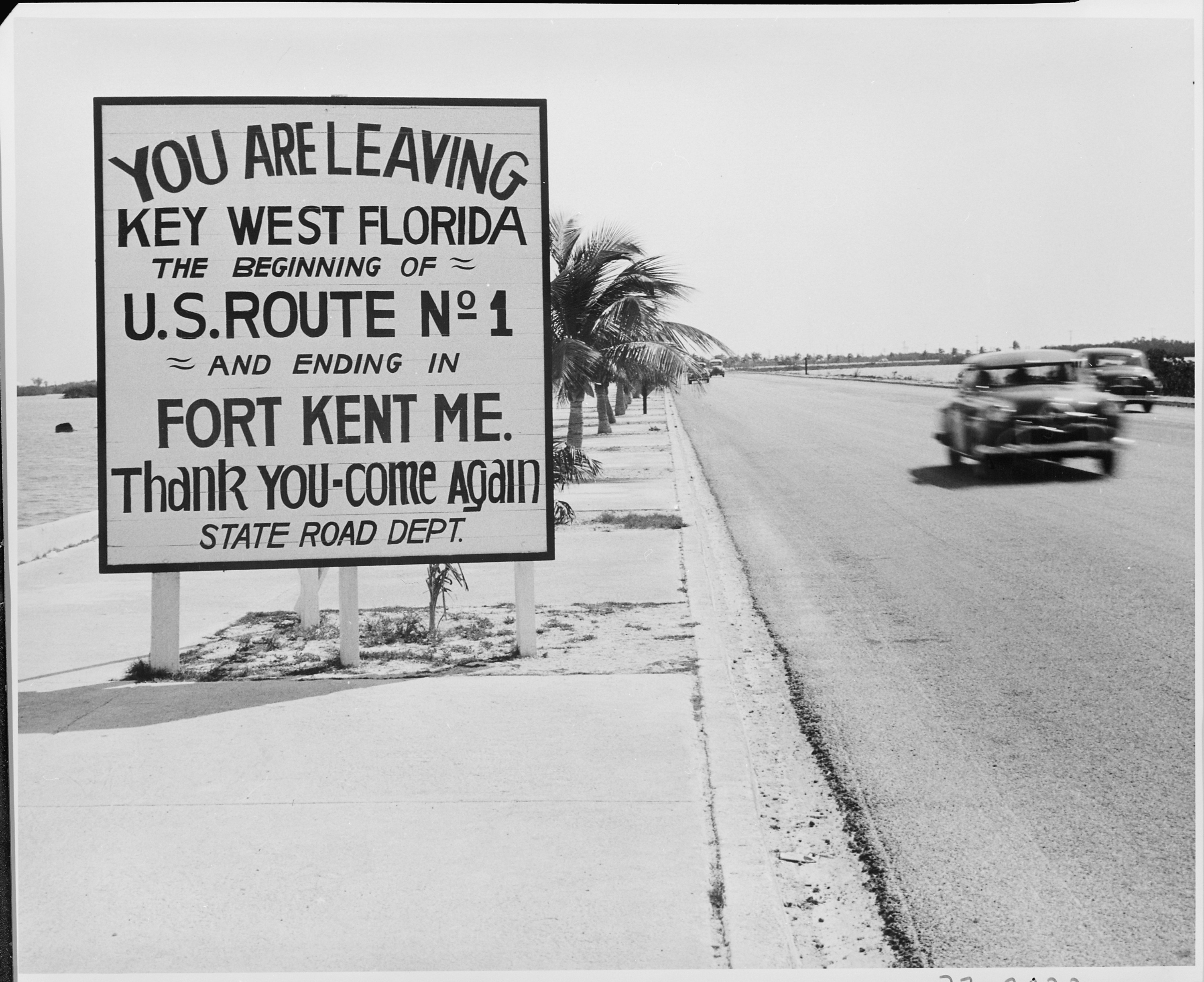
The beginning of US 1 as of March 1951

The direct predecessor to US 1 was the Atlantic Highway, an auto trail established in 1911 as the Quebec–Miami International Highway. In 1915, it was renamed the Atlantic Highway, and the northern terminus was changed to Calais, Maine. Due to the overlapping of auto trail designations, portions of the route had other names that remain in common use, such as the Boston Post Road between Boston and New York City, the Lincoln Highway between New York and Philadelphia, the Baltimore Pike between Philadelphia and Baltimore, and the Dixie Highway in and south of eastern Georgia. North of Augusta, Georgia, the highway generally followed the Atlantic Seaboard Fall Line, rather than a more easterly route through the swamps of the Atlantic Plain. Brickell Avenue is the name given to the two-mile (3.2 km) stretch of US 1 in Miami, Florida, just south of the Miami River until the Rickenbacker Causeway.

When the New England road marking system was established in 1922, the Atlantic Highway within New England was signed as Route 1, with a Route 24 continuing north to Madawaska; New York extended the number to New York City in 1924 with its own Route 1. Other states adopted their own systems of numbering; by 1926 all states but Maryland had signed the Atlantic Highway as various routes, usually changing numbers at the state line. In 1925, the Joint Board on Interstate Highways created a preliminary list of interstate routes to be marked by the states, including US 1 along the Atlantic. This highway began at Fort Kent, Maine, and followed the existing Route 24 to Houlton, as well as Route 15 to Bangor, beyond which it generally followed the Atlantic Highway to Miami. In all states but Georgia that had numbered their state highways, Route 1 followed only one or two numbers across the state. The only significant deviation from the Atlantic Highway was between Augusta, Georgia, and Jacksonville, Florida, where Route 1 was assigned to a more inland route, rather than following the Atlantic Highway via Savannah.

One of the many changes made to the system before the final numbering was adopted in 1926 involved US 1 in Maine. The 1925 plan had assigned US 1 to the shorter inland route (Route 15) between Houlton and Bangor, while US 2 followed the longer coastal route via Calais. In the system as adopted in 1926, US 2 instead took the inland route, while US 1 followed the coast, absorbing all of the former Route 24 and Route 1 in New England. Many local and regional relocations, often onto parallel superhighways, were made in the early days of US 1; this included the four-lane divided Route 25 in New Jersey, completed in 1932 with the opening of the Pulaski Skyway, and a bypass of Bangor involving the Waldo–Hancock Bridge, opened in 1931. The Overseas Highway from Miami to Key West was completed in 1938 and soon became a southern extension of US 1.

With the construction of the Interstate Highway System in and after the 1950s, much of US 1 from Houlton to Miami was bypassed by I-95. Between Houlton and Brunswick, Maine, I-95 took a shorter inland route, much of it paralleling US 2 on the alignment proposed for US 1 in 1925. Between Philadelphia and Baltimore, I-95 leaves US 1 to pass through Wilmington. Most notably, I-95 and US 1 follow different corridors between Petersburg, Virginia, and Jacksonville, Florida; while US 1 followed the Atlantic Seaboard Fall Line west of the coastal plain, I-95 takes a more direct route through the plain and its swamps. Although some of this part of US 1 was followed by other Interstates—I-85 between Petersburg and Henderson, North Carolina, and I-20 between Camden, South Carolina, and Augusta, Georgia—the rest remains an independent route with four lanes in many places. By the late 1970s, most of I-95 had been completed, replacing US 1 as the main corridor of the east coast and relegating most of it to local road status.

== Major intersections ==
Florida
Whitehead Street and Fleming Street in Key West
Florida's Turnpike Extension in Florida City
I-95 in Miami
US 41 in Miami
I-395 in Miami
US 27 in Miami
I-195 in Miami
I-595 on the Dania Beach–Fort Lauderdale, Florida city line
US 98 in West Palm Beach
US 192 in Melbourne
US 92 in Daytona Beach
I-95 in Ormond Beach
I-95 near Palm Coast
I-295 in Jacksonville
I-95 in Jacksonville
I-95 in Jacksonville. The highways travel concurrently through the city.
US 90 in Jacksonville. The highways travel concurrently through the city.
US 17 in Jacksonville. The highways travel concurrently through the city.
US 23 in Jacksonville
I-95 in Jacksonville
US 23 in Jacksonville. The highways travel concurrently to north of Alma, Georgia.
I-295 in Jacksonville
US 301 in Callahan. The highways travel concurrently to Homeland, Georgia.
Georgia
US 82 in Waycross. US 1/US 82/SR 520 travels concurrently to west of Deenwood.
US 84 in Waycross. The highways travel concurrently through the city.
US 341 in Baxley
US 280 in Lyons
I-16 in Oak Park
US 80 in Swainsboro
US 319 in Wadley
US 221 in Louisville. US 1/US 221 travels concurrently to Wrens.
I-520 in Augusta
US 78 / US 278 in Augusta. US 1/US 78 travels concurrently to Aiken, South Carolina. US 1/US 278 travels concurrently to Clearwater, South Carolina. US 1/SR 10 travels concurrently to the South Carolina state line.
US 25 in Augusta. US 1/US 25 travels concurrently to North Augusta, South Carolina. US 1/SR 121 travels concurrently to the South Carolina state line.
South Carolina

I-520 in North Augusta
I-20 north-northeast of Aiken
US 178 in Batesburg-Leesville
US 378 in Lexington. The highways travel concurrently through the city.
I-20 east of Lexington
I-26 in Oak Grove
US 378 in West Columbia. The highways travel concurrently to Columbia.
US 21 / US 176 / US 321 in Columbia
US 76 in Columbia. The highways travel concurrently through the city.
I-20 in Dentsville
I-77 in Dentsville
US 601 in Lugoff. The highways travel concurrently to Camden.
US 521 / US 601 in Camden
US 52 south-southwest of Cheraw. The highways travel concurrently to Cheraw.
North Carolina
Future I-74 / US 74 west-southwest of East Rockingham
US 220 in Rockingham
US 15 / US 501 in Aberdeen. The highways travel concurrently through the city.
US 15 / US 501 north-northeast of Cameron. The highways travel concurrently to Sanford.
US 421 in Sanford
US 64 in Cary. The highways travel concurrently to Raleigh.
I-40 / I-440 / US 64 in Raleigh. I-440/US 1 travels concurrently through the city.
US 70 in Raleigh
I-440 / US 401 in Raleigh. US 1/US 401 travels concurrently through the city.
I-540 near Raleigh
US 158 northeast of Henderson. The highways travel concurrently to Norlina.
I-85 southwest of Middleburg
US 158 / US 401 in Middleburg. US 1/US 401 travels concurrently to north-northwest of Wise.
I-85 / US 401 north-northwest of Wise
Virginia
US 58 southwest of South Hill. The highways travel concurrently to just southwest of the city.
I-85 in South Hill
I-85 south of Alberta
I-85 / US 460 southwest of Petersburg. US 1/US 460 Bus. travels concurrently to Petersburg.
US 301 in Petersburg. The highways travel concurrently to Richmond.
US 360 in Richmond
US 60 in Richmond
US 33 / US 250 in Richmond
I-64 / I-95 in Richmond
I-95 in Lakeside
I-295 in Glen Allen
US 17 east-northeast of Spotsylvania. The highways travel concurrently to south of Fredericksburg.
I-95 / US 17 south of Fredericksburg
I-95 in Lorton
I-95 / I-495 in Alexandria
I-395 in Arlington. The highways travel concurrently to Washington, D.C.
District of Columbia
US 50 in Washington. The highways travel concurrently through part of the city.
US 29 in Washington. The two highways bump into each other at the intersection of 6th Street NW and Rhode Island Avenue NW.
Maryland
I-95 / I-495 in College Park
I-895 in Elkridge
I-195 in Arbutus
US 40 in Baltimore
I-83 in Baltimore
I-695 in Overlea
US 222 in Conowingo
Pennsylvania
US 202 / US 322 in Concordville. US 1/US 322 travels concurrently through the community.
I-476 in Marple Township
US 30 on the Wynnewood–Philadelphia city line
I-76 on the Bala Cynwyd–Philadelphia city line. The highways travel concurrently into Philadelphia proper.
US 13 in Philadelphia. The highways travel concurrently through part of the city.
I-276 in Bensalem Township
I-295 in Woodbourne
US 13 southwest of Morrisville
New Jersey
I-295 in Lawrence Township
US 130 in North Brunswick
I-287 on the Edison–Metuchen city line
US 9 in Woodbridge Township. The highways travel concurrently to New York City.
I-278 in Linden
I-78 / I-95 in Newark
US 22 in Newark
I-78 / I-95 in Newark
I-95 in Newark
US 46 in Palisades Park. The highways travel concurrently to the New Jersey-New York state line at the George Washington Bridge.
US 9W in Fort Lee
I-95 in Fort Lee. The highways travel concurrently to The Bronx, New York City.
US 46 at the New Jersey–New York state line
New York
US 9 in Manhattan, New York City
I-87 in The Bronx, New York City
I-95 in The Bronx, New York City
I-95 in New Rochelle
I-95 in Rye
I-287 on the Rye–Port Chester city line
Connecticut
I-95 in Stamford
I-95 in Darien
US 7 in Norwalk
I-95 in Fairfield
I-95 in Stratford
I-95 in Milford
I-91 in New Haven
I-95 in East Haven
I-95 in Branford
I-95 in Guilford
I-95 in Old Saybrook. The highways travel concurrently to Old Lyme.
I-95 in East Lyme
I-95 in New London. The highways travel concurrently to Groton.
Rhode Island
US 6 in Providence
US 44 in Providence. The highways travel concurrently for one block.
I-95 in Pawtucket. The highways travel concurrently for less than 1 mile (1.6 km).
Massachusetts
I-95 in Attleboro
I-295 in North Attleborough
I-495 in Plainville
I-95 in Sharon
I-95 on the Westwood–Dedham city line. The highways travel concurrently to Canton.
I-93 / I-95 in Canton. I-93/US 1 travel concurrently to Boston.
US 3 in Boston
I-90 in Boston
I-95 in Peabody
I-95 in Peabody
I-95 in Danvers
New Hampshire
US 4 in Portsmouth
Maine
I-95 in Kittery
I-195 in Saco
I-295 in South Portland. The highways travel concurrently to Portland.
US 302 in Portland
I-495 in Falmouth
I-295 in Yarmouth
I-295 in Yarmouth
I-295 in Freeport
I-295 in Brunswick
US 201 in Brunswick
US 2 in Houlton. The highways travel concurrently through the city.
I-95 in Houlton
Route 161 / Route 205 at the Fort Kent–Clair Border Crossing in Fort Kent

== Auxiliary routes ==
US 1 has six three-digit auxiliary routes. In numerical order, these are:

- US 201, from Brunswick, Maine, to the Armstrong–Jackman Border Crossing running south to north in east-central Maine.
- US 301, from Sarasota, Florida, to Biddles Corner, Delaware, along the East Coast. Most of the route closely parallels I-95 and it has numerous intersections with its parent.
- US 401 from Sumter, South Carolina, to Wise, North Carolina, near the Virginia border. For most of the route, it parallels US 1 about 10 to 20 miles (16 to 32 km) to the east, though the two share pavement in Raleigh, North Carolina.
- US 501 from Myrtle Beach, South Carolina, to Buena Vista, Virginia. The highway runs southeast–northwest, meeting its parent in Aberdeen and Sanford.
- US 601 from Tarboro, South Carolina, to Mount Airy, North Carolina. It runs mostly due south–north to the west of US 501, meeting the parent route in Camden, South Carolina.
- US 701 from Georgetown, South Carolina, to Four Oaks, North Carolina. Furthest east of the US 1 auxiliary routes, it never meets its parent route, but does intersect US 501 in Conway, South Carolina, and terminates at US 301 at its northern end.

US 101, despite its number, is not an auxiliary route, but rather considered a primary U.S. Route in its own right as major highway west of the former US 99 on the west coast of the U.S. (In the numbering scheme, its first "digit" is "10".)

== Related state highways ==
- Florida State Road A1A
- Massachusetts Route 1A
- New Hampshire Route 1A
- New York State Route 1A
- Rhode Island Route 1A

== In popular culture ==
- The route in Richard Bachman's horror novel, The Long Walk (1979), begins each year at the Maine–New Brunswick border at 9:00 on the morning of May 1 and travels down the East Coast of the United States, along US 1, until the winner is determined.
- The Atlantic Highway features prominently as both a location, and a character in Seanan McGuire's Ghost Roads series.

== See also ==
- U.S. Route 1A
- Special routes of U.S. Route 1
