= Antony Clavet =

- Born: May 6, 1945; Saint-François, New Brunswick, Canada
- Died: October 24, 1990 (aged 45); Biarritz, Pyrénées-Atlantiques, France
- Occupations: Make-up artist and hair stylist

Antony Clavet (May 6, 1945 – October 24, 1990) was a Canadian make-up artist and hair stylist.

== Early life and career ==
Antony Clavet was born in Saint-François, New Brunswick on May 6, 1945, to parents Harvey and Rita Clavet. He was of Acadian descent. Clavet moved to Montreal at age 16 where he began working as a make-up artist for drag performers and strippers, eventually landing a position at Elizabeth Arden. He was particularly known for his extensive work with David Bowie, having done make-up and hair for several of Bowie's album covers, portraits, films, and music videos such as those for "Heroes" and "Let's Dance".

Clavet died of bone cancer on October 24, 1990, in Biarritz, France, at age 45.

== Selected filmography ==
- The Disappearance (1977)
- The Hunger (1983)
- Merry Christmas, Mr. Lawrence (1983)
- The Cotton Club (1984)
- Miami Vice (1984–1990)
- Top Gun (1986)
