= New Brunswick Route 215 =

Highway in New Brunswick, Canada

Route 215

Route information
- Maintained by New Brunswick Department of Transportation
- Length: 15.0 km (9.3 mi)
- Existed: 2001–present

Major junctions
- South end: Route 205 in Saint-François-de-Madawaska
- North end: Route 120 at Lac Baker on the New Brunswick-Quebec border

Location
- Country: Canada
- Province: New Brunswick
- Counties: Madawaska

Highway system
- Provincial highways in New Brunswick; Former routes
← Route 205	→ Route 218

Route 215 is a 15 km (9.3 mi) local highway in northwestern New Brunswick, Canada.

== Communities ==
- Saint-François-de-Madawaska
- Lac-Unique
- Boundary

== See also ==
- List of New Brunswick provincial highways
