= New Brunswick Route 205 =

Highway in New Brunswick, Canada

Route 205

Route information
- Maintained by New Brunswick Department of Transportation
- Length: 33.7 km (20.9 mi)
- Existed: 1965–present

Major junctions
- West end: English Point
- East end: Route 161 in Clair

Location
- Country: Canada
- Province: New Brunswick
- Counties: Madawaska

Highway system
- Provincial highways in New Brunswick; Former routes
← Route 190	→ Route 215

Route 205 is a New Brunswick local highway that runs for 33.7 kilometres along the Saint John River and Maine border in Madawaska County. The route starts at the International Bridge in Clair (across from Fort Kent, Maine) and ends at English Point on Glasier Lake. The route also serves the communities of Saint-François-de-Madawaska and Connors.

== Communities ==
- Connors
- Saint-François-de-Madawaska
- Clair
- Val Oakes
- Pelletiers Mill

== See also ==
- List of New Brunswick provincial highways
