= Saint-François-de-Madawaska =

- Village
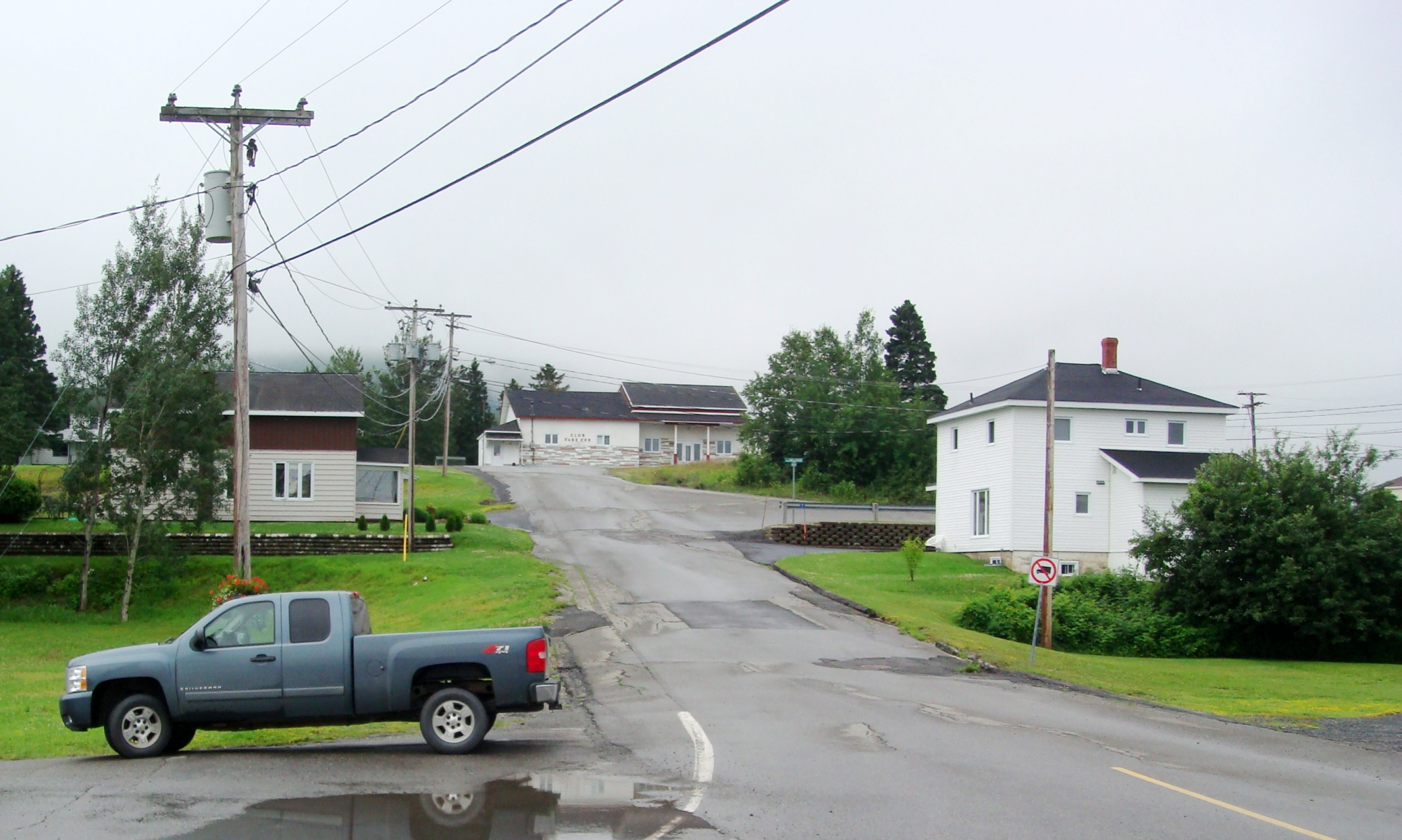

- Location of Saint-François-de-Madawaska, New Brunswick
- Coordinates: 47.2425°N 68.705°W
- Country: Canada
- Province: New Brunswick
- County: Madawaska
- Parish: Saint-François
- Village Status: 1966
- Electoral Districts Federal: Madawaska—Restigouche
- Provincial: Madawaska-les-Lacs

Government
  - Type: Village Council
  - Mayor: Gérard Cyr Cyr
  - Councillors: List of Members: Colette Levesque; Chantal Veilleux; Pierre Ouellette; Sylvain St-Onge

Area
  - Total: 6.39 km^{2} (2.47 sq mi)

Population (2016)
  - Total: 470
  - Density: 73.5/km^{2} (190/sq mi)
  - Change 2011–16: ▼11.8%
- Time zone: UTC-4 (AST)
  - Summer (DST): UTC-3 (ADT)
- Area code: 506
- Dwellings: 265
- Median Household Income*: $45,952 CDN
- Access Routes: Route 205; Route 215
- Median household income, 2015 (all households)

Saint-François-de-Madawaska (2016 pop.: 470) is a former village in Madawaska County, New Brunswick, Canada.

The village is known as the province's "Chicken Capital", referring to its role in the poultry industry. Former and merged names for the community include Webster's Creek and Winding Ledges.

Nearby attractions include Glazier Lake and the Forges Jos B. Michaud, a blacksmith museum.

The largest employers of the village include a poultry slaughtering factory and processing plant owned by Maple Lodge, two chicken-raising company owned by Westco.

== Demographics ==
Population trend

Census	Population	Change (%)
2016	470	▼11.8%
2011	533	▼8.9%
2006	585	▲2.3%
2001	572	▼9.4%
1996	631	▼4.5%
1991	661	N/A

Mother tongue (2016)

Language	Population	Pct (%)
French only	440	94.6%
English only	20	4.3%
Both English and French	5	1.1%
Other languages	0	0%

== See also ==
- List of communities in New Brunswick
