= Woodstock-Hartland =

Provincial electoral district in New Brunswick, Canada

New Brunswick electoral district
- The riding of Woodstock-Hartland (as it exists from 2023) in relation to other New Brunswick electoral districts
- Coordinates: 46.303°N 67.544°W

Provincial electoral district
- Legislature: Legislative Assembly of New Brunswick
MLA
Bill Hogan
Progressive Conservative
- District created: 2013
- First contested: 2014
- Last contested: 2024

Demographics
- Population (2011): 16,186
- Electors (2013): 10,984
- Census division(s): Carleton, York
- Census subdivision(s): Aberdeen, Bright, Brighton, Hartland, Kent, Northampton, Peel, Richmond, Simonds, Wakefield, Wicklow, Wilmot, Woodstock (parish), Woodstock (town)

Woodstock-Hartland is a provincial electoral district for the Legislative Assembly of New Brunswick, Canada. It is located in the west-central part of the province, and is centred on the towns of Woodstock and Hartland. It was first contested as Carleton in the 2014 general election, having been created in the 2013 redistribution of electoral boundaries from portions of the former ridings of Woodstock, Carleton and a small part of York North. The riding was renamed Woodstock-Hartland following the 2023 redistribution.

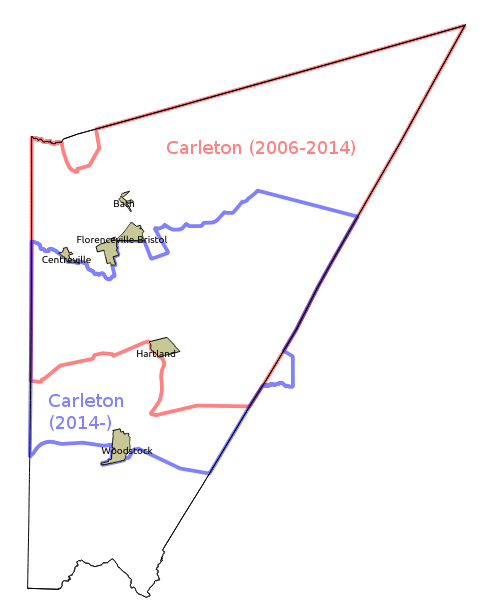
The electoral districts of Carleton (2006–2014) and Carleton (2014–) as they relate to Carleton County and its municipalities.

The district includes the south-central parts of Carleton County.

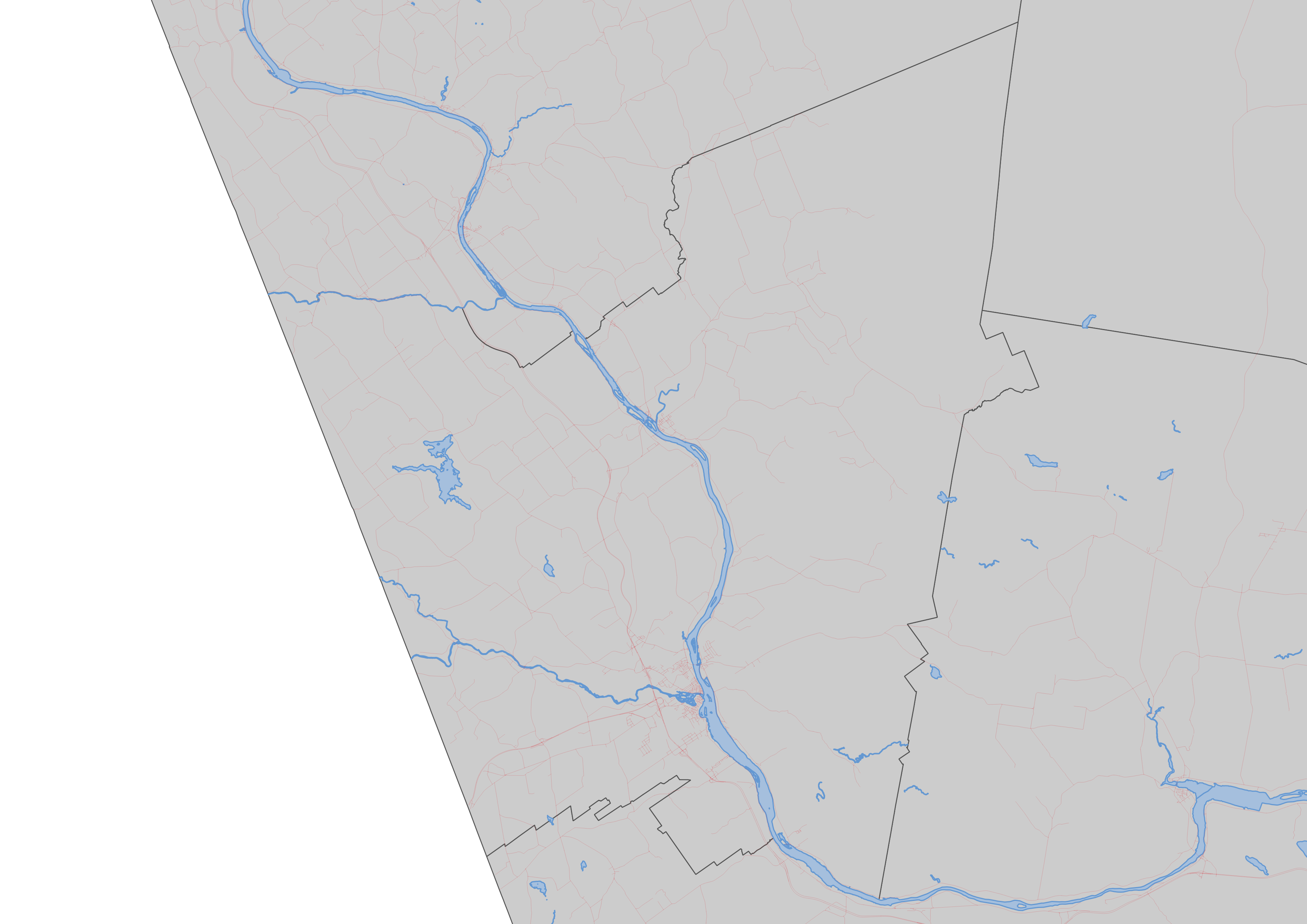
Woodstock-Hartland (as it exists from 2023) and the roads in the riding

== Members of the Legislative Assembly ==
Assembly	Years	Member	Party
Carleton; Riding created from Woodstock, Carleton (1995–2014) and York North
58th	2014–2015	David Alward	Progressive Conservative
58th	2015–2018	Stewart Fairgrieve	Progressive Conservative
59th	2018–2020	Stewart Fairgrieve	Progressive Conservative
60th	2020–2024	Bill Hogan	Progressive Conservative
Woodstock-Hartland
61st	2024–Present	Bill Hogan	Progressive Conservative

== Election results ==
=== Woodstock-Hartland ===
2024 New Brunswick general election
Party	Candidate	Votes	%	±%
Progressive Conservative	Bill Hogan	4,199	52.8%	+4.93
Liberal	Marisa Pelkey	2,549	32.1%	+15.33
People's Alliance	Charlie Webber	575	7.2%	-18.65
Green	Jada Roche	276	3.5%	-4.37
Independent	Ernest Culberson	209	2.6%	
New Democratic	Bo Sheaves	138	1.7%	+0.62
Total valid votes		7,946		
Total rejected ballots				
Turnout				
Eligible voters				
Progressive Conservative hold		Swing		
Source: Elections New Brunswick

=== Carleton ===
2020 New Brunswick general election
Party	Candidate	Votes	%	±%
Progressive Conservative	Bill Hogan	3,536	47.87	+8.29
People's Alliance	Graham Gill	1,909	25.85	-1.04
Liberal	Theresa Blackburn	1,239	16.77	+0.89
Green	Greg Crouse	581	7.87	-8.68
New Democratic	Shawn Oldenburg	80	1.08	-0.01
KISS	Andy Walton	41	0.56	New
Total valid votes		7,386	99.53	
Total rejected ballots		35	0.47	
Turnout		7,411	66.04	
Eligible voters		11,222		
Progressive Conservative hold		Swing		+4.67
Source: Elections New Brunswick

2018 New Brunswick general election
Party	Candidate	Votes	%	±%
Progressive Conservative	Stewart Fairgrieve	2,982	39.58	-9.35
People's Alliance	Stewart B. Manuel	2,026	26.89	+25.41
Green	Amy Anderson	1,247	16.55	+4.38
Liberal	Christy Culberson	1,197	15.88	-17.60
New Democratic	Adam McAvoy	82	1.09	-1.86
Total valid votes		7,534	100.0	
Total rejected ballots		12		
Turnout		7,546	66.47	
Eligible voters		11,353		
Source: Elections New Brunswick

New Brunswick provincial by-election, 5 October 2015 On the resignation of David Alward, 22 May 2015
Party	Candidate	Votes	%	±%
Progressive Conservative	Stewart Fairgrieve	3,145	48.93	-7.85
Liberal	Courtney Keenan	2,152	33.48	+11.28
Green	Andrew Clark	782	12.17	+1.68
New Democratic	Greg Crouse	254	3.95	-4.16
People's Alliance	Randall Leavitt	95	1.48	-0.95
Total valid votes		6,428	100.00	
Total rejected ballots		15	0.23	-0.09
Turnout		6,443	56.25	-6.92
Eligible voters		11,454		
Source: Elections New Brunswick

2014 New Brunswick general election
Party	Candidate	Votes	%
Progressive Conservative	David Alward	4,061	56.77
Liberal	Tom Reid	1,588	22.20
Green	Andrew Clark	750	10.49
New Democratic	Jeremiah Clark	580	8.11
People's Alliance	Steven Love	174	2.43
Total valid votes		7,153	100.0
Total rejected ballots		23	0.32
Turnout		7,176	63.17
Eligible voters		11,360	
This riding was created from parts of Woodstock and the former riding of Carleton, which both elected Progressive Conservatives in the previous election. David Alward was the incumbent from Woodstock.
Source: Elections New Brunswick

== See also ==
- List of New Brunswick provincial electoral districts
- Canadian provincial electoral districts
