= Wicklow Parish, New Brunswick =

Wicklow
- Parish
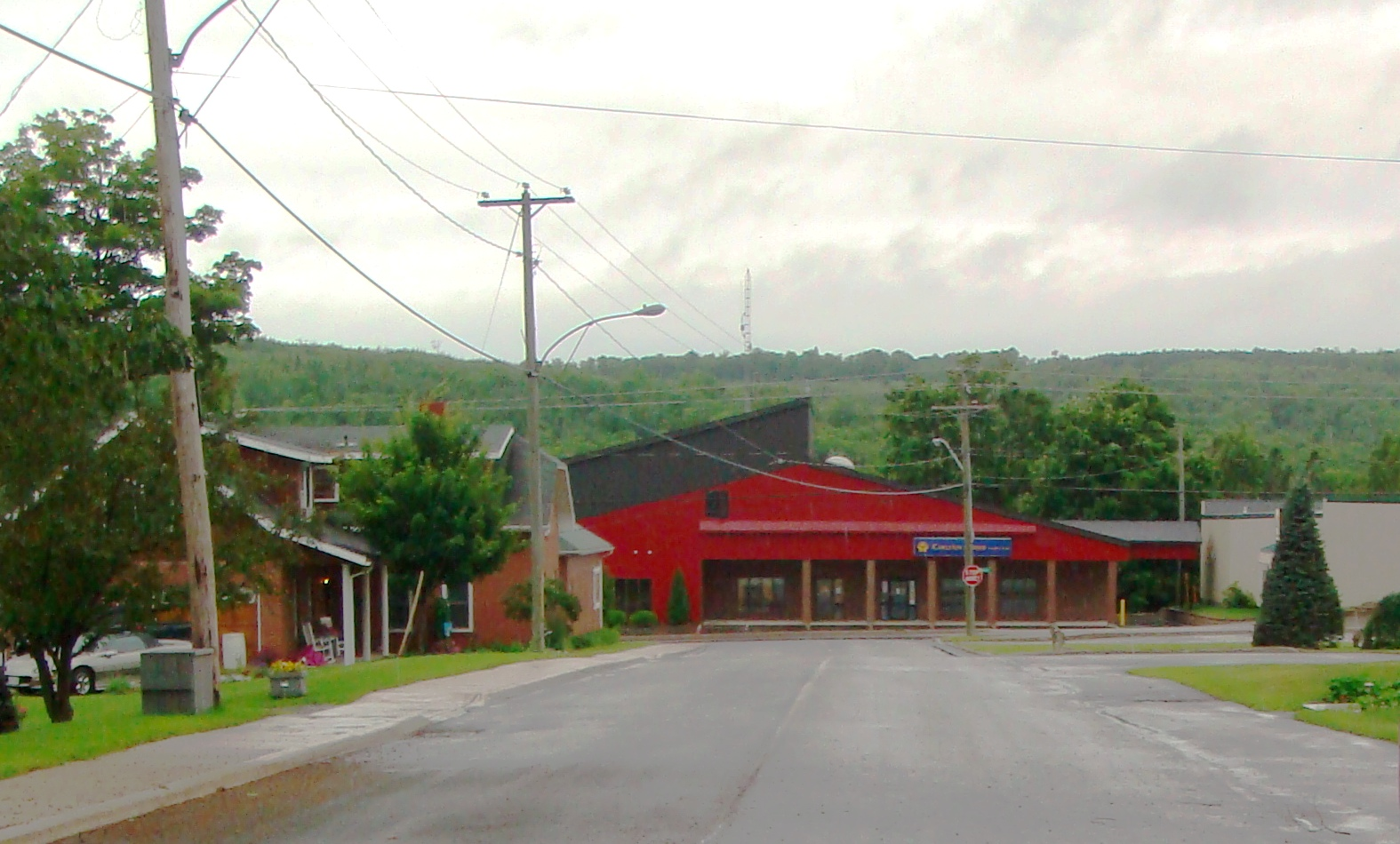
- Centreville, in Wicklow Parish

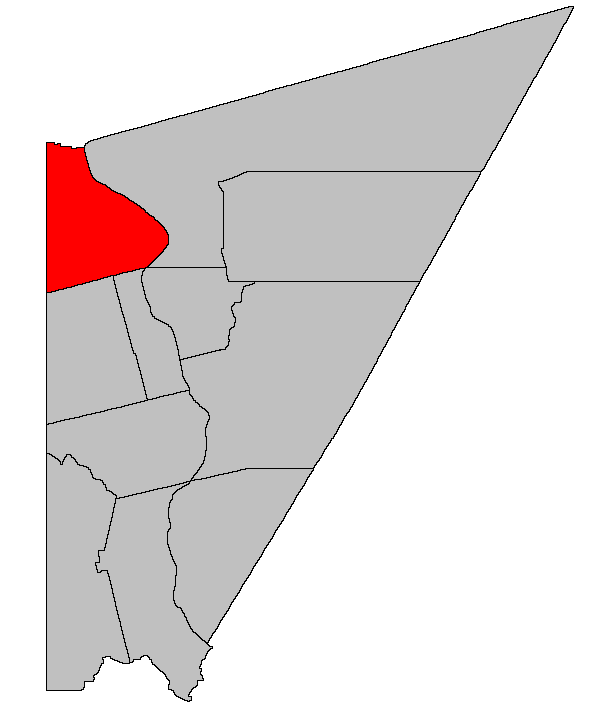
- Location within Carleton County, New Brunswick.
- Coordinates: 46.51°N 67.61°W
- Country: Canada
- Province: New Brunswick
- County: Carleton
- Erected: 1833

Area
  - Land: 195.50 km^{2} (75.48 sq mi)

Population (2021)
  - Total: 1,591
  - Density: 8.1/km^{2} (21/sq mi)
  - Change 2016-2021: ▼6.2%
  - Dwellings: 678
- Time zone: UTC-4 (AST)
  - Summer (DST): UTC-3 (ADT)
- Figures do not include portions within the town of Florenceville-Bristol and the village of Centreville

Wicklow is a geographic parish in Carleton County, New Brunswick, Canada, forming the northwestern corner of Carleton County.

Prior to the 2023 governance reform, for governance purposes it was comprised a single local service district and parts of one town and one village, all of which were members of the Western Valley Regional Service Commission (WVRSC).

The Census subdivision of Wicklow Parish includes all of the parish outside the two municipalities.

== Origin of name ==
The parish may have been named after the town of Wicklow or County Wicklow in Ireland. William Francis Ganong listed its origin as uncertain.

== History ==
Wicklow was erected in 1833 as part of the five-way split of Kent Parish. The parish extended west to include part of Maine claimed by New Brunswick.

== Boundaries ==
Wicklow Parish is bounded:

- on the west by the international border;
- on the north by the River de Chute;
- on the east by the Saint John River;
- and on the south by southern line of a land grant at the mouth of Whitemarsh Brook and its prolongation to the international border.
- It also includes any islands in front of it in the Saint John River.

=== Evolution of boundaries ===
Wicklow's southern boundary originally paralleled the northern boundary of Woodstock Parish, running closer to due west than its present course. The eastern boundary was the Saint John River.

In 1842 New Brunswick's land boundary with Maine was settled by the Webster–Ashburton Treaty, ending Wicklow's implicit claim to part of the state.

In 1850 the boundary within the Saint John River was altered, adding any islands in front of the parish to Wicklow. The southern boundary was moved north more than a kilometre to the northern line of a three-lot grant to Henry M. Green, taking a strip of the parish that included the northern part of Centreville.

In 1870 the boundary with Simonds and Wilmot Parishes was moved south to start at its original point at the mouth of the Whitemarsh but then run westerly along the prolongation of the northern line of southernmost lot of the grant to Henry M. Green.

== Municipalities ==
The town of Florenceville-Bristol extends into a small area in the southeastern corner along Routes 110 and 130.

The village of Centreville straddles the southern parish line along Route 110, Route 560, and Gregg Settlement Road.

== Local service district ==
The local service district of the parish of Wicklow comprised all of the parish outside the two municipalities.

The LSD was established in 1966 to assess for fire protection. Community services were added in 1967.

In 2020, the LSD assessed for the basic LSD services of fire protection, police services, land use planning, emergency measures, and dog control. The taxing authority was 216.00 Wicklow.

LSD advisory committee: Unknown.

== Communities ==
Communities at least partly within the parish; bold indicates an incorporated municipality

- **Centreville**
- Clearview
- **Florenceville-Bristol**
- Greenfield
- Gregg Settlement
- Hartley Settlement
- Knoxford
- Lamoreaux Corner
- Listerville
- Lower Greenfield
- Lower Royalton
- McGrath Corner
- McMonagle Corner
- Orchards Corner
- River de Chute
- Royalton
- Summerfield
- Thomas Corner
- Tracey Mills
- Tweedie
- Upper Knoxford
- Upper Royalton
- Upper Wicklow
- Wakem Corner
- Wicklow

== Bodies of water ==
Bodies of water (Note: Not including brooks, ponds or coves.) at least partly in the parish:

- River de Chute
- Saint John River
- Big Presque Isle Stream
- Whitemarsh Creek
- Barrett Lake
- Carlisle Lakes
- Lawrence Lakes
- Leith Lake
- Reid Lake
- Round Lake
- Tweedie Lake

== Islands ==
Islands at least partly in the parish:

- Green Island

== Other notable places ==
Parks, historic sites, and other noteworthy places at least partly in the parish.

- Beechwood Dam
- Green Island Protected Natural Area
- River de Chute Protected Natural Area

== Demographics ==
Parish population total does not include portions within Centreville and Florenceville-Bristol

=== Population ===
**Population trend**

Census	Population	Change (%)
2016	1,697	▼2.4%
2011	1,738	▼0.9%
2006	1,753	▼7.0%
2001	1,885	▼2.9%
1996	1,942	▲0.7%
1991	1,928	N/A

=== Language ===
**Mother tongue (2016)**

Language	Population	Pct (%)
English only	1,625	95.9%
French only	30	1.8%
Other languages	35	2.0%
Both English and French	5	0.3%

== See also ==
- List of parishes in New Brunswick
