= New Brunswick Route 130 =

Highway in New Brunswick

Route 130

Route information
- Maintained by New Brunswick Department of Transportation
- Length: 101.43 km (63.03 mi)
- Existed: 1965.–present

Major junctions
- North end: Route 108 in Grand Falls
- South end: Route 2 (TCH) in Waterville

Location
- Country: Canada
- Province: New Brunswick
- Counties: Carleton, Victoria

Highway system
- Provincial highways in New Brunswick; Former routes
← Route 128	→ Route 132

Route 130 is a mostly north–south provincial highway in the Canadian province of New Brunswick. The road has a length of approximately 108 kilometres, and services small, otherwise isolated rural communities. In these areas, the highway is often unofficially referred to as "Main Street". The highway is known as Broadway and Portage Road in Grand Falls, and West Riverside Drive in Southern Victoria.

== History ==
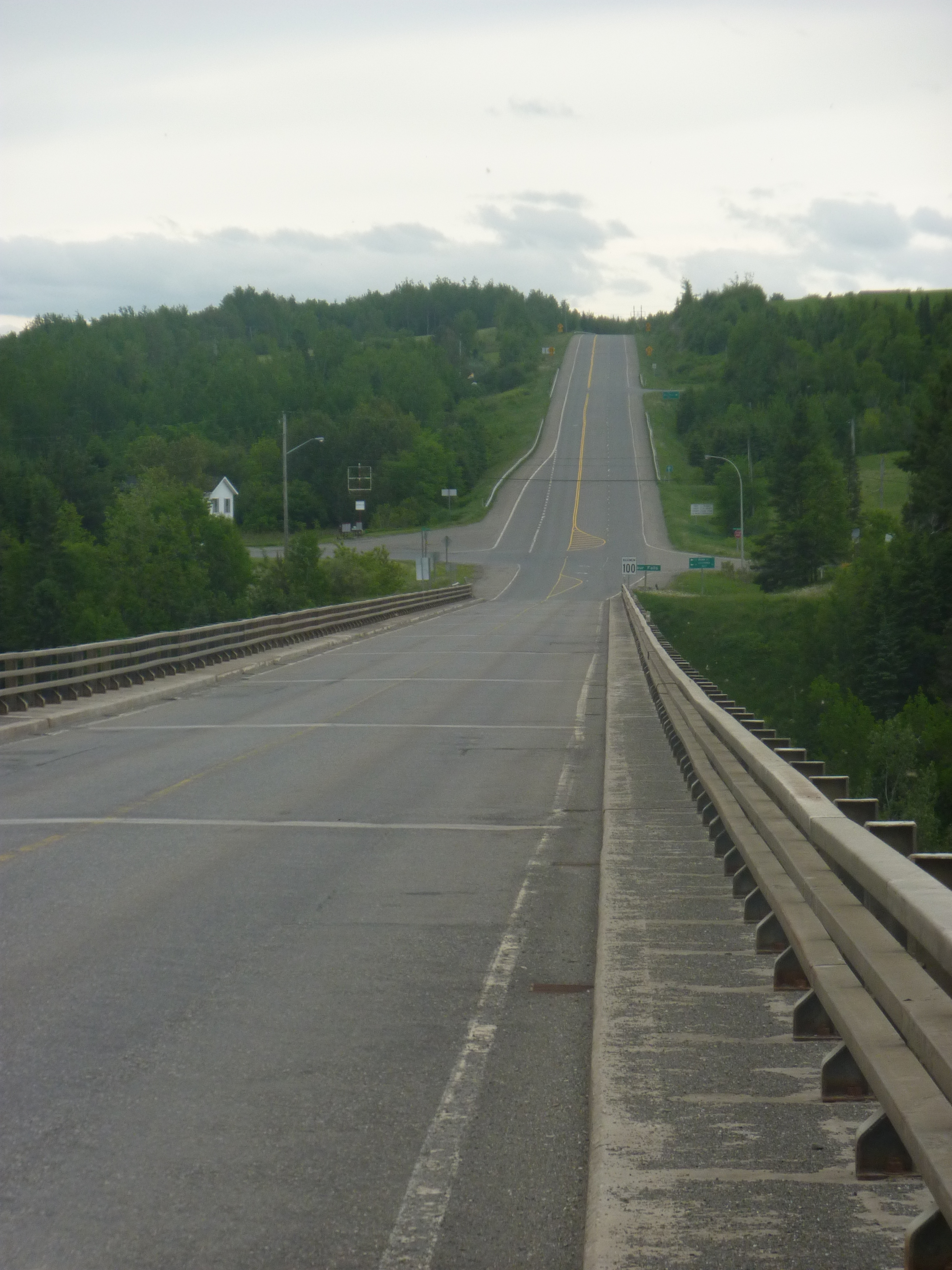
Route 130 at Aroostook

Route 130 was created in 1965 as a short spur from the Trans-Canada Highway into Grand Falls. When a new 4-lane TCH was opened in 2007, the route was extended by over 95 km south from Grand Falls along the former TCH to Aroostook, along a formerly unnumbered route (part of the original Route 2 until the 1960s) from Aroostook to Southern Victoria, the former TCH again from Southern Victoria to Somerville (near Hartland), and a new access road that meets up with the new highway at Waterville.

== Major intersections ==
County	Location	km	mi	Destinations	Notes
Carleton	Waterville	0.0	0.0	Route 2 (TCH) – Woodstock, Fredericton, Edmunston	Southern terminus; exit 172 on Route 2
Carleton	Waterville	1.2	0.75	Route 590 south – Waterville, Jacksonville	
Carleton	Somerville	2.2	1.4	Somerville Road	At-grade; no southbound exit, former Route 2 exit 174
Carleton	Somerville	4.2	2.6	Route 103 – Somerville, Woodstock, Centreville	
Carleton	↑ / ↓	4.3– 4.9	2.7– 3.0	Hugh John Flemming Bridge crosses the Saint John River	
Carleton	Hartland	4.9	3.0	Route 105 – Hartland, Nackawic-Millville, Florenceville	Interchange; former Route 2 exit 170
Carleton	Upper Brighton	5.8	3.6	Route 104 east – Lower Windsor, Nackawic-Millville	
Carleton		11.5	7.1	Lansdowne Road – Peel, Mount Pleasant	Interchange; former Route 2 exit 164
Carleton	Florenceville-Bristol	22.9	14.2	Route 105 (Main Street) – Hartland, Florenceville, Bristol, Bath	Interchange; former Route 2 exit 153
Carleton	Florenceville-Bristol	22.9– 23.4	14.2– 14.5	Crosses the Saint John River	
Carleton	Florenceville-Bristol	23.4	14.5	Centreville Road	Interchange; no southbound entrance
Carleton	Florenceville-Bristol	24.8	15.4	Route 110 west – Centreville	
Carleton	River de Chute	45.6	28.3	Route 560 west – Upper Knoxford	
Victoria		60.4	37.5	F. Tribe Road	
Victoria	Southern Victoria	62.6	38.9	Route 109 to Route 105 – Tobique Valley	
Victoria	Southern Victoria	64.3	40.0	Route 190 west – Carlingford, Fort Fairfield (Maine)	
Victoria	Aroostook	66.4– 67.4	41.3– 41.9	Route 2 (TCH) – Woodstock, Edmundston	Exit 107 on Route 2
Victoria	Four Falls	67.9	42.2	Crosses the Aroostook River	
Victoria		74.6	46.4	Route 2 (TCH) – Woodstock, Edmundston	Exit 99 on Route 2
Victoria	Lower Portage	79.7	49.5	Route 375 west – Limestone (Maine)	
Victoria	Argosy	85.6	53.2	Route 2 (TCH) – Woodstock, Edmundston	Exit 88 on Route 2
Victoria	Grand Falls Portage	90.4	56.2	Route 2 (TCH) – Woodstock, Edmundston	Northbound exit and entrance; exit 83 on Route 2
Victoria	Grand Falls	94.1	58.5	Main Street (Route 218 west) to US 1A / Broadway Boulevard	
Victoria	Grand Falls	95.0	59.0	Crosses the Saint John River	
Victoria	Grand Falls	95.1	59.1	Route 108 to Route 2 (TCH) – Saint-Andre, Edmundston, Drummond, Tobique Valley	Northern terminus
1.000 mi = 1.609 km; 1.000 km = 0.621 mi: Incomplete access

== Communities along the Route ==
- Grand Falls
- Grand Falls Portage
- Lower Portage
- Four Falls
- Aroostook
- Aroostook Junction
- Southern Victoria
- Hillandale
- Beaconsfield
- Bairdsville
- River de Chute
- Clearview
- Upper Wicklow
- Wicklow
- Florenceville
- Riverbank
- Stickney
- Lansdowne
- Upper Brighton
- Somerville
- Waterville

== See also ==
- List of New Brunswick provincial highways
