= Kent Parish, New Brunswick =

Kent
- Parish
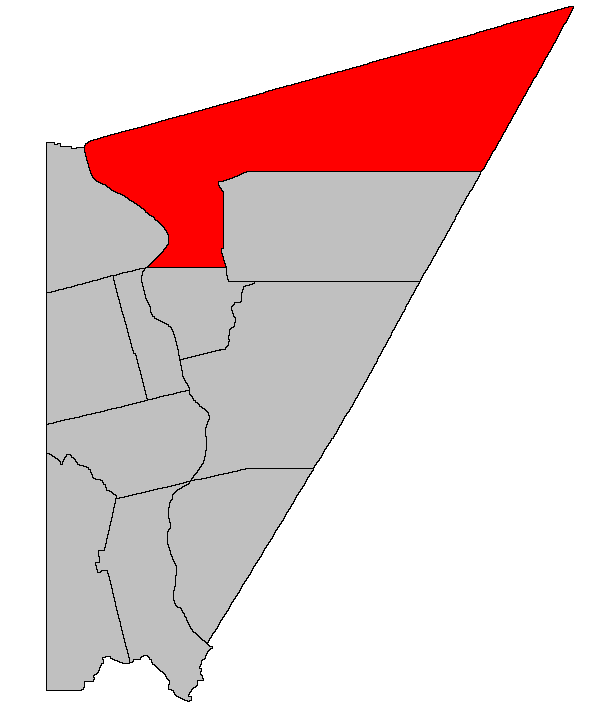
- Location within Carleton County, New Brunswick.
- Coordinates: 46.665°N 67.1725°W
- Country: Canada
- Province: New Brunswick
- County: Carleton
- Erected: 1821

Area
  - Land: 839.76 km^{2} (324.23 sq mi)

Population (2021)
  - Total: 1,966
  - Density: 2.3/km^{2} (6.0/sq mi)
  - Change 2016-2021: ▼8.7%
  - Dwellings: 906
- Time zone: UTC-4 (AST)
  - Summer (DST): UTC-3 (ADT)
- Figures do not include portions with the town of Florenceville-Bristol and the village of Bath

Kent is a geographic parish in the northeastern corner of Carleton County, New Brunswick, Canada.

Prior to the 2023 governance reform, for governance purposes it was divided between one village, two local service districts, and part of one town, all of which were members of the Western Valley Regional Service Commission (WVRSC).

The Census subdivision of Kent Parish includes all of the geographic parish except the two municipalities.

== Origin of name ==
The parish was named in memory of the Duke of Kent, father of Queen Victoria.

== History ==
Kent was erected in 1821 within York County from "all that part of the County of York lying above the Parish of Wakefield, on both sides of the River Saint John," territory previously unassigned to any parish. This sweeping description included modern Kent Parish, Wicklow Parish, Aberdeen Parish, parts of Brighton, Peel, and Stanley Parishes; Madawaska County; most of Victoria County; the western part of Restigouche County; and parts of Maine and Quebec then claimed by New Brunswick.

== Boundaries ==
Kent Parish is bounded:

- on the west by the Saint John River;
- on the north by Victoria County;
- on the south and east by a line running due east from opposite the mouth of Whitemarsh Brook to a reserved road along the western line of grants on the Ketchum Ridge Road, then north along reserved roads on the western side of land grants along the Ketchum Ridge, West Glassville, Old West Glassville, Shikatehawk, and Denney Hill Roads to the north line of a grant south of the junction of the Denney Hill and Burke Roads, running briefly northeasterly to the northwestern corner of a lot west of the end of Kenneth Road before turning due east and running to the York County line, then running northeast along York County until it meets the Victoria County line.

=== Evolution of boundaries ===
Kent's 1821 boundaries gave it all of the province west of Northumberland County, including the province's claims to northern Maine and parts of Québec.

In 1832 Kent was included in the newly erected Carleton County; The eastern county line cut through Kent Parish.

In 1833 the sheer size of Kent Parish lead to it being split into five parishes. Wicklow and Andover comprised all of the parish west of the Saint John River, Perth all of Kent east of the Saint John between the modern county line and Grand Falls, and Madawaska all of Kent north of Grand Falls; the orphaned area in York County became unassigned land in that county. Kent retained its modern territory plus Aberdeen Parish and eastern Peel and Brighton Parishes.

In 1841 the southern boundary of Brighton Parish was changed, causing a change in its northern boundary due to its wording, (Note: Such implicit boundary changes were not rare; Northumberland County's boundary changes in 1787, 1803, and 1837 were all based on the changing western boundary of Westmorland County.) removing all of modern Brighton and Peel Parishes and southern Aberdeen.

In 1850 the northern line was rotated to run due east from the mouth of the River de Chute. Kent gained a small area on the bank of the Saint John but lost a large triangle of territory that included the modern communities of Chapmanville, Kilfoil, Killoween, Maplehurst, and Moose Mountain.

In 1863 the southeastern part of Kent formed the bulk of Aberdeen Parish, removing Glassville and Knowlesville Settlements.

In 1864 the original northern line of Carleton County was restored, reversing the 1850 changes.

In 1896 the boundary with Aberdeen Parish underwent minor changes, taking a long narrow triangle of territory from Kent.

In 1956 a stretch of Crown Reserved Road (Note: A Crown Reserved Road is a piece of land between tiers of land grants that the government held back when surveying blocks of grants. The fate of these roads ranges from modern paved roads to lines on maps of land that was never cleared.) along the western boundary of Aberdeen Parish was transferred to Kent, possibly in error. (Note: The 1896 rewrite of the province's county and parish boundaries introduced two wording errors into the boundaries of Aberdeen Parish; these were corrected in 1956. Aberdeen's boundary ran along the eastern line of a Crown Reserved Road farther south and there may have been an assumption that the boundary was meant to run along the eastern line of the northern Crown Reserved Road as well.)

== Municipalities ==
The town of Florenceville-Bristol occupies the southwestern corner of the parish along the Saint John River.

The village of Bath comprises an irregular area along the Saint John River south of the Monquart Stream.

== Local service districts ==
Both LSDs assessed for the basic LSD services of fire protection, police services, land use planning, emergency measures, and dog control.

=== Kent Parish ===
The local service district of the parish of Kent originally comprised all of the parish outside the villages of Bath and Bristol.

It was established on 23 November 1966 to assess for fire protection following the abolition of county governments by the new Municipalities Act. Community services were added on 20 December 1967 and non-fire related rescue on 23 October 2015.

In 2020, the LSD additionally assesses for community & recreation services. The taxing authority was 209.00 Kent.

LSD advisory committee: Yes, as of September 2017. Chair Alma Kilfoil served on the WVRSC board from at least 2015 until her resignation on 30 September 2017.

=== Upper Kent ===
Upper Kent comprised a narrow strip along the Saint John River around the community of Upper Kent.

It was established on 27 June 1968 to add street lighting, community planning, and garbage collection. Non-fire related rescue was added on 23 October 2015.

In 2020, Upper Kent additionally assesses for street lighting and community & recreation services. The taxing authority was 220.00 Upper Kent.

LSD advisory committee: unknown

== Communities ==
Communities at least partly within the parish. bold indicates an incorporated municipality

- **Bath**
- Beaufort
- Beechwood
- Carlow
- Chapmanville
- Clearview
- Fielding
- **Florenceville-Bristol**
- Giberson Settlement
- Gordonsville
- Halls Corner
- Holmesville
- Johnville
- Kenneth
- Kilfoil
- Killoween
- Lockharts Mill
- Maplehurst
- Mineral
- Monquart
- Moose Mountain
- Murphy Corner
- Piercemont
- River de Chute Siding
- South Johnville
- Tarrtown
- Upper Kent
- Welch

== Bodies of water ==
Bodies of water (Note: Not including brooks, ponds or coves.) at least partly within the parish.

- Odell River
- Saint John River
- North Branch Southwest Miramichi River
- Dyer Branch
- Little Shikatehawk Stream
- Monquart Stream
- Shikatehawk Stream
- Beaver Brook Lake
- Green Lake
- Lost Lake
- Moose Mountain Lake
- Murphy Lake
- Priest Lake

== Other notable places ==
Parks, historic sites, and other noteworthy places at least partly within the parish.

- Beechwood Dam
- Bristol Aerodrome
- McCluskey Brook Protected Natural Area
- Porcupine Mountain Protected Natural Area
- Upper Kent Aerodrome

== Demographics ==
Parish population total does not include Bath and portion within Florenceville-Bristol

=== Population ===
**Population trend**

Census	Population	Change (%)
2016	2,153	▼4.0%
2011	2,242	▼5.0%
2006	2,361	▼4.7%
2001	2,478	▼2.7%
1996	2,547	▲2.9%
1991	2,475	N/A

=== Language ===
**Mother tongue (2016)**

Language	Population	Pct (%)
English only	2,110	97.9%
French only	25	1.2%
Other languages	15	0.7%
Both English and French	5	0.2%

== See also ==
- List of parishes in New Brunswick
