= Carleton County, New Brunswick =

County in New Brunswick, Canada

Coordinates: 46°21′N 67°19′W

Carleton
- County
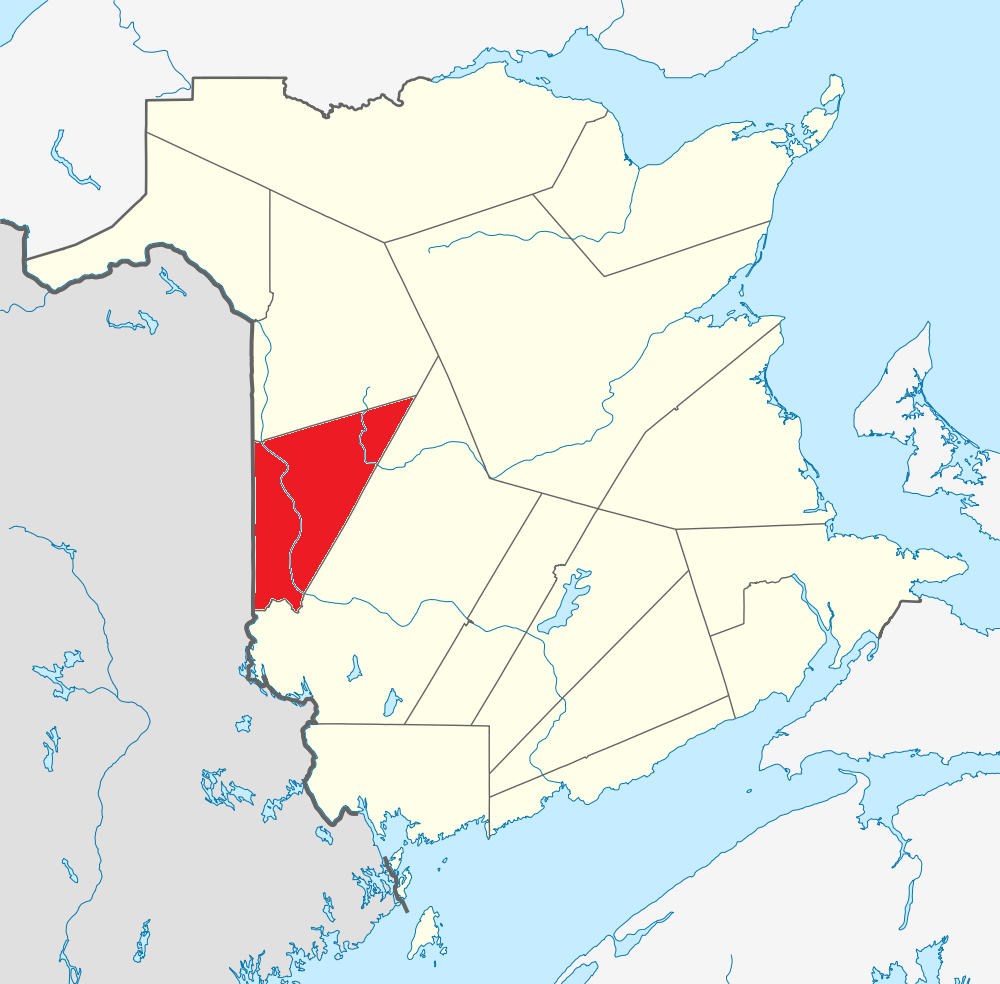
- Location within New Brunswick.
- Country: Canada
- Province: New Brunswick
- Established: 1831
- Electoral Districts Federal: Tobique—Mactaquac
- Provincial: Woodstock-Hartland & Carleton-Victoria

Area
  - Land: 3,309.06 km^{2} (1,277.64 sq mi)

Population (2021)
  - Total: 26,360
  - Density: 8/km^{2} (21/sq mi)
  - Pop 2016-2021: ▲0.7%
  - Dwellings: 11,865
- Time zone: UTC-4 (AST)
  - Summer (DST): UTC-3 (ADT)
- Area code: 506

Carleton County (2021 population 26,360) is located in west-central New Brunswick, Canada.

The western border is Aroostook County, Maine, the northern border is Victoria County, and the southeastern border is York County from which it was formed in 1831. The Saint John River bisects the western section of the county. The Southwest Miramichi River flows through the eastern section of the county. Potato farming is a major industry. The scenic town of Hartland is home to the longest covered bridge in the world.

== Transportation ==
=== Major highways ===
- Route 2 (TCH)
- Route 95
- Route 103
- Route 104
- Route 105
- Route 107
- Route 110
- Route 130
- Route 165
- Route 540
- Route 550
- Route 555
- Route 560
- Route 565
- Route 570
- Route 575
- Route 580
- Route 585
- Route 590
- Route 595

== Census subdivisions ==
=== Communities ===
There are five incorporated municipalities within Carleton County (listed by 2021 population):

| Official name | Designation | Area km^{2} | Population | Parish |
|---|---|---|---|---|
| Woodstock | Town | 14.96 | 5,553 | Woodstock |
| Florenceville-Bristol | Town | 15.74 | 1,573 | Simonds |
| Hartland | Town | 9.50 | 933 | Brighton |
| Centreville | Village | 2.67 | 508 | Wicklow |
| Bath | Village | 2.00 | 440 | Kent |

=== First Nations ===
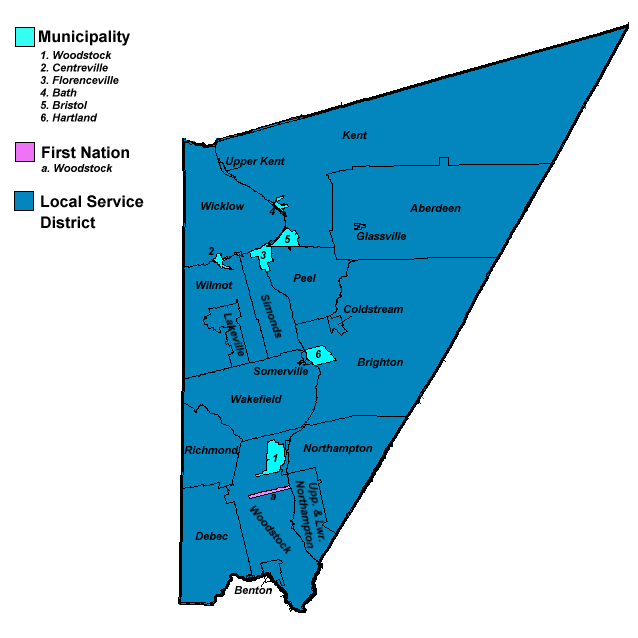
Map of pre–2023 reform governance units in Carleton County.

There is one First Nations reserve in Carleton County, the Woodstock First Nation:

| Official name | Designation | Area km^{2} | Population | Parish |
|---|---|---|---|---|
| Woodstock 23 | Reserve | 1.80 | 435 | Woodstock |

=== Parishes ===
The county is subdivided into eleven parishes (listed by 2021 population):

| Official name | Area km^{2} | Population | municipalities | Unincorporated communities |
|---|---|---|---|---|
| Wakefield | 196.31 | 2,722 | | Belleville / Briggs Corner / Hartford / Iron Ore Hill / Jackson Falls / Jacksontown / Jacksonville / Lindsay / Lower Wakefield / Lower Waterville / McKenna / Oakville / Rosedale / Somerville / South Greenfield / South Wakefield / Upper Waterville / Victoria Corner / Wakefield / Waterville |
| Woodstock | 194.83 | 2,219 | Woodstock (town); Woodstock 23 (reserve) | Beardsley Road / Bedell / Benton / Bulls Creek / Dibblee / Hillman / Indian Village / Mapledale / Porten Settlement / Riceville / River Road / Speerville / Springfield / Teeds Mills / Townsview Estates / Upper Southampton / Upper Woodstock / Valley |
| Kent | 839.76 | 1,966 | Bath (village) | Beaufort / Beechwood / Carlow / Chapmanville / Clearview / Giberson Settlement / Gordonsville / Haut-Kent / Holmesville / Johnville / Kenneth / Kent / Kilfoil / Killoween / Lockharts Mill / Maplehurst / Monquart / Moose Mountain / Murphy Corner / Piercemont / River de Chute Siding / South Johnville / Summit / Tarrtown / Upper Kent / Haut-Kent / Welch |
| Brighton | 509.30 | 1,596 | Hartland (town) | Armond / Ashland / Briggs Corner / Brighton / Carlisle / Cloverdale / Coldstream / East Brighton / East Cloverdale / Esdraelon / Howard Brook / Jericho / Lower Brighton / Lower Windsor / Mainstream / Mountain View / Pole Hill / Shewan / Simonds / South Knowlesville / Windsor |
| Northampton | 243.31 | 1,875 | | Carr / East Newbridge / Grafton / Grafton Hill / Harten Corner / Kilmarnock / Lower Northampton / Newbridge / Newburg / Northampton / Pembroke / South Newbridge / Upper Northampton |
| Wicklow | 195.50 | 1,591 | Centreville (village) | Clearview / Gregg Settlement / Hartley Settlement / Knoxford / Lamoreaux Corner / Listerville / Lower Greenfield / McGrath Corner / McMonagle Corner / Middle Greenfield / Royalton / Summerfield / Thomas Corner / Tracey Mills / Tweedie / Upper Knoxford / Upper Royalton / Upper Wicklow / Wakem Corner / Wicklow |
| Richmond | 258.80 | 1,456 | | Blackies Landing / Blowdown / Campbell Settlement / Debec / Elmwood / Elmwood Station / Green Road / Hodgdon Road / Irish Settlement / Kirkland / Limestone / McKenzie Corner / Monument / Oak Mountain / Plymouth / Richmond / Richmond Corner / Union Corner / Watson Settlement / Wickham |
| Peel | 112.74 | 1,198 | | Buckwheat Brook / East Coldstream / Lansdowne / Mount Pleasant / Oakland / Peel / Riverbank / South Gordonsville / Stickney |
| Wilmot | 191.40 | 969 | | Avondale / Beckim Settlement / Bloomfield / Bradley Corner / Brookville / Carvell / Charleston / Deerville / Digby Corner / Good Corner / Lakeville / Long Settlement / Lower Bloomfield / McKeaghan / Weston / Wilmot |
| Aberdeen | 444.88 | 812 | | Aberdeen / Argyle / Biggar Ridge / Centre Glassville / Divide / East Glassville / East Knowlesville / Foreston / Glassville / Hayden Ridge / Hemphill Corner / Highlands / Juniper / Juniper Station / Ketchum Ridge / Knowlesville / MacIntosh Mill / North Ridge / South Ridge / West Glassville |
| Simonds | 75.57 | 514 | Florenceville-Bristol (town) | Carleton / Connell / Flanagan Hill / Hunters Corner / Simonds / St. Thomas / Strong Corner / Upper Brighton |

== Demographics ==
As a census division in the 2021 Census of Population conducted by Statistics Canada, Carleton County had a population of 26,360 living in 11,120 of its 11,865 total private dwellings, a change of 0.7% from its 2016 population of 26,178. With a land area of 3,309.06 km^{2} (1,277.64 sq mi), it had a population density of 8.0/km^{2} (20.6/sq mi) in 2021.

Population trend

| Census | Population | Change (%) |
|---|---|---|
| 2021 | 26,360 | ▲0.7% |
| 2016 | 26,220 | ▼3.0% |
| 2011 | 27,019 | ▲1.5% |
| 2006 | 26,632 | ▼2.0% |
| 2001 | 27,184 | ▲1.0% |
| 1996 | 26,910 | ▲3.4% |
| 1991 | 26,026 | N/A |
| 1951 | 22,269 | N/A |

Mother tongue language (2021)

| Language | Population | Pct (%) |
|---|---|---|
| English only | 24,290 | 93.33% |
| French only | 400 | 1.54% |
| Non-official languages | 1,125 | 4.32% |
| Multiple responses | 215 | 0.83% |

== See also ==
- List of communities in New Brunswick
