= Wakefield Parish, New Brunswick =

Wakefield
- Parish
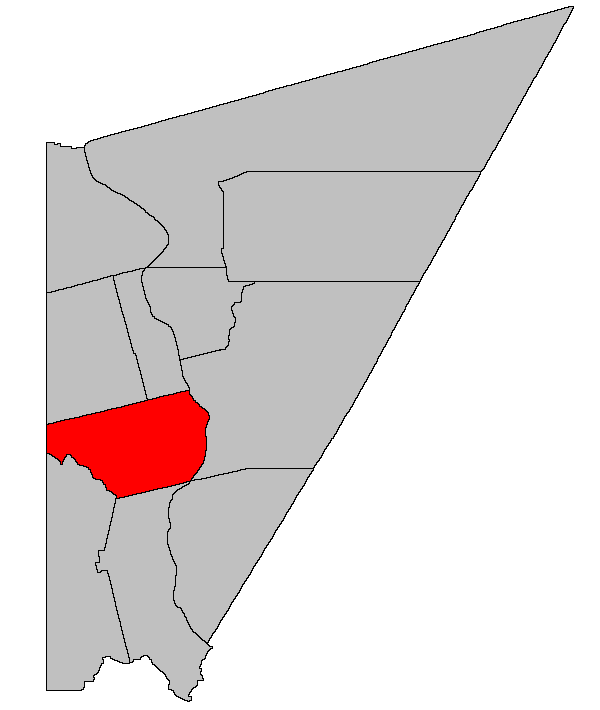
- Location within Carleton County, New Brunswick
- Coordinates: 46.225°N 67.52°W
- Country: Canada
- Province: New Brunswick
- County: Carleton
- Erected: 1803

Area
  - Land: 196.31 km^{2} (75.80 sq mi)

Population (2021)
  - Total: 2,722
  - Density: 13.9/km^{2} (36/sq mi)
  - Change 2016-2021: ▼1.6%
  - Dwellings: 1,191
- Time zone: UTC-4 (AST)
  - Summer (DST): UTC-3 (ADT)

Wakefield is a geographic parish in Carleton County, New Brunswick, Canada, located north on the west bank of the Saint John River north of Woodstock.

Prior to the 2023 governance reform, for governance purposes it was comprised two local service districts and part of a third, all of which were members of the Western Valley Regional Service Commission (WVRSC).

The Census subdivision of Wakefield Parish shares the geographic parish's borders.

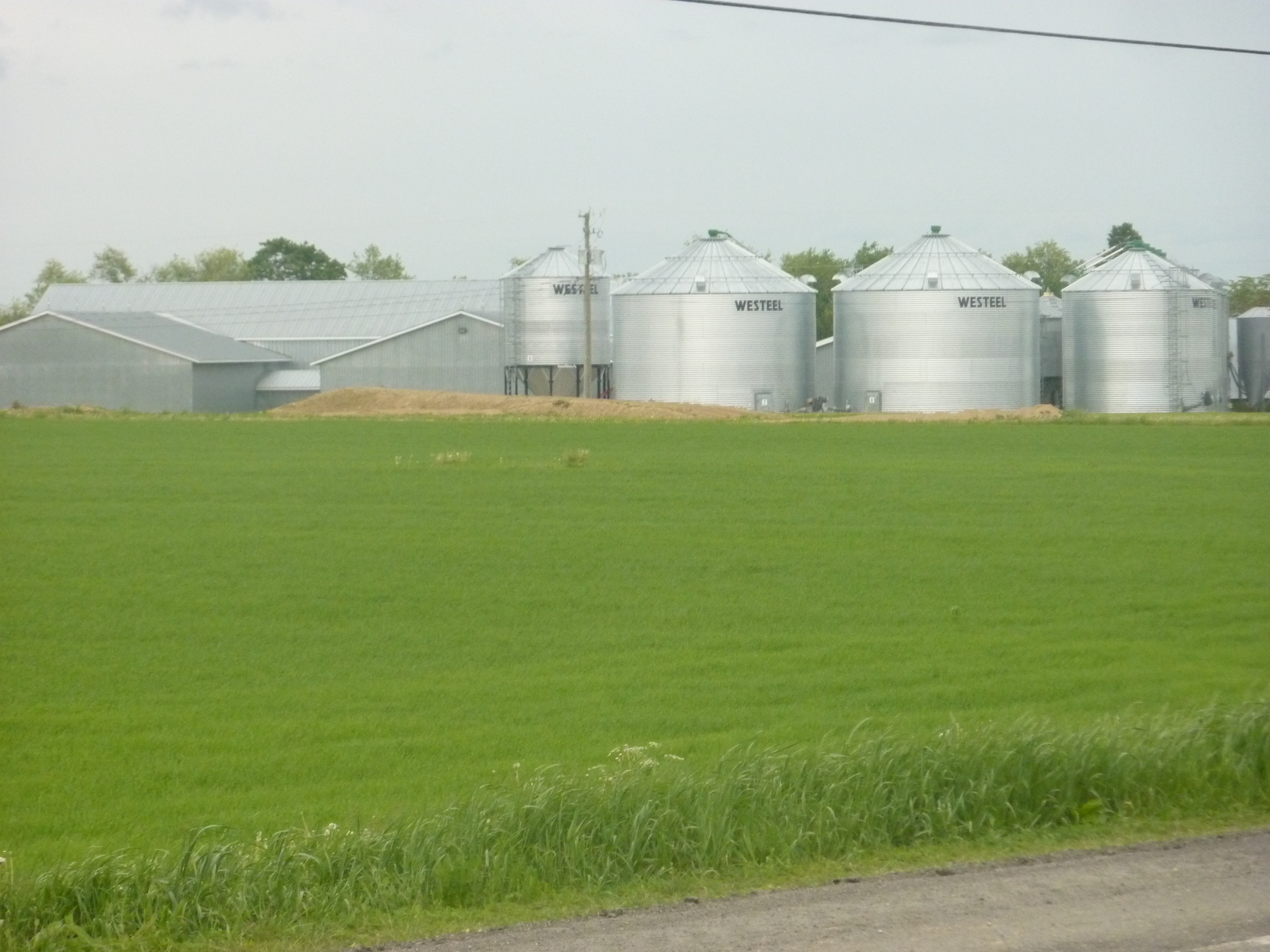
Farm in Jacksonville

== Origin of name ==
The parish may have been named for the city of Wakefield in Yorkshire, England.

Historian William Francis Ganong noted that the name predated the parish's erection, appearing in 1801 in the Land Memorials.

== History ==
Wakefield was erected in 1803 within York County from unassigned lands north of Woodstock and Northampton Parishes. It included Simonds and Wilmot Parishes, along with parts of Bright, Brighton, Northampton, Peel, Richmond, Southampton, Wicklow, and Woodstock Parishes as well as part of Maine claimed by New Brunswick.

== Boundaries ==
Wakefield Parish is bounded:

- on the north by the southern line of a land grant at the mouth of the Little Presque Isle Stream and its prolongation to the international border;
- on the east by the Saint John River;
- on the south by the southern line of a land grant on the Saint John River, opposite the junction of Route 105 and Newburg Road, prolonged to the Meduxnekeag River, and then the river to the international border;
- and on the west by Maine.
- It also includes all islands in front of it in the Saint John River. Whether the southern boundary extends through Pine Island or around it is not made clear by either the Territorial Division Act or the New Brunswick cadastral grant map of the area.

=== Evolution of boundaries ===
Wakefield originally extended north from Woodstock and Northampton Parishes to the mouth of Whitemarsh Creek and a point on the opposite side of the Saint John River, with its northern boundaries paralleling the two parishes to its south. Neither eastern nor western boundary was explicitly mentioned, simply "all that tract of country in the County of York" between the southern and northern boundaries of Wakefield.

In 1830 all of Wakefield east of the channel of the Saint John River was erected as Brighton Parish. This put at least one island in each parish.

In 1838 all of Wakefield south of the Meduxnekeag River was transferred to Woodstock Parish.

In 1842 the northern part of Wakefield was erected as Simonds Parish. Simonds included Wilmot Parish and a small part of Wicklow Parish. Later the same year New Brunswick's land boundary with Maine was settled by the Webster–Ashburton Treaty, ending Wakefield's implicit claim to part of Maine.

In 1850 the boundary within the Saint John River was altered, making all islands in front of Wakefield part of the parish.

In 1854 the southern boundary of Wakefield was extended across the Meduxnekeag to include parts of two grants that straddled the river.

== Local service districts ==
All local service districts assessed for the basic LSD services of fire protection, police services, land use planning, emergency measures, and dog control.

=== Wakefield Parish ===
The local service district of the parish of Wakefield originally comprised the entire parish. In 2020, the LSD was divided into two taxing authorities, the larger Wakefield (Inside) including most of the LSD and Wakefield (Outside) in the northeastern part of the LSD, containing the communities of Victoria Corner and Waterville.

The parish LSD was established in 1966 to assess for fire protection. Community services were added in 1967. Recreational services were added in 1985 to the new taxing authority of Wakefield Inside.

In 2020, both taxing authorities assess for community & recreational services. The taxing authorities were 215.00 Wakefield (Inside) and 215.01 Wakefield (Outside).

LSD advisory committee: Unknown.

=== Somerville ===
Somerville comprised a rough triangle around Route 103, Route 130, and the Somerville Road with an extension south along Route 103.

Somerville was established in 1971 to add street lighting and first aid & ambulance services; community services were removed, probably in error. Community services were restored and first aid & ambulance services removed in the rewrite of the LSD regulation in 1974.

In 2020, Somerville assessed for street lighting. The taxing authority was 222.00 Somerville.

LSDAC: Unknown.

=== Lakeville ===
Lakeville included a single land grant in Wakefield Parish, located on the western side Route 560, north of the prolongation of the Estey Road.

== Communities ==
Communities at least partly within the parish;

- Belleville
- Briggs Corner
- Hartford
- Jackson Falls
- Jacksontown
- Jacksonville
- Lindsay
- Lower Wakefield
- Lower Waterville
- McKenna
- Oakville
- Rosedale
- Somerville
- South Greenfield
- Upper Waterville
- Victoria Corner
- Wakefield
- Waterville

== Bodies of water ==
Bodies of water (Note: Not including brooks, ponds or coves.) at least partly in the parish:

- Meduxnekeag River
- Saint John River
- Little Presque Isle Stream
- Lanes Creek
- Bennetts Lake
- Cox Lake
- Mud Lake
- Payson Lake
- York Lake

== Other notable places ==
Parks, historic sites, and other noteworthy places at least partly in the parish.

- Iron Ore Hill
- Meduxnekeag Valley Protected Natural Area

== Demographics ==
=== Population ===
Population trend

Census	Population	Change (%)
2016	2,767	▼1.7%
2011	2,814	▲4.1%
2006	2,703	▲1.7%
2001	2,657	0.0%
1996	2,658	▼0.3%
1991	2,665	N/A

=== Language ===
Mother tongue (2016)

Language	Population	Pct (%)
English only	2,650	95.7%
French only	40	1.4%
Both English and French	10	0.4%
Other languages	70	2.5%

== See also ==
- List of parishes in New Brunswick
