= McGrath Corner, New Brunswick =

Coordinates: 46°29′N 67°44′W

McGrath Corner is a community in the Canadian province of New Brunswick, located in Wicklow Parish in the county of Carleton.

It is located 1.85 km (1.15 mi) south of Knoxford, on the road to Centreville.

== See also ==
- List of communities in New Brunswick
