= Brighton Parish, New Brunswick =

Brighton
- Parish
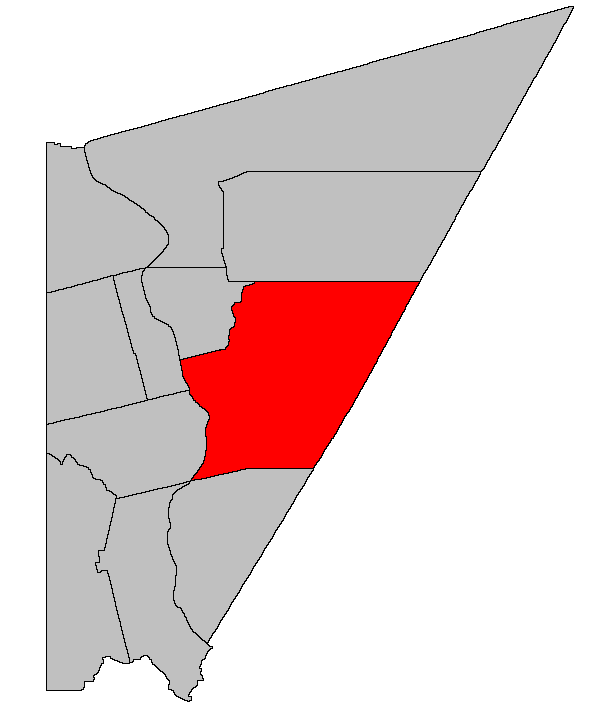
- Location within Carleton County, New Brunswick
- Coordinates: 46.355°N 67.36°W
- Country: Canada
- Province: New Brunswick
- County: Carleton
- Erected: 1830

Area
  - Land: 509.30 km^{2} (196.64 sq mi)

Population (2021)
  - Total: 1,596
  - Density: 3.1/km^{2} (8.0/sq mi)
  - Change 2016-2021: ▼8.0%
  - Dwellings: 773
- Time zone: UTC-4 (AST)
  - Summer (DST): UTC-3 (ADT)
- Figures do not include portion within the town of Hartland

Brighton is a geographic parish in Carleton County, New Brunswick, Canada, northeast of Woodstock, extending from the eastern bank of the Saint John River to the York County line.

Prior to the 2023 governance reform, for governance purposes it was comprised one town and two local service districts, all of which were members of the Western Valley Regional Service Commission (WVRSC).

The Census subdivision of Brighton Parish included all of the geographic parish except the town of Hartland.

== Origin of name ==
The origin of the parish's name is not certain.

== History ==
Brighton was erected in 1830 within York County from all of Wakefield Parish east of the channel of the Saint John River. It contained parts of modern Bright, Northampton, Peel, and Southampton Parishes.

== Boundaries ==
Brighton Parish is bounded:

- on the west by the Saint John River;
- on the northwest by the prolongation of the north line of a land grant north of Hales Brook to the Cold Stream, then upstream to the southern line of grants near the junction of Black Road and East Coldstream Road;
- on the north by the southern line of those grants prolonged east to the county line;
- on the east by York County;
- on the south by a line beginning north of Shaws Creek and running southeast nearly to the southern line of the grant that includes the mouth of Shaws Creek, then easterly along property and grant lines to the boundary of the Becaguimec Game Management Area, then easterly to the county line.

=== Evolution of boundaries ===
Brighton was erected with very different boundaries than it has today. The northeastern and southwestern boundaries of the parish were based on the 1786 northeastern boundary of Northampton, with Brighton's northeastern boundary parallel to Northampton's and starting opposite the Whitemarsh Creek. The wording of Northampton's boundary, which started 12 miles (19 km) inland along the Queensbury Parish line, was by a line running from thence north-westerly to the mouth of a river which discharges into the river Saint John, at the upper boundary of block number seven, about two miles and a quarter above the upper end of Pine Island, (Note: Usage of long s modernised for readability.) describing an endpoint in a stretch of shoreline with no waterway large enough to be named on modern provincial maps. If the Pine Island named is actually the next island downriver of modern Pine Island (Sharps Island, formerly Indian Island) then Shaws Creek is in the right place to be the mentioned river.

In 1833 the county line of the newly erected Carleton County ran through Brighton Parish, leaving part of the parish in York County. The legislation that erected new parishes from the orphaned parts of Northampton and Woodstock Parishes did not mention Brighton Parish.

By 1841 the ambiguity of the boundary with Northampton Parish caused the parish line to be changed to run true east from the mouth of Shaws Creek to the county line, indicating that Brighton only extended as far as a prolongation of the Northampton Parish line. The new parish line ran south of its present course, cutting through modern Newburg. The northern boundary would also have been altered due to the existing wording of Brighton's boundaries, taking a large piece of Kent Parish that included the modern communities of Armond, East Coldstream, Esdraelon, Hemphill Corner, South Gordonsville, South Knowlesville, and Windsor.

In 1850 the presumptive changes in the northern and eastern boundaries were confirmed. All islands in the Saint John River were explicitly removed from the parish, changing the earlier boundary based on which side of the channel an island fell on.

In 1859 the northwestern part of the parish was erected as Peel Parish, with the Cold Stream forming the western boundary of the new parish.

In 1862 the boundary with Northampton was moved to its present location, transferring the area of Newburg Road and Cape Road to Northampton. Wording changes in 1896 and 1952 clarified the boundary but did not change it.

In 1863 a strip on the northern edge of Brighton including Hemphill Corner was included in the newly erected Aberdeen Parish.

== Municipality ==
The town of Hartland stretches from the just north of the mouth of the Becaguimec Stream to Route 575.

== Local service districts ==
Both LSDs assessed for the basic LSD services of fire protection, police services, land use planning, emergency measures, and dog control.

=== Brighton Parish ===
The local service district of the parish of Brighton originally comprised all of the parish outside of Hartland.

The LSD was established on 23 November 1966 to assess for fire protection following the abolition of county municipalities under the new Municipalities Act. Community services were added on 20 December 1967 and first aid & ambulance services on 14 October 1970.

In 2020, the LSD additionally assessed for community & recreation services. The taxing authority was 208.00 Brighton.

LSD advisory committee: Yes. Chair Brent Pearson sat on the WVRSC board in 2015, 2016, and in late 2017 as a replacement. New Chair Tina Pelkey sat on the WVRSC board from July 2018.

=== Coldstream ===
The local service district of Coldstream comprised an irregular area around the community of Coldstream at the mouth of the Cold Stream.

The LSD was established on 14 October 1970 to add street lighting.

In 2020, the LSD additionally assesses for both street lighting and community & recreation services. The taxing authority was 221.00 Coldstream.

LSD advisory committee: unknown

== Communities ==
Communities at least partly within the parish; bold indicates an incorporated municipality

- Armond
- Ashland
- Bannon
- Briggs Corner
- Carlisle
- Cloverdale
- Coldstream
- East Brighton
- East Cloverdale
- East Coldstream
- Esdraelon
- Hale
- **Hartland**
- Howard Brook
- Jericho
- Lower Brighton
- Lower Windsor
- Mainstream
- McKenna
- Mountain View
- Pole Hill
- Shewan
- South Knowlesville
- Upper Brighton
- Windsor

== Bodies of water ==
Bodies of water (Note: Not including brooks, ponds or coves.) at least partly in the parish:

- Nashwaak River
- Saint John River
- Becaguimec Stream
- Cold Stream
- Nackawic Stream
- Ackers Creek
- Cross Creek
- Deep Creek
- Angle Hill Lake
- Doughboy Lake
- Little Doughboy Lakes
- Long Lake
- Malcolm Lake
- Mud Lake
- Silver Lake

== Other notable places ==
Parks, historic sites, and other noteworthy places at least partly in the parish.

- Becaguimec Stream Protected Natural Area
- Becaguimec Wildlife Management Area
- East Cloverdale Protected Natural Area
- Golden Ridge Protected Natural Area
- Howard Brook Protected Natural Area
- Welch Brook Protected Natural Area

== Demographics ==
Parish population total does not include former incorporated town of Hartland. Revised census figures based on the 2023 local governance reforms have not been released.

=== Population ===
**Population trend**

Census	Population	Change (%)
2016	1,735	▼1.6%
2011	1,764	▼3.8%
2006	1,834	▼3.0%
2001	1,891	▼1.4%
1996	1,918	▲1.8%
1991	1,885	N/A

=== Language ===
**Mother tongue (2016)**

Language	Population	Pct (%)
English only	1,665	96.0%
French only	25	1.4%
Both English and French	0	0.0%
Other languages	45	2.6%

== See also ==
- List of parishes in New Brunswick
