= Simonds Parish, Carleton County, New Brunswick =

Simonds
- Parish
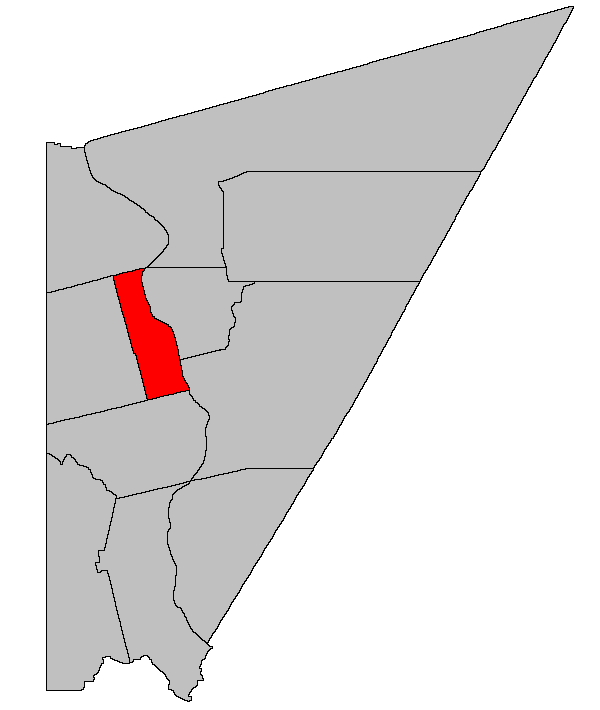
- Location within Carleton County, New Brunswick
- Coordinates: 46.3275°N 67.5525°W
- Country: Canada
- Province: New Brunswick
- County: Carleton
- Erected: 1842

Area
  - Land: 75.57 km^{2} (29.18 sq mi)

Population (2021)
  - Total: 514
  - Density: 6.8/km^{2} (18/sq mi)
  - Change 2016-2021: ▲8.7%
  - Dwellings: 220
- Time zone: UTC-4 (AST)
  - Summer (DST): UTC-3 (ADT)
- Figures do not include portion within the town of Florenceville-Bristol

Simonds is a geographic parish in Carleton County, New Brunswick, Canada, located north of Woodstock on the western bank of the Saint John River.

Prior to the 2023 governance reform, for governance purposes it was comprised one local service district and part of one town, both of which were members of the Western Valley Regional Service Commission (WVRSC).

The Census subdivision of Simonds Parish includes all of the geographic parish except the town of Florenceville-Bristol.

== Origin of name ==
The parish may have been named in honour of Charles Simonds, Speaker of the House of Assembly when the parish was erected, or his family, who were prominent in the early history of the province.

== History ==
Simonds was erected in 1842 from northern Wakefield Parish. It included Wilmot Parish, a narrow wedge of Wicklow Parish, and part of Maine claimed by New Brunswick.

== Boundaries ==
Simonds Parish is bounded:

- on the north by the northern line of land grant at the mouth of Whitemarsh Creek and its prolongation;
- on the east by the Saint John River;
- on the south by the southern line of a land grant at the mouth of the Little Presque Isle Stream and its prolongation;
- and on the west by two reserved lines running east of the Charleston Road and west of or along the Mount Delight and Wilmot Roads.
- The parish also includes the islands in front of it in the Saint John River.

=== Evolution of boundaries ===
Simonds inherited a northern boundary that began at the mouth of Whitemarsh Creek and ran westerly along a line parallel to that of Woodstock Parish, which ran closer to due west than today's line. The western line was implicitly changed a few months after its erection by the Webster–Ashburton Treaty which settled the remainder of New Brunswick's land boundaries with Maine.

In 1850 the consolidation of legislation setting New Brunswick's internal boundaries moved the northern line of Simonds more than a kilometre upriver to the northern line of a grant to Henry M. Green and its prolongation westward, a line which also ran more steeply to the south than the original line. This added a strip of Wicklow Parish that included the northern part of Centreville.

In 1869 the western polling district of Simonds, created in 1867, was erected as Wilmot Parish.

In 1870 the northern boundary was moved south to its current location, transferring territory to Wicklow Parish.

== Municipality ==
The town of Florenceville-Bristol is located at the northeastern corner of the parish, along the Saint John River.

== Local service district ==
The local service district of the parish of Simonds comprised all of the parish that is not part of Florenceville-Bristol.

The LSD was established in 1966 to assess for fire protection. Community services were added in 1967.

In 2020, Simonds assessed for community & recreation services in addition to the basic LSD services of fire protection, police services, land use planning, emergency measures, and dog control. The taxing authority was 214.00 Simonds.

LSD advisory committee: Yes, as of 2018. Chair Tena McLellan sat on the WVRSC board of directors from August 2016 until June 2018.

== Communities ==
Communities at least partly within the parish. bold indicates an incorporated municipality

- Connell
- **Florenceville-Bristol**
- Hunters Corner
- St. Thomas
- Simonds
- Strong Corner
- Wilmot

== Bodies of water ==
Bodies of water (Note: Not including brooks, ponds or coves.) at least partly within the parish.

- Saint John River
- Big Presque Isle Stream
- Little Presque Isle Stream

== Islands ==
Islands at least partly within the parish.

- Becaguimec Island
- Lower Presque Isle Island

== Other notable places ==
Parks, historic sites, and other noteworthy places at least partly within the parish.

- Florenceville Airport

== Demographics ==
Parish population total does not include portion within Florenceville-Bristol

=== Population ===
**Population trend**

Census	Population	Change (%)
2016	473	▼16.3%
2011	565	▲15.5%
2006	489	▼13.8%
2001	567	▼5.8%
1996	602	▼4.6%
1991	631	N/A

=== Language ===
**Mother tongue language (2016)**

Language	Population	Pct (%)
English only	460	96.8%
French only	5	1.1%
Other languages	10	2.1%
Both English and French	0	0.00%

== See also ==
- List of parishes in New Brunswick
