= Wilmot Parish =

Wilmot
- Parish
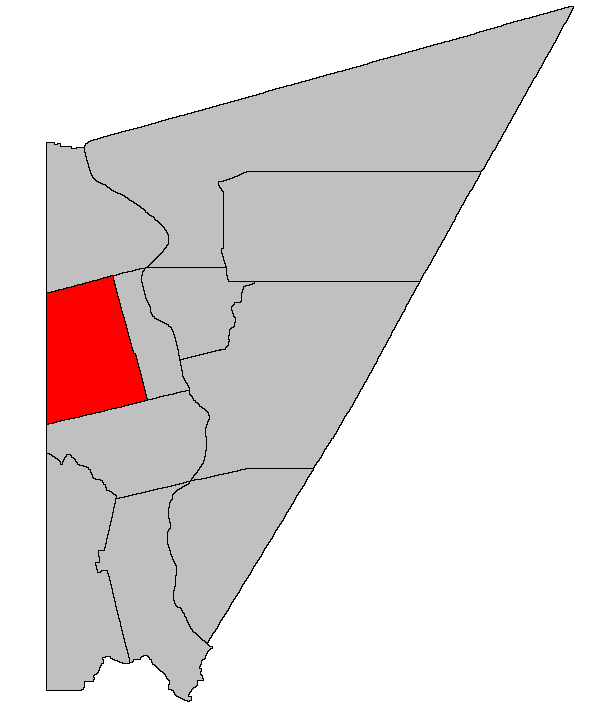
- Location within Carleton County, New Brunswick
- Coordinates: 46.31°N 67.615°W
- Country: Canada
- Province: New Brunswick
- County: Carleton
- Erected: 1869

Area
  - Land: 191.40 km^{2} (73.90 sq mi)

Population (2021)
  - Total: 969
  - Density: 5.1/km^{2} (13/sq mi)
  - Change 2016-2021: ▼5.2%
  - Dwellings: 412
- Time zone: UTC-4 (AST)
  - Summer (DST): UTC-3 (ADT)
- Figures do not include portion within the village of Centreville

Wilmot is a geographic parish in Carleton County, New Brunswick, Canada, located along the international border northwest of Woodstock.

Prior to the 2023 governance reform, for governance purposes it was comprised one local service district, part of one village, and part of another LSD, all of which were members of the Western Valley Regional Service Commission (WVRSC).

The Census subdivision of Wilmot Parish includes all of the geographic parish except the village.

== Origin of name ==
The parish was named in honour of Lemuel Allan Wilmot, Lieutenant Governor of New Brunswick at the time of its erection.

== History ==
Wilmot was erected in 1869 from the western polling district of Simonds Parish and originally included part of Wicklow Parish.

== Boundaries ==
Wilmot Parish is bounded:

- on the west by the international border;
- on the north by the prolongation of a land grant at the mouth of Whitemarsh Brook to the international border;
- on the east by two reserved lines running east of the Charleston Road and west of or along the Mount Delight and Wilmot Roads;
- and on the south by the prolongation of the southern line of a land grant at the mouth of the Little Presque Isle Stream to the international border.

=== Evolution of boundaries ===
Wilmot originally a strip of southern Wicklow Parish more than a kilometre wide. This included the northern part of Centreville.

In 1870 the northern boundary was moved south to its present position.

== Municipality ==
The village of Centreville extends along the Big Presque Isle Stream from the northern parish line to the former railway.

== Local service districts ==
Both local service districts assessed for the basic LSD services of fire protection, police services, land use planning, emergency measures, and dog control.

=== Wilmot Parish ===
The local service district of the parish of Wilmot originally comprised all of the parish outside Centreville.

The parish LSD was established in 1966 to assess for fire protection. Community services were added in 1967.

In 2020, the LSD assesses for only basic services. The taxing authority was 217.00 Wilmot.

LSD advisory committee: Unknown.

=== Lakeville ===
Lakeville comprised an area on the eastern and northern shores of Williamstown Lake, extending north and south along Route 560, west along Brookville Road, and north along Good Corner Road; it also includes a single land grant in Wakefield Parish along the western side of Route 560. The communities of Brookville and Lakeville are both part of the LSD.

Lakeville was established in 1985 to add street lighting, recreational facilities, and first aid and ambulance services.

In 2020, the LSD assesses for street lighting and community & recreation services. The taxing authority was 230.00 Lakeville.

LSDAC: Yes. Chair Joseph Weston sat on the WVRSC board of directors from at least 2015 until June 2018, first as an alternate and then as a full member from August 2016. Chair Carl Rattray replaced Weston on the WVRSC board and has served since July 2018.

== Communities ==
Communities at least partly within the parish; bold indicates an incorporated municipality

- Avondale
- Avondale Road
- Beckim Settlement
- Bloomfield
- Bradley Corner
- Brookville
- Carvell
- **Centreville**
- Charleston
- Deerville
- Digby Corner
- Good Corner
- Hunters Corner
- Lakeville
- Long Settlement
- Lower Bloomfield
- McKeaghan
- Weston
- Williamstown
- Wilmot

== Bodies of water ==
Bodies of water (Note: Not including brooks, ponds or coves.) at least partly in the parish:

- North Branch Meduxnekeag River
- Dead Stream
- Little Presque Isle Stream
- Gowan Lake
- Ketch Lake
- Marvin Lake
- McWaid Lake
- Waters Lake
- Williamstown Lake

== Other notable places ==
Parks, historic sites, and other noteworthy places at least partly in the parish.

- Clarke Brook Protected Natural Area
- Lakeville Protected Natural Area
- Two Mile Brook Fen Protected Natural Area
- Williamstown Lake Protected Natural Area

== Demographics ==
Parish population total does not include portion within Centreville

=== Population ===
**Population trend**

Census	Population	Change (%)
2016	1,022	▼5.8%
2011	1,085	▼5.1%
2006	1,143	▼6.2%
2001	1,219	▲2.2%
1996	1,193	▲4.5%
1991	1,142	N/A

=== Language ===
**Mother tongue (2016)**

Language	Population	Pct (%)
English only	980	96.1%
Other languages	25	2.4%
French only	15	1.5%
Both English and French	0	0.00%

== See also ==
- List of parishes in New Brunswick
