= Simonds Parish =

Simonds Parish may refer to:

- Simonds Parish, Carleton County, New Brunswick, Canada
- Simonds Parish, Saint John County, New Brunswick, Canada
