= Knowlesville, New Brunswick =

Community in New Brunswick, Canada

Coordinates: 46°27′49″N 67°22′32″W

Knowlesville is a small community in Carleton County in the Canadian province of New Brunswick. Knowlesville is in Aberdeen Parish, with a population in the 2011 Census of 981. It is located approximately 20 km east of Florenceville-Bristol, New Brunswick, along the Knowlesville Road.

Mount Frederick Clarke in Knowlesville has an elevation of 531 meters or 1742 feet.

== History ==
Knowlesville is close to Skedaddle Ridge, where a number of Skedaddlers, draft evaders from the American Civil War lived during the 1860s.

It was named for Rev. Charles Knowles, a Free Will Baptist minister from Yarmouth, Nova Scotia, who persuaded some local fishermen to take up farming in the area in 1861.

== Notable people ==
- Earle Avery - Canadian & U.S. Hall of Fame harness racing driver/trainer.

== See also ==
- List of communities in New Brunswick

== Readings ==
- Corey, Judson M. The Story of Knowlesville: The Community and Its People., J. M. Corey, 1985. ISBN 0969217609
- Corey, Judson M. Knowlesville II: the Corey story. Saint John: Inspiration Graphics, 2003.
- The South Knowlesville Community Land Trust
