= Bedell Settlement, New Brunswick =

Settlement in New Brunswick, Canada

Coordinates: 46°07′54″N 67°39′15″W

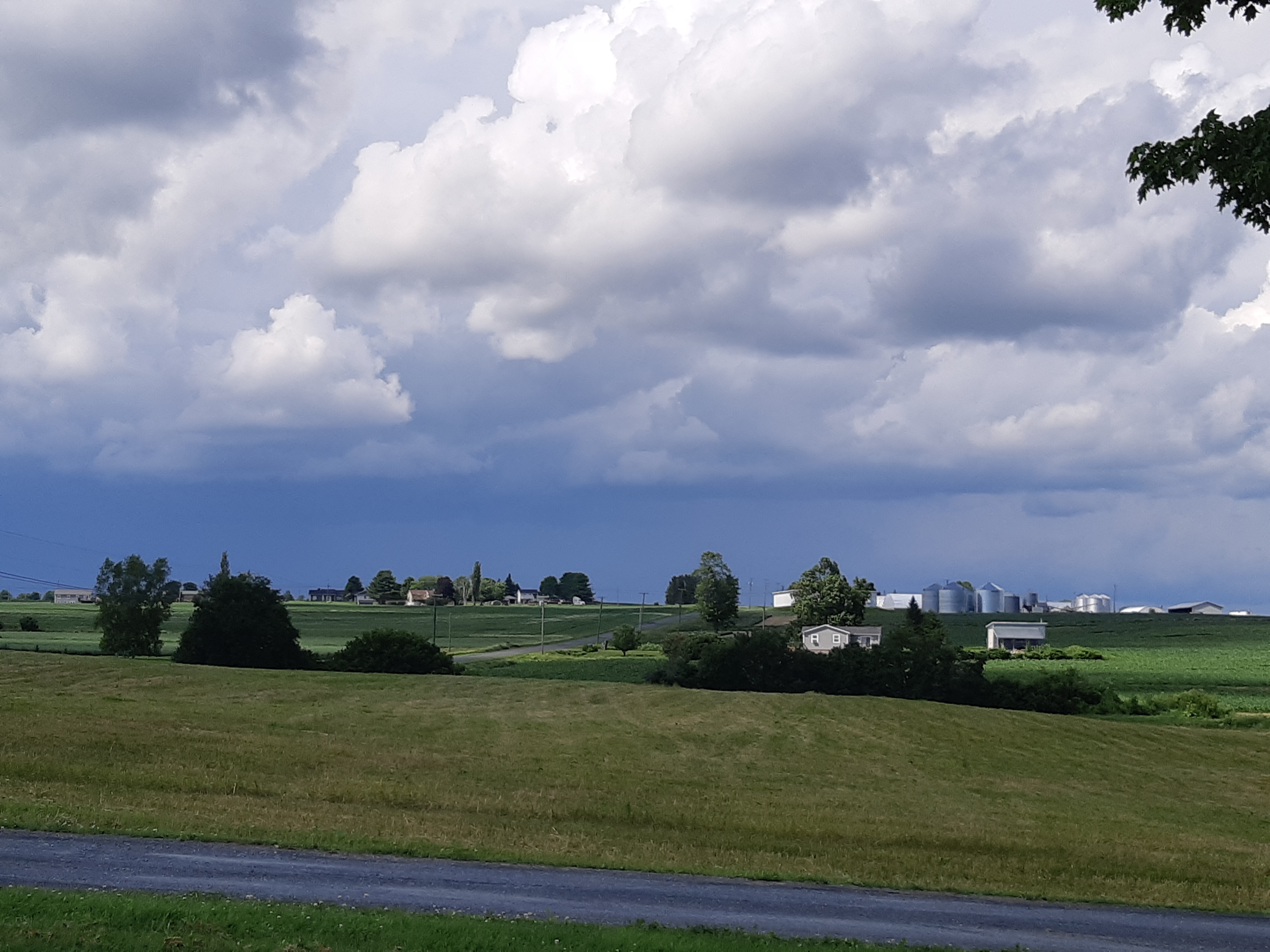

Bedell Settlement, often shortened to Bedell, is a settlement in Carleton County, New Brunswick.

== Education ==
Bedell has one school, Meduxnekeag Consolidlated School (MCS) that serves grades K-8.

== History ==
Located 4.28 km ESE of Richmond Corner: Woodstock Parish, Carleton County: founded by Joseph Bedell, son of the Loyalist settler John Bedell (1755-1838): in 1866 Bedell Settlement was a farming community with approximately 7 resident families, including the families of Edwin Bedell and Walter Bedell: PO 1904–1913.

== Notable people ==
- Gage Montgomery - PC Party of Canada

== See also ==
- List of communities in New Brunswick
