= Debec, New Brunswick =

Town in Canada

Coordinates: 46.067°N 67.683°W

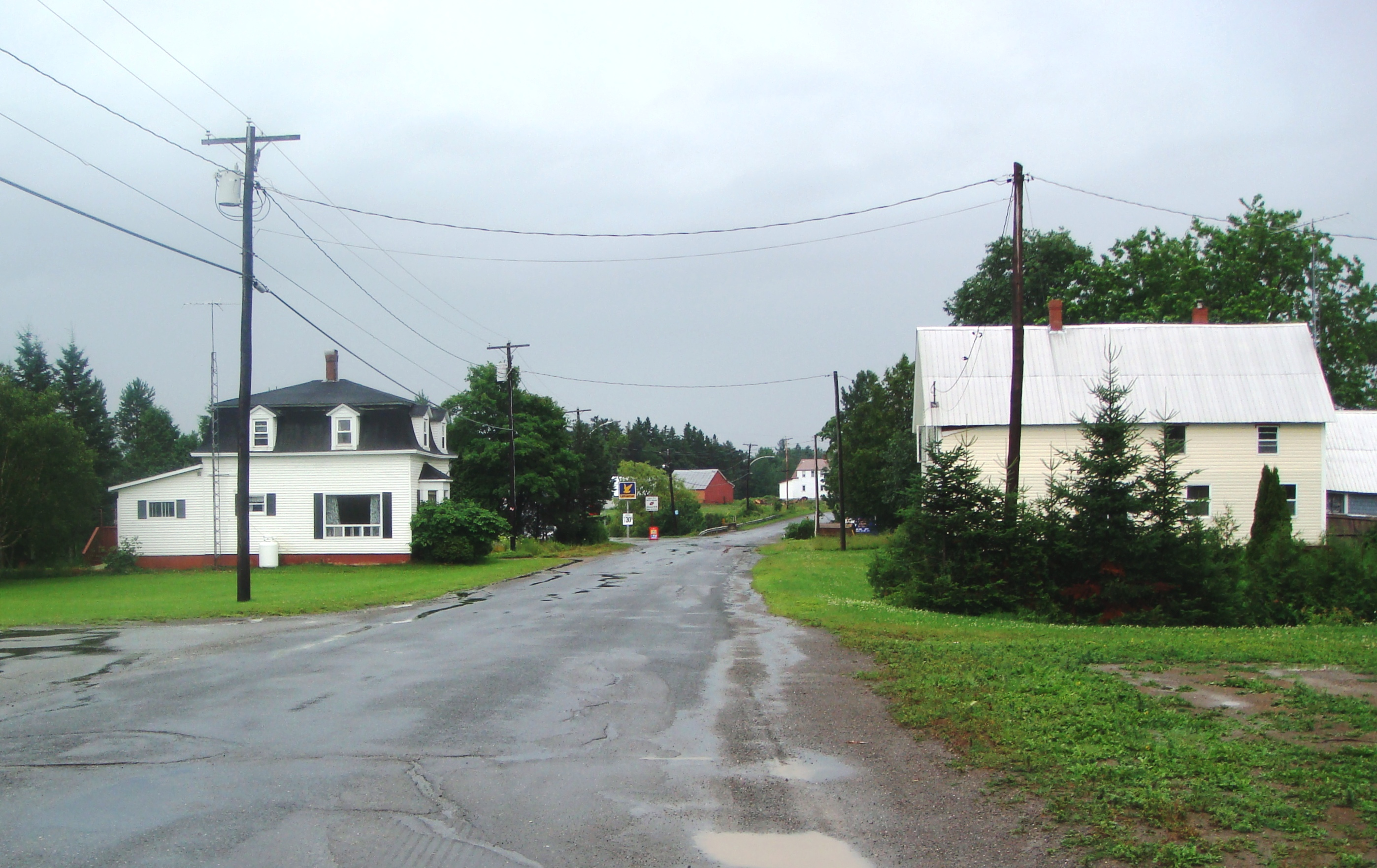
Debec

Location of Debec in New Brunswick

Debec is a community in Carleton County in the Canadian province of New Brunswick.

An outdoor community park known locally as "The Field of Dreams" was established in the early 2000s, giving local residents a place to ice skate, play volleyball and baseball. It hosts the annual summer celebration each August, "Debec Days," which is facilitated by the Debec Recreation Council.

== History ==
Debec was named after George De Beck who settled there in 1835. Before that it was known as Blairs Mills after Andrew Blair, surveyor and father of premier Andrew George Blair. It is southwest of Woodstock, and close to the Maine border. It developed as a railway junction. Canadian Pacific Railway trains ran along the north-south tracks from Woodstock to McAdam, and Debec was a junction for trains running from Woodstock to Houlton, Maine. The border between Maine and New Brunswick was fluid in the late 19th and early 20th century - at least for people. Men followed the work to Maine, particularly for forestry and railroading. Many young men from Debec and the surrounding areas followed the jobs of the CPR to Brownville Junction, Maine, a midpoint in the CPR route across Maine to Quebec and Montreal.

Debec was a prosperous community from the late 1870s through to the end of World War I. Farming declined after that period as the mechanization of farm operations gradually diminished the viability of farming - the cause - too high a rock content in the soil. Where the horse could prosper, the tractor of that day could not. However more recently farming has made a comeback in some parts of the community with several large operations now growing crops.

Debec once had a branch of the Bank of Nova Scotia. When it opened in November 1919, the village had 6 stores, a grist mill, several potato shipping operations and was one of the busiest points for freight on the CPR rail lines in Carleton County. The high hopes for success at Debec however were never fully realized. By 1922 the Manager was reporting that "Low prices of farm produce and losses last season in potatoes are the chief causes of the large reduction in current account and savings balances. Farmers were obliged to borrow much more heavily this year than last." Another factor contributing to the poor showing of the branch was the competition from banks in Houlton, where interest rates of 4% were offered on deposits (compared with 3% offered by The Bank of Nova Scotia). Farmers of the area were depositing their money in Houlton banks and doing all their regular shopping there as well." The bank branch was closed in May 1925 and accounts were transferred to the Woodstock Branch. The great depression and tougher times still were just ahead.

== Demographics ==
In the 2021 Census of Population conducted by Statistics Canada, Debec had a population of 104 living in 42 of its 50 total private dwellings, a change of 6.1% from its 2016 population of 98. With a land area of 0.96 km^{2} (0.37 sq mi), it had a population density of 108.3/km^{2} (280.6/sq mi) in 2021.

== Education ==
Debec is currently home to a Fire Station and Post Office, the Debec General Store and the Carleton County Animal Shelter. Debec has two community halls, one at Trinity United Church, and the other at the Debec Women's Institute Hall. The W.I. Hall was once the village's school house. Generations of children attended there before it closed for good in the 1960s.

When the school was opened in 1952 it was named the Debec Consolidated High School. It served a number of communities in South Richmond as a grade 6-12 school for 15 years - 1952 to 1967. The youth of that era are now retired or about to and are planning a major celebration of their school, their community and their heritage in 2012. The Debec Area Home Coming will be held from August 3–5, 2012 and promises to be a grand event in the long history of the area.

Debec also has a Community Access Centre where the public can take advantage of low-cost internet access and educational upgrades, Debec is an incorporated Local Service District.

== Religion ==
The former St. Agnes' Catholic church was closed in the 1980s and has since been torn down. The village once had a large two story hall in the centre of the community but it too was torn down in the early 1970s. Trinity United Church (United Church of Canada) still offers services, and its meeting hall is used for a variety of community events.

== See also ==
- List of communities in New Brunswick
