= Peel, New Brunswick =

Coordinates: 46°21′N 67°33′W

Peel is a Canadian rural community in Carleton County, New Brunswick. It is located on the east side of the Saint John River, 5.71 km NNW of Hartland, on the road to Stickney. It is part of Peel Parish.

== History ==
A post office was first established here in 1862. It was removed in 1969. In 1866 Peel was a farming and lumbering settlement with approximately 47 resident families. In 1904 Peel was a flag station on the Canadian Pacific Railway, with a population of 150.

By 1961 its population had declined to 132.

== Notable people ==
Hugh John Flemming (1899–1982), was born here.

== See also ==
- List of communities in New Brunswick
