= Gordonsville, New Brunswick =

Gordonsville
- Unincorporated community
- Location of Gordonsville in New Brunswick
- Coordinates: 46.482606°N 67.516802°W
- Country: Canada
- Province: New Brunswick
- County: Carleton County
- Established: 1881
- Time zone: UTC-4 (AST)
  - Summer (DST): UTC-3 (ADT)
- Postal code: E7L

Gordonsville is an unincorporated community near the town of Florenceville-Bristol in the west of the Canadian province of New Brunswick.

== Etymology ==
Gordonsville may have been named for Charles Gordon Glass, who founded both this settlement and nearby Glassville (which is also named for him) in 1881.
