= Iron Ore Hill, New Brunswick =

Iron Ore Hill
- Location within New Brunswick

Highest point
- Elevation: 216 feet (66 m)
- Coordinates: 46°14′N 67°37′W

Geography
- Location: Carleton County, New Brunswick, Canada
- Parent range: Smyrna Mills Formation
- Topo map: USGS Mount Shasta

Geology
- Mountain type: Shield

Climbing
- First ascent: 1836
- Easiest route: Iron Ore Hill Road

Iron Ore Hill is a Canadian rural community in Carleton County, New Brunswick, 5 kilometers northwest of Woodstock.

== History ==
The community is located on the slopes of Iron Ore Hill, named from deposits of iron ore and manganese located in the area. The deposit was discovered in 1836. Iron was mined near here from 1848 to 1884. A reported 70,000 tons iron ore was smelted during that time. The iron produced was transported to the Woodstock Iron Works to be smelted.

== See also ==
- List of communities in New Brunswick
