= Royalton, New Brunswick =

Coordinates: 46.484°N 67.771°W

Royalton is a small community located 3.16 km southwest of Knoxford, Carleton County, New Brunswick, Canada. Royalton used to be a farming community with a population of 150 and one church.

Today Royalton remains a farming community, made up mainly of larger potato farms along with a large Christmas tree farm and maple sugar bush and some cattle farming.

The Royalton Community Church, formerly the Royalton Wesleyan Church, is still in operation after more than 100 years at the corner of Royalton Road and Crawford Road.

Crawford Road, a dirt road that links Royalton to Knoxford, was first given the name Piper Road when the 911 system was introduced in New Brunswick. A complaint was made pointing out that the only tie the Piper family had to the road was a pasture filled with cows on the Knoxford side, while the Crawford family had a home and farm on the Royalton side. The name was changed. Around the same time, that area of Royalton was named Lower Royalton, but community members argued that it had always simply been known as Royalton, and so the name of the community was officially changed to Royalton.
