= Peel Parish =

Peel
- Parish
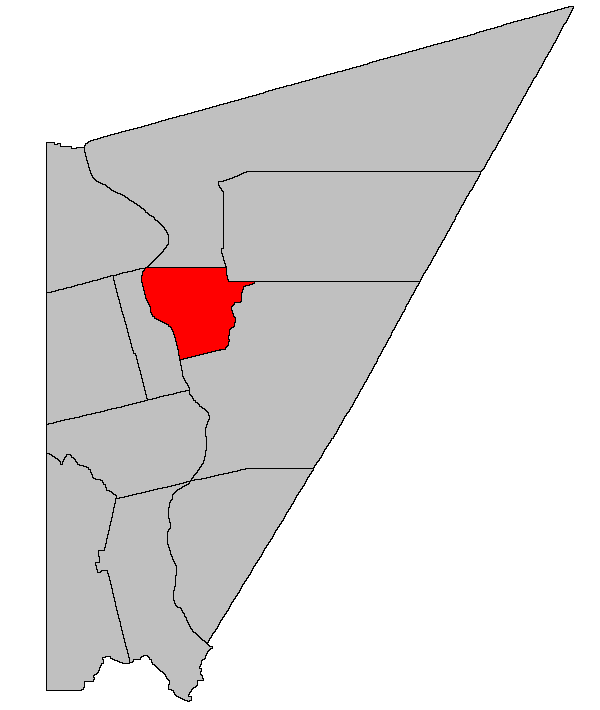
- Location within Carleton County, New Brunswick
- Coordinates: 46.355°N 67.555°W
- Country: Canada
- Province: New Brunswick
- County: Carleton
- Erected: 1859

Area
  - Land: 112.74 km^{2} (43.53 sq mi)

Population (2021)
  - Total: 1,198
  - Density: 10.6/km^{2} (27/sq mi)
  - Change 2016-2021: ▲0.2%
  - Dwellings: 508
- Time zone: UTC-4 (AST)
  - Summer (DST): UTC-3 (ADT)
- Figures do not include portion within the town of Florenceville-Bristol

Peel is a geographic parish in Carleton County, New Brunswick, Canada, situated on the eastern bank of the Saint John River.

Prior to the 2023 governance reform, for governance purposes it was comprised one local service district and part of one town, both of which were members of the Western Valley Regional Service Commission (WVRSC).

The Census subdivision of Peel Parish includes all of the geographic parish except the town of Florenceville-Bristol.

== Origin of name ==
The parish may have been named after one of two brothers: Jonathan Peel, Secretary of State for War when the parish was created, or Robert Peel, who was twice Prime Minister of the United Kingdom.

== History ==
Peel was erected in 1859 from northwestern Brighton Parish. It included the southwestern corner of Aberdeen Parish until 1863.

== Boundaries ==
Peel Parish is bounded:

- on the west by the Saint John River;
- on the north by a line running due east from opposite the mouth of Whitemarsh Brook to a reserved road along the western line of grants on the Ketchum Ridge Road, then south along that tier of grants to its end, then due east to the Cold Stream near the junction of Black Brook and East Coldstream roads;
- on the east by the Cold Stream;
- and on the south by the prolongation of the north line of a land grant north of Hales Brook to the Cold Stream.

== Municipality ==
The town of Florenceville-Bristol comprises the northwestern corner of the parish.

== Local service district ==
The local service district of the parish of Peel comprised all of the parish outside Florenceville-Bristol.

The LSD was established in 1966 to assess for fire service following the abolition of county government under the new Municipalities Act. Community services were added in 1967.

In 2020, the LSD assesses for community and recreation services in addition to the basic LSD services of fire protection, police services, land use planning, emergency measures, and dog control. The taxing authority was 211.00 Peel.

LSD advisory committee: Yes. Chair Jill Hunter was an alternate on the WVRSC board in 2015 and 2016. Chair Joseph Trevors has sat on the board since 2017.

== Communities ==
Communities at least partly within the parish; bold indicates an incorporated municipality; italics indicate a name no longer in official use

- East Coldstream
- **Florenceville-Bristol**
- Jericho
- Lansdowne
- Mount Pleasant
- Oakland
- Peel
- Riverbank
- South Gordonsville
- Stickney
- Upper Peel

== Bodies of water ==
Bodies of water (Note: Not including brooks, ponds or coves.) at least partly in the parish:

- Saint John River
- Cold Stream

== Islands ==
Islands at least partly in the parish:

- Presque Isle Island

== Other notable places ==
Parks, historic sites, and other noteworthy places at least partly in the parish.

- Oakland Mountain Protected Natural Area
- Stickney Protected Natural Area

== Demographics ==
Parish population total does not include portion within Florenceville-Bristol

=== Population ===
**Population trend**

| Census | Population | Change (%) |
|---|---|---|
| 2016 | 1,196 | ▼2.2% |
| 2011 | 1,223 | ▼2.7% |
| 2006 | 1,257 | ▼5.4% |
| 2001 | 1,329 | ▼3.3% |
| 1996Adj | 1,375 | ▲6.9% |
| 1996 | 1,286 | ▲1.2% |
| 1991 | 1,271 | N/A |

=== Language ===
**Mother tongue (2016)**

| Language | Population | Pct (%) |
|---|---|---|
| English only | 1,135 | 95.4% |
| French only | 15 | 1.3% |
| Other languages | 40 | 3.4% |
| Both English and French | 0 | 0% |

== See also ==
- List of parishes in New Brunswick
