= Knoxford, New Brunswick =

Coordinates: 46°30′N 67°44′W

Knoxford is a Canadian rural community in Carleton County, New Brunswick. There are two parts to Knoxford: Upper Knoxford (agricultural) and Lower Knoxford (residential). It is located 3.16 km NE of Royalton. There are two churches located in Knoxford, one in Lower Knoxford and one in Upper Knoxford. Lower Knoxford is home to the Praying Band Church. While the United Baptist Church is located in Upper Knoxford.

There is also a hunting lodge situated in Upper Knoxford that provides access to over 3,000 acres of private land, which facilitates a wide range of activities from guided hunting adventures to weekend getaways. There is also a private lake located at the lodge allowing for private fishing to lodge guests.

The community was settled by its namesake, George Knox, and was to be originally named Knoxville.

== Education ==
No schools are located in the community, thus students must travel to Carleton North High School in Bristol and Centreville Community School in Centreville.

== History ==
In 1866 Knoxford was a farming settlement with approximately 18 resident families, including the family of George Knox. In 1898 Knoxford had 1 post office, 2 churches and a population of 200. A post office branch was established there in 1866, and was removed in 1915.

== See also ==
- List of communities in New Brunswick
