= Ashland, New Brunswick =

Coordinates: 46.7915°N 67.486778°W

Location of Ashland in New Brunswick

Ashland is a Canadian community in Carleton County, New Brunswick.

Ashland is located 3.71 km south of Coldstream.

== History ==
A post office branch was established there in 1876 and was removed in 1914. In 1898, Ashland was a settlement with 1 post office and a population of 90.

== See also ==
- List of communities in New Brunswick
