= River de Chute =

River in the United States and Canada

River De Chute

Location
- Countries: United States, Canada

Physical characteristics
- Source
  - location: Maine
- Mouth
  - location: Saint John River
  - coordinates: 46°35′44″N 67°43′35″W
  - elevation: 300 feet (91 m)
- Length: about 8 miles (13 km)

Basin features
- Progression: St. John — Bay of Fundy

The River de Chute is a river in Maine and New Brunswick. From the outflow of Lindsay Lake (46°40′22″N 67°47′40″W) in Easton, Maine, the river runs about 5 miles (8 km) south, about half a mile west of the Canada–United States border. The river turns east and crosses into Canada at 46°36′04″N 67°47′18″W. It runs about 3 miles (5 km) to its confluence with the Saint John River. This section of the river forms the border between Carleton County, New Brunswick and Victoria County, New Brunswick.

== See also ==
- List of rivers of Maine
- List of bodies of water of New Brunswick
