= Aberdeen Parish, New Brunswick =

Aberdeen
- Parish
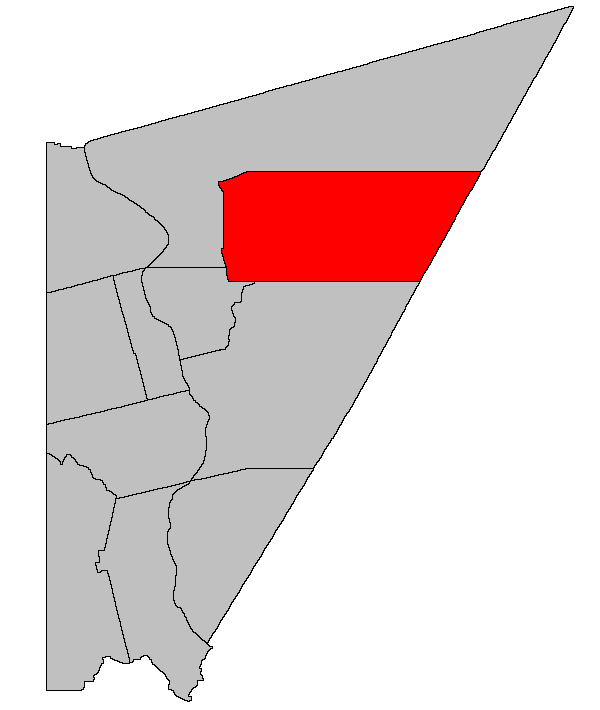
- Location within Carleton County, New Brunswick
- Coordinates: 46.53°N 67.34°W
- Country: Canada
- Province: New Brunswick
- County: Carleton
- Erected: 1863

Area
  - Land: 444.88 km^{2} (171.77 sq mi)

Population (2021)
  - Total: 812
  - Density: 1.8/km^{2} (4.7/sq mi)
  - Change 2016-2021: ▲4.0%
  - Dwellings: 468
- Time zone: UTC-4 (AST)
  - Summer (DST): UTC-3 (ADT)

Aberdeen is a geographic parish in Carleton County, New Brunswick, Canada, located in the interior east of the Saint John River.

Prior to the 2023 governance reform, for governance purposes it was comprised two local service districts (LSD), both of which were members of the Western Valley Regional Service Commission (WVRSC).

The Census subdivision of Aberdeen Parish shares the geographic parish's borders. Revised census figures based on the 2023 local governance reforms have not been released.

== Origin of name ==
Aberdeen, Scotland was the source of many settlers of Glassville Settlement. Also possible is that the parish was named in honour of either the Earl of Aberdeen, a former Prime Minister of the United Kingdom who died shortly before Glassville was settled, or his youngest son Arthur Hamilton-Gordon, who was Lieutenant Governor of New Brunswick when the parish was erected.

== History ==
Aberdeen was erected in 1863 from Brighton, Kent, and Peel Parishes. Most of the parish had formed the southeastern part of Kent, with Peel and Brighton providing a strip of territory along their northern edge.

== Boundaries ==
Aberdeen Parish is bounded:

- on the west by the western side of grants running along the Ketchum Ridge, West Glassville, Old West Glassville, Shikatehawk, and Denney Hill Roads;
- on the north by the north line of a grant on the Denney Hill Road prolonged to the York County line;
- on the east by the York County line;
- on the south by the southern line of a grant southwest of the intersection of the Black Brook and Ketchum Ridge roads, prolonged to the York County line.

=== Evolution of boundaries ===
The original boundaries of Aberdeen have changed little, unusual among Carleton County's parishes.

In 1896 the northwestern corner and northern boundary were changed to better match grant lines, taking a long narrow triangle of territory from Kent Parish while losing a few acres in the northwestern corner.

In 1956 the western boundary was altered slightly, transferring a Crown Reserved Road (Note: A Crown Reserved Road is a piece of land between tiers of land grants that the government held back when surveying blocks of grants. The fate of these roads ranges from modern paved roads to lines on maps of land that was never cleared.) to Kent Parish. This may have been an error, as the same Act corrected two wording errors that dated to 1896.

== Local service districts ==
Both LSDs assessed for the basic LSD services of fire protection, police services, land use planning, emergency measures, and dog control.

=== Aberdeen Parish ===
The local service district of the parish of Aberdeen originally comprised the entire parish.

It was established 23 November 1966 to assess for fire protection. Community services were added on 20 December 1967.

In 2020, Aberdeen additionally assessed for community & recreation services. The taxing authority is 207.00 Aberdeen.

LSD advisory committee: Yes. Chair Gailen Allan sat on the WVRSC board from at least 2015.

=== Glassville ===
Glassville comprised an irregular area around the junction of Route 107, Route 580, and the Centre Glassville Road.

The LSD was established on 18 December 1974 to add street lighting and first aid & ambulance services.

In 2020, Glassville additionally assesses for street lighting. The taxing authority is 223.00 Glassville.

LSD advisory committee: Yes. Chair Brent Pearson sat on the WVRSC board from at least 2015.

== Communities ==
Communities at least partly within the parish.

- Argyle
- Biggar Ridge
- Carlow
- Centre Glassville
- Divide
- East Glassville
- East Knowlesville
- Esdraelon
- Foreston
- Glassville
- Hayden Ridge
- Hemphill Corner
- Highlands
- Juniper
- Juniper Station
- Ketchum Ridge
- Knowlesville
- MacIntosh Mill
- North Ridge
- South Ridge
- West Glassville

== Bodies of water ==
Bodies of water (Note: Not including brooks, ponds or coves.) at least partly within the parish.

- Southwest Miramichi River
- Nashwaak River
- Cold Stream
- Shikatehawk Stream
- Nashwaak Lake

== Other notable places ==
Parks, historic sites, and other noteworthy places at least partly within the parish.

- Golden Ridge Protected Natural Area
- Juniper Airport
- Mount Frederick Clarke
- Shikatehawk Stream Protected Natural Area
- Welch Brook Protected Natural Area

== Demographics ==
=== Population ===
Population trend

Census	Population	Change (%)
2016	781	▼20.4%
2011	981	▲2.3%
2006	959	▼10.0%
2001	1,065	▼6.7%
1996	1,141	▼2.1%
1991	1,165	N/A
1951	1,585	N/A

=== Language ===
Mother tongue (2016)

Language	Population (Note: Based on rounded population of 780.)	Pct (%)
English only	740	94.87%
French only	40	5.13%
Other languages	0	0.00%
Both English and French	0	0.00%

== See also ==
- List of parishes in New Brunswick
