= Armond, New Brunswick =

Coordinates: 46.421056°N 67.376083°W

Location of Armond in New Brunswick

Armond is a Canadian community in Carleton County, New Brunswick.

== See also ==
- List of communities in New Brunswick
