= Porten Settlement, New Brunswick =

Community in New Brunswick, Canada

Coordinates: 45.955446°N 67.53253°W

Porten Settlement is a community in the Canadian province of New Brunswick.

== See also ==
- List of communities in New Brunswick
