= Avondale, New Brunswick =

Coordinates: 46.316694°N 67.645194°W

Location of Avondale in New Brunswick

Avondale is a community in the Canadian province of New Brunswick. With a population of about 100, is located off the Trans-Canada Highway (N.B. Route 2) about 15 km from Hartland, famous for its very long covered bridge. Avondale is about an hour's drive west from Fredericton N.B. and 30 minutes from the start of Interstate 95 in Houlton, Maine.

== Notable people ==
Samuel Gilbert Barter (1871-1963) was a lifelong resident of Avondale (initially called Barter Settlement) and, in 1919, wrote about its progress from the 1840s to the early part of the 20th century. A condensed version of this history, blogged as A turn-of-the-last-century boomtown, links to the original work which includes numerous other records and photographs.

== See also ==
- List of communities in New Brunswick
