= Speerville, New Brunswick =

Coordinates: 46.047°N 67.629°W

Location of Speerville in New Brunswick

Speerville is a rural community in New Brunswick, Canada. It is home to the Speerville Flour Mill, which opened in 1982.

== History ==
Speerville was settled in 1820 by William, John, and James Speer. In 1878, a post office opened with Oliver Speer as the first postmaster. By 1898, Speerville had a population of 100.

== See also ==
- List of communities in New Brunswick
