= Wicklow, New Brunswick =

Settlement in New Brunswick, Canada

Wicklow
- Settlement
- Interactive map of Wicklow
- Coordinates: 46°29′44″N 67°35′28″W
- Country: Canada
- Province: New Brunswick
- County: Carleton County
- Parish: Wicklow Parish
- Established: 19th century
- Time zone: UTC−4 (Atlantic Standard Time)
  - Summer (DST): UTC−3 (Atlantic Daylight Time)
- Postal code(s): E7K
- Area code: 506

Wicklow is a settlement in New Brunswick. It is named for town of Wicklow in Ireland.

== See also ==
- List of communities in New Brunswick
