= Woodstock Parish, New Brunswick =

Woodstock
- Parish
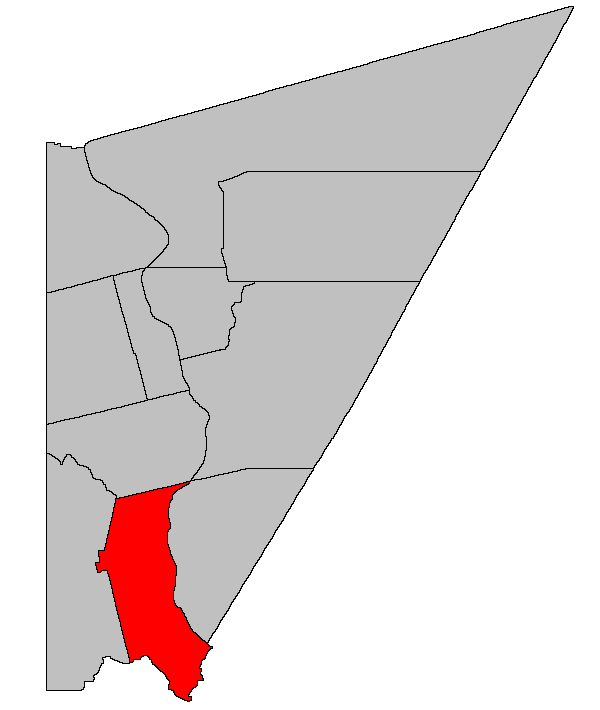
- Location within Carleton County, New Brunswick
- Coordinates: 46.06°N 67.6°W
- Country: Canada
- Province: New Brunswick
- County: Carleton
- Erected: 1786

Area
  - Land: 194.83 km^{2} (75.22 sq mi)

Population (2021)
  - Total: 2,219
  - Density: 11.4/km^{2} (30/sq mi)
  - Change 2016-2021: ▲1.9%
  - Dwellings: 936
- Time zone: UTC-4 (AST)
  - Summer (DST): UTC-3 (ADT)
- Figures do not include portions within the town of Woodstock, the Woodstock 23 Indian reserve, and the village of Meductic; Population change reflects revised 2016 figure

Woodstock is a geographic parish in Carleton County, New Brunswick, Canada, surrounding the town of the same name on its landward side.

Prior to the 2023 governance reform, for governance purposes it was comprised one town, one Indian reserve, part of one village, and parts of three local service districts, all of which except the Indian reserve were members of the Western Valley Regional Service Commission (WVRSC).

The Census subdivision of the same name includes all of the parish except the municipalities and Indian reserve.

== Origin of name ==
The parish was named in honour of Viscount Woodstock, a junior title of the Duke of Portland, Prime Minister of Great Britain when the Loyalists arrived in New Brunswick.

== History ==
Woodstock was erected in 1786 as one York County's original parishes. The parish included most of Richmond Parish and parts of Canterbury, Dumfries, McAdam, and North Lake Parishes.

== Boundaries ==
Woodstock Parish is bounded:

- on the east by the Saint John River;
- on the north by the northern line of a grant nearly opposite the mouth of Shaws Creek and its prolongation westerly;
- on the west by the rear or western line of the second tier of lots west of the Saint John River, prolonged to the Eel River;
- and on the south and southeast by the Eel River.
- The parish also includes any islands in front of it in the Saint John River. The Territorial Division Act and cadastral map of the area are both moot on whether the northern boundary runs around or through Pine Island.

=== Evolution of boundaries ===
Woodstock's original boundaries extended along the southern bank of the Saint John River from just west of Pokiok to its modern northern line, which extended inland through what's now Richmond Parish. The parish extended inland 12 miles (19 km) from the river along its length, crossing into what's now Maine.

In 1798 an international commission settled the boundary with the United States as far north as the boundary monument that marks the start of the southern boundary of Carleton County.

In 1832 Carleton County was separated from York, with the county line running through Woodstock Parish.

In 1833 the York County portion of Woodstock was included in the newly erected Dumfries Parish.

In 1834 the boundary with York County was altered to run along grant lines as it neared the Saint John River. This exchanged several small pieces of territory along the Eel River with Dumfries Parish in York County.

In 1838 all of Wakefield Parish south of the Meduxnekeag River along with any territory between Woodstock's western border and the boundary with the United States was annexed to Woodstock, putting part of Maine claimed by New Brunswick in the parish.

In 1842 the boundary with the United States was settled by the Webster–Ashburton Treaty.

In 1850 the original county line was restored, reversing the 1834 territorial exchange with Dumfries.

In 1853 all of Woodstock west of the first two tiers of grants was erected as Richmond Parish.

In 1854 the northern boundary was extended through the Meduxnekeag, transferring parts of two grants straddling the river to Wakefield Parish.

== Municipalities ==
The town of Woodstock sits at the mouth of the Meduxnekeag River, near the northeastern corner of the parish.

The village of Meductic sits at the mouth of the Eel River, straddling the York County line.

== Indian reserve ==
The Woodstock 23 Indian reserve stretches inland from the Saint John River, starting along Hodgdon Road and extending inland to King Road. The reserve belongs to the Woodstock First Nation, a Wəlastəkwewiyik band.

== Local service districts ==
All LSDs assessed for the basic LSD services of fire protection, police services, land use planning, emergency measures, and dog control.

=== Woodstock Parish ===
The local service district of the parish of Woodstock originally contained all of the parish except Woodstock, Meductic, and Debec. The Indian reserve is under federal administration but not explicitly excluded from the LSD. A small wetland area west of the mouth of Fish Creek in Richmond Parish was added to this LSD in 2014.

The LSD was established in 1966 to assess for fire protection following the elimination of county government under the new Municipalities Act. Community services were added in 1967 and recreational facilities in 1995.

In 2020, Woodstock Parish assesses for the additional service of community & recreational services. The taxing authority was 218.00 Woodstock.

LSD advisory committee? Yes. Chair Brian Hayden sat on the WVRSC board of directors from at least 2015.

=== Debec ===
Debec occupied an irregular area along the western side of the parish.

=== Benton ===
Benton straddled the county line at the bend of the Eel River, extending along the Benton, Lewin, and Caldwell Roads.

The LSD was established in 1967 to add community planning and street lights. Community services were added in 1968.

In 2020, Benton additionally assesses for street lighting and community & recreation services. The taxing authority was 219.00 Benton.

LSDAC? Unknown.

== Communities ==
Communities at least partly within the parish; bold indicates an incorporated municipality or Indian reserve

- Bedell Settlement
- Benton
- Bulls Creek
- Dibblee
- Hillman
- Mapledale
- **Meductic**
- Porten Settlement
- Riceville
- Speerville
- Springfield
- Teeds Mills
- Upper Woodstock
- Valley
- **Woodstock**
- **Woodstock 23**
  - Indian Village

== Bodies of water ==
Bodies of water (Note: Not including brooks, ponds or coves.) at least partly in the parish:

- Eel River
- Meduxnekeag River
- Saint John River
- Bulls Creek
- Fish Creek
- Lanes Creek
- Hays Lake

== Islands ==
Islands at least partly in the parish:

- Woodstock Island

== Other notable places ==
Parks, historic sites, and other noteworthy places at least partly in the parish.

- Kindness Club Wildlife Refuge
- Meduxnekeag Valley Protected Natural Area

== Demographics ==
Parish population total does not include town of Woodstock, Woodstock 23 Indian reserve, and portion within Meductic

=== Population ===
**Population trend**

Census	Population	Change (%)
2016	2,220	▲2.5%
2011	2,165	▲0.8%
2006	2,148	▲10.5%
2001Adj	1,944	▼1.7%
2001	1,977	▲2.5%
1996	1,929	▲10.4%
1991	1,748	N/A
1951	1,564	N/A

=== Language ===
**Mother tongue (2016)**

Language	Population	Pct (%)
English only	2,080	93.7%
French only	45	2.0%
Other languages	85	3.8%
Both English and French	10	0.5%

== See also ==
- List of parishes in New Brunswick
