= Bath, New Brunswick =

Bath
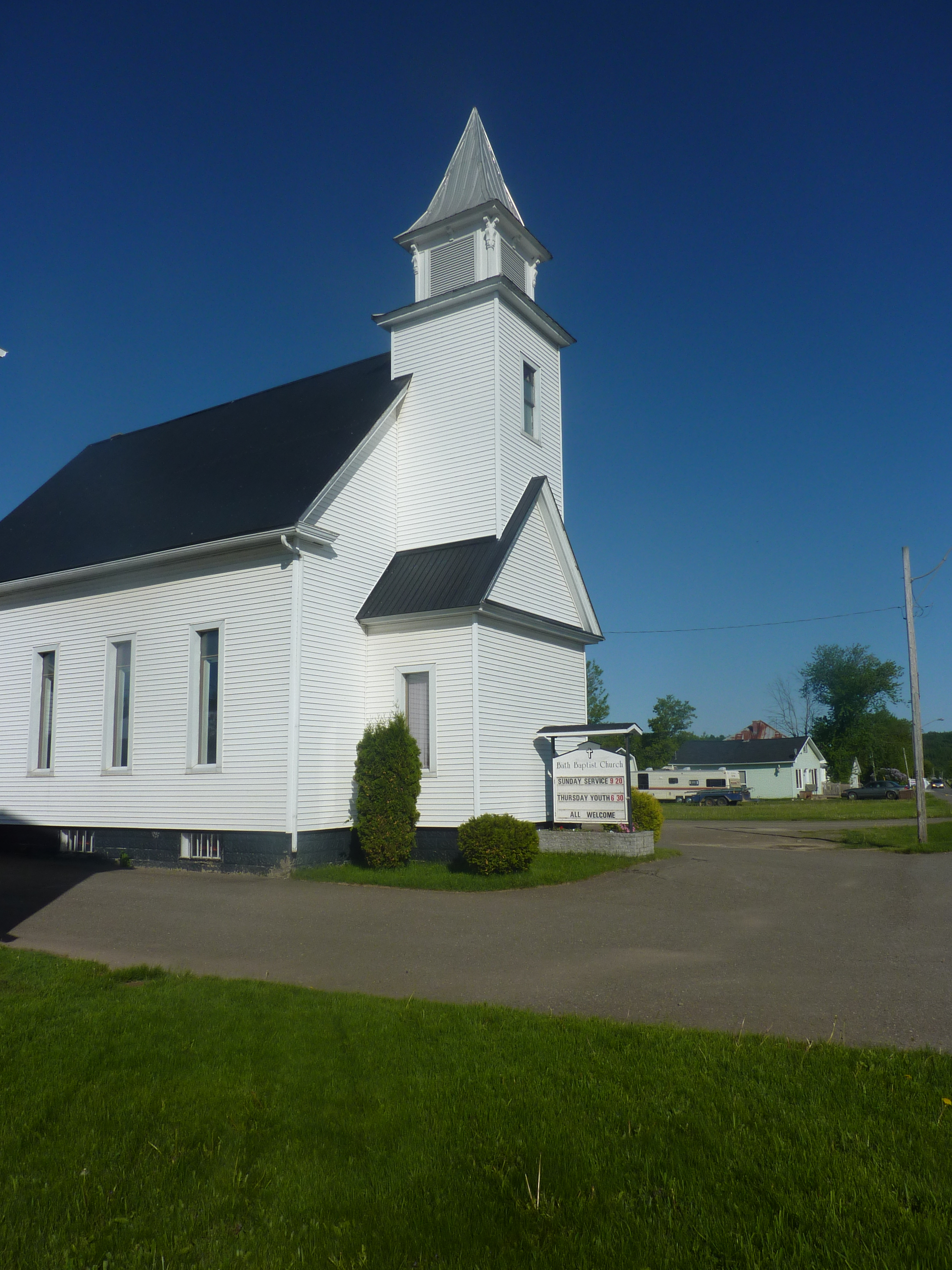
- Bath Baptist Church

- Location of Bath in New Brunswick
- Coordinates: 46°30′37″N 67°35′44″W
- Country: Canada
- Province: New Brunswick
- County: Carleton County
- Parishes: Kent Parish
- Town: Carleton North
- Incorporated: 9 November 1966
- Amalgamated: 1 January 2023

Government
  - MP: Richard Bragdon
  - MLA: Margaret Johnson

Area
  - Total: 2.00 km^{2} (0.77 sq mi)

Population (2021)
  - Total: 440
  - Density: 220/km^{2} (570/sq mi)
  - Change 2016–2021: ▼7.6%
- Time zone: UTC-4 (AST)
  - Summer (DST): UTC-3 (ADT)
- Canadian Postal code: E7J
- Area code: 506

Bath is a former village on the Saint John River in Carleton County, New Brunswick, Canada. It held village status prior to 2023 and is now part of the town of Carleton North. Bath was originally called Monquart, after the stream on its northern boarder, and to this day the residents of the area affectionately refer to themselves as "Monquarters".

Bath is famous for the annual "Bath Fall Fair" which took place every Labour Day with a parade and fair and to end the night fireworks.

== History ==
When Bath was first settled by Europeans, it was mostly soldiers after the War of 1812 who came to farm the area. At that time it was known as Monquart. It wasn't until 1868 that the community was renamed Bath, after the city in England. During that first century the residents of Bath were largely dependent on the St. John River as means of communication with other areas in the province, hydropower and transportation. When Canadian Pacific built the railway across the country, Bath, following a trend of remote village progressing towards connectivity, changed drastically. Residents of the village were now able to travel via rail instead of the river. This new access brought growth to Bath with a new retail stores, an axe factory, four hotels, a post office, and blacksmith shop opening as a result of the railway. By 1904, Bath had 1 post office, 8 stores, 2 hotels, 2 sawmills, 1 grist mill, 3 churches and a population of 350.

Bath was incorporated as a village in 1966.

On 1 January 2023, Bath became part of the new town of Carleton North. The community's name remains in official use.

== Demographics ==
In the 2021 Census of Population conducted by Statistics Canada, Bath had a population of 440 living in 192 of its 223 total private dwellings, a change of −7.6% from its 2016 population of 476. With a land area of 2 km^{2} (0.77 sq mi), it had a population density of 220.0/km^{2} (569.8/sq mi) in 2021. Revised census figures based on the 2023 local governance reforms have not been released.

== Economy ==
Similar to much of the central St. John River Valley, agriculture is the main industry in Bath. There are three farms within village limits and many farms in the surrounding settlements.

Bath has many small business, which is regarded as the backbone.

After the closure of the Northern Carleton Hospital in 2007, the economy in Bath took a downturn. The hospital closure had a domino effect of many small businesses either closing or moving to nearby Florencville-Bristol.

== Religion ==
Bath is within the region of New Brunswick referred to as the "Bible Belt," and it has a high number of churches in relation to the small population of the area. There are three churches with the town limits:

St. Joseph's Roman Catholic Church was closed in 2024.

United Pentecostal Church of Bath

United Baptist Parsonage

== Education ==
The Bath Community School currently enrolls 188 students from Kindergarten to grade 8. The school is in the Anglophone West School District. The Bath Elementary School was recently closed and students moved to the Bath Middle School directly beside. This "new" school was named Bath Community School and the current principal is Mitchell Hemphill. The Bath Community School is receiving $250,000 investment from the provincial government to aid in planning of upcoming renovations. The funds will be directed to the 2017-2018 capital budget.

== Politics ==
Bath sits in the federal riding of Tobique-Mactaquac which is represented by Conservative Member of Parliament Richard Bragdon. Bragdon has been representing this riding since 2019, when he won the seat from incumbent Liberal MP, T. J. Harvey.

Provincially, Bath is part of the Carleton-Victoria riding and has been represented by Progressive Conservative Member of the Legislative Assembly Margaret Johnson since 2020. Before Johnson, the riding was represented by Liberal MLA Andrew Harvey.

== Charitable organizations ==
The following charitable organizations are active in Bath:

- The Knights of Columbus is an international group of Catholic men taking charitable action. Charity is their main focus and the organization works hard to improve quality of life in Bath and surrounding areas. The Grand Knight of the Bath branch is Kevin Smith. The Knights host regular community fundraising breakfasts to support local residents. The Knights' Hall is the only wheelchair accessible community hall located in the District of Carleton North.
- The Lions Club is the largest service club organization. The club has multiple projects in the village all directed towards charitable actions. The President of the Bath Lions Club is Mike Nixon. The Bath Lions Club is known for its Medical Travel Fund which financially supports residents who need assistance going to doctors appointments outside the community. The Club has also been the main force behind many community projects, such as the Lions Villa, the Lions Park, and the annual Terry Fox Run.
- The River View Manor is a non-profit and registered charitable organization located in Bath, New Brunswick. The River View Manor opened in 1981 and is a beneficial contributor to the village of Bath economy. There are 39 residents in the manor and over 50 employees.
- The Bath Regional Fire Department is a 26 member volunteer fire department that serves Bath and surrounding areas. The fire chief is Stephen Armour.
- Bath Non Profit Housing was founded by Alice Lockhart. Their mission statement is to provide affordable housing and support services to residents in need, enhancing their quality of life and promoting community stability.
- Step Ahead Family Learning Centre is a non-profit child care centre located in Bath Community School. The Centre is currently building a new location next door, where the former Bath Middle School existed.

== Recreation ==
The Bath Swimming Pool is an outdoor swimming pool, typically operating from June - September. It is the largest swimming pool in the District of Carleton North.

There are two baseball diamonds located behind the Bath Fairgrounds.

There is one soccer field located behind the former Bath Middle School.

There are multiple parks throughout the former village.

There is one boat launch for the St. John River.

In the winter, the village staff maintain a skating rink.

== Events ==
River Run is a recently established tradition for the Village of Bath. Kayaks and canoes paddle down the St. John River each year on New Brunswick day from Bath to the next town, Florenceville-Bristol.

Bath Fall Fair has been a tradition in the Village of Bath since Labor Day in 1944. The fair takes place each year at the Bath Fair Grounds during Labour Day weekend. It begins with a parade throughout the town and continues with other events including:

Western New Brunswick International Balloon Festival begins in Bath on the Thursday before Labor Day and ends on the Monday. The festival occurs on the Bath Fair Grounds and is a family friendly event that gives locals an opportunity to experience hot air balloon rides and the beauty of witnessing a balloon festival.

Trevor-Goodine Professional Lumberjack Competition is held on Labour Day at the Bath Fair Grounds. It is a Maritime Lumberjack Association sanctioned event.

== Notable people ==
- Buzz Hargrove, former president of the Canadian Auto Workers
- Brent Hawkes, Canadian clergyman and gay rights activist
- Charlotte MacLeod, mystery fiction writer

== See also ==
- List of communities in New Brunswick
