= Stickney, New Brunswick =

Coordinates: 46°23′N 67°34′W

Location of Stickney in New Brunswick

Stickney is a community in the Canadian province of New Brunswick.

Stickney is located in northwest New Brunswick, on the north side of the Saint John River, about 1 1/2 hours from the provincial capital, Fredericton. Stickney is located about 8 minutes from Florenceville-Bristol.

Also located in Stickney is the Stickney & Area Recreation Center. The many volunteers at the Stickney & Area Recreation Center work very hard on behalf of their community. Each summer and winter they host annual festivals, the summer one known as Stickney Days.

Stickney also has an active Senior's club called "Stickney 50+ Club."

== History ==
Stickney once was a very busy community when it had two lumbermills. The planer mill was located near the shore of the Saint John River, which was famous for salmon fishing. The other saw mill was located up the hill. Both mills operated for many years, with closure in the late 1980s. The Burner, which is located near the Saint John River, is still standing. It is the only thing left to show that the lumbering industry was a major part of life in Stickney. The Burner was used for burning the excess bark and woodchips from the mills.

Stickney currently has a post office, which is located on Route 105. It was established in 1899. The first postmaster was A.L. Stickney.

== See also ==
- List of communities in New Brunswick
