= Centreville, New Brunswick =

Centreville
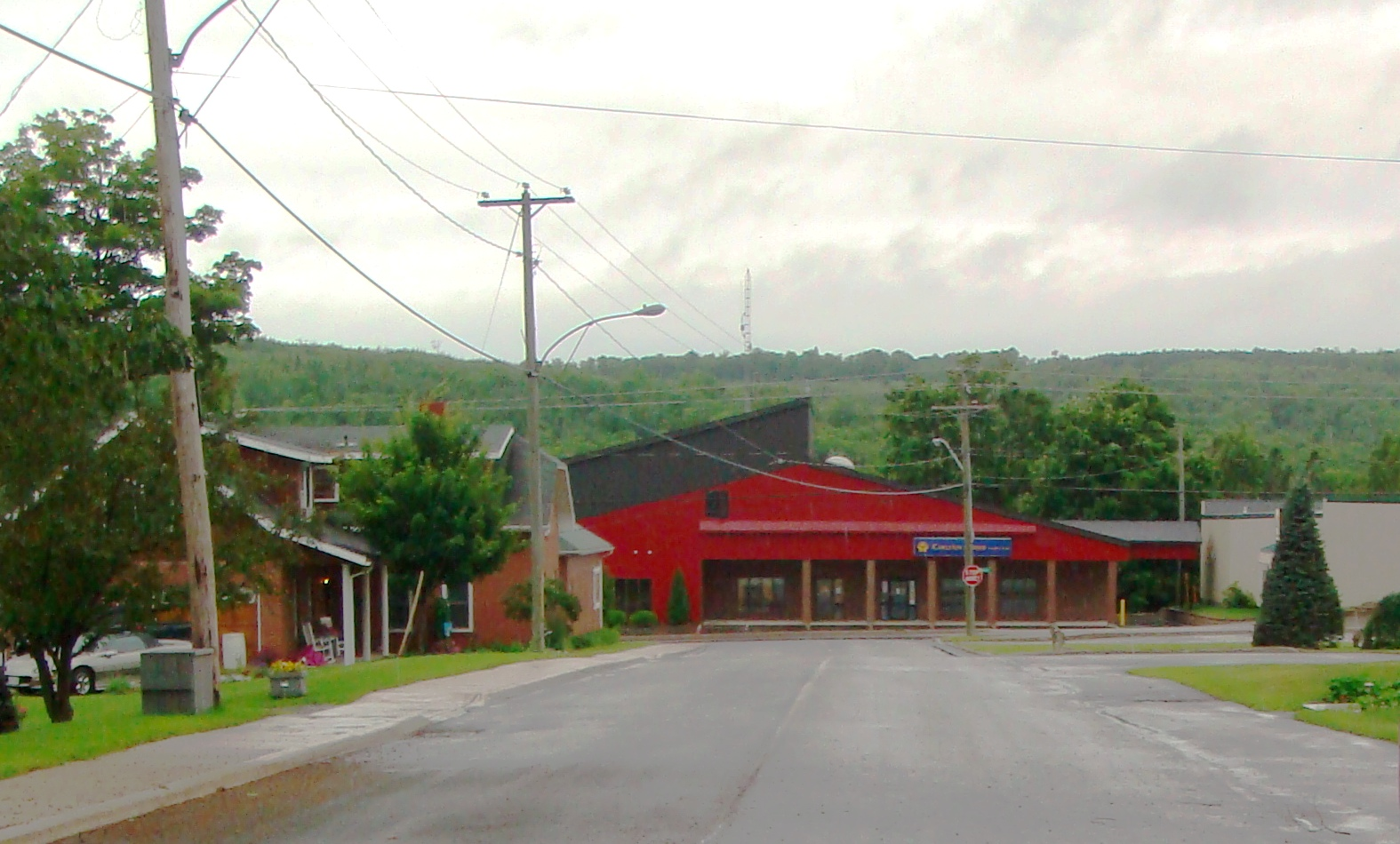
- Centreville Progressive Credit Union

- Location within New Brunswick
- Coordinates: 46°25′59″N 67°43′01″W
- Country: Canada
- Province: New Brunswick
- County: Carleton
- Parish: Wicklow
- Town: Carleton North
- Incorporated: 1966

Area
  - Land: 2.67 km^{2} (1.03 sq mi)

Population (2021)
  - Total: 508
  - Density: 190.4/km^{2} (493/sq mi)
  - Change 2016–21: ▼8.8%
- Time zone: UTC-4 (EST)
  - Summer (DST): UTC-3 (EDT)
- Website: Village of Centreville

Centreville is a former village in Carleton County, New Brunswick, Canada. It held village status prior to 2023 and is now part of the town of Carleton North.

Centreville is located only two miles from the border of Maine, US, at the Bridgewater crossing. Within Centreville there are three churches located in the town limits, the St. James Anglican Church, St. Pauls United Church and the Centreville Baptist Church. Centreville has a post office and is a service centre serving small communities such as Knoxford, Williamstown and Tracey Mills which are just outside the village. This is also a large farming community.

Centreville is also the host of annual tractor pulls. Alongside potatoes, it's probably what the community is best known for.

== History ==
Centreville was first founded by Thomas Johnston, who immigrated to New Brunswick from Ireland in 1821. In October 1896 construction of a railroad was started but was later stopped because of funding in December 1896. In October 1912, construction of the railroad was resumed and completed on October 1, 1914.

Centreville received its first telephone line 1894, which connected it with the town of Woodstock. It was not until 1902 that lines were added to the surrounding areas.

In February 1924, the installation of the electric line was completed and Centreville was able to use electricity.

Centreville's biggest pastime is their annual tractor pull. The event started with farmers coming together with their tractors and seeing who could tow the heaviest weight to gain bragging rights. Today it has developed into a weekend long event with modified tractors and trucks, instead of the traditional tractors.

On 1 January 2023, Centreville amalgamated with the town of Florenceville-Bristol, the village of Bath, and all or part of nine local service districts to form the new town of Carleton North. The community's name remains in official use.

== Education ==
There is a K-8 school, Centreville Community School, located in the centre of the village, housing approx. 250 students. This is part of ASD-W (Previously school district 14). Before the school became a community school there was an elementary school located on the same grounds as what was then the Centreville Middle School. Centreville Elementary School was closed in 2004 and the grades consolidated into one building: Centreville Community School. The old elementary school was torn down in 2011.

Centreville is one of several communities within Carleton County that historically participated in the annual Potato Break. Potato Break was a 2 & 1/2 week break from school around potato harvesting time (mid-September through early October) that allowed students the opportunity to help with the potato harvest, although working on the break was not mandatory. Schools that participated in Potato Break began classes in early August to compensate for the time taken off for Potato Break. This affected all feeder schools for Carleton North High School. Many of the other schools in the nearby areas did not participate in Potato Break because of one simple reason; less potatoes grown. These schools start school after Labor Day. The need for Potato Break was under review by the DEC and School District 14. For many years now, mechanization in the fields has vastly reduced the need for student labor.

Update: Potato Break was once again publicly reviewed in 2010/2011 and it was decided by the DEC, the Superintendent for School District 14 and the Minister of Education that a new system be put in place. Students who choose to work for a farmer and who are of minimum age to be working in the harvest are allowed time out of class over the harvest period; resources have been put in place by the school district to enable these students to keep up with their studies.

== Demographics ==
In the 2021 Census of Population conducted by Statistics Canada, Centreville had a population of 508 living in 254 of its 263 total private dwellings, a change of −8.8% from its 2016 population of 557. With a land area of 2.67 km^{2} (1.03 sq mi), it had a population density of 190.3/km^{2} (492.8/sq mi) in 2021.

== Economy ==
BWS Manufacturing is a family run company located in Centreville where they specialize in the production of trailers for the agriculture, construction, forestry and commercial industries. BWS Manufacturing has been a major employer and contributor to the local economy for the past 48 years in Centreville.

Metalfab Ltd. is another company that has called Centreville home since 1967, employing 40 people from the surrounding areas. Metalfab Ltd. is specialized in building custom fire trucks for their customers depending on their needs.

HSF Foods Ltd. is also located in Centreville and has been located in the village since 2006. HSF Foods Ltd. processes fresh potatoes into dehydrated potato flakes for industries around the world.

== See also ==
- List of communities in New Brunswick
