= Florenceville-Bristol =

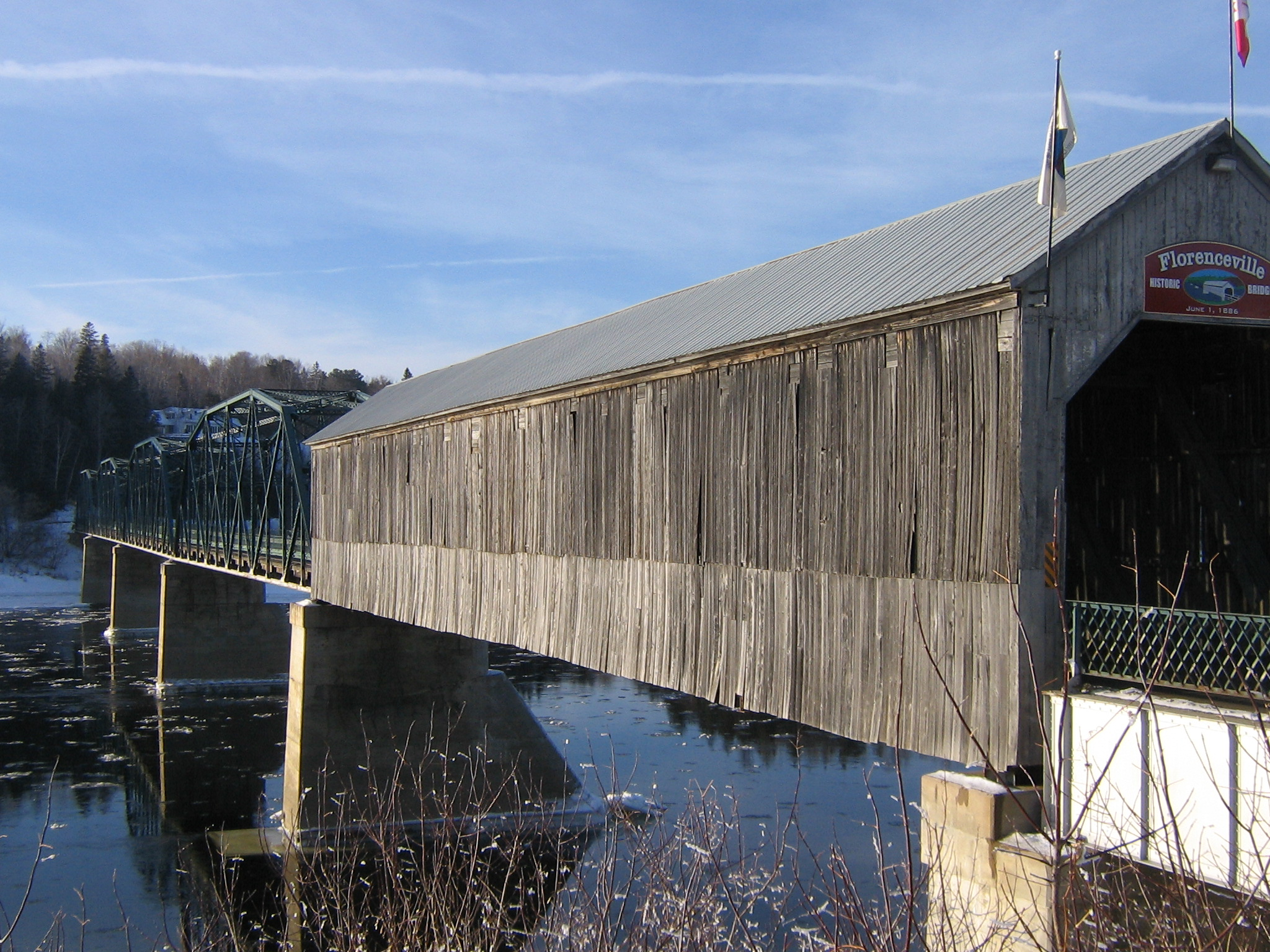
- The Florenceville Bridge across the Saint John River is partly covered.

- Seal
- Motto: French Fry Capital of the World
- Location of Florenceville in New Brunswick
- Coordinates: 46.443472°N 67.615222°W
- Country: Canada
- Province: New Brunswick
- County: Carleton County
- Town: Carleton North
- Amalgamated: July 1, 2008

Government
  - MP: Richard Bragdon
  - MLA: Margaret Johnson

Area
  - Total: 15.74 km^{2} (6.08 sq mi)
- Elevation: 150 m (490 ft)

Population (2021)
  - Total: 1,573
  - Density: 100/km^{2} (260/sq mi)
  - Change 2016-2021: ▼1.9%
- Time zone: UTC-4 (AST)
  - Summer (DST): UTC-3 (ADT)
- Canadian Postal code: E7L
- Area code: 506
- Telephone Exchange(s): 221, 245, 246, 276, 278, 391, 392, 595
- Website: http://www.florencevillebristol.ca/

Florenceville-Bristol is a former town in the northwestern part of Carleton County, New Brunswick, Canada along the Saint John River. It held town status prior to 2023 and is now part of the town of Carleton North.

== History ==
Florenceville was originally known as Buttermilk Creek. In 1855 it was renamed Florenceville to honour Florence Nightingale, the famous Crimean War nurse. Florenceville was on the west side of the Saint John River and there the first post office and commercial section of the village was situated. In later years East Florenceville, previously known as Buckwheat Flats, became the commercial centre with five grocery stores and several other small businesses. There is a small strip mall along with several convenience stores and restaurants. The former village of Bristol is located on the Saint John River, in Carleton County, New Brunswick, Canada, approximately 5 kilometres north of Florenceville. It was named after the city of Bristol, England. The name replaced Kent Station in the 1880s.

Present-day Bristol was the site of a battle between the Mi'kmaq and Wolastoqiyik. The area was originally named Shiktehawk, from the Wolastoqey for "where he killed him". The name was changed when the New Brunswick Railway was constructed and railway officials were unable to pronounce the name correctly. Bristol is located where the Big Shiktehawk and Little Shiktehawk Streams empty into the Saint John River. This was an important stopping point for Native peoples as it was the start of the cross province route. They would canoe up the Big Shiktehawk Stream to Divide where they would portage a short distance to the Miramichi River and make their way to the eastern coast of New Brunswick.

On 1 January 2023, Florenceville-Bristol amalgamated with Bath, Centreville and all or part of nine local service districts to form the new town of Carleton North. The community's name remains in official use.

== Demographics ==
In the 2021 Census of Population conducted by Statistics Canada, Florenceville-Bristol had a population of 1,573 living in 681 of its 729 total private dwellings, a change of −1.9% from its 2016 population of 1,604. With a land area of 15.74 km^{2} (6.08 sq mi), it had a population density of 99.9/km^{2} (258.8/sq mi) in 2021.

== Economy ==
Florenceville-Bristol is home to the corporate headquarters for McCain Foods, the largest producer of French fries in the world. McCain also operates the Florenceville Airport, with a single paved runway located amid agricultural fields on the west side of the river.

Mountain View Packers is another potato-centred business that calls Florencenville-Bristol home. Mountain View Packers is a business that specializes in the processing of potatoes and cauliflower for the fresh market. Mountain View Packers sources all of their potatoes from local farmers while the cauliflower is grown on site at their own farm.

Florenceville-Bristol is also home to H.J. Crabbe & Sons Lumber Mill. This long-running family business specializes in its quality softwood lumber made mainly from Balsam Fir and White Spruce. The company has also recently built a new mill in the town to produce wood stove pellets in order to use more of what would be scrap material to help cut down on waste. The company is also one of the largest landowners in the province, next to Irving and Frasier.

A.N.D. Communications & Graphics is a graphics company situated in Florenceville-Bristol. A.N.D. Communications & Graphics specializes in providing the local area with signage and local advertisement solutions.

== Education ==
Both villages had schools offering grades 1 through 12 until 1956 when the Florenceville Regional High School was opened accommodating grades 7 through 12. The original schools became the elementary schools. Eventually these were replaced by an elementary school on the east side of the river. The Regional High School became a middle school when Carleton North High School was built in Bristol, NB. It was later decided that starting in the year 1996 the middle school students would not begin high school until grade 9.

Bristol is the home of Carleton North High School as well as Bristol Elementary School.

== Physical geography ==
Florenceville-Bristol lies within the Appalachian Mountain Range. The town sits in the Saint John River Valley. On each side of the town lie rolling mountains peaking at 300–400 metres. The borough of Florenceville lies on a flat that has extremely rich soil due to past volcanic activity before the last ice age. The borough of Bristol also lies on a flat, but much lower to the river and lower parts of the borough floods during the spring.

== Geology ==
The bedrock underlying Florenceville-Bristol at its oldest is part of the White Head Formation consisting of limestone and calcareous shales of Late Ordovician to Early Silurian in age. Later in history more sedimentary rocks were deposited forming the Smyrna Mills Formation during the Silurian, consisting of shales, limestones, and conglomerates. The range of mountains from North to South along the Eastern side of the Saint John River known as Carr Mountain, The Pinnacle, and Oakland Mountain (N to S) are also part of the Smyrna Mills Formation and consist of mafic volcanic flows (basalt) and tuff. Within these mountains there are also two gabbro tubes that are Early Devonian in age. These tubes probably were the magma feeding tubes for volcanic flow that would have once overlain the existing rock, but have since been eroded. Florenceville-Bristol are also extensively terraced with sands and gravels from both the workings of the Saint John River and its tributaries and also from the existence of a huge post-glacial lake that existed in the area for some time after the last Ice Age. In the areas that the bedrock is not covered by this aggregate material, the bedrock is covered by a thin veneer of glacial till. There is also an extensive fault trending through Florenceville-Bristol from NE to SW which the Saint John River follows for a short distance through the town, causing its seemingly odd bend in flow in the local area.

== Climate ==
The town gets a fair amount of precipitation, although major paralyzing snow and rain storms such as blizzards and hurricanes are uncommon but do happen on occasion. On average, Florenceville receives approximately 1100 mm of precipitation per year. Snowfall is common between late November and early April, and snow usually stays on the ground beginning in December. Flooding occurs during the spring of most years and affects the low-lying areas of Florenceville-Bristol.

Climate data for Centreville
Month	Jan	Feb	Mar	Apr	May	Jun	Jul	Aug	Sep	Oct	Nov	Dec	Year
Record high °C (°F)	12.0 (53.6)	11.0 (51.8)	19.5 (67.1)	30.0 (86.0)	35.0 (95.0)	35.0 (95.0)	35.0 (95.0)	35.0 (95.0)	31.0 (87.8)	26.1 (79.0)	19.0 (66.2)	13.3 (55.9)	35.0 (95.0)
Mean daily maximum °C (°F)	−6.2 (20.8)	−4.4 (24.1)	1.4 (34.5)	8.5 (47.3)	17.2 (63.0)	21.9 (71.4)	24.6 (76.3)	23.6 (74.5)	17.9 (64.2)	10.8 (51.4)	3.6 (38.5)	−4.0 (24.8)	9.6 (49.3)
Mean daily minimum °C (°F)	−16.9 (1.6)	−15.4 (4.3)	−9.0 (15.8)	−1.6 (29.1)	4.3 (39.7)	9.3 (48.7)	12.1 (53.8)	11.2 (52.2)	6.2 (43.2)	1.4 (34.5)	−4.1 (24.6)	−13.7 (7.3)	−1.4 (29.5)
Record low °C (°F)	−37.2 (−35.0)	−37.8 (−36.0)	−31.1 (−24.0)	−17.8 (0.0)	−10.0 (14.0)	−2.2 (28.0)	0.0 (32.0)	−3.5 (25.7)	−7.0 (19.4)	−10.0 (14.0)	−21.0 (−5.8)	−37.0 (−34.6)	−37.8 (−36.0)
Average precipitation mm (inches)	80.8 (3.18)	54.9 (2.16)	88.5 (3.48)	78.9 (3.11)	97.5 (3.84)	101.4 (3.99)	95.7 (3.77)	100.0 (3.94)	99.1 (3.90)	87.6 (3.45)	93.1 (3.67)	91.8 (3.61)	1,069.3 (42.10)
Source: 1971-2000 Environment Canada

== Attractions ==
It also has a free public art gallery. The Andrew and Laura McCain Gallery is a non-profit, community-supported gallery that shows about nine exhibitions a year of everything from exhibitions on loan from the National Gallery of Canada to the work of local school children.

Florenceville-Bristol is also home to the New Brunswick Potato Museum (Potato World) and Shogomoc Historical Railway Site. The Shogomoc Historical Railway Site showcases a restored CPR train station and three CPR cars and is home to Hunter Brothers Farm Market and Corn Maze.

The town celebrates many festivals throughout the year; Festival of Flavour, which takes place August and showcases a variety of wine related events, Canada Day-July, Snow Blast- February, Haunted Train October, Buttermilk Creek Fall Festival-September and more.

Throughout the summer season, July to September, the town is host to an outdoor summer market, every Thursday from 10-2 pm at the Riverside Park. The outdoor summer market features food, produce, craft, woodworking, flower, baked goods, local meat and jewellery vendors. Each week showcases a different musical performance from local entertainers.

The town is the site of the Florenceville Bridge, a covered bridge built in 1907 that is unique in New Brunswick in combining a wooden covered bridge with steel trusses for the central spans over the Saint John River.

Located just outside the town limits is a replica Noah's Ark, a 2/3-scale model of the Biblical Ark that Noah built, as described in the Christian Old Testament. The replica ark contains the offices and student dorms for a private Bible school, The School of The Spirit, run by the Burnham Road Ministries. The sight of a 300-foot boat in the middle of potato fields within sight of Bristol and Oakland Mountain often attracts curious visitors.

== See also ==
- List of communities in New Brunswick
- Carleton County, New Brunswick
- Amalgamations of New Brunswick
