= Southampton Parish, New Brunswick =

Southampton
- Parish
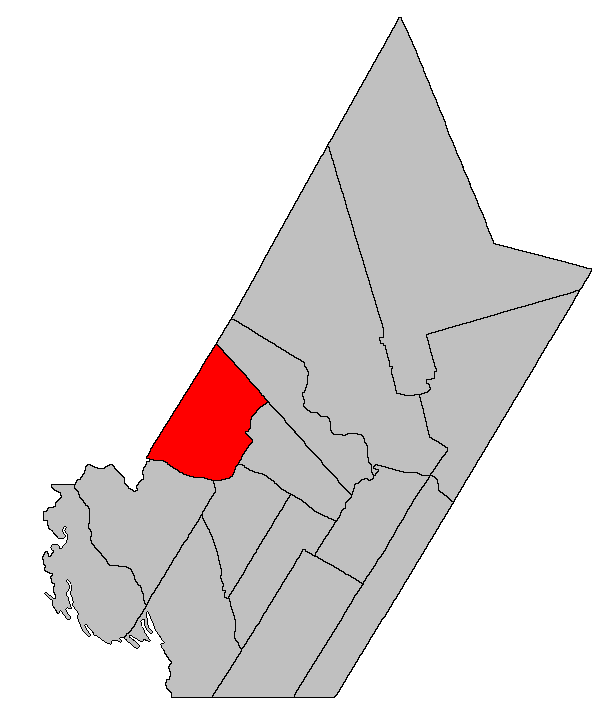
- Location within York County, New Brunswick.
- Coordinates: 45.9675°N 67.25°W
- Country: Canada
- Province: New Brunswick
- County: York
- Erected: 1833

Area
  - Land: 446.85 km^{2} (172.53 sq mi)

Population (2021)
  - Total: 1,497
  - Density: 3.4/km^{2} (8.8/sq mi)
  - Change 2016-2021: ▲0.9%
  - Dwellings: 699
- Time zone: UTC-4 (AST)
  - Summer (DST): UTC-3 (ADT)
- Figures do not include portions within the town of Nackawic and the village of Millville

Southampton is a geographic parish in York County, New Brunswick, Canada.

Prior to the 2023 governance reform, for governance purposes it was divided between the town of Nackawic, the village of Millville, and the local service district of the parish of Southampton, all of which were members of Capital Region Service Commission (RSC11).

== Origin of name ==
When Carleton County was erected in 1832 the new county line went through Northampton Parish. The next year the part of Northampton south of the line was erected as Southampton.

== History ==
Southampton was erected in 1833 from the part of Northampton Parish that was southeast of the Carleton County line.

In 1834 the county line was altered to run along grant lines, adding territory to Southampton.

In 1865 the boundary with Queensbury Parish was altered, removing territory east of the East Branch Nackawic Stream.

== Boundaries ==
Southampton Parish is bounded:

- on the northeast beginning on the Carleton County line about 600 metres northeasterly of Route 104, on the prolongation the central line of a two-lot grant to Jonathan Williams on the Saint John River, then running southeasterly along the prolongation to the Burnt Lake Branch;
- on the southeast by a line running down the Burnt Lake Branch and the East Branch Nackawic Stream to the northeastern line of a grant to John Morehouse, about 2.4 kilometres easterly of the junction of Caverhill Siding Road with Route 605, then southeasterly about 1.2 kilometres and southwesterly about 275 metres along the Morehouse grant to the prolongation of the southeastern line of a grant to William Dobie, then southeasterly about 675 metres along the Dobie grant to the prolongation of the southeastern line of a large grant to Captain Joseph Cunliffe, then southwesterly along the Cunliffe grant, striking the Saint John River about 150 metres downstream of the mouth of Quigg Brook, then up the Saint John;
- on the south by the Saint John River;
- on the northwest by the Carleton County line.

== Communities ==
Communities at least partly within the parish.

- Bates Settlement
- Bull Lake
- Campbell Settlement
- Caverhill
- Central Waterville
- Clarkville
- County Line
- East Waterville
- Hainesville
- Hartfield
- Hawkins Corner
- Maple Ridge
- Maplewood
- Middle Southampton
- Millville
- Nackawic
- Nortondale
- Pinder
- Ritchie
- Rossville
- South Waterville
- Southampton
- Southampton Junction
- Temperance Vale
- Temple
- Upper Southampton
- West Waterville
- Woodman
- Woodstock Road

== Bodies of water ==
Bodies of water (Note: Not including brooks, ponds or coves.) at least partly within the parish.

- Saint John River
  - Meductic Reach
  - Pokiok Reach
- Burnt Lake Branch
- Nackawic Stream
- Bulls Creek
- Farnhams Creek
- Gibson Creek
- Greer Creek
- Bull Lake
- Mactaquac Lake
- more than a half-dozen other officially named lakes

== Other notable places ==
Parks, historic sites, and other noteworthy places at least partly within the parish.

- Ayers Lake Stream Protected Natural Area
- Becaguimec Wildlife Management Area
- Carr Falls Brook Protected Natural Area
- Greer Creek Protected Natural Area
- Woodman Protected Natural Area

== Demographics ==
Parish population total does not include Millville and Nackawic

=== Population ===
Population trend

Census	Population	Change (%)
2016	1,484	▼3.5%
2011	1,538	▼3.9%
2006	1,601	▼7.9%
2001	1,738	▼1.8%
1996	1,769	▼3.3%
1991	1,829	N/A

=== Language ===
Mother tongue (2016)

Language	Population	Pct (%)
English only	1,425	96.0%
Other languages	20	1.3%
French only	40	2.7%
Both English and French	0	0%

== See also ==
- List of parishes in New Brunswick
