= York County, New Brunswick =

County in New Brunswick, Canada

Coordinates: 46°00′N 67°00′W

York
- County
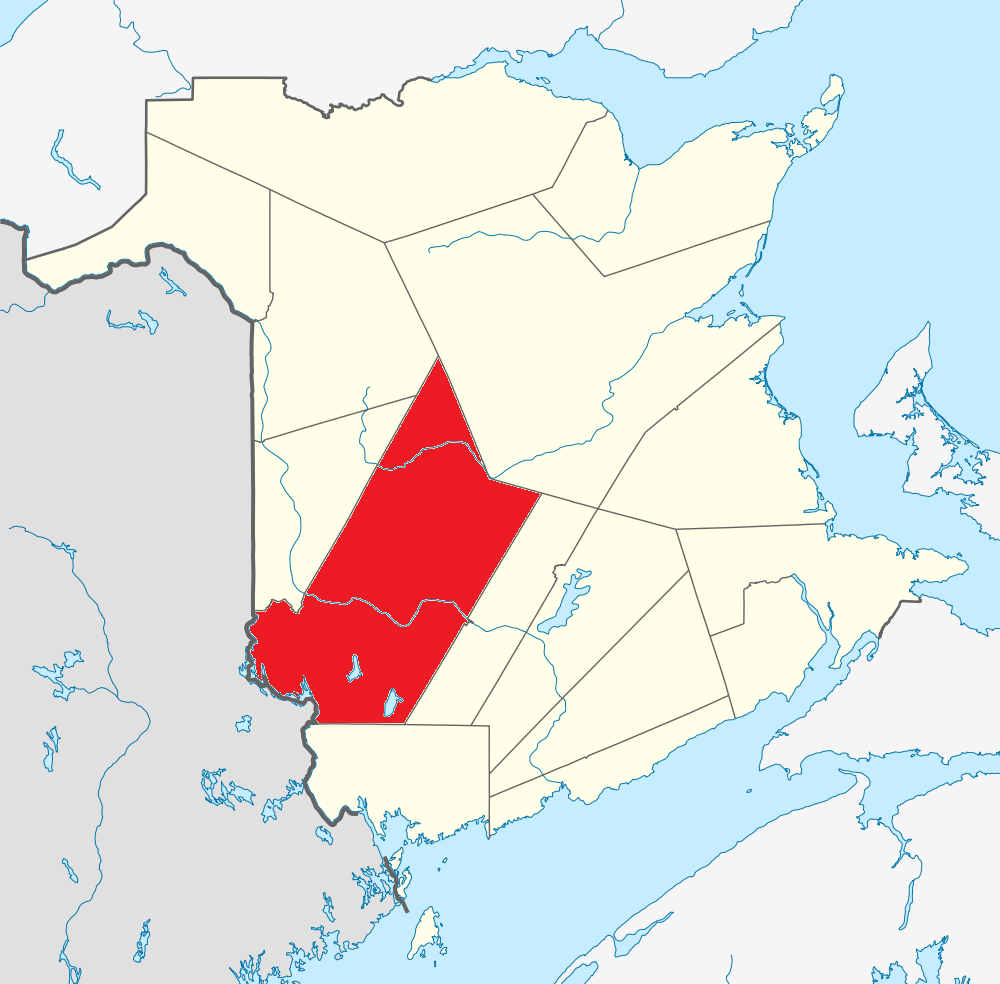
- Location within New Brunswick.
- Country: Canada
- Province: New Brunswick
- Established: 1785

Area
  - Land: 8,095.10 km^{2} (3,125.54 sq mi)

Population (2021)
  - Total: 105,261
  - Density: 13/km^{2} (34/sq mi)
  - Change 2016-2021: ▲5.8%
  - Dwellings: 48,294
- Time zone: UTC-4 (AST)
  - Summer (DST): UTC-3 (ADT)
- Area code: 506

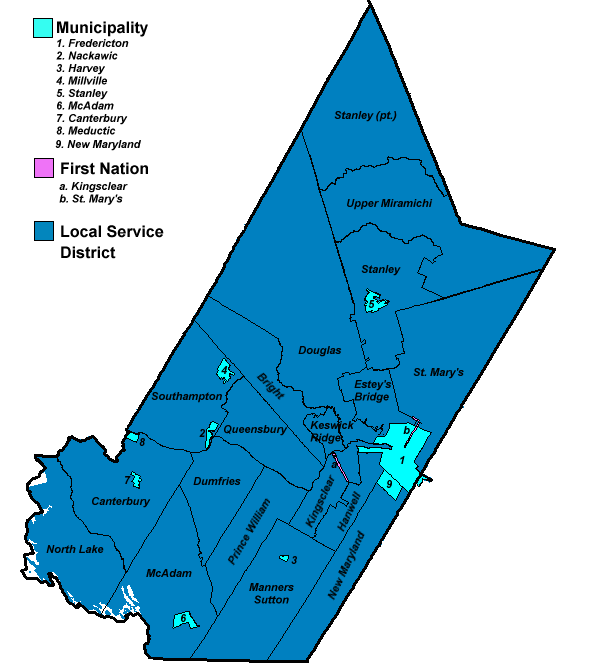
Map of municipal government units in York County.

York County (2021 population 105,261) is located in west-central New Brunswick, Canada. The county contains the provincial capital, Fredericton. Outside the city, farming and forestry are two major industries in the county, which is bisected by the Saint John River. The Southwest Miramichi River flows through the northern section of the county.

== History ==
York County was established in 1785, named after the second son of King George III, Prince Frederick-Augustus (1763–1827), who was made Duke of York in 1784. By 1831, the top half was highly populated, due to the rich soil in the region, so it was split off to become Carleton County.

== Census subdivisions ==
=== Communities ===
There are eleven municipalities within York County (listed by 2016 population):

Official name	Designation	Area km^{2}	Population	Parish
Fredericton	City	132.57	58,220	n/a
Hanwell	Rural community	151.32	4,750	n/a
New Maryland	Village	21.33	4,174	New Maryland
Upper Miramichi	Rural community	1,835.40	2,218	n/a
McAdam	Village	14.28	1,151	McAdam
Nackawic	Town	7.89	941	Southampton
Nashwaak	Rural community	17.11	412	Stanley
Harvey	Village	2.45	358	Manners Sutton
Canterbury	Village	5.33	336	Canterbury
Millville	Village	12.15	273	Southampton
Lakeland Ridges	Village	6.67	173	Canterbury

=== First Nations ===
There are two First Nations reserves in York County (listed by 2016 population):

Official name	Designation	Area km^{2}	Population	Parish
Devon 30	Reserve	2.72	1,038	Douglas
Kingsclear 6	Reserve	3.81	493	Kingsclear

=== Parishes ===
The county is subdivided into fourteen parishes (listed by 2016 population):

Official name	Area km^{2}	Population	Municipalities	Unincorporated communities
Douglas	1446.95	6,154	Devon 30 (reserve)	Birdton / Boyds Corner / Cardigan / Carlisle Road / Currieburg / Deersdale / Dorn Ridge / Dorn Ridge Road / Douglas / Estey's Bridge / Fredericksburg / Hamtown Corner / Hurlett / Jones Forks / Keswick / Kingsley / Lower Stoneridge / MacLean Settlement / McLeod Hill / Morehouse Corner / Napadogan / North Tay / Pughs Crossing / Royal Road / Tay Creek / Tay Mills / Upper Stoneridge
Saint Marys	752.68	4,837		Bantalor / Cross Creek Station / Durham Bridge / Glencoe / Lower Durham / Lower Durham Road / Manzer / Mount Hope / Nashwaak / Nashwaak Bridge / Nashwaak Village / Nashwaak West / Penniac / Ross / Saint Marys / Taymouth / Upper Durham / Upper Durham Road / Zionville
Bright	403.72	3,289		Barton / Brewers Mills / Bright / Burtts Corner / Cahill / Central Hainesville / Crocks Point / Greenhill / Greenhill Lake / Hayne / Howland Ridge / Howland Ridge Hill / Jewetts Mills / Keswick Ridge / Lower Hainesville / Mactaquac / Mactaquac Heights / McKeens Corner / Scotch Settlement / Sisson Settlement / Tripp Settlement / Upper Keswick / Vinegar Hill / Zealand
Kingsclear	152.06	2,822	Kingsclear 6 (reserve)	Carriage Hill / Central Kingsclear / French Village / Hanwell Hamlet / Island View / Kingsclear / Longs Creek / Mazerolle Settlement / Newmarket / Oswald Gray / Pinecrest Heights / Smithfield / Somerset Park / Starlight Village / Yoho
New Maryland	375.44	2,606	New Maryland (village)	Beaver Dam / Charters Settlement / Forbes Subdivision / Howarth Acres / Little Lake / Nasonworth / Rooth
Manners Sutton	525.56	1,777	Harvey Station (village)	Acton / Brockway / Christie Ridge / Coburn / Cork / Frog Lake / Harvey lake Shore / Harvey Settlement / Hurley Corner / Lower Brockway / Manners Sutton / Middle District / Prince William Station / Roach / South Tweedside / Swans Shore / Thomaston Corner / Upper Brockway / Upper Mills / Wilmot / York Mills
Southampton	450.04	1,484	Nackawic (town); Millville (village)	Bates Settlement / Bull Lake / Campbell Settlement / Caverhill / Central Waterville / Clarkville / County Line / East Waterville / Hainesville / Hartfield / Hawkins Corner / Maple Ridge / Maplewood / Nortondale / Pikes Peak / Pinder / Ritchie / Rossville / South Waterville / Southampton / Temperance Vale / Temple / West Waterville / Woodman / Woodstock Road
Queensbury	300.65	1,174		Bear Island / Day Hill / Dumfries / Granite Hill / Lower Caverhill / Lower Line Queensbury / Lower Queensbury / McNallys / Middle Hainesville / Scotch Lake / Springfield / Upper Caverhill / Upper Hainesville / Wiggins Mill / York
Stanley	1,222.02	832	Stanley (village)	Cross Creek / English Settlement / Giants Glen / Green Hill / Limekiln / Maple Grove / Maple Grove Station / Mavis Mills / Red Rock / South Portage / Sutherland Siding / Tay Falls / Tay Valley / Ward Settlement / Williamsburg / Woodlands
Prince William	287.71	930		Blaney Ridge / Donnelly Settlement / Lake George / Lake Road / Lower Prince William / Magaguadavic / Magaguadavic Siding / Magundy / Pokiok Settlement / Prince William / Rosborough Settlement
Canterbury	556.15	525	Canterbury (village); Meductic (village)	Benton / Carroll Ridge / Charlie Lake / Dead Creek / Deer Lake / Dorrington Hill / Dow Settlement / Eel River Lake / Hartin Settlement / Johnson Settlement / Marne / Middle Southampton / Scott Siding / Skiff Lake
Dumfries	302.72	356		Barony / Carson / Davidson Lake / Dumfries / Hawkshaw / Lower Dumfries / Murray / Pokiok
North Lake	440.03	233		Forest City / Fosterville / Graham Corner / Green Mountain / Maxwell / North Lake / Pemberton Ridge
McAdam	537.42	73	McAdam (village)	Burpee / Cottrell / St. Croix / Sugar Brook

== Demographics ==
As a census division in the 2021 Census of Population conducted by Statistics Canada, York County had a population of 105,261 living in 45,259 of its 48,294 total private dwellings, a change of 5.8% from its 2016 population of 99,453. With a land area of 8,095.1 km^{2} (3,125.5 sq mi), it had a population density of 13.0/km^{2} (33.7/sq mi) in 2021.

Population trend

Census	Population	Change (%)
2021	105,261	▲5.8%
2016	99,411	▲2.2%
2011	97,238	▲8.0%
2006	90,872	▲4.2%
2001	87,212	▲1.7%
1996	85,719	▲4.1%
1991	82,326	N/A

Mother tongue (2016)

Language	Population	Pct (%)
English only	84,370	85.6%
French only	6,560	6.7%
Other languages	6,825	6.9%
Both English and French	785	0.8%

== Transportation ==
=== Major highways ===
- Route 2 (TCH)
- Route 3
- Route 4
- Route 8
- Route 10
- Route 101
- Route 102
- Route 104
- Route 105
- Route 107
- Route 108
- Route 122
- Route 148
- Route 540
- Route 620
- Route 625
- Route 628
- Route 630

== See also ==
- List of communities in New Brunswick
