= List of communities in New Brunswick =

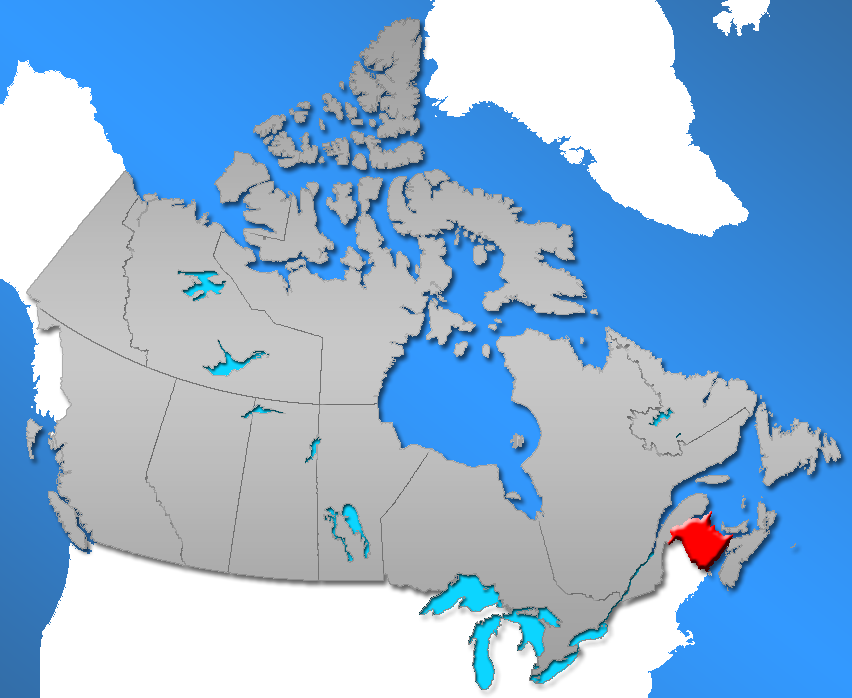
Communities in Canada's provinces and territories

This is a list of communities in New Brunswick, a province in Canada. For the purposes of this list, a community is defined as either an incorporated municipality, an Indian reserve, or an unincorporated community inside or outside a municipality.

== Municipalities ==
=== Cities ===
New Brunswick has eight cities.

Cities in New Brunswick
Name	County	Incorporation date	Council type	Council size	2021 Census of Population				
Name	County	Incorporation date	Council type	Council size	Population (2021)	Population (2016)	Change	Land area (km^{2})	Population density
Bathurst	Gloucester	January 1, 1966	Hybrid (Note: Bathurst is described as having a "hybrid" council type, containing both councillor and councillor ward seats.)	9	12,157	11,897	+2.2%	91.62	132.7/km^{2}
Campbellton	Restigouche	January 1, 1958	Ward	10	7,047	6,883	+2.4%	18.57	379.5/km^{2}
Dieppe	Westmorland	January 1, 2003	Ward	8	28,114	25,384	+10.8%	77.02	365.0/km^{2}
Edmundston	Madawaska	April 29, 1952	Ward	10	16,437	16,580	−0.9%	106.84	153.8/km^{2}
Fredericton	Sunbury & York	March 30, 1848	Ward	12	63,116	58,721	+7.5%	133.93	471.3/km^{2}
Miramichi	Northumberland	January 1, 1995	At-large	8	17,692	17,537	+0.9%	178.98	98.8/km^{2}
Moncton	Westmorland	April 23, 1890	Ward	10	79,470	71,889	+10.5%	140.67	564.9/km^{2}
Saint John	Saint John	May 18, 1785	Ward	10	69,895	67,575	+3.4%	315.59	221.5/km^{2}
Total cities					293,928	276,466	+6.3%	1,063.22	276.5/km^{2}
New Brunswick					775,610	747,101	+3.8%	71,248.5	10.9/km^{2}

=== Towns ===
New Brunswick has 27 towns.

Towns of New Brunswick
Name	Municipal type	County	Incorporation date	2021 Census of Population				
Name	Municipal type	County	Incorporation date	Population (2021)	Population (2016)	Change	Land area (km^{2})	Population density (/km^{2})
Beresford	Town	Gloucester	1967	4,294	4,288	+0.1%	19.24	223.2
Bouctouche	Town	Kent	1966	2,513	2,361	+6.4%	18.33	137.1
Caraquet	Town	Gloucester	1961	4,285	4,248	+0.9%	68.13	62.9
Dalhousie	Town	Restigouche	1905	3,223	3,126	+3.1%	15.12	213.2
Florenceville-Bristol	Town	Carleton	2008	1,573	1,604	−1.9%	15.74	99.9
Grand Bay-Westfield	Town	Kings	1998	4,967	4,964	+0.1%	59.82	83.0
Grand Falls	Town	Victoria	1890	5,220	5,326	−2.0%	18.04	289.4
Hampton	Town	Kings	1966	4,395	4,289	+2.5%	20.97	209.6
Hartland	Town	Carleton	1918	933	957	−2.5%	9.50	98.2
Lamèque	Town	Gloucester	1966	1,301	1,285	+1.2%	12.40	104.9
Nackawic	Town	York	1976	962	941	+2.2%	7.68	125.3
Oromocto	Town	Sunbury	1956	9,045	9,223	−1.9%	22.36	404.5
Quispamsis	Town	Kings	1966	18,768	18,245	+2.9%	56.97	329.4
Richibucto	Town	Kent	1966	1,411	1,266	+11.5%	11.90	118.6
Riverview	Town	Albert	1973	20,584	19,667	+4.7%	34.10	603.6
Rothesay	Town	Kings	1988	11,977	11,659	+2.7%	34.59	346.3
Sackville	Town	Westmorland	1903	6,099	5,331	+14.4%	73.91	82.5
Saint Andrews	Town	Charlotte	1903	2,048	1,786	+14.7%	8.35	245.3
Saint-Léonard	Town	Madawaska	1920	1,322	1,300	+1.7%	5.34	247.6
Saint-Quentin	Town	Restigouche	1947	2,141	2,194	−2.4%	4.24	505.0
Shediac	Town	Westmorland	1903	7,535	6,664	+13.1%	64.00	117.7
Shippagan	Town	Gloucester	1947	2,672	2,580	+3.6%	9.96	268.3
St. George	Town	Charlotte	1904	1,579	1,517	+4.1%	16.17	97.6
St. Stephen	Town	Charlotte	1973 (Note: St. Stephen was incorporated as a town in 1871 and amalgamated with Milltown in 1973 to form St. Stephen-Milltown; the name reverted to St. Stephen in 1975.)	4,510	4,415	+2.2%	13.72	328.7
Sussex	Town	Kings	1904	4,440	4,282	+3.7%	8.90	498.9
Woodstock	Town	Carleton	1856	5,553	5,228	+6.2%	14.96	371.2

=== Villages ===
New Brunswick has 66 villages.

Villages of New Brunswick
Name	Municipal type	County	Incorporation date	2021 Census of Population				
Name	Municipal type	County	Incorporation date	Population (2021)	Population (2016)	Change	Land area (km^{2})	Population density (/km^{2})
Alma	Village	Albert	1966	282	213	+32.4%	47.64	5.9
Aroostook	Village	Victoria	1966	313	306	+2.3%	2.23	140.4
Atholville	Village	Restigouche	1966	3,290	3,570	−7.8%	119.58	27.5
Balmoral	Village	Restigouche	1972	1,603	1,674	−4.2%	43.33	37.0
Bas-Caraquet	Village	Gloucester	1966	1,311	1,305	+0.5%	30.93	42.4
Bath	Village	Carleton	1966	440	476	−7.6%	2.00	220.0
Belledune	Village	Restigouche	1968	1,325	1,417	−6.5%	189.18	7.0
Bertrand	Village	Gloucester	1968	1,153	1,166	−1.1%	57.01	20.2
Blacks Harbour	Village	Charlotte	1972	907	894	+1.5%	9.02	100.6
Blackville	Village	Northumberland	1966	914	958	−4.6%	20.97	43.6
Cambridge-Narrows	Village	Queens	1966	715	562	+27.2%	106.79	6.7
Canterbury	Village	York	1966	320	336	−4.8%	5.32	60.2
Cap-Pelé	Village	Westmorland	1969	2,503	2,425	+3.2%	22.96	109.0
Centreville	Village	Carleton	1966	508	557	−8.8%	2.67	190.3
Charlo	Village	Restigouche	1966	1,323	1,310	+1.0%	31.45	42.1
Chipman	Village	Queens	1966	1,201	1,104	+8.8%	19.00	63.2
Doaktown	Village	Northumberland	1966	808	792	+2.0%	29.09	27.8
Dorchester	Village	Westmorland	1966	906	1,096	−17.3%	5.71	158.7
Drummond	Village	Victoria	1967	729	737	−1.1%	8.88	82.1
Eel River Crossing	Village	Restigouche	1966	1,844	1,953	−5.6%	65.26	28.3
Fredericton Junction	Village	Sunbury	1966	719	704	+2.1%	23.85	30.1
Gagetown	Village	Queens	1966	787	711	+10.7%	49.32	16.0
Grand Manan	Village	Charlotte	1995	2,595	2,360	+10.0%	150.56	17.2
Grande-Anse	Village	Gloucester	1968	731	899	−18.7%	24.27	30.1
Harvey	Village	York	1966	402	358	+12.3%	2.46	163.4
Hillsborough	Village	Albert	1966	1,348	1,277	+5.6%	12.81	105.2
Lac Baker	Village	Madawaska	1967	685	690	−0.7%	37.24	18.4
Le Goulet	Village	Gloucester	1986	749	793	−5.5%	5.40	138.7
Maisonnette	Village	Gloucester	1986	535	495	+8.1%	12.91	41.4
McAdam	Village	York	1966	1,173	1,151	+1.9%	14.19	82.7
Meductic	Village	York	1966	180	215	−16.3%	6.26	28.8
Memramcook	Village	Westmorland	1995	5,029	4,778	+5.3%	186.64	26.9
Millville	Village	York	1966	274	273	+0.4%	12.14	22.6
Minto	Village	Queens	1966	2,234	2,305	−3.1%	31.36	71.2
Neguac	Village	Northumberland	1967	1,692	1,684	+0.5%	26.72	63.3
New Maryland	Village	York	1991	4,153	4,174	−0.5%	21.25	195.4
Nigadoo	Village	Gloucester	1967	997	963	+3.5%	7.65	130.3
Norton	Village	Kings	1966	1,410	1,382	+2.0%	75.35	18.7
Paquetville	Village	Gloucester	1966	718	720	−0.3%	9.26	77.5
Perth-Andover	Village	Victoria	1966	1,574	1,590	−1.0%	8.96	175.7
Petitcodiac	Village	Westmorland	1966	1,476	1,383	+6.7%	17.18	85.9
Petit-Rocher	Village	Gloucester	1966	1,954	1,897	+3.0%	4.52	432.3
Plaster Rock	Village	Victoria	1966	1,002	1,023	−2.1%	3.01	332.9
Pointe-Verte	Village	Gloucester	1966	865	886	−2.4%	13.76	62.9
Port Elgin	Village	Westmorland	1922	381	408	−6.6%	2.65	143.8
Rexton	Village	Kent	1966	874	830	+5.3%	6.29	139.0
Riverside-Albert	Village	Albert	1966	348	350	−0.6%	3.39	102.7
Rivière-Verte	Village	Madawaska	1966	744	724	+2.8%	6.91	107.7
Rogersville	Village	Northumberland	1966	1,193	1,166	+2.3%	7.19	165.9
Saint-Antoine	Village	Kent	1966 (Note: Incorporated as St. Anthony but the name was changed to Saint-Antoine in 1969.)	1,791	1,733	+3.3%	6.32	283.4
Sainte-Anne-de-Madawaska	Village	Madawaska	1966	891	957	−6.9%	8.97	99.3
Sainte-Marie-Saint-Raphaël	Village	Gloucester	1966	820	879	−6.7%	15.84	51.8
Saint-Isidore	Village	Gloucester	1978	810	764	+6.0%	22.94	35.3
Saint-Léolin	Village	Gloucester	1966	615	647	−4.9%	19.73	31.2
Saint-Louis de Kent	Village	Kent	1986	981	856	+14.6%	1.98	495.5
Salisbury	Village	Westmorland	1966	2,387	2,284	+4.5%	13.56	176.0
St. Martins	Village	Saint John	1966	320	276	+15.9%	2.35	136.2
Stanley	Village	York	1966	397	412	−3.6%	16.93	23.4
Sussex Corner	Village	Kings	1966	1,458	1,461	−0.2%	9.32	156.4
Tide Head	Village	Restigouche	1966	951	938	+1.4%	19.34	49.2
Tracy	Village	Sunbury	1966	610	608	+0.3%	29.44	20.7

=== Regional municipalities ===
New Brunswick has one regional municipality.

=== Rural communities ===
New Brunswick has seven rural communities.

== Indian reserves ==
New Brunswick is home to 32 Indian reserves, of which 18 are recognized as census subdivisions by Statistics Canada.

Name as used by Indigenous and Northern Affairs Canada	First Nation(s)	Ethnic/national group	Tribal council	Treaty	Area		Population			Notes & references
Name as used by Indigenous and Northern Affairs Canada	First Nation(s)	Ethnic/national group	Tribal council	Treaty	ha	acre	2016	2011	% difference	Notes & references
Big Hole Tract 8 (North Half)	Metepenagiag Miꞌkmaq	Miꞌkmaq	North Shore Micmac District Council	n/a	1,396.2	3,450.1				
Big Hole Tract 8 (South Half)	Eel Ground	Miꞌkmaq	North Shore Micmac District Council	n/a	1,740.2	4,300.1	48	34	41.2%	
Buctouche 16	Buctouche MicMac	Miꞌkmaq	North Shore Micmac District Council	n/a	62.3	153.9	96	85	12.9%	
Buctouche Micmac Band Extension	Buctouche MicMac	Miꞌkmaq	North Shore Micmac District Council	n/a	89.6	221.4				
Devon 30	Saint Mary's	Wolastoqiyik	Wolastoqey Tribal Council	n/a	125.9	311.1	1,038	864	20.1%	
Eel Ground 2	Eel Ground	Miꞌkmaq	North Shore Micmac District Council	n/a	1,072.8	2,650.9	532	448	18.8%	
Eel River 3	Eel River Bar	Miꞌkmaq	North Shore Micmac District Council	n/a	122.0	301.5	329	320	2.8%	
Esgenoôpetitj	Esgenoopetitj	Miꞌkmaq	Mawiw Council Incorporated	n/a	985.4	2,435.0	1,179	1,046	12.7%	
Fort Folly 1	Fort Folly	Miꞌkmaq	North Shore Micmac District Council	n/a	56.1	138.6	40	48	-16.7%	
Indian Island 28	Indian Island	Miꞌkmaq	North Shore Micmac District Council	n/a	38.4	94.9	138	97	42.3%	
Indian Point 1	Metepenagiag Miꞌkmaq	Miꞌkmaq	North Shore Micmac District Council	n/a	41.2	101.8				
Indian Ranch	Eel River Bar	Miꞌkmaq	North Shore Micmac District Council	n/a	45.7	112.9	89	60	48.3%	
Kingsclear 6	Kingsclear	Maliseet	Wolastoqey Tribal Council	n/a	374.7	925.9	493	490	0.6%	
Metepenagiag Urban Reserve 3	Metepenagiag Miꞌkmaq	Miꞌkmaq	North Shore Micmac District Council	n/a	19.9	49.2				
Metepenagiag Urban Reserve 8	Metepenagiag Miꞌkmaq	Miꞌkmaq	North Shore Micmac District Council	n/a	3.6	8.9				
Metepenagiag Uta'nk	Metepenagiag Miꞌkmaq	Miꞌkmaq	North Shore Micmac District Council	n/a	1.1	2.7				
Moose Meadows 4	Eel River Bar	Miꞌkmaq	North Shore Micmac District Council	n/a	404.7	1,000.0				
Oinpegitjoig	Pabineau	Miꞌkmaq	North Shore Micmac District Council	n/a	18.6	46.0				
Oromocto 26	Oromocto	Wolastoqiyik	Wolastoqey Tribal Council	n/a	100.7	248.8	282	286	-1.4%	
Pabineau 11	Pabineau	Miꞌkmaq	North Shore Micmac District Council	n/a	429.1	1,060.3	134	141	-5%	
Pokemouche 13	Esgenoopetitj	Miꞌkmaq	Mawiw Council Incorporated	n/a	151.4	374.1				
Red Bank 4	Metepenagiag Miꞌkmaq	Miꞌkmaq	North Shore Micmac District Council	n/a	1,457.0	3,600.3	309	352	-12.2%	
Red Bank 7	Metepenagiag Miꞌkmaq	Miꞌkmaq	North Shore Micmac District Council	n/a	1,011.7	2,500.0				
Renous 12	Eel Ground	Miꞌkmaq	North Shore Micmac District Council	n/a	10.0	24.7				
Richibucto 15	Elsipogtog	Miꞌkmaq	Mawiw Council Incorporated	n/a	1,956.2	4,833.9	1,937	1,985	-2.4%	
Soegao No. 35	Elsipogtog	Miꞌkmaq	Mawiw Council Incorporated	n/a	130.1	321.5				
St Basile 10	Madawaska Maliseet	Maliseet	Wolastoqey Tribal Council	n/a	344.8	852.0	214	205	4.4%	
St. Mary's 24	Saint Mary's	Wolastoqiyik	Wolastoqey Tribal Council	n/a	1.0	2.5				
Tabusintac 9	Esgenoopetitj	Miꞌkmaq	Mawiw Council Incorporated	n/a	3,268.7	8,077.1	10	10	0%	
The Brothers 18	Kingsclear; Madawaska Maliseet; Tobique; Woodstock	Maliseet	Wolastoqey Tribal Council; Wolastoqey Tribal Council; Mawiw Council Incorporated —	n/a	4.0	9.9				
Tobique 20	Tobique	Maliseet	Mawiw Council Incorporated	n/a	2,724.0	6,731.2	968	1,039	-6.8%	
Woodstock 23	Woodstock	Maliseet	—	n/a	159.8	394.9	327	345	-5.2%	

== First Nations ==
New Brunswick is home to 15 First Nations.

Name as used by Indigenous and Northern Affairs Canada	Ethnic/national group	Population (July 2021)			Notes
Name as used by Indigenous and Northern Affairs Canada	Ethnic/national group	On reserve	Off reserve	Total	Notes
Buctouche MicMac	Miꞌkmaq	80	42	122	
Eel Ground	Miꞌkmaq	593	483	1,076	
Eel River Bar	Miꞌkmaq	362	441	803	
Elsipogtog	Miꞌkmaq	2,738	761	3,499	
Esgenoopetitj (Burnt Church)	Miꞌkmaq	1,382	559	1,941	
Fort Folly	Miꞌkmaq	35	101	136	
Indian Island	Miꞌkmaq	112	100	212	
Kingsclear	Wolastoqiyik	739	325	1,064	
Madawaska Maliseet	Wolastoqiyik	163	217	380	
Metepenagiag Miꞌkmaq	Miꞌkmaq	465	237	702	
Oromocto	Wolastoqiyik	342	460	802	
Pabineau	Miꞌkmaq	105	238	343	
Saint Mary's	Wolastoqiyik	940	1,084	2,024	
Tobique	Wolastoqiyik	1,594	976	2,570	
Woodstock	Wolastoqiyik	301	854	1,155	
Total population		9,951	6,878	16,829	

== Parishes ==
New Brunswick has 152 parishes, of which 142 are recognized as census subdivisions by Statistics Canada and six as dissolved census subdivisions.

Parishes of New Brunswick
Name	County	Population (2021)	Population (2016)	Change (%)	Area (km²)	Population density
Aberdeen	Carleton	812	781	▲4.0	444.88	1.8
Acadieville	Kent	752	709	▲6.1	332.08	2.3
Addington	Restigouche	698	656	▲6.4	933.00	0.7
Allardville	Gloucester	1,949	2,032	▼4.1	654.60	3.0
Alma	Albert	5	5	Steady	222.74	0.0
Alnwick	Northumberland	3,615	3,640	▼0.7	668.84	5.4
Andover	Victoria	879	891	▼1.3	123.42	7.1
Baker Brook	Madawaska	not profiled after 2016				
Balmoral	Restigouche	309	278	▲11.2	1,088.01	0.3
Bathurst	Gloucester	4,761	4,797	▼0.8	1,502.74	3.2
Beresford	Gloucester	6,226	6,248	▼0.4	455.61	13.7
Blackville	Northumberland	1,996	2,028	▼1.6	823.93	2.4
Blissfield	Northumberland	491	451	▲8.9	1,235.57	0.4
Blissville	Sunbury	777	819	▼5.1	341.74	2.3
Botsford	Westmorland	1,120	1,058	▲5.9	304.62	3.7
Bright	York	3,317	3,289	▲0.9	403.73	8.2
Brighton	Carleton	1,596	1,735	▼8.0	509.30	3.1
Brunswick	Queens	224	203	▲10.3	703.20	0.3
Burton	Sunbury	5,176	5,119	▲1.1	258.39	20.0
Cambridge	Queens	684	647	▲5.7	113.17	6.0
Campobello (Note: The local service district of the parish of Campobello was incorporated as a rural community on 1 November 2010; the parish itself still legally exists and appears in the Territorial Division Act. The data here is for the rural community of Campobello Island.)	Charlotte	949	872	▲8.8	39.59	24.0
Canning	Queens	1,028	924	▲11.3	173.25	5.9
Canterbury	York	552	525	▲5.1	550.7	1.0
Caraquet	Gloucester	1,261	1,337	▼5.7	109.32	11.5
Cardwell	Kings	1,401	1,353	▲3.5	311.87	4.5
Carleton	Kent	764	708	▲7.9	435.23	1.8
Chatham	Northumberland	527	511	▲3.1	22.70	23.2
Chipman	Queens	853	913	▼6.6	483.45	1.8
Clair	Madawaska	not profiled after 2016				
Clarendon	Charlotte	66	63	▲4.8	492.11	0.1
Colborne	Restigouche	266	227	▲17.2	753.38	0.4
Coverdale	Albert	4,766	4,466	▲6.7	236.00	20.2
Dalhousie	Restigouche	1,090	1,067	▲2.2	62.62	17.4
Denmark	Victoria	1,424	1,471	▼3.2	751.08	1.9
Derby	Northumberland	938	976	▼3.9	61.00	15.4
Dorchester	Westmorland	438	429	▲2.1	90.13	4.9
Douglas (Note: 2016 figure adjusted for subsequent change in boundaries.)	York	5,935	5,703	▲1.2	1,446.95	4.3
Drummond	Victoria	2,095	2,157	▼2.9	1,013.66	2.1
Dufferin	Charlotte	565	573	▼1.4	12.34	45.8
Dumbarton	Charlotte	346	335	▲3.3	373.20	0.9
Dumfries	York	420	356	▲18.0	298.51	1.4
Dundas	Kent	4,332	3,914	▲10.7	172.32	25.1
Durham	Restigouche	950	1,076	▼11.7	409.78	2.3
Eldon	Restigouche	674	672	▼5.9	1,681.46	0.4
Elgin	Albert	1,064	892	▲19.3	519.54	2.0
Gagetown	Queens	324	311	▲4.2	234.58	1.4
Gladstone	Sunbury	486	452	▲7.5	362.08	1.3
Glenelg	Northumberland	1,532	1,560	▼1.8	504.78	3.0
Gordon	Victoria	1,559	1,493	▲4.4	1,430.19	1.1
Grand Falls	Victoria	1,077	1,109	▼2.9	158.09	6.8
Grand Manan	Charlotte	139	145	▼4.1	5.96	23.3
Greenwich	Kings	1,126	1,058	▲6.4	114.56	9.8
Grimmer	Restigouche	not profiled after 2016				
Hammond	Kings	276	251	▲10.0	244.24	1.1
Hampstead	Queens	288	277	▲4.0	212.39	1.4
Hampton	Kings	2,969	2,809	▲5.7	121.24	24.5
Harcourt	Kent	346	346	Steady	1,169.20	0.3
Hardwicke	Northumberland	2,203	2,201	▲0.1	275.95	8.0
Harvey	Albert	358	333	▲7.5	276.85	1.3
Havelock	Kings	1,042	1,061	▼1.8	349.22	3.0
Hillsborough	Albert	1,397	1,308	▲6.8	304.03	4.6
Hopewell	Albert	597	647	▼7.7	149.14	4.0
Huskisson	Kent	5	15	▼66.7	369.31	0.0
Inkerman	Gloucester	2,373	2,366	▲0.3	107.63	22.0
Johnston	Queens	638	560	▲13.9	360.87	1.8
Kars	Kings	377	325	▲16.0	75.54	5.0
Kent	Carleton	1,966	2,153	▼8.7	839.76	2.3
Kingsclear	York	2,839	2,822	▲0.6	150.11	18.9
Kingston	Kings	3,202	2,913	▲9.9	200.41	16.0
Lac Baker	Madawaska	not profiled after 2016				
Lepreau	Charlotte	803	707	▲13.6	209.52	3.8
Lincoln	Sunbury	7,519	7,177	▲4.8	159.44	47.2
Lorne	Victoria	313	464	▼32.5	1,632.21	0.2
Ludlow (Note: The local service district of Parish of Ludlow was replaced on 10 March 1971 by the new local service district of Upper Miramichi, which also included part of the local service district of the parish of Stanley; Upper Miramichi was incorporated as a rural community on 17 March 2008. The parish itself still legally exists and appears in the Territorial Division Act.)	Northumberland	not profiled after 2011				
Madawaska	Madawaska	0	10	▼100.0	173.42	0.0
Manners Sutton	York	1,920	1,777	▲8.0	524.75	3.7
Maugerville	Sunbury	1,772	1,831	▼3.2	919.94	1.9
McAdam	York	61	73	▼16.4	534.77	0.1
Moncton	Westmorland	10,704	9,811	▲9.1	564.16	19.0
Musquash	Saint John	1,253	1,194	▲4.9	233.06	5.4
Nelson	Northumberland	929	952	▼2.4	353.68	2.6
New Bandon	Gloucester	1,200	1,214	▼1.2	359.28	3.3
New Maryland	York	2,806	2,606	▲7.7	375.02	7.5
Newcastle	Northumberland	1,149	1,136	▲1.1	578.70	2.0
North Lake	York	282	233	▲21.0	439.6	0.6
Northampton	Carleton	1,875	1,724	▲8.8	243.31	7.7
Northesk	Northumberland	2,169	2,263	▼4.2	3,346.76	0.6
Northfield	Sunbury	577	620	▼6.9	303.27	1.9
Norton	Kings	1,325	1,301	▲1.8	144.77	9.2
Notre-Dame-de-Lourdes	Madawaska	253	275	▼8.0	186.30	1.4
Paquetville	Gloucester	2,250	2,329	▼3.4	220.42	10.2
Peel	Carleton	1,198	1,196	▲0.2	112.74	10.6
Pennfield	Charlotte	2,222	2,170	▲2.4	363.75	6.1
Perth	Victoria	1,047	1,082	▼3.2	318.10	3.3
Petersville	Queens	710	681	▲4.3	589.95	1.2
Prince William	York	1,083	930	▲16.5	284.39	3.8
Queensbury	York	1,237	1,174	▲5.4	294.35	4.2
Richibucto	Kent	2,085	1,872	▲11.4	249.21	8.4
Richmond	Carleton	1,456	1,303	▲11.7	258.80	5.6
Rivière-Verte	Madawaska	657	711	▼7.6	715.72	0.9
Rogersville	Northumberland	1,072	1,102	▼2.7	326.27	3.3
Rothesay	Kings	342	325	▲5.2	7.26	47.1
Sackville	Westmorland	1,204	1,182	▲1.9	578.9	2.1
Saint-André (Note: Figures are for rural community of Saint-André, which includes all of parish not included in town of Grand Falls.)	Madawaska	1,794	1,901	▼5.6	136.19	13.2
Saint Andrews	Charlotte	550	553	▼0.5	24.27	22.7
Sainte-Anne	Madawaska	936	964	▼2.9	368.76	2.5
Saint-Basile	Madawaska	736	592	▲24.3	129.96	5.7
Saint-Charles	Kent	2,024	1,997	▲1.4	175.07	11.6
Saint Croix	Charlotte	648	657	▼1.4	78.60	8.2
Saint David	Charlotte	1,470	1,529	▼3.9	190.39	7.7
Saint-François	Madawaska	not profiled after 2016				
Saint George	Charlotte	2,495	2,341	▲6.6	500.05	5.0
Saint-Hilaire	Madawaska	not profiled after 2016				
Saint-Isidore	Gloucester	1,312	1,361	▼3.6	173.14	7.6
Saint-Jacques	Madawaska	1,652	1,596	▲3.5	298.44	5.5
Saint James	Charlotte	1,024	1,186	▼13.7	552.90	1.9
Saint-Joseph	Madawaska	1,549	1,538	▲0.7	321.42	4.8
Saint-Léonard	Madawaska	858	975	▼12.0	344.85	2.5
Saint-Louis	Kent	1,760	1,802	▼2.3	258.65	6.8
Sainte-Marie (Note: The official name is Sainte-Marie in both languages.)	Kent	1,991	1,972	▲1.0	238.32	8.4
Saint Martins	Saint John	1,177	1,132	▲4.0	629.00	1.9
Saint Marys	York	5,084	4,837	▲5.1	751.90	6.8
Saint Patrick	Charlotte	710	689	▲3.0	236.59	3.0
Saint-Paul	Kent	877	842	▲4.2	228.41	3.8
Saint-Quentin	Restigouche	1,504	1,532	▼1.8	2,474.01	0.6
Saint Stephen	Charlotte	1,671	1,839	▼9.1	102.83	16.3
Salisbury	Westmorland	3,377	3,388	▼0.3	874.00	3.9
Saumarez	Gloucester	not profiled after 2016				
Shediac	Westmorland	5,144	4,789	▲7.4	178.79	28.8
Sheffield	Sunbury	888	809	▲9.8	271.29	3.3
Shippegan	Gloucester	4,781	4,800	▼0.4	204.52	23.4
Simonds	Carleton	514	473	▲8.7	75.57	6.8
Simonds	Saint John	3,913	3,843	▲1.8	281.06	13.9
Southampton	York	1,497	1,484	▲0.9	446.85	3.4
Southesk	Northumberland	1,666	1,694	▼1.7	2,462.60	0.7
Springfield	Kings	1,641	1,525	▲7.6	248.53	6.6
Stanley	York	920	832	▲10.6	1,218.38	0.8
Studholm	Kings	3,527	3,522	▲0.1	448.98	7.9
Sussex	Kings	2,579	2,516	▲2.5	243.99	10.6
Upham	Kings	1,357	1,269	▲6.9	189.21	7.2
Wakefield	Carleton	2,722	2,767	▼1.6	196.31	13.9
Waterborough	Queens	903	847	▲6.6	443.16	2.0
Waterford	Kings	491	469	▲4.7	221.27	2.2
Weldford	Kent	1,335	1,333	▲0.2	607.56	2.2
Wellington	Kent	3,292	3,079	▲6.9	184.80	17.8
West Isles	Charlotte	718	797	▼9.9	38.32	18.7
Westfield	Kings	2,114	1,962	▲7.7	295.34	7.2
Westmorland	Westmorland	997	908	▲9.8	173.27	5.8
Wickham	Queens	409	427	▼4.2	160.54	2.5
Wicklow	Carleton	1,591	1,697	▼6.2	195.50	8.1
Wilmot	Carleton	969	1,022	▼5.2	191.40	5.1
Woodstock	Carleton	2,219	2,178	▲1.9	194.83	11.4
Total parishes (Note: These totals are not inclusive of any portions within cities, town, villages, incorporated rural communities, regional municipality, or Indian reserves. Totals are calculated; non-CSDs are not included.)		227,326	222,338	▲2.2	63,325.23	3.6

== Neighbourhoods ==
Neighbourhoods of New Brunswick
Name	Part of	Amalgamation date	Pop. 2012	Pop. 2010	Other
Rough Waters	Bathurst				
Blair Athol	Balmoral				
Bass River	Bathurst				
Jacquet River	Belledune	1994			
Lily Lake Road	Campbellton	1958			
St Albert	Campbellton	1958			
Richardsville	Campbellton	1979			
Darlington	Dalhousie	1982			
St-Jacques	Edmundston	1998			
St-Basile	Edmundston	1998			
Verret	Edmundston	1998			
Florenceville	Florenceville-Bristol	2008			
Bristol	Florenceville-Bristol	2008			
Devon	Fredericton	1945			
Marysville	Fredericton	1973			
Barkers Point	Fredericton	1973			
Nashwaaksis	Fredericton	1973			
Silverwood	Fredericton	1973			
Grand Bay	Grand Bay-Westfield	1998			
Westfield	Grand Bay-Westfield	1998			
Pamdenec	Grand Bay-Westfield	1988			and part of the Parish of Westfield
North Head	Grand Manan	1995			
Seal Cove	Grand Manan	1995			
Grand Harbour	Grand Manan	1995			
Ingalls Head	Grand Manan	1995			
Woodwards Cove	Grand Manan	1995			
Castalia	Grand Manan	1995			
Newcastle	Miramichi	1995			
Chatham	Miramichi	1995			
Douglastown	Miramichi	1995			
Loggieville	Miramichi	1995			
Nelson-Miramichi	Miramichi	1995			
Nowlanville	Miramichi	1995			
Gondola Point	Quispamsis	1998			
Wells	Quispamsis	1998			
Albert	Riverside-Albert	1966			
Riverside	Riverside-Albert	1966			
East Riverside-Kingshurst	Rothesay	1998			
Fairvale	Rothesay	1998			
Wells	Rothesay	1998			Western Section
Carleton	Saint John	1785			
Indiantown	Saint John				
Fairville	Saint John				
Lorneville / Pisarinco	Saint John	1969			
Milford	Saint John				
Millidgeville	Saint John				
Mount Pleasant	Saint John				
Parrtown	Saint John	1785			
Portland	Saint John	1889			
Randolph	Saint John				
Loch Lomond	Saint John				
Simonds Parish	Saint John	1967			
Lancaster Parish	Saint John	1967			
Lancaster	Saint John	1967			
Milltown	Saint Stephen	1973			
Tracadie	Tracadie-Sheila	1991			
Sheila	Tracadie-Sheila	1991			

== Other communities and settlements ==
This is a list of communities and settlements in New Brunswick.

=== A–B ===
A

- Aboujagne
- Acadie
- Acadie Siding
- Acadieville
- Adams Gulch
- Adamsville
- Albert Mines
- Albrights Corner
- Alderwood
- Aldouane
- Allainville
- Allardville
- Allison
- Ammon
- Anagance
- Anderson Road
- Anderson Settlement
- Andersonville
- Anfield
- Anse-Bleue
- Apohaqui
- Arbeau Settlement
- Armond
- Arthurette
- Ashland
- Astle
- Aulac
- Avondale

B

- Back Bay
- Bagdad
- Baie-Sainte-Anne
- Baie Verte
- Bailey
- Balla Philip
- Barnaby
- Barnesville
- Barryville
- Bass River
- Bates Settlement
- Bay du Vin
- Bayside
- Beaverbrook
- Beaver Dam
- Bellefleur
- Belledune
- Benjamin River
- Berwick
- Bettsburg
- Big Hole
- Big River
- Blackland (Restigouche)
- Black Point
- Black River
- Black River-Hardwicke
- Black River Bridge
- Bloomfield
- Bloomfield
- Bloomfield Ridge
- Boiestown
- Bocabec
- Boundary Creek
- Brantville
- Brockway
- Browns Flat
- Bull Lake
- Burnsville
- Burton
- Burtts Corner

Top of page

=== C–G ===
C

- Cains River
- Caithness
- Camp Harmony
- Campbell Settlement
- Canton-des-Basque
- Cantor
- Caribou Depot
- Caron Brook
- Carrolls Crossing
- Casillis
- Caverhill
- Chamcook
- Chapel Grove
- Chatham Head
- Chelmsford
- Clarkville
- Cloverdale
- Cocagne
- Colebrooke Settlement
- Coles Island
- Collette
- Connors
- Cornhill
- Coteau Road

D

- Dalhousie Junction
- Damascus
- Daulnay
- Dawsonville
- Debec
- Derby
- Devereaux
- Digdeguash
- Douglas
- Dubé Settlement
- Duffys Corner
- Dugas
- Duguayville
- Dumfries
- Dundee
- Dunlop
- Durham Bridge

E

- Eel Ground
- Eel River Cove
- Elgin
- Elm Hill
- Escuminac
- Esgenoôpetitj
- Evandale
- Évangéline
- Evergreen (formerly Squaw Cap)

F

- Fairisle
- Five Fingers
- Flatlands
- Fords Mills
- Four Falls

G

- Gauvreau
- Geary
- Glassville
- Glencoe
- Glen Levit
- Glenwood, Northumberland County
- Glenwood, Restigouche County
- Gondola Point
- Gordonsville
- Grafton
- Grand Falls Portage
- Grande-Digue
- Gravel Hill
- Gray Rapids

Top of page

=== H–L ===
H

- Hainesville
- Hampstead
- Hanwell
- Harcourt
- Hardwood Ridge
- Hatfield Point
- Hardwicke
- Hartfield
- Harvey

Haute-Aboujagane

- Haut-Lamèque
- Haut-Sheila
- Havelock
- Hawkshaw
- Hazeldean
- Head of Millstream
- Hebron
- Holtville
- Honeydale
- Howard
- Hoyt
- Humphrey Corner

I

- Indian Mountain
- Inkerman
- Irishtown

J

- Janeville
- Jemseg
- Johnsville
- Juniper

K

- Kedgwick River
- Keswick Ridge
- Kingsclear
- Kingston
- Kouchibouguac

L

- L'Etang
- Lac-des-Lys
- Lac Unique
- Lagacéville
- Lake George
- Lakeville
- Lakeville
- LaPlante
- Lavillette
- Lawrence Station
- Limestone, Carleton County
- Limestone, Victoria County
- Lincoln
- Little Shemogue
- Lockstead
- Lorne
- Losier Settlement
- Lower Coverdale
- Lower Newcastle
- Ludlow
- Lutes Mountain

Top of page

=== M–P ===
M

- Mactaquac
- Madran
- Magaguadavic Settlement
- Magundy
- Malauze
- Maltais
- Maltampec
- Mann Mountain Settlement
- Maple Green
- Maple Ridge
- Maugerville
- McGivney
- McGraw Brook
- McKendrick
- McKenzie Corner
- McLeods
- McNamee
- McNeish
- Menneval
- Midland
- Midland
- Millerton
- Miramichi Bay
- Moulin-Morneault
- Mount Hebron
- Mount Middleton
- Mountain Brook

N

- Napadogan
- Napan
- Nash Creek
- Nashwaak Bridge
- Nashwaak Village
- Nasonworth
- Nauwigewauk
- Nelson Hollow
- New Avon
- New Denmark
- New England Settlement
- New Jersey
- New Mills
- New Zion
- Nicholas-Denys
- Noonan
- Nordin
- North Forks
- North Head
- North Tetagouche
- Northampton
- Notre-Dame
- Notre-Dame-de-Lourdes
- Notre-Dame-des-Érables

O

- Oak Bay
- Odell
- Ortonville
- Oxbow

P

- Pabineau Falls
- Parker Ridge
- Pembroke
- Penniac
- Penobsquis
- Petit-Ouest
- Petite-Lamèque
- Petite-Réserve
- Petite-Rivière-de-l'Ile
- Pigeon Hill
- Pinder
- Pocologan
- Point La Nim
- Pointe-à-Bouleau
- Pointe-Alexandre
- Pointe-Canot
- Pointe-du-Chene
- Pointe-Sapin
- Pokemouche
- Pokeshaw
- Pokesudie
- Pokiok
- Pont-Lafrance
- Pont-Landry
- Popelogan Depot
- Porten
- Priceville
- Prince William

Top of page

=== Q–S ===
Q

- Quatre-Milles
- Quispamsis

R

- Ramsay Sheds
- Rang-Double-Nord
- Rang-Double-Sud
- Rang-Sept
- Red Bank
- Richibouctou-Village
- Riley Brook
- Ripples
- Rivière-du-Portage
- Rivière-Verte
- Robertville
- Robinsonville
- Rosaireville
- Rossville
- Rothesay

S

- Saint-Arthur
- Saint-Charles
- Saint-Ignace
- Saint-Irenée
- Saint-Jean-Baptiste-de-Restigouche
- Saint-Joseph-de-Madawaska
- Saint-Laurent
- Saint-Martin-de-Restigouche
- Saint-Maure
- Saint-Norbert
- Saint-Sauveur
- Saint-Simon
- Sainte-Anne-de-Kent
- Sainte-Louise
- Sainte-Marie-de-Kent
- Sainte-Rose
- Salmon Beach
- Saumarez
- Scotch Lake
- Scoudouc
- Seal Cove
- Sea Side
- Sevogle
- Shannonvale
- Sheffield
- Shemogue
- Shepody
- Siegas
- Sillikers
- Simpsons Field
- Sisson Ridge
- Six-Milles
- Skiff Lake
- Slope Road
- Southampton
- South Tetagouche
- Speerville
- Springfield
- St. Margarets
- Stickney
- Strathadam
- Stonehaven
- Sunny Corner
- Sussex

Top of page

=== T–Z ===
T

- Tabusintac
- Targettville
- Taxis River
- Taymouth
- Temperance Vale
- Tetagouche Falls
- Thibault
- Tinker
- Titusville
- Tracadie Beach
- Tracadie–Sheila
- Tracy Depot
- Tremblay

U

- Upper Blackville
- Upper Charlo
- Upper Crossing
- Upper Kent
- Upper Queensbury
- Upsalquitch

V

- Val-Comeau
- Val-d'Amour
- Val-Doucet
- Val-Melanson
- Victoria Corner
- Village-Blanchard
- Village-Saint-Laurent

W

- Waterville
- Waterville
- Wayerton
- Weaver Siding
- Welsford
- White Rapids
- Whites Brook
- Whites Cove
- Wicklow
- Williamstown
- Willow Grove
- Wilsons Beach
- Wirral
- Wyers Brook

Z

- Zealand

Top of page

== See also ==
- Demographics of New Brunswick
- Geography of New Brunswick
- List of cities in New Brunswick
- List of neighbourhoods in New Brunswick
- List of municipalities in New Brunswick
- List of counties of New Brunswick
- List of parishes in New Brunswick
- List of towns in New Brunswick
- List of villages in New Brunswick

== Notes ==
Cities

Parishes
