= Greater Fredericton =

Metropolitan area in New Brunswick, Canada

- Census Metropolitan Area
- Fredericton, N.B. Census Metropolitan Area
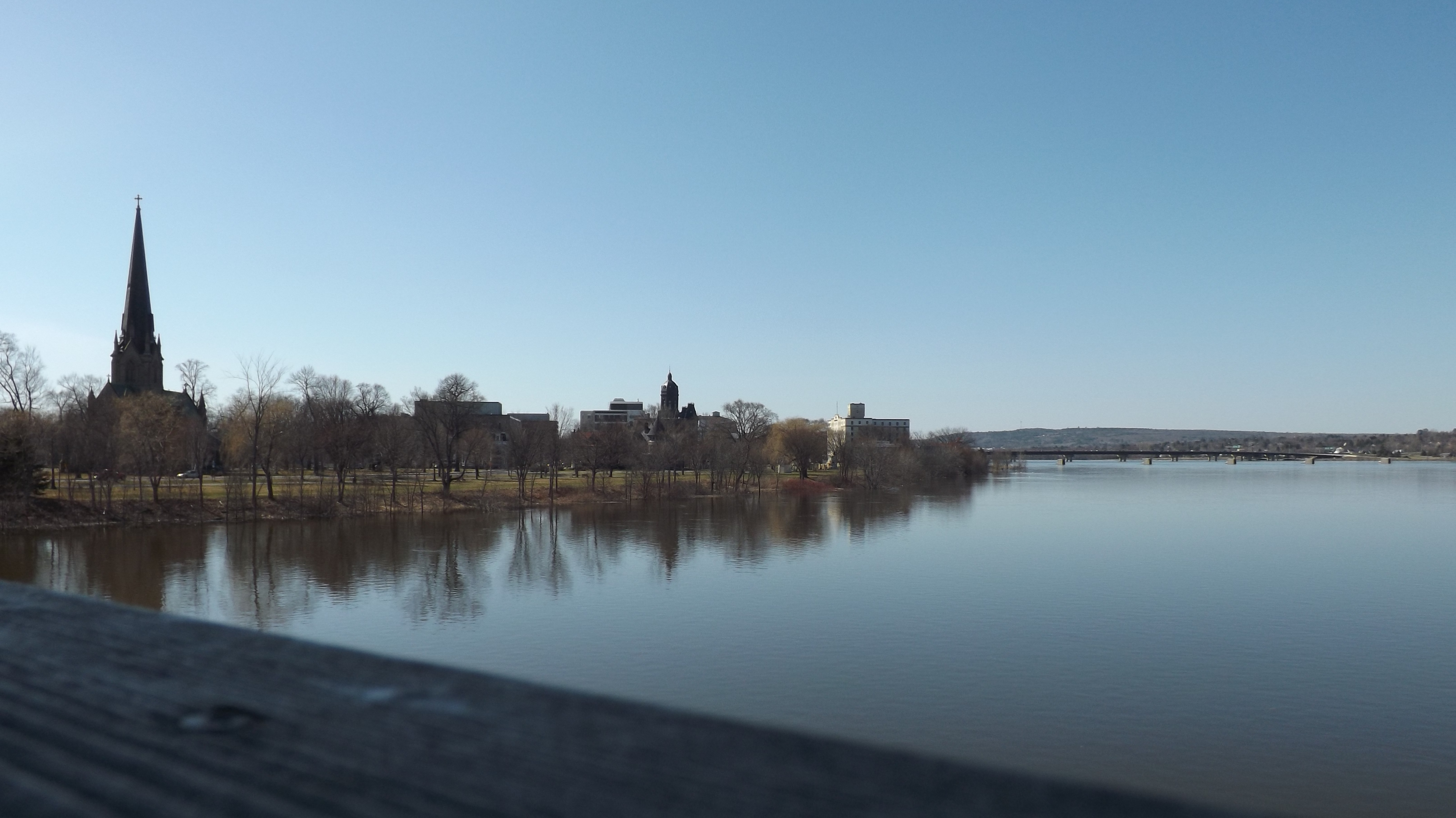
- Fredericton skyline
- Interactive map of Greater Fredericton
- Coordinates: 45°57′49″N 66°38′35″W
- Country: Canada
- Province: New Brunswick
- Principal city: Fredericton

Area (2016)
  - Total: 5,745.41 km^{2} (2,218.32 sq mi)

Population (2016)
  - CA: 101,760
  - CA density: 17.7/km^{2} (46/sq mi)
- Time zone: UTC−4 (AST)
  - Summer (DST): UTC−3 (ADT)

Greater Fredericton is the name given to the area encompassing the City of Fredericton in New Brunswick, Canada and its surroundings. Most of this area is along the Saint John River mainly on portions of Route 105, Route 102 and Route 101. Some of the areas mentioned below are included in the area of Greater Fredericton. It is also known as Fredericton Census Agglomeration, Fredericton CA, or The Capital Region. In 2006, the population of the census agglomeration (termed "Greater Fredericton") was 94,268

== List of towns, communities and cities ==
- Bright Parish
- Devon 30 Indian reserve
- Douglas Parish
- Fredericton
- Gladstone Parish
- Hanwell Village
- Harvey Village
- Kingsclear Parish
- Kingsclear 6 Indian reserve
- Lincoln Parish
- Maugerville Parish
- Manners Sutton Parish
- New Maryland Parish
- New Maryland Village
- Prince William Parish
- Queensbury Parish
- Saint Marys Parish
- Tracy Village
