= New Maryland =

New Maryland may refer to:

- New Maryland, New Brunswick, Canada
- New Maryland Parish, New Brunswick, Canada
- Hanwell-New Maryland, a provincial electoral district that elects members to the Legislative Assembly of New Brunswick, Canada
- New Maryland-Sunbury, a former provincial electoral district (1994-2023) that elected members to the Legislative Assembly of New Brunswick, Canada
