= New Brunswick Route 635 =

Highway in New Brunswick, Canada

Coordinates: 45.803076°N 67.145004°W

Route 635

Route information
- Maintained by New Brunswick Department of Transportation
- Length: 35 km (22 mi)

Major junctions
- East end: Route 102 in Lower Prince William
- Route 2 (TCH) in Lower Prince William
- West end: Route 3 in York Mills

Location
- Country: Canada
- Province: New Brunswick

Highway system
- Provincial highways in New Brunswick; Former routes
← Route 630	→ Route 636

Route 635 is a 35.2-kilometre (21.9 mi) long mostly north–south secondary highway in the southwestern portion of New Brunswick, Canada. Most of the route is in Prince William Parish.

The route starts at Route 102 near Kings Landing in Lower Prince William where it is known as Prince William Road. It travels west and crosses Route 2 at exit 253. From there, it travels through a sparsely populated area past Lake George, Donnelly Settlement, and Lake George. It intersects with the northern terminus of Route 636 before continuing through Magundy, Blaney Ridge, Magaguadavic and Prince William Station. It passes Lake Magaguadavic and Upper Mills before ending in York Mills at Route 3.

== See also ==
- List of highways numbered 635
