= New Brunswick Route 636 =

Highway in New Brunswick, Canada

Coordinates: 45.781412°N 67.032051°W

Route 636

Route information
- Maintained by New Brunswick Department of Transportation
- Length: 13 km (8.1 mi)

Major junctions
- North end: Route 635 in Lake George
- South end: Route 3 in Harvey Station

Location
- Country: Canada
- Province: New Brunswick

Highway system
- Provincial highways in New Brunswick; Former routes
← Route 635	→ Route 640

Route 636 is a 12.9-kilometre (8.0 mi) long mostly north–south secondary highway in the southwestern portion of New Brunswick, Canada. Most of the route is in Prince William Parish.

The route starts at Route 635 in Lake George where it travels south past Lake George. From there, it travels through a sparsely populated area past Lake Harvey before ending in Harvey Station at Route 3.

== See also ==
- List of highways numbered 636
