= Eunice D. Kinney =

American physician (1851–1942)

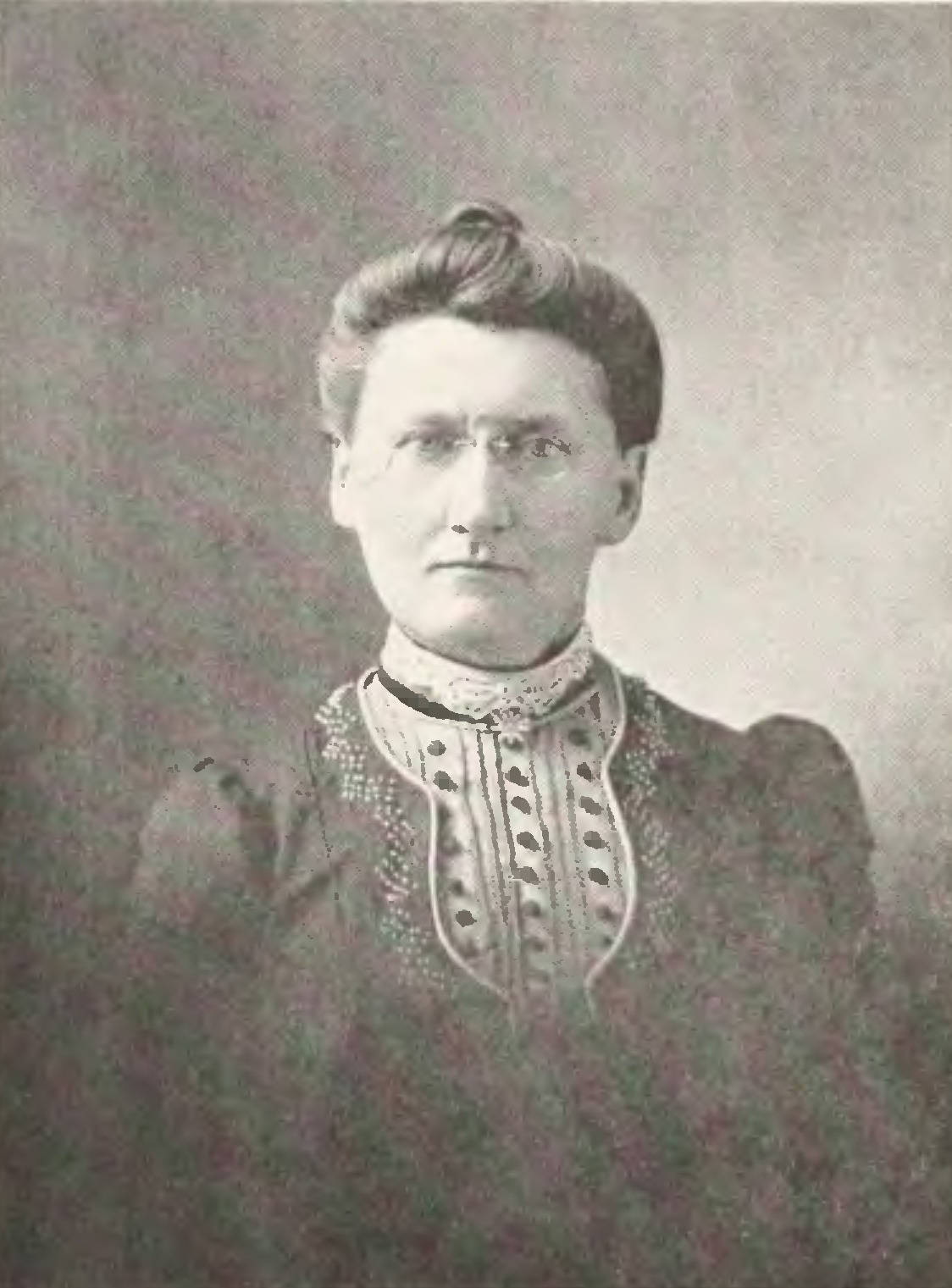
- Born: Eunice Draper; September 29, 1851; Southampton, New Brunswick, Canada
- Died: June 28, 1942 (aged 90); Bell, California, U.S.
- Education: Tufts College Medical School
- Occupation: physician
- Known for: First woman physician to testify as an expert before the U.S. circuit court
- Spouses: John Gartley (m. 1871; died 1874); John Mozart Kinney (m. 1884; died 1897)
- Medical career
- Sub-specialties: hypertrophic arthritis; neuritis

Eunice D. Kinney (1851–1942; née, Draper; after first marriage, Gartley; after second marriage, Kinney) was a Canadian-born American physician who specialized in hypertrophic arthritis and neuritis. She was born and passed her early years in a log cabin in New Brunswick. Her educational opportunities were so limited that up to the age of 21, she had attended school for only two and half years. Kinney graduated from the Boston Training School for Nurses (now, Massachusetts General Hospital School of Nursing) in 1881, obtained her medical degree from the College of Physicians and Surgeons, Boston, in 1890, and her post-graduate degree from Tufts College Medical School in 1895. While working as a practicing physician, she engaged to some extent in literary work, editing several nursing and medical journals, and serving as a press correspondent. Kinney was the first woman physician to testify as an expert before the U.S. circuit court.

== Early life ==
Eunice Draper was born in Southampton, New Brunswick, September 29, 1851. Her parents were James (1819–1877) and Catherine (Schriver) Draper (1827–1866).

She was a great-granddaughter of Isaac Draper, an Englishman who settled in Ireland in the first half of the 18th century, engaging in manufacturing industries. He owned several linen factories and more than 50 houses, but was completely ruined by the invention of the spinning jenny in 1767.

His son, James Draper Sr. (1781–1866), married Eliza Homan (d. 1872), whose paternal ancestry dated from the time of William the Conqueror. James Draper Sr., after losing all his property owing to the rapid change in industrial conditions, emigrated to New Brunswick. Here for some years, his wife supported the family by keeping a private school.

James Draper Jr., son of James Sr., and Eliza Draper, and father of Dr. Kinney, learned the baker's trade, which he abandoned at the age of 21 to become a pioneer farmer and lumberman. He was inventive, and exhibited at the 1876 Centennial Exposition at Philadelphia a vessel that he constructed. The house in which he died, at Brooke Station, Stafford County, Virginia October 28, 1877, is said to have been the one in which E. D. E. N. Southworth wrote The Hidden Hand.

His wife, Catherine Schriver (d. 1866), was partly of Dutch ancestry, her paternal grandparents coming to America from Amsterdam, Holland. Her mother was Eunice Hillman, a daughter of Tristram and Angel (Lindup) Hillman, English immigrants in New Brunswick, who resided at Southampton and at Canterbury, New Brunswick. The grandfather, Tristram Hillman, was a sea captain.

== Education and marriages ==
Eunice Draper was born and passed her early years in a log cabin. Her educational opportunities were so limited that up to the age of 21, she had attended school for only two and half years.

On August 31, 1871, in New Brunswick, she married John Gartley, of Magaguadavic, New Brunswick, who died June 16, 1874, leaving no property. In alluding to her subsequent experiences, Kinney stated:—

"After the death of my first husband, my first start in life began at the time I picked a two-gallon pail of wild strawberries, which I carried 7 miles (11 km) to the railroad station and sold for US$1. With that sum, I boarded the train for Bangor, Maine, having no idea of the cost of traveling. When I told the conductor my destination, he demanded more fare; but I stated that my brother was in the employ of the road, and when I gave his name he knew him, and allowed me to pass to that city, where I obtained employment as a general housework servant. As I was childless and so very young, I was advised by my employers to resume my maiden name, which advice I followed and found decidedly to my advantage in after years. I then began to realize by comparison with others how very ignorant I was, and, being resolved not to continue so, I devoted all my spare moments to study, until, much to my surprise, I found myself regarded as a woman of education. My medical education came about through force of circumstances, and not from any premeditation on my part."

Coming to Boston to prepare herself, Draper entered the Boston Training School for Nurses at Massachusetts General Hospital, graduating June 8, 1881. For some years, she followed that profession in Boston.

On August 6, 1884, in Boston, she married the Hon. John Mozart Kinney (1826–1897), who had been elected three times to the Massachusetts House of Representatives and twice to the State Senate. Later, he lost his property through financial reverses. Dr. Kinney had completed her hospital service and was in college at the time of her second marriage, but continued her studies, which did not at first meet with the approval of Mr. Kinney. She obtained her medical degree April 16, 1890, from the College of Physicians and Surgeons, Boston.

== Career ==
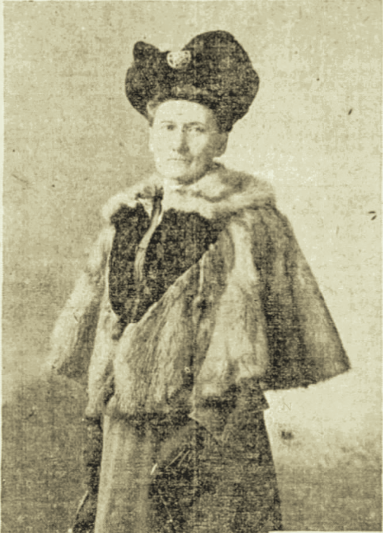
(1903)

Kinney established a self-supporting practice in Revere, Massachusetts. At the same time, she engaged to some extent in literary work. She was a press correspondent of the Woman's Relief Corps, editor of a journal, The Nurse (1892-93/95), and on the editorial staff of the Medical Times, and Register, a progressive medical publication with influence and international circulation.

In June, 1895, she was graduated from Tufts College Medical School, which she had entered for a post-graduate course.

Kinney served as a medical examiner for the United Order of the Golden Cross temperance organization), and several other fraternal orders. She held the offices of vice-president and superintendent of narcotics in the Woman's Christian Temperance Union at Revere. She was a member of the Count Rumford Historical Society, the Mycological Club of Boston, and the New England Woman's Press Association, as well as three alumni associations: Tufts College Medical Alumni Association, College of Physicians and Surgeons Alumni Association, and Massachusetts General Hospital's Training School for Nurses.

Kinney was a scientific observer of atmospheric phenomena preceding seismic disturbances and correctly predicted 21 earthquakes from one to three days in advance.

In religion, Kinney was Episcopalian. She was one of the founders of St. Anne's Episcopal Mission in Revere, and an active worker among the poor.

== Personal life ==
In August 1894, Kinney was confined to the Massachusetts General Hospital for more than three weeks after a critical operation. At the time, her place of residence was Hotel Pelham, Boston. In September 1919, while making a temporary home in Zaferia, Long Beach, California, Kinney was injured on The Pike by falling over a rope, wrenching her shoulder and wrists, and bruising her face. In 1925, after a nervous breakdown, Kinney removed permanently to Long Beach, where she fully recovered.

In 1940, Kinney became a patient in a Bell, California sanitarium where she died on June 28, 1942.
