= Northampton Parish, New Brunswick =

Northampton
- Parish
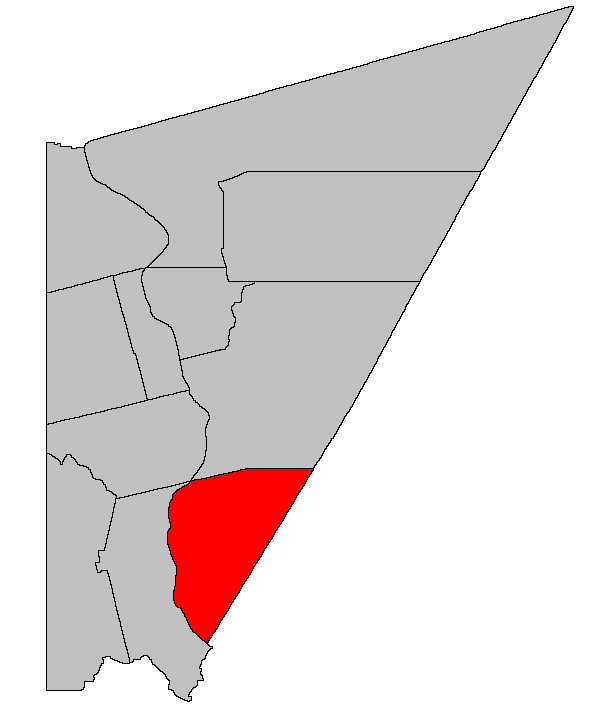
- Location within Carleton County, New Brunswick
- Coordinates: 46.08°N 67.55°W
- Country: Canada
- Province: New Brunswick
- County: Carleton
- Erected: 1786

Area
  - Land: 243.31 km^{2} (93.94 sq mi)

Population (2021)
  - Total: 1,875
  - Density: 7.7/km^{2} (20/sq mi)
  - Change 2016-2021: ▲8.8%
  - Dwellings: 766
- Time zone: UTC-4 (AST)
  - Summer (DST): UTC-3 (ADT)

Northampton is a geographic parish in Carleton County, New Brunswick, Canada, sitting across the Saint John River from Woodstock.

Prior to the 2023 governance reform, for governance purposes it comprised two local service districts, both of which were members of the Western Valley Regional Service Commission (WVRSC).

The Census subdivision of Northampton Parish shares the geographic parish's borders.

== Origin of name ==
The parish's name may have come from it being on what was then the northern edge of York County.

== History ==
Northampton was erected in 1786 as one of York County's original parishes. It originally included most of Southampton Parish and modern Northampton Parish.

== Boundaries ==
Northampton Parish is roughly triangular in shape, bounded:

- on the west by the Saint John River;
- on the southeast by York County;
- on the north by a line beginning north of Shaws Creek and running southeast nearly to the southern line of the grant that includes the mouth of Shaws Creek, easterly to the boundary of the Becaguimec Game Management Area, then due east to the county line.

=== Evolution of boundaries ===
The original land boundaries of Northampton were the current eastern shoreline boundary of Southampton Parish extended inland for 12 miles (19 km), then by a line running from thence north-westerly to the mouth of a river which discharges into the river Saint John, at the upper boundary of block number seven, about two miles and a quarter above the upper end of Pine Island, (Note: Usage of long s modernised for readability.) producing a shallower but much wider parish that included Southampton Parish. The wording of the northeastern boundary proved problematic, describing an endpoint in a stretch of shoreline with no waterway large enough to be named on modern provincial maps. If the Pine Island named is actually the next island downriver of modern Pine Island (Sharps Island, formerly Indian Island) then Shaws Creek is in the right place to be the river where the northeastern line ended.

In 1832 Carleton County was separated from York County. The county line ran through Northampton to the east of the modern line, with more of the parish on the York side than the Carleton side.

In 1833 the York County portion of Northampton was erected as Southampton Parish.

In 1834 the county line was moved west about 600 metres to run along grant lines at the shore, transferring a strip of territory to Southampton.

In 1841 the vagueness of the northern boundary had caused sufficient difficulty with property assessments that the boundary with Brighton Parish was set as a line running due east from Shaws Creek. This transferred the northeastern part of modern Northampton from Brighton.

In 1862 the boundary with Brighton Parish was moved north from the mouth of Shaws Creek to its current course. Wording changes in 1896 and 1952 clarified the boundary but did not alter it.

== Local service districts ==
Both LSDs assessed for community & recreation services and the basic LSD services of fire protection, police services, land use planning, emergency measures, and dog control.

=== Northampton Parish ===
The local service district of the parish of Northampton originally comprised the entire parish; it now includes only the northern river grants and the interior of the parish.

The parish LSD was established in 1966 to assess for fire protection after the abolition of county government under the new Municipalities Act. Community services were added in 1967 and recreational and sports facilities in 2011.

The taxing authority was 210.00 Northampton.

LSD advisory committee: Yes. Chair Graham Gill sat on the board of the WVRSC in 2020.

=== Upper and Lower Northampton ===
Upper and Lower Northampton comprised the Saint John River grants from the southern intersection of Route 105 and Parker Road.

The LSD was established in 1987 to add first aid & ambulance services and recreational facilities.

The taxing authority was 231.00 Upper & Lower Northampton.

LSD advisory committee: Yes. Chair Ed Stone sat on the WVRSC board from at least 2015. Stone was listed as the Chair of Northampton in 2015 and 2016 and as an alternate LSD board member in 2017 and 2018.

== Communities ==
Communities at least partly within the parish.

- Carr
- East Newbridge
- Grafton
- Grafton Hill
- Harten Corner
- Kilmarnock
- Lower Northampton
- Newbridge
- Newburg
- Newburg Junction
- Northampton
- Pembroke
- Upper Northampton

== Bodies of water ==
Bodies of water (Note: Not including brooks, ponds or coves.) at least partly within the parish.

- Saint John River
- Nackawic Stream
- Gibson Creek
- Phillips Creek
- Shaws Creek
- Ayers Lake

== Islands ==
Islands at least partly within the parish.

- Riordan Islets

== Other notable places ==
Parks, historic sites, and other noteworthy places at least partly within the parish.

- Angle Hill Lake Protected Natural Area
- Becaguimec Wildlife Management Area
- Woodstock Aerodrome

== Demographics ==
=== Population ===
Population trend

Census	Population	Change (%)
2016	1,724	▼5.5%
2011	1,825	▲14.1%
2006	1,599	▼6.4%
2001	1,708	▲16.7%
1996	1,464	▲10.1%
1991	1,330	N/A

=== Language ===
Mother tongue (2016)

Language	Population	Pct (%)
English only	1579	91.6%
French only	35	2.0%
Other languages	100	5.8%
Both English and French	10	0.6%

== See also ==
- List of parishes in New Brunswick
