= Hanwell (disambiguation) =

Hanwell is a suburb of London, England.

Hanwell may also refer to:

- Hanwell, New Brunswick, Canada
- Hanwell, Oxfordshire, England
