= Bates Settlement, New Brunswick =

Coordinates: 46.008°N 67.321°W

Location of Bates Settlement in New Brunswick

Bates Settlement is a former settlement in New Brunswick.

It was located 2.26 km NE of Hartfield and 2.26 km SE of Campbell Settlement.

Currently, the road to the settlement serves as a logging road.

== History ==
It was first named Oldham Settlement for Joseph Oldham, one of the first settlers in the area. It was later renamed Bates Settlement for settlers John and Lewis Bates.

== See also ==
- List of communities in New Brunswick
