= Napadogan =

Coordinates: 46.400°N 66.917°W

Napadogan is a community in the Canadian province of New Brunswick.

== Mining ==
Northcliff Resources Ltd. and the Sissom Partnership have proposed to build a tungsten and molybdenum mine, the Sisson Mine, near Napadogan. Some members of the Wolastoqiyik First Nations and other residents are protesting against the potential environmental hazards represented by the mine.

== History ==
At its peak Napadogan was a very active community. The CN railroad operated a large facility. There were 15 side rails, a roundhouse, turntable, sand tower, water tower, coal storage and control tower. There was maintenance for the box cars and engines. This was during the 30s, 40s, and 50s. During its peak there were a lot of wartime effort supplies transported through these lines. It is said on a good day in the control tower you could catch the horse races in England on the radio. CN owned six houses in town to put up staff. It would not have been uncommon to have 300 crew just to deal with the tracks, clearing snow and repairing tracks.

At the CN yard they kept several engines on cold standby in case of a breakdown. CN also had jail cells in the event that they captured any German spies during the war. Hobos were common through this area as they were riding the rails. My Boyce's son William recalls two German hobos that were riding the rails as hobos and came into the store begging for bread and jam. One of them had been shot by machine gun and could barely walk, his friend had saved him.

During the war everything was shipped through Napadogan on its way to Halifax. Tanks and aircraft out of the US. Every rail town in New Brunswick was in fear of being bombed or German spies coming in to attack them due to the resources they were shipping to England.

Most of the homes and businesses during the war had black-out curtains as there was a fear of bombing.

The lake in Napadogan is great for fishing.

There were two grocery stores in town, Howard Elgee owned one and later on Hubert Boyce owned the second one. The second one that Mr. Boyce operated was originally operated by his father and then sold before Hubert purchased it back. Hurbert operated the grocery store, owned the CN restaurant, and had the post office.

Today Napadogan is all but a ghost town but there are talks of tungsten mining operations starting up.

CN operated a raillink between Edmunston and Halifax with occasional stops in Moncton.

== See also ==
- List of communities in New Brunswick
