= Lake George, New Brunswick =

Community in New Brunswick, Canada

Lake George
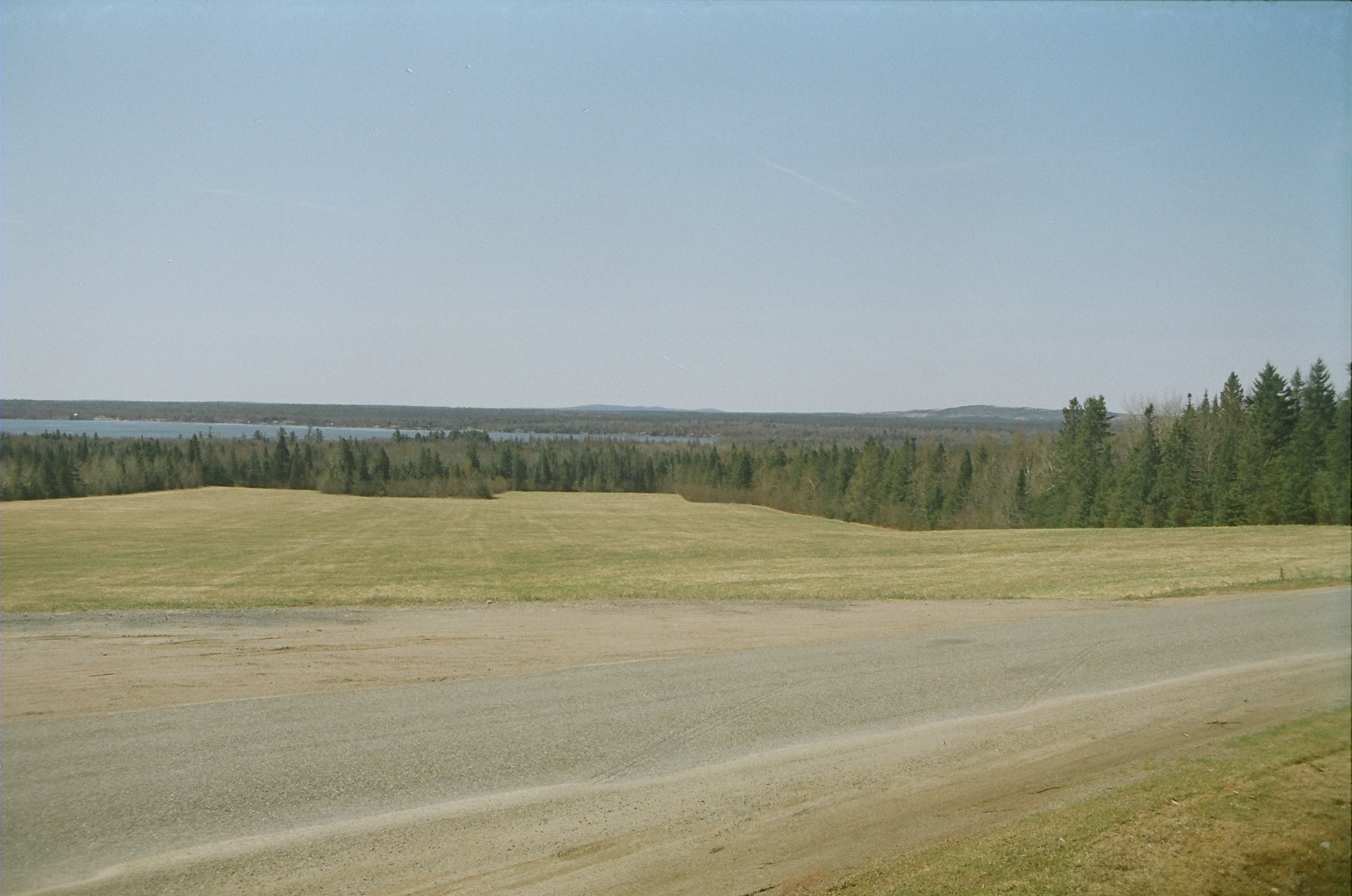

- Location within New Brunswick
- Location: New Brunswick, Canada
- Coordinates: 45.8302°N 67.0797°W
- Basin countries: Canada
- Surface area: 6 km^{2} (2.3 sq mi)
- Max. depth: 7 m (23 ft)

Lake George is a Canadian rural community in York County, New Brunswick at the intersection of Route 635 and the northern terminus of Route 636. The community is located 45 kilometres (km) west of the city of Fredericton, and is named after Lake George.

Although Lake George has some year-round residents who live and work in the community or the nearby village of Harvey Station, its population increases substantially during the summer months when seasonal cottages are occupied.

== Climate ==
The average temperature is 4°C. The warmest month is July, at 18°C, and the coldest is January, at −13°C.

The average rainfall is 1,618 mm per year. The wettest month is July, at 182 mm of rain, and the driest is January, at 85 mm.

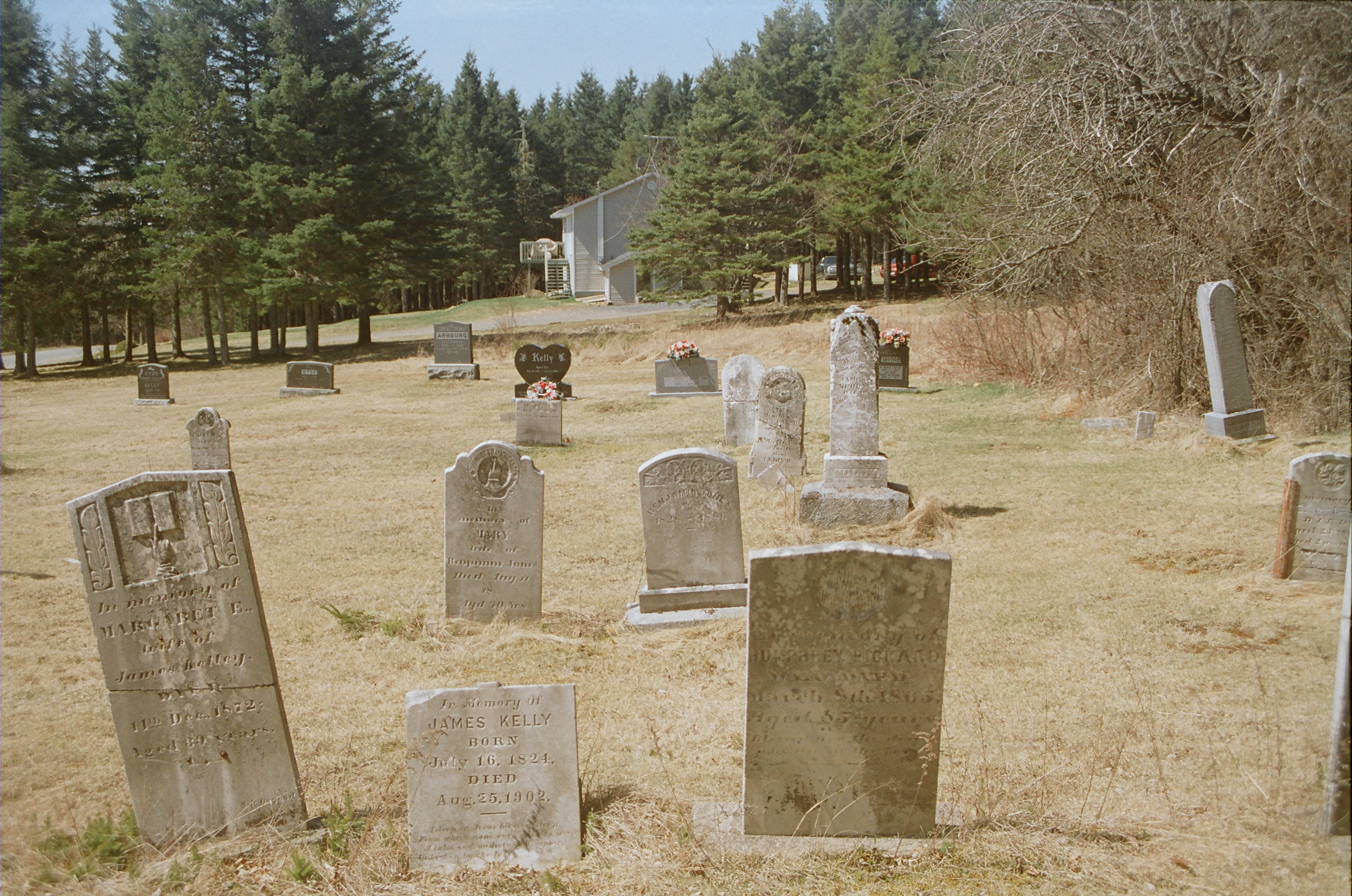
Cemetery at Lake George

== See also ==
- List of communities in New Brunswick
