= Camp Harmony, New Brunswick =

Camp Harmony
- Unincorporated community
- Location of Camp Harmony, New Brunswick
- Coordinates: 47.883333°N 66.95°W
- Country: Canada
- Province: New Brunswick
- County: Restigouche
- Parish: Eldon
- Electoral Districts Federal: Madawaska—Restigouche
- Provincial: Campbellton-Restigouche Centre

Government
  - Type: Local service district
- Time zone: UTC-4 (AST)
  - Summer (DST): UTC-3 (ADT)
- Area code: 506
- Access Routes: Wyers Road via Route 17

Camp Harmony is an unincorporated community in Restigouche County, New Brunswick, Canada.

== History ==
The community was originally a fishing club for American millionaires.

== See also ==
- List of communities in New Brunswick
