= Moulin-Morneault, New Brunswick =

Human settlement in New Brunswick, Canada

Coordinates: 47.449°N 68.362°W

Location of Moulin-Morneault in New Brunswick

Moulin-Morneault is a settlement in New Brunswick.

== See also ==
- List of communities in New Brunswick
