= Basse-Aboujagane, New Brunswick =

Community in New Brunswick, Canada

Coordinates: 46.141833°N 64.418389°W

Location of Aboujagane in New Brunswick

Basse-Aboujagane is a Canadian community, located in Westmorland County, New Brunswick, part of the incorporated rural community of Beaubassin East. The community is situated in southeastern New Brunswick, to the East of Moncton. Basse-Aboujagane is located mainly on Route 933.

== History ==
Basse-Aboujagane was first settled about 1810 by Acadians from Memramcook and Fox Creek. In 1871 "Bougogen" had a population of 100. By 1898, Basse-Aboujagane was a farming and fishing settlement with 1 post office, 2 lobster factories and a population of 200 people.

== See also ==
- List of communities in New Brunswick

== Bordering communities ==
- Cormier Village, New Brunswick
- Bourgeois Village, New Brunswick
- Drisdelle, New Brunswick
