= Grafton, New Brunswick =

Human settlement in New Brunswick, Canada

Coordinates: 46.147611°N 67.563333°W

Location of Grafton in New Brunswick

Grafton is a community just outside Woodstock in the Canadian province of New Brunswick. It is situated in Northampton, a parish of Carleton County.

The Woodstock Airport is located here.

== History ==
In July 1888, the entire village burned to the ground, leaving 200 people homeless. The local school was swiftly rebuilt before the beginning of 1889.

== See also ==
- List of communities in New Brunswick
