= Beaver Dam, New Brunswick =

Human settlement in Canada

Coordinates: 45.498°N 66.698°W

Location of BeaverDam in New Brunswick

BeaverDam is a settlement in York County, New Brunswick. New Brunswick Route 101 runs through BeaverDam.

== Population ==
Currently, BeaverDam is a parish of New Maryland, New Brunswick, and the population consists of 2,805 people.

== History ==
BeaverDam was settled in 1830 on the South Branch of the Rusagonis Stream. The site was established as a farming community in 1866, with a population of 100; this community included six different families. One notable family was the O'leary's who settled in the mid 1800's with descendants still living there today. The first post office was put up in 1898 as well.

St. John the Evangelist Anglican Church, BeaverDam was originally built in 1840 in New Maryland, New Brunswick, was later moved to Rusagonis, New Brunswick, and then to its final resting place of BeaverDam, New Brunswick where it was later taken down on April 5, 2015.

== See also ==
- List of communities in New Brunswick
