= Miramichi Bay, New Brunswick =

Coordinates: 47.160°N 65.198°W

Location of Miramichi Bay in New Brunswick

Miramichi Bay is a settlement in Northumberland County, New Brunswick.

Miramichi Bay and River Origin unknown; possibly from the Montagnais Maissimeau Assi, "the land of the Micmacs". Ganong suggests that it may well be a "greatly altered European form", since the word Micmac itself is of possible French origin. Miramichy applied to the river by Nicolas Denys in 1672.

== See also ==
- List of communities in New Brunswick
