= Rooth, New Brunswick =

- Interactive map of Rooth, New Brunswick
- Coordinates: 45.688828°N 66.836738°W
- Country: Canada
- Province: New Brunswick
- County: York
- Parish: New Maryland Parish
- Time zone: Atlantic time

Rooth is an unincorporated community and railway point in the Canadian province of New Brunswick in York County, 7.77 kilometres (4.83 miles) east of Cork Station.

== Transportation ==
New Brunswick Route 645 and the New Brunswick Southern Railway both pass through Rooth. A post office named Rooth Station operated from 1911 to 1966, and a post office named Rooth operated from 1963 to 1966.
