= Scotch Lake, New Brunswick =

Coordinates: 45.9574°N 66.9688°W

Location of Scotch Lake in New Brunswick

Scotch Lake is a small community in York County, New Brunswick, Canada. It was founded by six families from Roxburghshire and Dumfriesshire in 1820. It has a population of around 300.

Scotch Lake has many homes and cottages, and has provincial park trails under the care of Mactaquac Provincial Park. Local wildlife includes white tailed deer, black bears, wild hare and beaver, and its woods are home to a large variety of birds. Its wide swaths of thick forest attract fishermen and hunters.

== See also ==
- List of communities in New Brunswick
