= Northampton, New Brunswick =

Coordinates: 46°19′N 67°28′W

Northampton is a community in Carleton County, New Brunswick, Canada.

== History ==
Located on the eastern shore of the Saint John River, 10 km SSE of Woodstock, Northampton is a rural community lying along Route 105: Northampton Parish, Carleton County: PO 1853-1914: in 1866 Northampton was a farming community with about 68 resident families: in 1871 it had a population of 250: in 1898 Northampton had 1 post office, 1 sawmill, 1 church and a population of 200: included the community of Ferryville, which was named for the ferry operated by Aaron Putnam in 1809: PO Ferryville 1865-1910: in 1898 Ferryville was a settlement with 1 post office, 1 church and a population of 150.

== Notable people ==
- Charles Connell - Politician

== See also ==
- List of communities in New Brunswick
