= Hawkshaw, New Brunswick =

Coordinates: 45.9655°N 67.237361°W

Location of Hawkshaw in New Brunswick

Hawkshaw is a community in the Canadian province of New Brunswick located on the Saint John River. It is situated in Dumfries, a parish of York County. Much of this community was submerged by water when the Mactaquac Dam was built in 1967. Prior to construction, many of the buildings were moved and others were burned. The rural community of Nackawic-Millville was built nearby to house the displaced residents.

== See also ==
- List of communities in New Brunswick
- The Town That Drowned
