= Bull Lake, New Brunswick =

Coordinates: 46.105°N 67.383°W

Bull Lake is a settlement in York County, New Brunswick on Route 595.

== History ==
Bull Lake has also been known as Green Lake and had a post office branch there in the years 1903 to 1912. The settlement is named after a nearby lake also called Bull Lake. There is one small family cemetery.

Bulmer Field is located to the north.

== See also ==
- List of communities in New Brunswick
