= Nasonworth, New Brunswick =

Coordinates: 45.83923°N 66.67967°W

Nasonworth is a community in the Canadian province of New Brunswick, 5.5 kilometres (3.4 mi) south of New Maryland; the name was also used for a special service area within the local service district of the parish of New Maryland.

== See also ==
- List of communities in New Brunswick
