= Millville, New Brunswick =

Millville
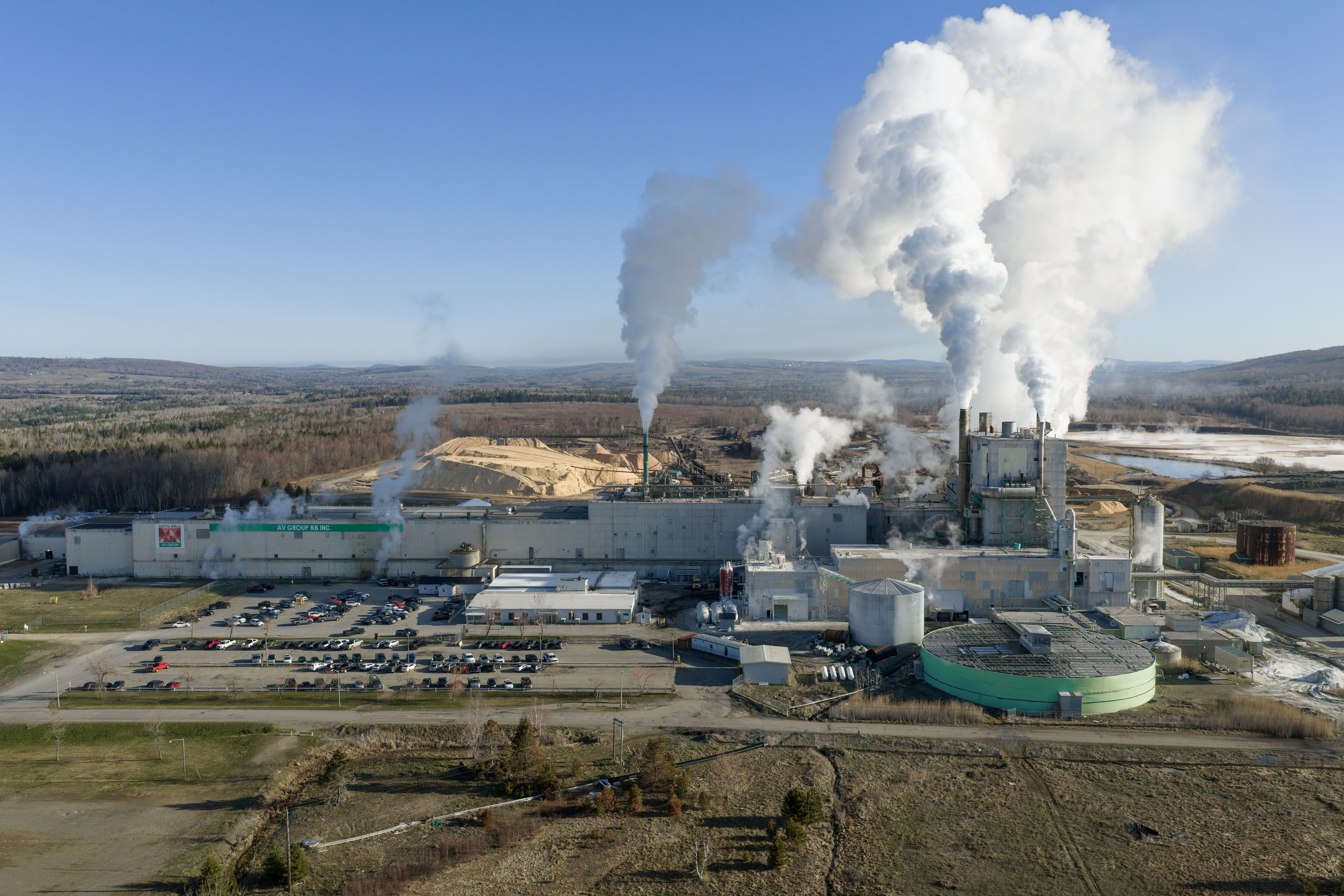
- AV Nackawic pulp mill in Millville

- Location of Millville within New Brunswick.
- Coordinates: 46°13′23″N 67°19′27″W
- Country: Canada
- Province: New Brunswick
- County: York County
- Parish: Southampton Parish
- Municipality: Nackawic-Millville
- Incorporated: 1966

Area
  - Land: 12.14 km^{2} (4.69 sq mi)

Population (2021)
  - Total: 274
  - Density: 22.6/km^{2} (59/sq mi)
  - Change (2016–21): ▲0.4%
- Time zone: UTC−4 (Atlantic (AST))
  - Summer (DST): UTC−3 (Atlantic Daylight Time (ADT))
- Canadian Postal code: E6E
- Area code: 506
- Website: villageofmillville.com

Millville is a former village in York County, New Brunswick, Canada. It held village status prior to 2023 and is now part of the rural community of Nackawic-Millville. It is at the intersection of Route 104 and Route 605.

Situated on the Nackawic River approximately 58.16 kilometers northwest of Fredericton, Millville has several churches and post office. The village is famous for having the World's Largest Artificial Maple Leaf.

The community is served by the Millville Fire Department, consisting of approximately 18 volunteer firefighters.

== History ==
Millville was established about 1860 as a New Brunswick and Nova Scotia Land Company settlement. A post office was established in 1866. In 1898, Millville was a station on the Canadian Pacific Railway. It was incorporated as a village in 1966.

On 1 January 2023, Millville amalgamated with the town of Nackawic and parts of four local service districts to form the new incorporated rural community of Nackawic-Millville. The community's name remains in official use.

== Demographics ==
In the 2021 Census of Population conducted by Statistics Canada, Millville had a population of 274 living in 135 of its 145 total private dwellings, a change of 0.4% from its 2016 population of 273. With a land area of 12.14 km^{2} (4.69 sq mi), it had a population density of 22.6/km^{2} (58.5/sq mi) in 2021.

Historical populations: Millville, NB
Year	Pop.	±%
2001	319	—
2006	303	−5.0%
2011	307	+1.3%
2016	273	−11.1%
2021	274	+0.4%

== Infrastructure ==
Millville is served by New Brunswick highway Route 104, as well as a converted rail trail, numbered 25 by Quad NB.

== See also ==
- List of communities in New Brunswick
- List of world's largest roadside attractions
