= Prince William, New Brunswick =

Settlement in New Brunswick, Canada

Coordinates: 45.905°N 67.031°W

Location of Prince William in New Brunswick

Prince William is a settlement in York County, New Brunswick.

== See also ==
- List of communities in New Brunswick
- Royal eponyms in Canada
