= Bull Lake (New Brunswick) =

Lake in York County, New Brunswick, Canada

- Green Lake
- Location of Bull Lake in New Brunswick
- Location: York County, New Brunswick
- Coordinates: 46.112°N 67.391°W
- Lake type: Mesotrophic?
- Primary inflows: two streams
- Primary outflows: Negro Brook
- Basin countries: Canada
- Max. length: 827 m (2,713 ft)
- Surface elevation: 437 m (1,434 ft)
- Settlements: Bull Lake

Bull Lake is a lake in York County, New Brunswick.

== Description ==
The lake is marshy and is reputed to have a quicksand bottom.
