= Sisson Mine =

Proposed mine in Stanley, New Brunswick, Canada

- Location within New Brunswick
- Location: New Brunswick, Canada; 46°22′18″N 67°2′54″W
- Products: Tungsten, Molybdenum
- Active: Proposed
- Company: Northcliff Resources Ltd. (88.5%), Todd Minerals Ltd. (11.5%)

Sisson Mine is a proposed open-pit tungsten and molybdenum mine which would be sited near the town of Stanley, 60 km North-West of Fredericton, New Brunswick, Canada. The project is being developed by Northcliff Resources Ltd., which holds an 88.5% controlling interest, with the remaining 11.5% owned by Todd Minerals Ltd., a subsidiary of the Todd Corporation of New Zealand. The mine would be among the world's largest tungsten mines, with reserves equating to 227 kilotonnes of elemental tungsten (W). The claim owner, Sisson Mines Ltd., proposes to mine 30,000 tonnes per day of ore which contains on average 0.06 per cent tungsten trioxide (WO_{3}) and smaller amounts of molybdenum. The tungsten component of the ore would be refined into an intermediate product ammonium paratungstate (APT) for shipment. Five hundred fifty seven thousand metric ton units (mtu) of APT would be produced per year, which equates to 4,457 tonnes of tungsten metal per year.

The mine would generate large quantities of potentially acid-generating tailings. To minimise acid production and leaching of toxins, including arsenic, from the tailings and waste rock the operator proposes to submerge the tailings and waste rock in a large tailings storage facility (TSF - or "tailings pond"). The pond would be about 3½ by 2½ km in horizontal extent, with a maximum dam height of 90 metres; the stored volume would comprise 23 million cubic metres of contaminated water, 282 million tonnes of tailings, and 193 million tonnes of waste rock.

There is local concern about the environmental impact of the mine and tailings storage facility.

According to a 2002 paper by T E Martin and others in Minerals, Mining, and Sustainable Development, “Tailings storage facilities typically represent the most significant environmental liability associated with mining operations.”

The mine would be closed after a two year construction period and 27 year producing life. The operator says that after closure, the open pit, which will be 2 km^{2} in area and 300–330 metres deep, will be allowed to fill with rain water. Because the sides of the flooded pit will be steep and rocky, and thus hazardous, the operator proposes that: "The open pit and quarry will however be fenced, supplemented with earth/rock berms if deemed necessary, to prevent human and wildlife access."

The tailings storage facility will not be drained or filled after closure but will remain as open water. The tailings storage facility must be essentially permanent, as the submerged tailings will remain chemically hazardous for about 10,000 years. Tailings dams have a history of failure in Canada as well as around the world. The rate of tailings dam failure worldwide is between 1/700 and 1/1500 per dam per year. After the 2014 catastrophic failure of the Mount Polley tailings dam in the province of British Columbia, Canada, the government-appointed Expert Panel which reviewed the incident found that since 1969, of the province's approximately 100 tailings dams, 7 had experienced major failure. The rate of major failure was 1.7 × 10^{−3} per dam per year.

In its Environmental Impact Assessment (EIA) statement to the New Brunswick and Canadian governments, Sisson Mines Ltd. dismissed the possibility of a tailings dam failure and made no risk assessment of it.

"the possibility of a structural failure of a TSF embankment is so unlikely that it cannot reasonably be considered a credible accident or malfunction, and is thus not considered further in this EIA Report." (Sisson EIA, p. 8-698, cited in CCNB 2013, p 84/230)

Several experts asked to comment on Sisson's regulatory application found this omission unacceptable. Writing for the Centre for Science in Public Participation, Dr. David Chambers and Mr. Stu Levit, M.S., J.D. commented on the above statement as follows:

"This is the first time I have seen this glaringly overconfident statement made in an EIS/EIA.

"In the 10 years since the ICOLD 2001 report the failure rate of tailings dams has remained at roughly one failure every 8 months (i.e. three failures every two years). These dam failures are not limited to old technology or to countries with scant regulation. Previous research pointed out that most tailings dam failures occur at operating mines, and that 39% of the tailings dam failures worldwide occur in the United States, significantly more than in any other country.

"Tailings dam failure is a low probability event, but also an event with high consequences. These consequences have never been ignored in any other EIS/EIA I have reviewed. To in essence assert that 'my engineering' could not possibly fail, in light of existing statistics, is arrogantly assuming that it is always the other guy (or gal) that will make a mistake -- but not me. This is exactly the attitude that leads to accidents." (CCNB 2013, p 84/320.)

R Allen Curry, a professor of biology at the University of New Brunswick, commented as follows:

"I respect that the engineers can design a well-built dam that has a low probability of failure under normal operating conditions. However, the statistics on TSFs are indisputable – the proponent will fail to contain their water.... [A]ssuming a mine life of 27 years and the current empirical rate of 1 [failure sic.] in 2000 per dam year, the TSF dam at Sisson would have a 98.65% chance of surviving 27 years without a failure, or a 1 in 74 risk of at least one failure over 27 years....

"Given that the Mt. Pleasant TSF failure was due to a precipitation event and which are becoming more common in our region, that such understanding of failures was not incorporated into this analyses and planned for is totally unacceptable. " (CCNB 2013, p 73/230.)

(Mt. Pleasant was a tin and tungsten mine located 100 km south of Sisson; its tailings dam failed in 1998.)

At 0.06% WO_{3}, the grade of the ore at Sisson mine is low by industry standards, so the mine can only be operated profitably if costs are minimised and the tungsten price is high.

== Other works ==
- CCNB, 2013. Conservation Council of New Brunswick, Expert Comments on the Environmental Impact Assessment Report for the Sisson Project (230 pages.)
- David M Chambers, ca. 2011. "Long Term Risk of Releasing Potentially Acid Producing Waste Due to Tailings Dam Failure" . Accessed June 2018.

== See also ==
- Tailings dam failure
- International Commission on Large Dams (ICOLD)
