= Lake George (New Brunswick) =

Lake in New Brunswick, Canada

- Location within New Brunswick
- Location: York County, New Brunswick
- Coordinates: 45.815°N 67.046°W
- Basin countries: Canada
- Surface area: 691.5 ha (1,709 acres)
- Max. depth: 5.15 m (16.9 ft)
- Water volume: 0.0209 km^{3} (0.0050 cu mi)
- Shore length^{1}: 16.1 km (10.0 miles)
- Settlements: Lake George
- ^{1} Shore length is not a well-defined measure.

Lake George is a lake in York County, New Brunswick, Canada adjacent to the rural community of Lake George. The lake is approximately 40 km (25 mi) from the province's capital, Fredericton.

The lake itself is roughly circular and has an area of 691.5 ha (1,709 acres) with a maximum depth of 5.15 m (16.9 ft).

== See also ==
- List of lakes of New Brunswick
