= Clarkville, New Brunswick =

Coordinates: 46.121417°N 67.364333°W

Location of Clarkville in New Brunswick

Clarkville is a community in York County, New Brunswick, Canada, on Route 585.

== See also ==
- List of communities in New Brunswick
