= Pembroke, New Brunswick =

Coordinates: 46.1832°N 67.5338°W

Pembroke is a community in the Canadian province of New Brunswick.

== See also ==
- List of communities in New Brunswick
