= Southampton, New Brunswick =

Canadian rural community

Coordinates: 45°58′N 67°15′W

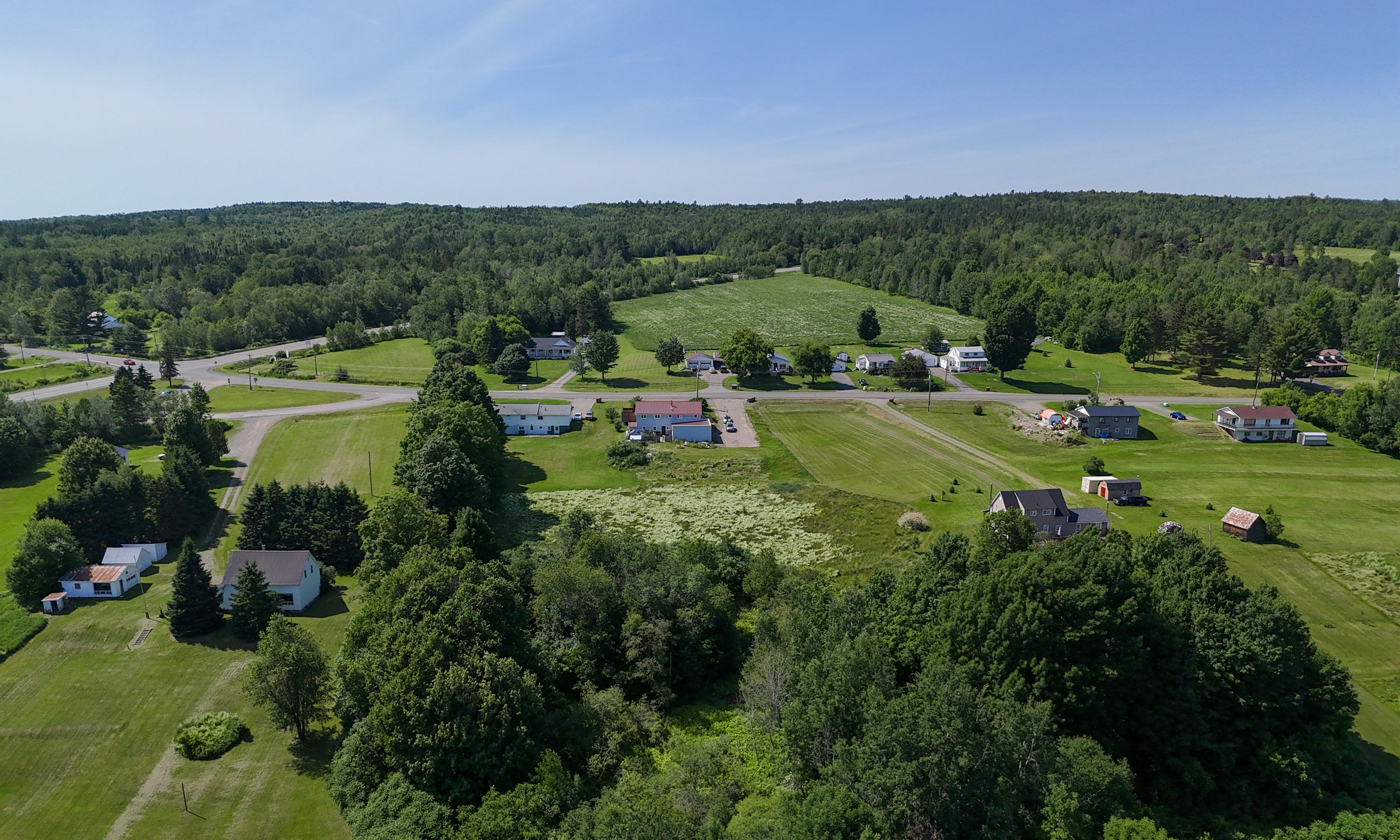
Community

Southampton is a Canadian rural community in York County, New Brunswick.

The community is located on the east side of the Saint John River, 3.71 km south of Southampton Junction, a station located within the village of Nackawic-Millville, created when the New Brunswick Railway was constructed in the 1870s.

== History ==
The community was founded in 1787, when land was granted to the Loyalist members of the Pennsylvania Loyalists Regiment.

A post office branch was established in 1853 and removed in 1914. In 1866, Southampton was a farming community with approximately 68 resident families. In 1871 Southampton and surrounding district had a population of 300. In 1898 Southampton had 1 post office, 3 stores, 2 churches and a population of 100.

== Notable people ==
- Eunice D. Kinney (1851–1942), physician

== See also ==
- List of communities in New Brunswick
