= Magundy, New Brunswick =

Coordinates: 45.823775°N 67.10741°W

Magundy is a community in the Canadian province of New Brunswick. It is located 23 miles (37 km) SW of Fredericton on Route 635.

== History ==
It was settled around 1820 from Ireland.

== See also ==
- List of communities in New Brunswick
