= New Maryland Parish, New Brunswick =

Parish in Canada

New Maryland
- Parish
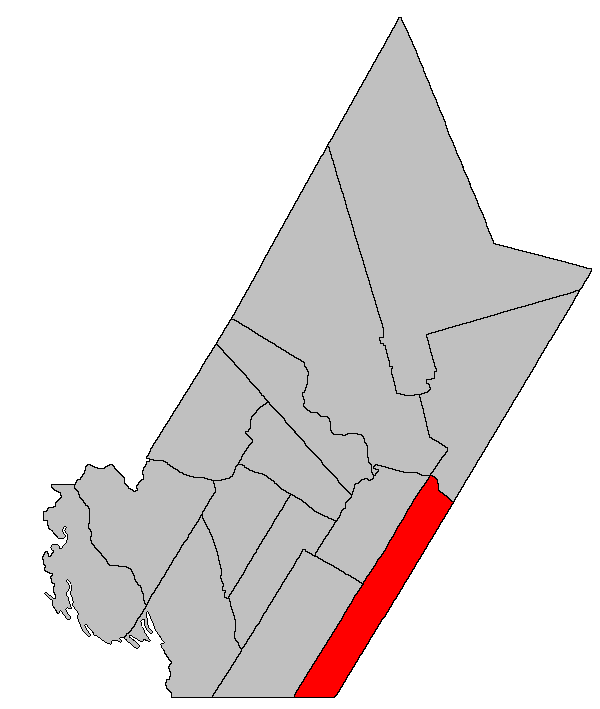
- Location within York County, New Brunswick. map incorrectly includes Fredericton in New Maryland
- Coordinates: 45.6925°N 66.8125°W
- Country: Canada
- Province: New Brunswick
- County: York
- Erected: 1850

Area
  - Land: 375.02 km^{2} (144.80 sq mi)

Population (2021)
  - Total: 2,806
  - Density: 7.5/km^{2} (19/sq mi)
  - Change 2016-2021: ▲7.7%
  - Dwellings: 1,057
- Time zone: UTC-4 (AST)
  - Summer (DST): UTC-3 (ADT)
- Figures do not include portion within the village of New Maryland

New Maryland is a geographic parish in York County, New Brunswick, Canada.

Prior to the 2023 governance reform, for governance purposes it was divided between the village of New Maryland the local service district of the parish of New Maryland, both of which were members of Capital Region Service Commission (RSC11). The LSD further includes the special service areas of Howorth and Nasonworth.

== Origin of name ==
The parish probably came from members of the Maryland Loyalists Battalion who settled in the area. Ganong states that the name came from the settlement of Maryland.

== History ==
New Maryland was erected in 1850 from Kingsclear Parish and unassigned territory.

== Boundaries ==
New Maryland Parish is bounded:

- on the northeast by the city of Fredericton;
- on the southeast by the Sunbury County line;
- on the south by the Charlotte County line;
- on the northwest by a line beginning on the Charlotte County line about 3.6 kilometres west of Big Kedron Lake and about 4 kilometres east of Route 3 and running northeasterly parallel to the Sunbury County line until it reaches Fredericton.

== Communities ==
Communities at least partly within the parish. bold indicates an incorporated municipality

- Beaver Dam
- Charters Settlement
- Howorth Acres
- Nasonworth
- **New Maryland**
- Rooth

== Bodies of water ==
Bodies of water (Note: Not including brooks, ponds or coves.) at least partly within the parish.

- North Branch Oromocto River
- Lyons Stream
- Nasonworth Millstream
- South Branch Rusagonis Stream
- Yoho Stream
- Big Kedron Lake
- Little Lake
- Little Kedron Lake
- Mud Lake
- Oromocto Lake
  - The Basin

== Islands ==
Islands at least partly within the parish.

- Camp Jersey Island

== Other notable places ==
Parks, historic sites, and other noteworthy places at least partly within the parish.

- University of New Brunswick Wildlife Refuge

== Demographics ==
Parish population total does not include village of New Maryland

=== Population ===
**Population trend**

Census	Population	Change (%)
2016	2,606	▲5.7%
2011	2,466	▲5.0%
2006	2,348	▲2.7%
2001	2,286	▲4.2%
1996	2,193	▲18.0%
1991	1,858	N/A

=== Language ===
**Mother tongue (2016)**

Language	Population	Pct (%)
English only	2,300	88.5%
French only	240	9.2%
Other languages	40	1.5%
Both English and French	20	0.8%

== See also ==
- List of parishes in New Brunswick
