= St. Mary's First Nation =

St. Mary's Band Sitansisk Wolastoqiyik
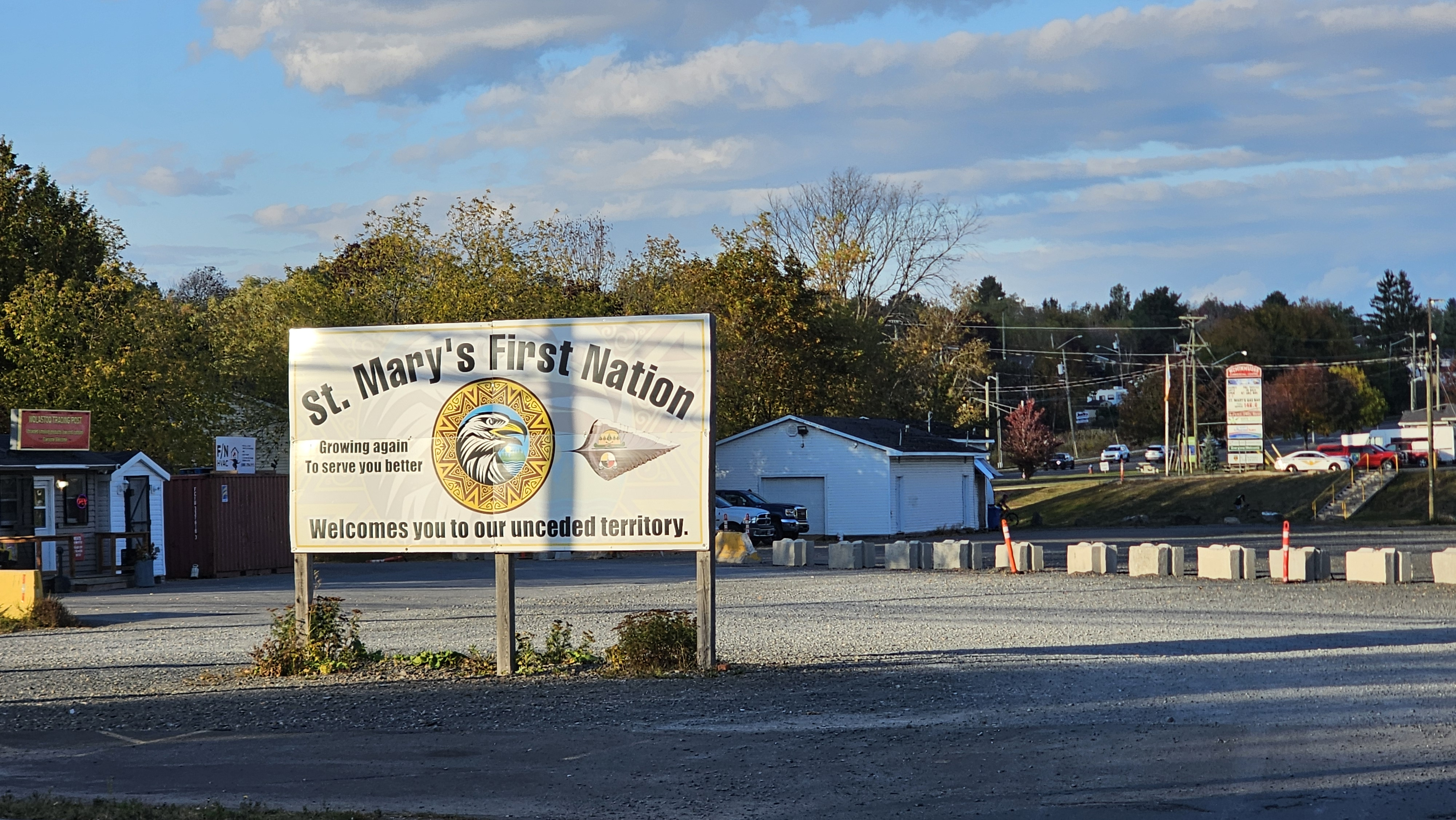
- St. Mary's First Nation in 2025

- Seal

- Location of the St. Mary's Band in New Brunswick
- Coordinates: 45°58′00″N 66°38′00″W
- Country: Canada
- Province: New Brunswick
- County: York County
- Established: 1867

Government
  - Sakom (Chief): Allan Polchies Jr. (Chicky)
  - Council: Shelley Polchies; Montgomery Paul; Shannon Polches; Barbara Paul; Micheal Bear; Stephen Meuse; Storm Perley-Brooks; Mandy Meuse; Melanie Berube; Judy Fullarton; Robert Paul; Erica Paul
  - MP: David Myles (L)
  - Provincial Representatives: Luke Randall (L)

Area
  - Total: 3.08 km^{2} (1.19 sq mi)
- Lowest elevation: 4 m (13 ft)

Population (2014)
  - Total: 1,822
- Time zone: UTC-4 (Atlantic (AST))
  - Summer (DST): UTC-3 (ADT)
- NTS Map: 021G15
- Website: https://www.stmarysfirstnation.com/
- Postal code span: E3A 2V1, E3A 2T9, E3A 5V9, E3A 5R7, E3A 2V2, E3A 0A1

St. Mary's Band or St. Mary's First Nation (Malecite-Passamaquoddy: Sitansisk Wolastoqiyik) is one of six Wolastoqiyik or Maliseet Nations on the Saint John River in Canada.

The St. Mary's Band lands comprise two reserves (Saint Mary's # 24, 1 ha; Devon # 30, 131.5 ha). The Saint Mary's reserve, established in 1867, lies on the northeast bank of the Saint John River, opposite downtown Fredericton. A second, larger reserve, purchased in 1929, lies 3 km NNE of the St. Mary's reservation. Land acquisitions in 2002 expanded the reserve lands to 308 ha before the acquisition of the Howe Street connector, and the former MacLeans Motorsports property on Union Street in 2017 and 2024 respectively. Roughly half the members of the St. Mary's First Nation reside on the reserve lands.

The founding of the 1867 Reserve is attributed to Gabriel Acquin, a Wolastoqew hunter, guide and interpreter.

The community operates several economic development ventures, including St. Mary's Retail Sales and St. Mary's Entertainment Centre and is the largest local employer in Fredericton North. In May 2024, St. Mary's Retail Sales announced the closure of St. Mary's Supermarket, effective June 31, 2024, citing the loss of the Wolastoqey tax-revenue sharing agreements and anti-competitive business practices from larger retailers as the reason for expected losses exceeding $1 million.
