= Maple Ridge, New Brunswick =

Coordinates: 46.103°N 67.212°W

Location of Maple Ridge in New Brunswick

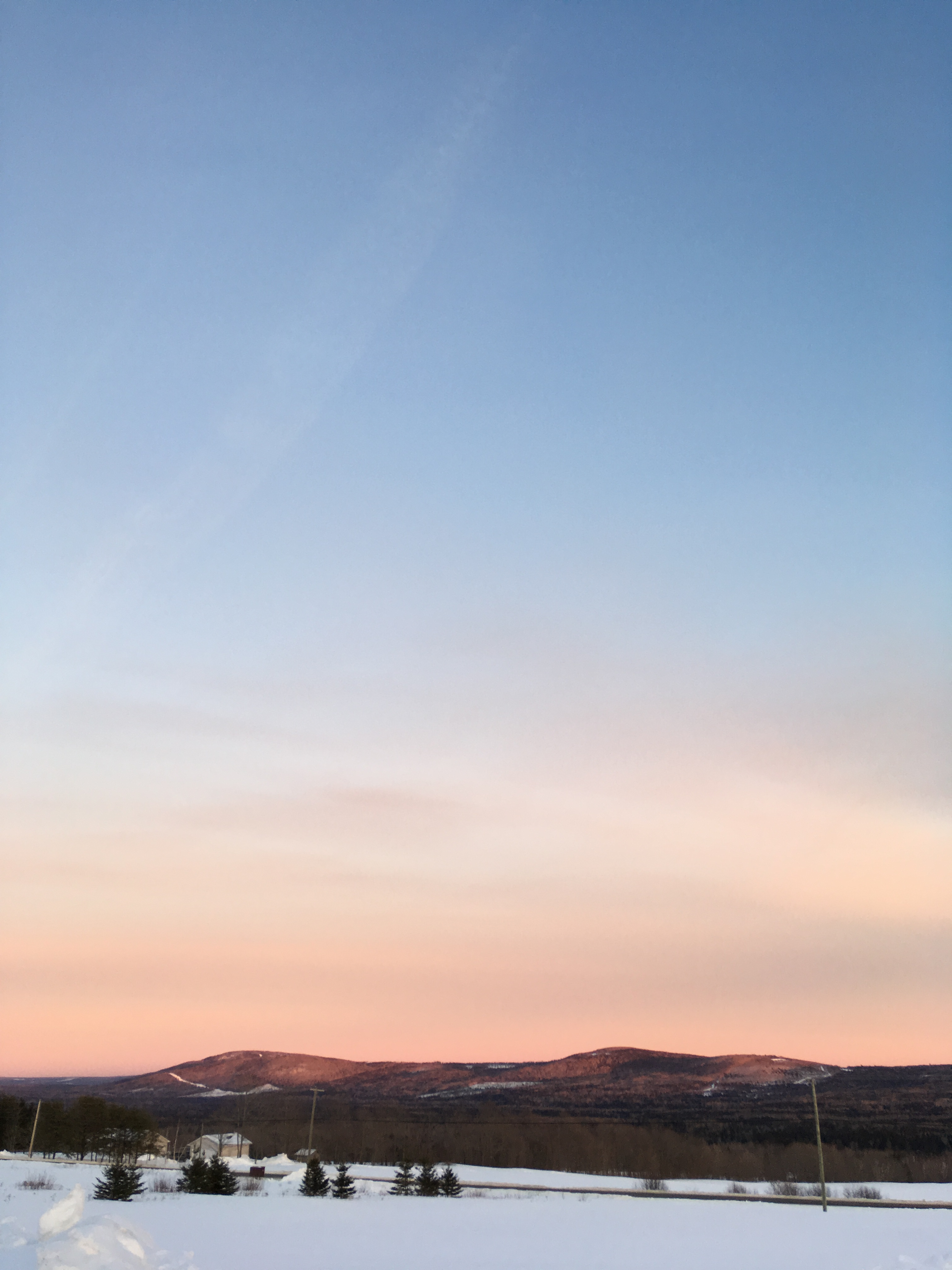
View of sunrise on Maple Ridge, January 2018

Maple Ridge is a settlement in New Brunswick on Route 605.

== See also ==
- List of communities in New Brunswick
