= Hainesville, New Brunswick =

Coordinates: 46.119722°N 67.137361°W

Location of Hainesville in New Brunswick

Hainesville is a community in the Canadian province of New Brunswick.

== See also ==
- List of communities in New Brunswick
