= Caverhill, New Brunswick =

Community in New Brunswick, Canada

Coordinates: 46.073417°N 67.235639°W

Location of Caverhill in New Brunswick

Caverhill is a community in the Canadian province of New Brunswick. Route 605 passes through Caverhill.

== See also ==
- List of communities in New Brunswick
