= Campbell Settlement, York County =

Coordinates: 46.144°N 67.670°W

Location of Campbell Settlement in New Brunswick

Campbell Settlement is a settlement in York County, New Brunswick on Route 555.

== See also ==
- List of communities in New Brunswick
