= Kingsclear Parish, New Brunswick =

Kingsclear
- Parish
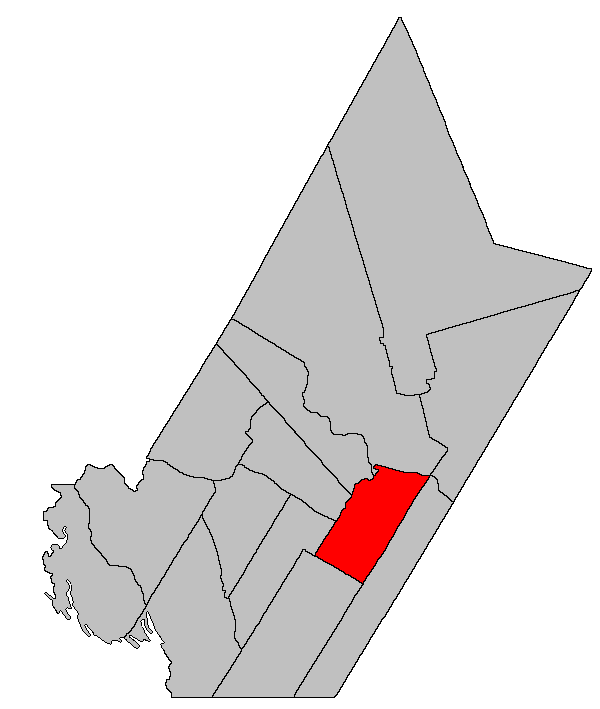
- Location within York County, New Brunswick.
- Coordinates: 45.885°N 66.9075°W
- Country: Canada
- Province: New Brunswick
- County: York
- Erected: 1786

Area
  - Land: 150.11 km^{2} (57.96 sq mi)

Population (2021)
  - Total: 2,839
  - Density: 18.9/km^{2} (49/sq mi)
  - Change 2016-2021: ▲0.6%
  - Dwellings: 1,104
- Time zone: UTC-4 (AST)
  - Summer (DST): UTC-3 (ADT)
- Figures do not include portions within the city of Fredericton, the Kingsclear 6 Indian reserve, and the rural community of Hanwell

Kingsclear is a geographic parish in York County, New Brunswick, Canada.

Prior to the 2023 governance reform, for governance purposes it was divided between the city of Fredericton, the Indian reserve of Kingsclear 6, the incorporated rural community of Hanwell, and the local service district of the parish of Kingsclear, all of which except the Indian reserve were members of Capital Region Service Commission (RSC11). The LSD includes the special service area of Oswald Gray.

== Origin of name ==
The parish's name may be a shortening of King's Clearing, a reference to early clearing of forests in the area.

== History ==
Kingsclear was erected in 1786 as one of the county's original parishes. The parish ran twelve miles back into the country and included the islands in front of it in the Saint John River.

In 1845 Madam Keswick Island (Keswick Island and Mitchells Island) was transferred to Douglas Parish.

In 1850 the area behind Fredericton was included in the newly erected New Maryland Parish; Merrithews Island (Upper and Lower Shores Islands) was transferred to Douglas; and Kingsclear was extended back to the Charlotte County line.

In 1855 the rear of Kingsclear was included in the newly erected Manners Sutton Parish.

In 1867 Nevers Island and part of Sugar Island were transferred to Douglas.

In 1869 the 1867 changes were repealed.

In 1903 the 1867 changes were reinstituted.

In 1973 Nevers Island was returned to Kingsclear.

== Boundaries ==
Kingsclear Parish is bounded:

- on the north by the Saint John River;
- on the southeast by a line beginning on the Saint John River about 2.4 kilometres upstream of the Westmorland Street bridge and slightly downstream of Riverside Court, then running south-southwesterly along the prolongation of the western line of the University of New Brunswick Game Refuge and the Refuge itself to the rear line of Fredericton, (Note: This was the western boundary of Fredericton before the amalgamations of 1973 and is what's used in the Territorial Division Act.) then running southwesterly about 23 kilometres along the New Maryland Parish-Hanwell boundary to the northeastern line of Manners Sutton Parish;
- on the southwest by a line running north 45º west, (Note: By the magnet of 1896, when declination in the area was between 19º and 20º west of north. The Territorial Division Act clause referring to magnetic direction bearings was omitted in the 1952 and 1973 Revised Statutes.) along the rear line of Hanwell and the southeastern line a grant to James Taylor on the western side of Route 640, to a point about 1.25 kilometres past Jewetts Creek;
- on the northwest by the prolongation of the northwestern line of the New Market Settlement Grants, which run along Route 3 east of Kings Landing, striking the Saint John River on the eastern side of Wheeler Cove;
- including all islands in the Saint John River in front of the parish except Upper Shores, Lower Shores, Mitchells, Merrithews, (Note: On the western side of Keswick and Mitchells Islands, now a peninsula rather than an island.) and Keswick, and part of Sugar Island roughly north and west of the Baseline Road.

== Communities ==
Communities at least partly within the parish. bold indicates an incorporated municipality, incorporated rural community or Indian reserve

- Central Kingsclear
- **Fredericton**
  - Garden Creek
  - Springhill
- French Village
- **Hanwell**
  - Somerset Park
  - Starlite Village
- Island View
- Kingsclear
- **Kingsclear 6**
- Longs Creek
- Mazerolle Settlement
- Newmarket
- Oswald Gray
- Smithfield
- Yoho

== Bodies of water ==
Bodies of water (Note: Not including brooks, ponds or coves.) at least partly within the parish.

- Saint John River
  - Glooscap Reach
  - Grand Pass
  - Scoodawakscook Bend
- Nasonworth Millstream
- South Branch Rusagonis Stream
- Currier Creek
- Garden Creek
- Kellys Creek
  - Kellys Creek Basin
- Longs Creek
  - Longs Creek Arm
- Shin Creek
- Mactaquac Lake
- Murray Lake
- Tower Lake
- Yoho Lake

== Islands ==
Islands at least partly within the parish. italics indicate a name no longer in official use

- Burpee Island
- Clements Island
- Currie Island
- Dunphy Island
- Eqpahak (Savage Island)
- Hartts Island
- Jewett Island
- McGibbon Island
- Murray Island
- Nevers Island
- Parsnip Island
- Pitt Island
- Ross Island
- Sugar Island

== Other notable places ==
Parks, historic sites, and other noteworthy places at least partly within the parish.

- Mactaquac Dam
- University of New Brunswick Wildlife Refuge
- Woolastook Provincial Park

== Demographics ==
Parish population total does not include Hanwell, Kingsclear 6 Indian reserve, and portion within Fredericton

=== Population ===
**Population trend**

| Census | Kingsclear | Hanwell | Total Population | Change (%) |
|---|---|---|---|---|
| 2016 | 2,822 | 4,750 | 7,572 | ▲2.4% |
| 2011 revised | 2,651 | 4,740 (Note: The 2011 population count of the LSD was only 2,947 and the rural community had the same boundaries as the LSD.) | 7,391 | 0% |
| 2011 | 7,391 | -- | 7,391 | ▲10.5% |
| 2006 | 6,689 | -- | 6,689 | ▲5.4% |
| 2001 | 6,349 | -- | 6,349 | ▼4.6% |
| 1996 adj | 6,653 | -- | 6,653 | ▲13.8% |
| 1996 | 5,844 | -- | 5,844 | ▲15.6% |
| 1991 | 5,055 | -- | 5,055 | N/A |

- "2011 revised" reflects the result after the creation of the Rural Community of Hanwell

=== Language ===
**Mother tongue language (2006)**

| Language | Population | Pct (%) |
|---|---|---|
| English only | 5,760 | 86.68% |
| French only | 655 | 9.86% |
| Other languages | 185 | 2.78% |
| Both English and French | 45 | 0.68% |

== See also ==
- List of parishes in New Brunswick
