= Rossville, New Brunswick =

Coordinates: 46°00′48″N 67°15′40″W

Rossville is a community in the Canadian province of New Brunswick, 2.3 kilometres (1.4 mi) west of Nackawic-Millville.

== See also ==
- List of communities in New Brunswick
