= Hanwell, New Brunswick =

Hanwell
- Rural community
- Location of Hanwell in Canada Hanwell (New Brunswick)
- Coordinates: 45.868°N 66.795°W
- Country: Canada
- Province: New Brunswick
- County: York County

Government

Area
  - Land: 152.06 km^{2} (58.71 sq mi)

Population (2021)
  - Total: 4,743
  - Density: 31.2/km^{2} (81/sq mi)
  - Change (2016–21): ▲0.9%
- Time zone: UTC-4 (AST)
  - Summer (DST): UTC-3 (ADT)

Hanwell is an incorporated rural community and former local service district within Kingsclear Parish in York County, New Brunswick, Canada. It is located on Route 640 immediately southwest of Fredericton.

On 1 January 2023, Hanwell annexed the northern part the local service district of the parish of Kingsclear, including the communities of French Village, Island View, and Mazerolle Settlement; the annexed communities' names remain in official use. Revised census figures have not been released.

== History ==
Hanwell was named by Thomas Baillie, who was born at Hanwell, West London, England. Baillie brought Irish immigrants over to settle in the area in 1825.

Originally a local service district (LSD) and a farming community, two residential subdivisions were constructed in Hanwell in the 1970s. The LSD was officially incorporated as the Rural Community of Hanwell on May 23, 2014. Prior to official incorporation, the rural community's first election was held May 12, 2014. The first council's oath of office and meeting following shortly after incorporation on May 27, 2014.

== Geography ==
Communities within Hanwell include Birchwood Estates, Brookdale Gardens, Brookdale Subdivision, Cobblestone Estates, Deerwood Acres, Eagle Ridge, Eaglewood Subdivision, Greer Subdivision, Somerset Park and Starlite Village. Hanwell also encompasses Yoho Lake, which has homes on the lakefront and a Scouts Canada lodge.

== Demographics ==
In the 2021 Census of Population conducted by Statistics Canada, Hanwell had a population of 4,743 living in 1,799 of its 1,887 total private dwellings, a change of 0.9% from its 2016 population of 4,700. With a land area of 152.06 km^{2} (58.71 sq mi), it had a population density of 31.2/km^{2} (80.8/sq mi) in 2021.

== Attractions ==
Hanwell is the location of Kingswood Park, a large entertainment centre and golf course, and the Hanwell Recreation Park.

== Government ==
In 2016, a regular municipal election was held and the following individuals were elected:

Chris Melvin - Mayor (resigned October 20, 2018); Dave Morrison - Deputy Mayor and Ward 3 Councillor; Councillors at Large - Darren MacKenzie and Nicolle Carlin; Ward 1 Councillor - Susan Jonah; Ward 2 Councillor - Holly Hyslop; Ward 4 Councillor - Melissa Smith

As of August 2019, the Council consists of: Mayor Susan Cassidy; Councillors at Large Darren MacKenzie and Dan Fortier; and Ward Councillors Susan Jonah (Ward 1), Holly Hyslop (Ward 2), Dave Morrison (Ward 3, also Deputy Mayor), and Melissa Smith (Ward 4).
