= Magaguadavic, New Brunswick =

Coordinates: 47.081°N 65.394°W

Location of Magaguadavic in New Brunswick

Magaguadavic is a settlement in New Brunswick.

== See also ==
- List of communities in New Brunswick
- Magaguadavic Lake
- Magaguadavic River
