= Hartfield, New Brunswick =

Community in New Brunswick, Canada

Coordinates: 46.024083°N 67.32025°W

Location of Hartfield in New Brunswick

Hartfield is a community in the Canadian province of New Brunswick.

== See also ==
- List of communities in New Brunswick
