= New Maryland, New Brunswick =

New Maryland
- Village
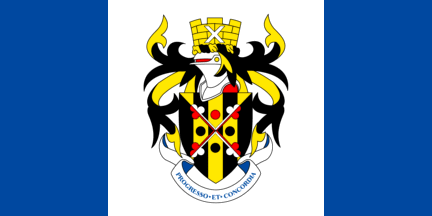
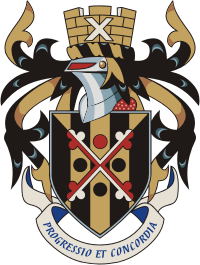
- Flag Coat of arms
- Motto: Progressio Et Concordia
- Location of New Maryland in New Brunswick
- Coordinates: 45.89500°N 66.68212°W
- Country: Canada
- Province: New Brunswick
- County: York
- Metropolitan Area: Greater Fredericton
- Incorporated: June 1, 1991
- Named after: Maryland

Government
  - Type: Village Council
  - Mayor: Alex Scholten
  - Councillors: Steve Clements, Laurie Pearson, Mike Pope, Tim Scammell, Mariet van Groenewoud

Area
  - Total: 21.25 km^{2} (8.20 sq mi)

Population (2021)
  - Total: 4,153
  - Density: 195.4/km^{2} (506/sq mi)
  - Change (2016–21): ▼0.5%
- Time zone: UTC-4 (AST)
  - Summer (DST): UTC-3 (ADT)
- Canadian Postal code: E3C
- Area code: 506
- Website: http://www.vonm.ca

New Maryland is a village and suburban bedroom community of Fredericton in central New Brunswick, Canada; located directly south of Fredericton, south of Route 2 and Route 101. As of 2021, the population was 4,153, which means it is large enough to become a town. New Maryland, along with having one of the highest average household networth has a median household income of over $116,000, the highest of any municipality in New Brunswick and across all of Atlantic Canada.

New Maryland was officially incorporated as a village on June 1, 1991. Today the village is home to many businesses including a pub, pharmacy, post office, hairdressers, a vehicle repair shop, and two gas stations along with several more small businesses. New Maryland is also home to New Maryland Elementary School and multiple daycares which serve the village and its outlying areas. Virtually all of the residents now commute to Fredericton.

== History ==
The village gets its name from a settler, Mr. Arnold, who traveled to the area from the state of Maryland, United States, in 1817. The area was originally referred to as "Maryland" or "Maryland Hill," but began to be referred to as "New Maryland" in 1825.

New Maryland is the site of the last fatal gun duel in New Brunswick which occurred between George Frederick Street and George Ludlow Wetmore on October 2, 1821 This proclamation appears on the sign for New Maryland on the adjacent Trans-Canada Highway, Route 2. Wetmore–Street Pub, located within the village, gets its name from the two combatants in this duel.

== Demographics ==
Historical populations: New Maryland, NB
Year	Pop.	±%
2001	4,284	—
2006	4,248	−0.8%
2011	4,232	−0.4%
2016	4,174	−1.4%
2021	4,153	−0.5%

In the 2021 Census of Population conducted by Statistics Canada, New Maryland had a population of 4,153 living in 1,529 of its 1,550 total private dwellings, a change of −0.5% from its 2016 population of 4,174. With a land area of 21.25 km^{2} (8.20 sq mi), it had a population density of 195.4/km^{2} (506.2/sq mi) in 2021.

== See also ==
- List of communities in New Brunswick
