= Bright Parish, New Brunswick =

Bright
- Parish
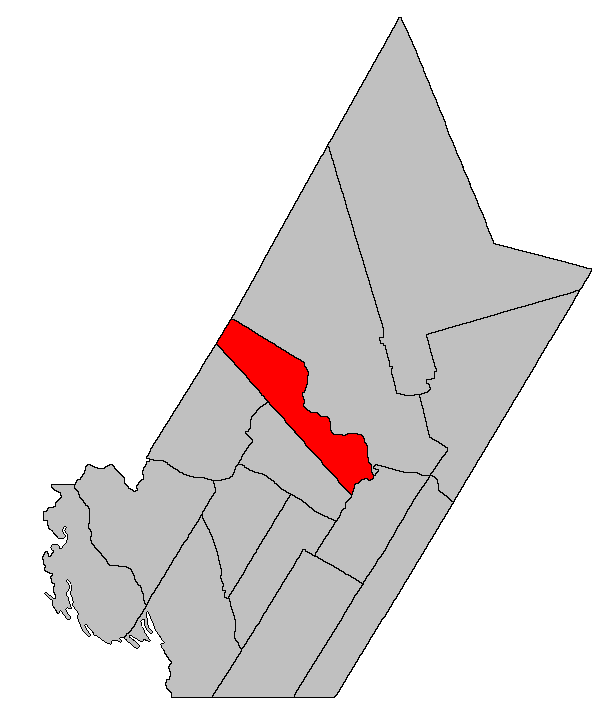
- Location within York County, New Brunswick.
- Coordinates: 46.18°N 67.10°W
- Country: Canada
- Province: New Brunswick
- County: York
- Erected: 1869

Area
  - Land: 403.73 km^{2} (155.88 sq mi)

Population (2021)
  - Total: 3,317
  - Density: 8.2/km^{2} (21/sq mi)
  - Change 2016-2021: ▲0.9%
  - Dwellings: 1,477
- Time zone: UTC-4 (AST)
  - Summer (DST): UTC-3 (ADT)

Bright is a geographic parish in York County, New Brunswick, Canada.

Prior to the 2023 governance reform, for governance purposes it was divided between the local service districts of Keswick Ridge and the parish of Bright, both of which were members of Capital Region Service Commission (RSC11).

== Origin of name ==
The parish was named in honour of John Bright, recently appointed British President of the Board of Trade at the time.

== History ==
Bright was erected in 1869 from Douglas Parish.

== Boundaries ==
Bright Parish is bounded:

- on the northeast and east by a line beginning on the Carleton County line about 1.5 kilometres northeasterly of Little Forks Brook, then running south 40º east (Note: By the magnet of 1869, when declination in the area was between 19º and 20º west of north.) to the mouth of Howard Brook, then down the Keswick River to the Saint John River;
- on the south and southeast by the Saint John River;
- on the southwest by the central line of a two-lot grant to Jonathan Williams, about 675 metres south of the mouth of Currie Brook, then running northwesterly along the Williams line and its prolongation to the Carleton County line at a point about 600 metres northeasterly of Route 104;
- on the northwest by Carleton County.

== Communities ==
Communities at least partly within the parish.

- Barton
- Brewers Mills
- Burtts Corner
- Cahill
- Central Hainesville
- Greenhill
- Hayne
- Howland Ridge
- Jewetts Mills
- Keswick Ridge
- Lower Hainesville
- Mactaquac
- McKeens Corner
- Middle Hainesville
- Morehouse Corner
- Scotch Settlement
- Sisson Settlement
- Tripp Settlement
- Upper Keswick
- Zealand

== Bodies of water ==
Bodies of water (Note: Not including brooks, ponds or coves.) at least partly within the parish.

- Keswick River
- Saint John River
  - Glooscap Reach
- South Branch Becaguimec Stream
- Little Mactaquac Stream
- Mactaquac Stream
  - Mactaquac Stream Basin
- Nackawic Stream
- Alex Creek
- Mill Creek
- Mactaquac Lake
- more than a dozen other officially named lakes

== Other notable places ==
Parks, historic sites, and other noteworthy places at least partly within the parish.

- East Cloverdale Protected Natural Area
- Mactaquac Dam
- Mactaquac Provincial Park
- Otter Brook Protected Natural Area
- Weyman Airpark

== Demographics ==
Revised census figures based on the 2023 local governance reforms have not been released.

=== Population ===
Population trend

Census	Population	Change (%)
2016	3,289	▲7.2%
2011	3,068	▼2.9%
2006	3,159	▲6.8%
2001	2,958	▼0.2%
1996	2,964	▲4.0%
1991	2,849	N/A

=== Language ===
Mother tongue (2016)

Language	Population	Pct (%)
English only	3,090	94.1%
French only	130	3.9%
Other languages	55	1.7%
Both English and French	10	0.3%

== See also ==
- List of parishes in New Brunswick
