= Queensbury Parish, New Brunswick =

Queensbury
- Parish
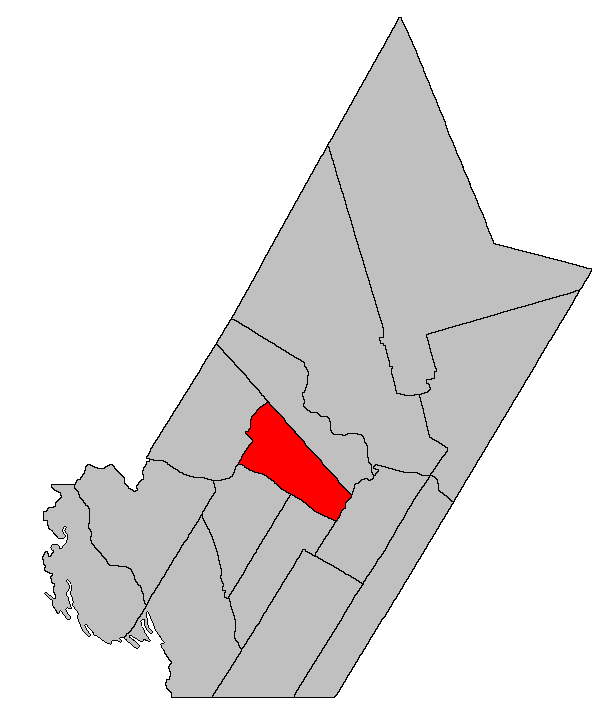
- Location within York County.
- Coordinates: 45.9625°N 67.015°W
- Country: Canada
- Province: New Brunswick
- County: York
- Erected: 1786

Area
  - Land: 294.35 km^{2} (113.65 sq mi)

Population (2021)
  - Total: 1,237
  - Density: 4.2/km^{2} (11/sq mi)
  - Change 2016-2021: ▲5.4%
  - Dwellings: 579
- Time zone: UTC-4 (AST)
  - Summer (DST): UTC-3 (ADT)

Queensbury is a geographic parish in York County, New Brunswick, Canada.

Prior to the 2023 governance reform, for governance purposes it was formed the local service district of the parish of Queensbury, which was a member of Capital Region Service Commission (RSC11).

== Origin of name ==
The area was settled by the Queen's Rangers, a Loyalist unit named in honour of Queen Charlotte.

== History ==
Queensbury was erected in 1786 as one of the original parishes of York County.

In 1824 part of Queensbury was included in the newly erected Douglas Parish.

In 1835 the boundary between Queensbury and Douglas was moved upriver, removing territory from Queensbury.

In 1842 the interior boundary with Douglas was altered.

In 1847 four islands in the Saint John River were transferred from Prince William Parish. Big Coac, Little Coac, and Great Bear all appear on the cadastral map of the area; Bloodworth appears as Heustis Island, which was granted to N. Bloodworth.

In 1865 the boundary with Southampton Parish was altered, adding the remainder of the Caverhill Settlement to Queensbury.

In 1973 all mention of islands in the Saint John River was removed. The islands were flooded by the Mactaquac Dam.

== Boundaries ==
Queensbury Parish is bounded:

- on the northeast beginning where the Burnt Lake Branch crosses the Bright Parish line, about 2.6 kilometres northwesterly of the Central Hainesville Road, and about 3.1 kilometres northeasterly of where Route 104 crosses the East Branch Nackawic Stream, on the prolongation of the central line of a two-lot grant to Jonathan Williams on the Saint John River, then running southeasterly along the prolongation and the Williamson line to the Saint John, about 675 metres south of the mouth of Currie Brook;
- on the southeast and southwest by the Saint John River;
- on the northwest by a line beginning on the shore of the Saint John about 150 metres downstream of the mouth of Quigg Brook, then running northeasterly about 6.4 kilometres along the upper line of a large grant to Major Richard Armstrong and its prolongation to the southeastern line of a grant to William Dobie, about 1.7 kilometres northwesterly of Route 610, then northwesterly about 750 metres along the Dobie grant and its prolongation to the rear line of a grant to John Morehouse, then northeasterly and northwesterly along the Morehouse grant to the East Branch Nackawic Stream, then up the East Branch Nackawic and the Burnt Lake Branch to the starting point.

== Governance ==
The entire parish forms the local service district of the parish of Queensbury, established in 1966 to assess for fire protection. Community services were added in 1967 and first aid and ambulance services in 1978.

== Communities ==
Communities at least partly within the parish.

- Bear Island
- Day Hill
- Granite Hill
- Lower Caverhill
- Lower Line Queensbury
- Lower Queensbury
- McNallys
- Middle Hainesville
- Scotch Lake
- Springfield
- Staples Settlement
- Upper Caverhill
- Upper Hainesville
- Upper Queensbury
- Wiggins Mill

== Bodies of water ==
Bodies of water (Note: Not including brooks, ponds or coves.) at least partly within the parish.

- Saint John River
  - Coac Reach
  - Nackawic Bend
  - Scoodawakscook Bend
- Burtt Lake Branch
- Coac Stream
- Little Mactaquac Stream
- Mactaquac Stream
  - Mactaquac Stream Basin
- Mill Stream
- East Branch Nackawic Stream
- Mazerall Creek
- Pinder Creek
- Sandy Creek
- Campbell Lake
- Coac Lake
- Mactaquac Lake
- Scotch Lake

== Other notable places ==
Parks, historic sites, and other noteworthy places at least partly within the parish.

- Mill Stream-Mactaquac Protected Natural Area
- Scottsfield Airpark Airport

== Demographics ==
=== Population ===
Population trend

Census	Population	Change (%)
2016	1,174	▼7.7%
2011	1,272	▲4.7%
2006	1,215	▼0.7%
2001	1,223	▼0.2%
1996	1,225	▲2.2%
1991	1,199	N/A

=== Language ===
Mother tongue (2016)

Language	Population	Pct (%)
English only	1,110	94.5%
French only	40	3.4%
Other languages	20	1.7%
Both English and French	5	0.4%

== See also ==
- List of parishes in New Brunswick
- Royal eponyms in Canada
