= Prince William Parish, New Brunswick =

Prince William
- Parish
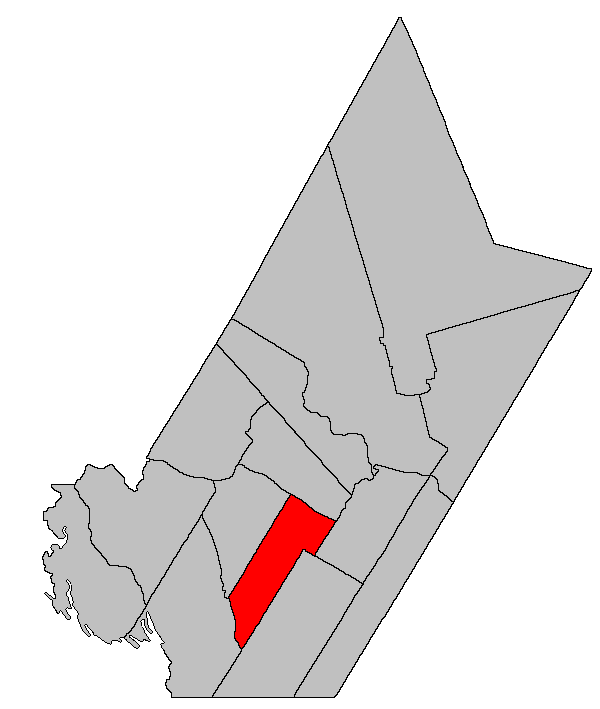
- Location within York County, New Brunswick.
- Coordinates: 45.905°N 67.03°W
- Country: Canada
- Province: New Brunswick
- County: York
- Erected: 1786

Area
  - Land: 284.39 km^{2} (109.80 sq mi)

Population (2021)
  - Total: 1,083
  - Density: 3.8/km^{2} (9.8/sq mi)
  - Change 2016-2021: ▲16.5%
  - Dwellings: 648
- Time zone: UTC-4 (AST)
  - Summer (DST): UTC-3 (ADT)

Prince William is a geographic parish in York County, New Brunswick, Canada.

Prior to the 2023 governance reform, for governance purposes it formed the local service district of the parish of Prince William, which was a member of Capital Region Service Commission (RSC11).

== Origin of name ==
The parish is named in honour of Prince William, patron of the King's American Dragoons who settled the area.

== History ==
Prince William was erected in 1786 as one of the county's original parishes. It extended as far inland as the rear line of Kingsclear Parish, which was twelve miles from the Saint John River, and well as any islands in front of it in the river.

In 1833 the western part of Prince William was included in the newly erected Dumfries Parish.

In 1847 four islands were transferred to Queensbury Parish. Little Coac, Big Coac, and Great Bear all appear on the cadastral map of the area; Bloodworth appears as Heustis Island, which was granted to N. Bloodworth.

In 1855 an interior area was included in the newly erected Manners Sutton Parish.

In 1895 the rear of Prince William was included in the newly erected McAdam Parish.

In 1973 all reference to islands in the Saint John River was removed. The islands were flooded by the Mactaquac Dam.

== Boundaries ==
Prince William Parish is bounded:

- on the northeast by the Saint John River;
- on the southeast by the southeastern line of a grant to Francis Horsman at Wheeler Cove and its prolongation southeasterly about 9.2 kilometres to a line running north 45º west, (Note: By the magnet of 1896, when declination in the area was between 19º and 20º west of north. The Territorial Division Act clause referring to magnetic direction bearings was omitted in the 1952 and 1973 Revised Statutes.) the prolongation of the southwestern line of a grant to James Taylor on the western side of Route 640, then along the prolongation to Lake George, then running southwesterly parallel to the Sunbury County line about 27.7 kilometres to strike the McAdam Parish line about 1 kilometre south of Route 4 and 2.9 kilometres southwest of its junction with Diffen Road;
- on the southwest by the eastern lines of several large grants to the New Brunswick Railway Company and New Brunswick and Canada Railway and Land Company east of McAdam;
- on the west by the prolongation of a grant line on the Saint John River about 300 metres upriver of Rosborough Settlement Road, part of a six-lot grant to St. Clement's Church in Dumfries, then running northeasterly along the prolongation to the river, beginning at a point west of Magaguadavic Lake.

== Communities ==
Communities at least partly within the parish.

- Blaney Ridge
- Donnelly Settlement
- Lake George
- Lake Road
- Lower Prince William
- Magaguadavic
- Magaguadavic Siding
- Magundy
- Pokiok Settlement
- Prince William
- Rosborough Settlement
- Upper Prince William

== Bodies of water ==
Bodies of water (Note: Not including brooks, ponds or coves.) at least partly within the parish.

- Saint John River
  - Coac Reach
  - Scoodawakscook Bend
- Magundy Stream
- Pokiok Stream
- Jewetts Creek
- Joslin Creek
- Dry Lake
- Lake George
- Magaguadavic Lake
- Mink Lake
- Waterloo Lake

== Islands ==
Islands at least partly within the parish.

- Bodkin Island
- Butterfly Island
- Cedar Islands
- Long Island
- Nova Scotia Island

== Other notable places ==
Parks, historic sites, and other noteworthy places at least partly within the parish.

- Kings Landing Historical Settlement
- Kings Landing Wildlife Management Area

== Demographics ==
=== Population ===
Population trend

Census	Population	Change (%)
2016	930	▲3.9%
2011	895	▲1.8%
2006	879	▲6.0%
2001	829	▼5.5%
1996	877	▲0.9%
1991	869	N/A

=== Language ===
Mother tongue (2016)

Language	Population	Pct (%)
English only	860	92.5%
French only	30	3.2%
Other languages	30	3.2%
Both English and French	10	1.1%

== See also ==
- List of parishes in New Brunswick
