= Mactaquac =

Mactaquac may refer to:

- Mactaquac Dam, a hydro-electric power generating facility on the St. John River in New Brunswick, Canada
- Mactaquac Provincial Park, a park located on the dam's headpond
- Mactaquac, New Brunswick, unincorporated community in the Fredericton area
- Mactaquac (electoral district), a riding which elects members to the Legislative Assembly of New Brunswick
- Tobique–Mactaquac, a riding which elects members to the Canadian House of Commons
