= Dumfries (disambiguation) =

Dumfries is a Scottish town.

Dumfries may also refer to:

== In or around the Scottish town ==
- Dumfries (HM Prison)
- Dumfries (Parliament of Scotland constituency), prior to 1707
- Dumfries (Scottish Parliament constituency) (1999–2011)
- Dumfries and Galloway, a region/council area in Scotland since 1975
- Dumfries Burghs (UK Parliament constituency) (1708–1918)
- Dumfriesshire, a historic county in Scotland, abolished in 1975
- Dumfriesshire (Parliament of Scotland constituency), prior to 1707, also known as Dumfries
- Dumfriesshire (UK Parliament constituency) (1708–2005), known from 1950 to 2005 as Dumfries
- Dumfries railway station, in the town

== Other meanings ==
- Dumfries, Minnesota, US
- Dumfries Parish, New Brunswick, Canada
  - Dumfries, New Brunswick, an unincorporated community therein
- Dumfries, Virginia, United States, a town
- North Dumfries, a township in Ontario, Canada
- Denzel Dumfries (born 1996), Dutch footballer
