= Crabbe Mountain =

Alpine ski hill in New Brunswick, Canada

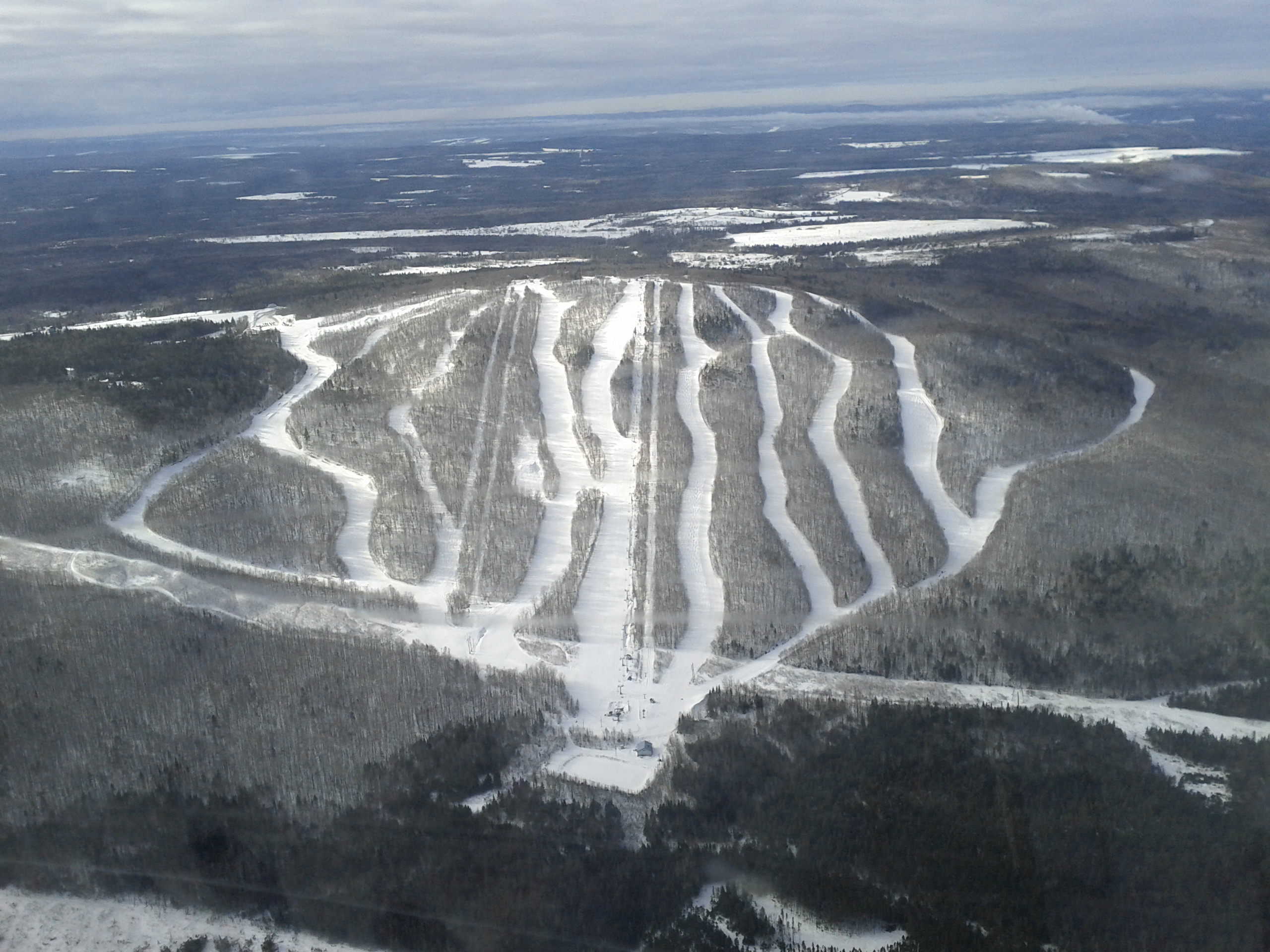
- Interactive map of Crabbe Mountain
- Location: Central Hainesville, Bright Parish, York County, New Brunswick, Canada
- Nearest city: Fredericton
- Coordinates: 46°07′13″N 67°06′31″W
- Vertical: 260 m (850 ft)
- Top elevation: 404 m (1,325 ft)
- Base elevation: 145 m (476 ft)
- Skiable area: 0.35 km^{2} (0.14 sq mi)
- Trails: 34
- Longest run: 2.0 km (1.2 mi)
- Lift system: 3 1 quad chair, (1 rope tow, and 1 T-Bar)
- Terrain parks: 1
- Snowfall: Average 330 cm (10.83 ft) /year: 2007/08= 457 cm (14.99 ft); 2008/09= 370 cm (12.14 ft); 2009/10= 201 cm (6.59 ft); 2010/11= 299 cm (9.81 ft); 2011/12= 320 cm (10.50 ft); 2012/13= 332 cm (10.89 ft); 2013/14= 135 cm (4.43 ft)
- Snowmaking: 53 %
- Night skiing: Yes, on 6 trails
- Website: http://www.crabbemountain.com

Crabbe Mountain is a Canadian alpine ski hill in Central Hainesville, New Brunswick, near the intersection of Route 104 and Route 610. Crabbe Mountain was first skied in the spring of 1959 when three explored and cut the first trail on the mountain, Tippy Canoe.

At 853 feet, Crabbe Mountain offer New Brunswick's highest vertical features challenging terrain for skiers of all abilities. Crabbe Mountain has a wide-open beginner area with a pony lift for those just starting out. There is a wide variety of groomed, ungroomed, cruising trails and steep pitches. Crabbe offers many woods/glades runs, and they have some features such as tree rails, rock jumps and north shores. Crabbe has a terrain park with jumps, boxes and rails.

The Crabbe Mountain base lodge offers a lounge, cafeteria, retail and rental shop. Ski and board lessons are available and the mountain is patrolled by the Canadian Ski Patrol.

== Information ==
=== Trails ===
Trail	Difficulty
1. Beginner Hill	
2. Rockstar Terrain Park	
3. Dave's Dream	
4. Upper Dave's Dream	
5. Greg's Way	
6. Diddle Daddle	
7. Diddle Daddle Glades	
8. Sun Valley Glades	
9. The Glades	
10. Little brave	
11. War Dance	
12. Pole Line	
13. Hume's Flume	
14. Flume Chute	
15. Whopper	
16. King's Horn	
17. Chair Line	
18. Elgee's Bumps	
19. Norm's Nightmare	
20. Hot Dog	
21. Tippy Canoe	
22. Harold's Fun Run	
23. Pug's powder	
24. Steve's Drive-thru	
25. Little Dodgem Glades	
26. Dineen's Ravine	
27. Dax Trax	

Crabbe also features 30 kilometres, 18+ miles of cross country skiing trails.

=== Lifts ===
Crabbe has 1 Quad chair lift, 1 T-bar lifts and 1 rope tow.

Crabbe Mountain was originally serviced by rope tow, powered by an old truck engine. Through the years Crabbe has seen the addition of 2 T -bar lifts, and several versions of a rope tow. In 1987 a high speed quad was installed on the mountain, and increased lift capacity and speed greatly.

=== Terrain Park ===
Check out the Crabbe Mountain website for info: http://www.crabbemountain.com/mountain/terrain_park/

=== Race Club ===
Crabbe Mountain also has a very successful race club, it does extremely well in the Atlantic circuit and has also won a few major competitions including a gold in Super G the Canadian nationals.

=== Summer ===
With the addition of downhill mountain biking trails in 2006 Crabbe began to expand its operations into the summertime. Crabbe Mountain currently has 6 downhill mountain bike trails, serviced by a shuttle on select nights during the biking season. Many events such as a downhill mountain bike race, enduro bike race, and dirt bike hare scramble have taken place in the summer months since the trails have been built.

== History ==
Crabbe Mountain is named after the first known owner of much of the property of Crabbe Mountain. Lemuel Jenkins Crabbe lived and worked in the area for most of his life from 1799 to 1865. He lived on the property that is directly below the Crabbe parking lot and is buried in a small, out of the way cemetery on the property. Many of his descendants still live locally and some work at Crabbe Mountain.

Crabbe Mountain Winter Park Ltd. was incorporated on December 13, 1961. The new facilities consist of a rope tow, three trails, tarpaper warming hut, ski school and a small number of shareholders. In its first year, Crabbe Mountain Winter Park Ltd. had a recorded income of $15.50.

In January 2013, a ski instructor was killed when he collided with a skier at the bottom of a hill.

In 2015, the Wilson family sold Crabbe Mountain to a group of new local owners with a shared passion for the mountain. These new owners, as well as passionate members of the Crabbe community now form a board of directors who oversee the direction and operations of the resort.
