= New Brunswick Route 570 =

Highway in New Brunswick, Canada

Coordinates: 46.419872°N 67.470474°W

Route 570

Route information
- Maintained by New Brunswick Department of Transportation
- Length: 16 km (9.9 mi)

Major junctions
- North end: Route 107 in Gordonsville
- South end: Route 104 in Coldstream

Location
- Country: Canada
- Province: New Brunswick

Highway system
- Provincial highways in New Brunswick; Former routes
← Route 565	→ Route 575

Route 570 is a 17-kilometre (11 mi) long north–south secondary highway in the western portion of New Brunswick, Canada.

The route starts at Route 107 in Gordonsville. The road travels south through a mostly forested area through South Gordonsville and Mt. Pleasant. It then briefly turns east and crosses the Cold Stream just before entering Jericho. The road then turns south again in Bannon before ending at Route 104 on the Becaguimec Stream east of Bubartown near Coldstream.
