= New Brunswick Route 605 =

Highway in New Brunswick, Canada

Coordinates: 46.069003°N 67.235641°W

Route 605

Route information
- Maintained by New Brunswick Department of Transportation
- Length: 15 km (9.3 mi)

Major junctions
- North end: Route 104 in Nackawic-Millville
- South end: Route 105 in Nackawic-Millville

Location
- Country: Canada
- Province: New Brunswick

Highway system
- Provincial highways in New Brunswick; Former routes
← Route 595	→ Route 610

Route 605 is a 14.7-kilometre (9.1 mi) long north–south secondary highway in the eastern portion of New Brunswick, Canada.

The route starts at Route 104 in Nackawic-Millville. The road travels southwest through the community of Maple Ridge and past Temperance Vale and Pinder. The road passes the southern terminus of Route 595 and follows the east side of the Nackawic River before ending at Route 105 in Nackawic-Millville.
