= Pokiok Falls =

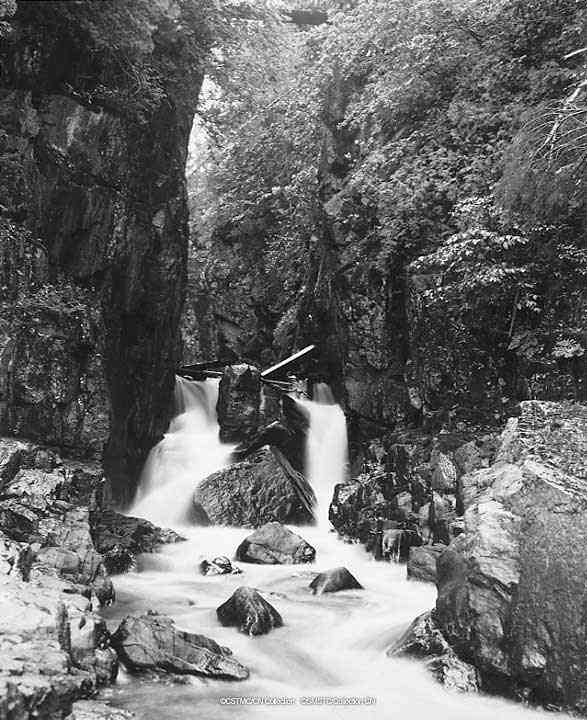
- Pokiok Falls
- Interactive map of Pokiok Falls
- Location: Pokiok, Dumfries Parish, New Brunswick, Canada
- Coordinates: 45°58′N 67°15′W
- Type: Cascade
- Total height: 2 meters (6.6 ft)
- Watercourse: Pokiok Stream

Pokiok Falls is a former waterfall in Pokiok, New Brunswick where the Pokiok Stream emptied over a ledge into the Saint John River. The high water level of the Mactaquac Dam reservoir submerged the waterfall and the Pokiok Gorge in 1967.

== See also ==
- List of waterfalls
- List of waterfalls in Canada
