= Becaguimec Stream =

Watercourse in New Brunswick, Canada

Coordinates: 46°18′05″N 67°31′47″W

The Becaguimec Stream (/ˌbɛkəˈɡwɪmɛk/) is a minor tributary of the Saint John River in the Canadian Province of New Brunswick. It rises in the hilly woods along the county line dividing Carleton County, Canada from York County, Canada in the western region of the province. Its watershed is adjacent to the South Branch of the Southwest Miramichi River, the Nashwaak River, the Keswick River and the Nackawic Stream.

== Features ==
Three primary branches, the North Branch Becaguimec, the South Branch Becaguimec and the Cold Stream compose the Becaguimec Stream. The Cold Stream originates from springs on the western slope of Skedaddle Ridge and the eastern slope of Garvie Mountain in the community of Knowlesville. The North Branch originates in three tiny lakes only a short distance west of the upper reaches of the Nashwaak River: Malcolm Lake, Long Lake and Owl Lake respectively. The South Branch flows from Becaguimec Lake 13 kilometres southeast of the community of Cloverdale. Where the North and South Branches meet is known as the Becaguimec Forks, lying just northwest of the intersection of Provincial Highway 104 and Provincial Highway 575. After that point the stream is sometimes called the Mainstream, from which the adjacent community derives its name. The stream is slow-paced and meandering between the forks and Mill Brook near Ashland, not infrequently changing course because of floods. The gradient of the stream increases from Mill Brook towards the Saint John River. There are several notable eddies and Class 2 rapids along this stretch, not the least of which is known as Hell's Eddy, 2 miles upstream from the stream's mouth. The Becaguimec enters the Saint John River at the town of Hartland, the site of the world's longest covered bridge.

== Fishery ==
The notable fish species found predominantly in the upper reaches of the Becaguimec are Brook trout and rainbow trout. The best time of year for fishing trout is from mid-May to mid-June, after the sediment clears from the water after the thaw, but before the summer heat increases the water temperature.

== History ==
The Wolastoqiyik (Maliseet) people named the river for the bountiful salmon pool which lay at the mouth of the stream. The name "Becaguimec" literally means "the place where the salmon lie." The construction of the hydroelectric dam at Mactaquac Dam in 1967 has since decimated the salmon population in the Saint John River.

The fertile land at the mouth of the Becaguimec has likely been inhabited for millennia. The hill above the south bank of the stream's mouth (Hagerman's Hill) made an exceptional look-out point from which several miles up the Saint John River can be seen. One of the earliest records of permanent settlement at this site indicates that in 1790 a Wolastoqiyik man by the name of Governor Toma was found "tilling his cornfield" at the mouth of the Becaguimec. The first European settler to arrive at the mouth of the Becaguimec was Loyalist William Orser in 1797. Several more families soon followed and a community coalesced known as Mouth of 'Guimac. Mouth of 'Guimac was renamed Hartland in 1860. Settlement of the Becaguimec Valley itself began with the establishment of the community of Rockland in 1825 and Coldstream in or about 1826.

== River crossings ==
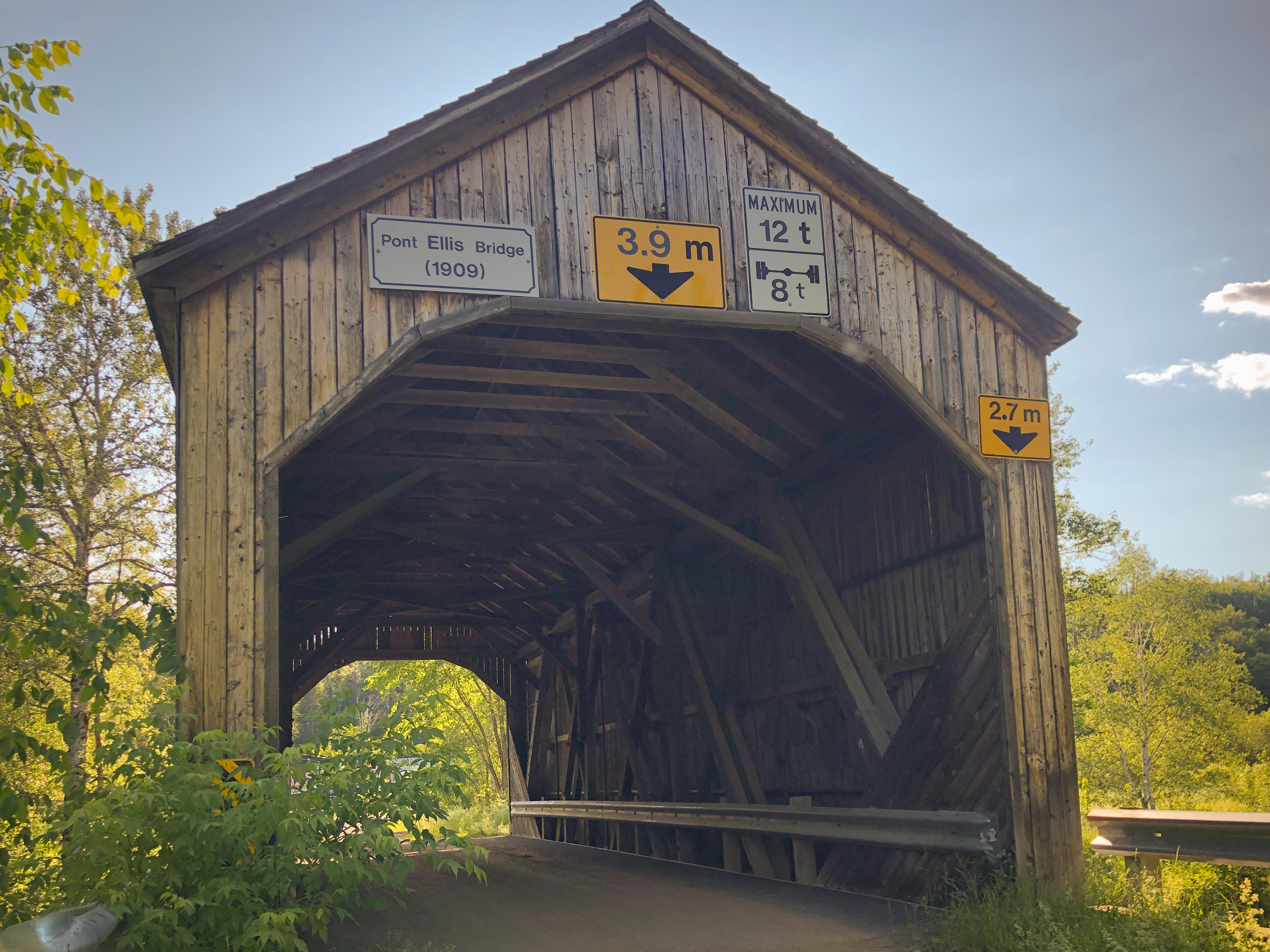
North Becaguimec No. 4 (Ellis)

Three covered bridges once crossed the Becaguimec Stream, though only one remains standing. The Mangrum or Stormdale Bridge (Becaguimec Stream No. 3), which was constructed in 1909, burned in 2011. The Adair Bridge (North Becaguimec No. 1), which was constructed in 1948, burned in 2009. Only the Ellis Bridge (North Becaguimec No. 4) remains.

A a concrete road bridge (New Brunswick Highway 105) crosses the stream at Hartland paralleled by a Canadian Pacific Railway trestle (now part of The Great Trail). In 1922, an earlier steel truss bridge, located slightly upstream of the trestle, was destroyed when impounded logs broke free following heavy rains and crashed into the bridge. The trestle was pushed more than a metre out of alignment.

== Mills ==
It is not clear when the first water-driven grist (flour) mill at the mouth of the Becaguimec was established; however it was recorded in the Carleton Sentinel that this mill burned in 1853. A new grist mill and sawmill was then established at some point between the fire and 1872 by Benjamin Jewett. The mill was then leased to Alexander Shaw in 1887 who introduced a steam engine to the operation the following year. Jewett eventually sold the mill to Al Sawyer, a lumber merchant from St. Stephen, under whose direction the mill expanded and began to ship lumber directly to St. Stephen by rail. Sawyer sold the mill in 1905 to Fred E. Sayre. The administration of the mill then passed on to Fred Sayre's son, John Sayre who closed in the mill in 1928, after being reconstructed the previous year due to a 1926 fire.

== Alternative spellings ==
Becaguimic, Becaguimac, Bekagoomik, Abekagumic
