= New Brunswick Route 615 =

Highway in New Brunswick, Canada

Coordinates: 46.008737°N 67.035871°W

Route 615

Route information
- Maintained by New Brunswick Department of Transportation
- Length: 23 km (14 mi)

Major junctions
- East end: Route 610 in Upper Caverhill
- West end: Route 105 in Mactaquac

Location
- Country: Canada
- Province: New Brunswick

Highway system
- Provincial highways in New Brunswick; Former routes
← Route 610	→ Route 616

Route 615 is a 23.2-kilometre (14.4 mi) long east–west secondary highway in the eastern portion of New Brunswick, Canada.

The route starts at Route 610 in Upper Caverhill northeast of the rural community of Nackawic-Millville. The road travels southeast through a mostly forested area to the communities of Lower Caverhill, Springfield, Scotch Settlement, and Jewetts Mills. Continuing, the road ends at Route 105 in Mactaquac on the west bank of the Mactaquac Basin close to the Mactaquac Dam.
