= Dumfries Parish, New Brunswick =

Dumfries
- Parish
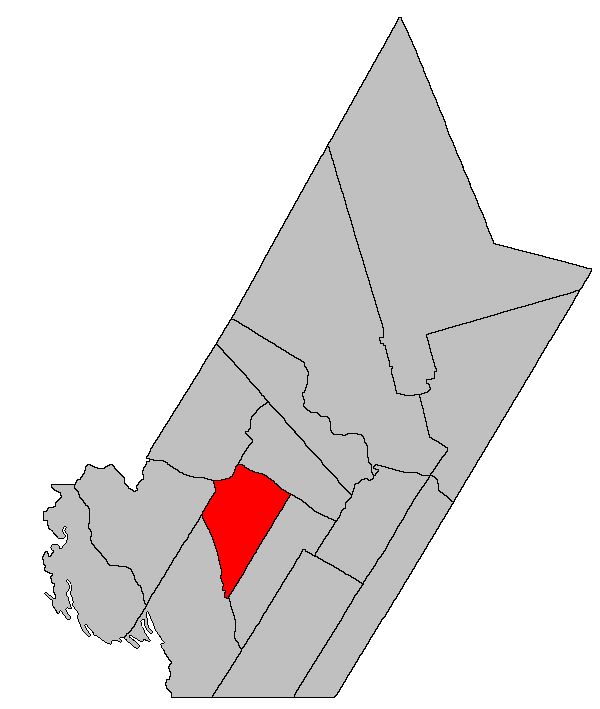
- Location within York County, New Brunswick.
- Coordinates: 45.965°N 67.15°W
- Country: Canada
- Province: New Brunswick
- County: York
- Erected: 1833

Area
  - Land: 298.51 km^{2} (115.26 sq mi)

Population (2021)
  - Total: 420
  - Density: 1.4/km^{2} (3.6/sq mi)
  - Change 2016-2021: ▲18.0%
  - Dwellings: 304
- Time zone: UTC-4 (AST)
  - Summer (DST): UTC-3 (ADT)

Dumfries is a geographic parish in York County, New Brunswick, Canada.

Prior to the 2023 governance reform, for governance purposes it formed the local service district of the parish of Dumfries, which was a member of Capital Region Service Commission (RSC11).

== Origin of name ==
The parish may have been named in honour of Capt. Adam Allen, a Loyalist born in Dumfries, Scotland, who settled at the mouth of the Pokiok River.

== History ==
Dumfries was erected in 1833 from Prince William Parish. and that part of Woodstock Parish south of the Carleton County line.

In 1834 the county line was altered to follow grant lines when it neared the Saint John River, transferring several small areas between Dumfries and Woodstock.

In 1836 the Saint John River islands in front of Dumfries were formally added to the parish, correcting an oversight in the legislation erecting Dumfries.

In 1850 Big and Little Coac Islands were removed from Dumfries.

In 1855 the western part of Dumfries was erected as Canterbury Parish.

In 1895 the rear of Dumfries was included in the newly erected McAdam Parish.

In 1973 the islands in the Saint John River were removed from the parish. The islands were flooded by the Mactaquac Dam.

== Boundaries ==
Dumfries Parish is bounded:

- on the northeast by the Saint John River;
- on the southeast by the southeastern line of a lot within a six-lot grant to St. Clement's Church in Dumfries on the Saint John River, about 300 metres upriver of Rosborough Settlement Road, then along the prolongation of the grant line to the southern line of a grant to Arthur Henry on the western side of Duck Brook, west of Magaguadavic Lake, then westerly to the southwestern corner of the Henry grant;
- on the southwest by a large grant to the New Brunswick and Canada Railway and Land Company northeast of McAdam, then northerly along the railway grant and the prolongation of its eastern line to Shogomoc Lake, then running north-northwesterly along grant lines to a point about 825 metres east of Moon Pond;
- on the northwest by a line paralleling the southeastern line of the parish from east of Moon Pond to the southwestern corner of a grant to John Benn, which straddles Allandale Road, then along the Benn grant to the Saint John River.

== Governance ==
The entire parish forms the local service district of the parish of Dumfries, established in 1966 to assess for fire protection. Community services were added to the assessment in 1967 and first aid and ambulance services in 1978.

== Communities ==
Communities at least partly within the parish. italics indicate a name no longer in official use

- Allandale
- Barony
- Carson
- Davidson Lake
- Dumfries
- Hawkshaw
- Murray
- Pokiok

== Bodies of water ==
Bodies of water (Note: Not including brooks, ponds or coves.) at least partly within the parish.

- Saint John River
  - Coac Reach
  - Nackawic Bend
  - Pokiok Reach
- Little Pokiok Stream
- Pokiok Stream
  - Big Deadwater
- Little Magaguadavic Throughway
- Little Magaguadavic Lake
- Magaguadavic Lake
- more than ten other officially named lakes

== Other notable places ==
Parks, historic sites, and other noteworthy places at least partly within the parish.

- Pokiok Stream Protected Natural Area

== Demographics ==
=== Population ===
Population trend

Census	Population	Change (%)
2016	356	▼4.6%
2011	373	▲1.1%
2006	369	▼6.1%
2001	393	▼5.3%
1996	415	▲4.3%
1991	398	N/A

=== Language ===
Mother tongue (2016)

Language	Population	Pct (%)
English only	335	94.4%
French only	15	4.2%
Both English and French	0	0%
Other languages	5	1.4%

== See also ==
- List of parishes in New Brunswick
