= McAdam Parish, New Brunswick =

McAdam
- Parish
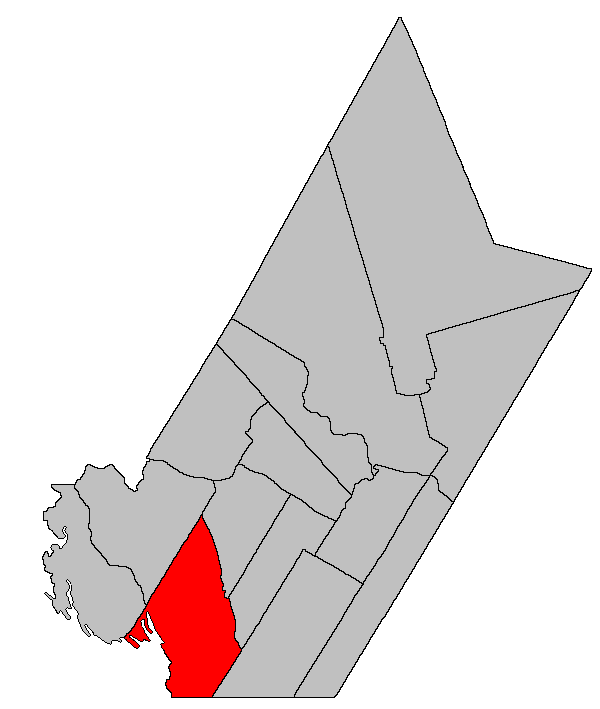
- Location within York County, New Brunswick.
- Coordinates: 45.68°N 67.40°W
- Country: Canada
- Province: New Brunswick
- County: York
- Erected: 1895

Area
  - Land: 534.77 km^{2} (206.48 sq mi)

Population (2021)
  - Total: 61
  - Density: 0.1/km^{2} (0.26/sq mi)
  - Change 2016-2021: ▼16.4%
  - Dwellings: 45
- Time zone: UTC-4 (AST)
  - Summer (DST): UTC-3 (ADT)
- Figures do not include portion within the village of McAdam

McAdam is a geographic parish in York County, New Brunswick, Canada.

Prior to the 2023 governance reform, for governance purposes it was divided between the village of McAdam and the local service district of the parish of McAdam, both of which were members of the Southwest New Brunswick Service Commission (SNBSC).

== Origin of name ==
The parish was named in honour of John McAdam, a timber merchant and politician who died in 1893.

== History ==
McAdam was erected in 1895 from Prince William and Dumfries Parishes.

== Boundaries ==
McAdam Parish is bounded:

- on the northeast by a line beginning at a point about 825 metres east of Moon Pond, then running southeasterly along grant lines, crossing Shogomoc Lake, to the prolongation of the eastern line of large grants to the New Brunswick Railway Company and New Brunswick and Canada Railway and Land Company east of McAdam, then southerly along the railway grants, crossing Magaguadavic Lake, to the railway north of Mink Lake, then running south-southwesterly, south-southeasterly, and southerly, crossing Route 4 to a point about 1 kilometre south of Route 4 and 2.9 kilometres southwest of its junction with Diffen Road;
- on the southeast by a line paralleling the Sunbury County line, as with other parishes south of the Saint John River, striking the Charlotte County line about 3 kilometres east of Route 630;
- on the south by the Charlotte County line;
- on the west and southwest by the international border, running through the St. Croix River and Spednic Lake;
- on the northwest by a line beginning west of Sandy Point and running northeasterly, paralleling the southeastern line, to the starting point.

== Communities ==
Communities at least partly within the parish. bold indicates an incorporated municipality; italics indicate a name no longer in official use

- Burpee
- Cottrell
- **McAdam**
- Newcomb
- St. Croix
- Sugar Brook

== Bodies of water ==
Bodies of water (Note: Not including brooks, ponds or coves.) at least partly within the parish.

- Digdeguash River
- St. Croix River
- Canoose Stream
- Diggity Stream
- Shogomoc Stream
- Musquash Flowage
- Magaguadavic Lake
- Palfrey Lake
- Spednic Lake
- more than fifteen other officially named lakes

== Islands ==
Islands at least partly within the parish.

- Bells Island
- Ben Beaches Island
- Big Island
- Cummings Island
- Estys Island
- Hardwood Island
- Lindsay Island
- Little Indian Island
- Long Island
- Luffs Island
- O'Malleys Island
- Parker Island
- Star Island
- Todds Island
- Varney Island
- Whites Island
- Williams Island
- Works Island

== Other notable places ==
Parks, historic sites, and other noteworthy places at least partly within the parish.

- Spednic Lake Protected Natural Area

== Demographics ==
Parish population total does not include village of McAdam

=== Population ===
Population trend

Census	Population	Change (%)
2016	73	▲170.4%*
2011	27	▼66.3%*
2006	80	▼9.1%
2001	88	▼17.0%
1996	106	▼13.8%
1991	123	N/A

- The net change from 2006 to 2016 (80 people to 73) is a decline of 8.75%

=== Language ===
Mother tongue (2016)

Language	Population	Pct (%)
English only	70	93.3%
French only	0	0%
Both English and French	0	0%
Other languages	5	6.7%

== Access Routes ==
Highways and numbered routes that run through the parish, including external routes that start or finish at the parish limits:

- **Highways**
  - Route 4
- **Principal Routes**
  - None
- Secondary Routes:
  - None
- External Routes:
  - None

== See also ==
- List of parishes in New Brunswick
