= Ernest W. Stairs =

Canadian politician

Ernest Whitfield Stairs
- Born: April 10, 1873; Southampton, New Brunswick; Canada
- Died: October 31, 1941 (aged 68); Southampton, New Brunswick; Canada
- Resting place: Otis Cemetery; Lr. Southampton, N.B.
- Education: Public school
- Occupations: Farmer, Politician
- Political party: Liberal
- Spouse: Christina Augusta Fox
- Children: Albina Reeva, Ruby Violet, Edith Blanche, Nelda Bertha
- Parent(s): Gideon Ludlow Stairs & Melvina A. Bates

Ernest Whitfield Stairs (10 April 1873 – 31 October 1941) was a Canadian farmer and politician. He was born in Southampton, New Brunswick, a descendant of United Empire Loyalists who settled the area in 1784. A successful farmer, Stairs was involved in a variety of public and social activities. He was a director of the Farmers Co-Operative Association and served on the Municipal Council Board for York County from 1911–1921 and served as Warden in 1916.

Stairs was the unsuccessful Liberal Party of Canada candidate for the House of Commons of Canada in the 1921 York-Sunbury riding Federal by-election. Encouraged to run in the 1935 New Brunswick general election by Liberal Party leader Allison Dysart, Stairs was elected to the 38th New Brunswick Legislative Assembly as the York County representative. He served in the Legislative Assembly at Fredericton until 1939.

Stairs died at his home in 1941.

His daughter, Nelda (1905–1993), married Harry A. Corey who was elected the Liberal member of the Provincial Legislature for Stairs' York County riding in 1944. Corey served two terms through 1952 then was elected President of the New Brunswick Liberal Association, serving from 1952 to 1958.

== Sources ==
- Library of Parliament - riding history for York-Sunbury 1917-1987
- Legislative Assembly of New Brunswick

Legislative Assembly of New Brunswick
Preceded by James K. Pinder	MLA for York County; 1935-1939	Succeeded by Charles Price
