= Deborah Joy =

Deborah Joy may refer to:

- Deborah Joy Cheetham (born 1964), Aboriginal Australian soprano, actor, composer and playwright
- Deborah Joy Corey (born 1958), Canadian writer
- Deborah Joy LeVine, American television writer and producer
