= New Brunswick Route 565 =

Highway in New Brunswick, Canada

Coordinates: 46.574439°N 67.613811°W

Route 565

Route information
- Maintained by New Brunswick Department of Transportation

Major junctions
- North end: Route 105 in Upper Kent
- South end: Route 105 in Bath

Location
- Country: Canada
- Province: New Brunswick

Highway system
- Provincial highways in New Brunswick; Former routes
← Route 560	→ Route 570

Route 565 is a 19.7-kilometre (12.2 mi) long north–south looping secondary highway in the western portion of New Brunswick, Canada.

The route starts at Route 105 in Upper Kent on the west bank of the Saint John River. The road travels east through a mostly forested area past Maplehurst and Moose Mountain Lake before turning south and passing by Halls Corner, Holmesville, and Johnsville. The road passes through Giberson Settlement where it begins to slowly turn southwest. As the road enters the community of Bath, it is known as Mechanic Street. Route 565 ends at Route 105 in Bath.
