= Harry A. Corey =

Canadian politician (1901–1989)

Member of Legislative Assembly of New Brunswick
- In office 1944–1952

Personal details
- Born: Harry Allen Corey; March 12, 1901 Temperance Vale, New Brunswick, Canada
- Died: January 20, 1989 (aged 87) Harvey Station, New Brunswick, Canada
- Resting place: Cherry Mountain Cemetery; Harvey Station, New Brunswick, Canada
- Political party: Liberal
- Spouse: Nelda B. Stairs
- Children: 3
- Occupation: Lumber businessman; real estate; politician

Harry Allen Corey (March 12, 1901– January 20, 1989) was a Canadian entrepreneur and politician. He was a member of the Legislative Assembly of New Brunswick.

== Early life and family ==
Harry Allen Corey was born in Temperance Vale, New Brunswick, to Maude (née MacFarlane) and Allen Corey.

Corey married Nelda B. Stairs, daughter of Ernest W. Stairs, in 1924. They had three sons, Ronald, Ersel and Alton.

== Career ==
In the 1920s, Corey worked as a laborer in the forest industry. He first worked in forestry in his home area in northern York County before settling in Millinocket, Maine, where Great Northern Paper Company owned vast timberlands and operated the second largest newsprint mill in the state. His wife Nelda played an active role in the creation and development of the family's lumber business which led the couple to the small community of Harvey, New Brunswick He moved to Harvey Station in 1934 and bought forest holdings in west-central New Brunswick. He created two companies, the Harry A. Corey Ltd. and Corey Development Ltd., and ran them as president. His first contract was with Penobscott Lumbering Company of Maine. In the 1940s, the business employed between 500 and 600 men and 125 hired trucks. The business's office was in Harvey Station, New Brunswick. His sons Ersel, Alton and Ronald worked with him. He also operated a sawmill in Pinder for over 25 years.

His father-in-law Ernest W. Stairs introduced Corey to politics. He was elected in 1944 and 1948 as a Liberal member representing York County in the Legislative Assembly of New Brunswick. He served as chairman of the forest committee. His party was defeated in the 1952 election. He was president of the New Brunswick Liberal Association from 1953 to 1958. He was president of the Harvey Community Hospital Ltd. from 1955 to 1973 and as president of Harvey Community Improvement Association from 1948 to 1973. He was also president of the Harvey Community Benefit, which held responsibility for the annual Harvey fair.

== Death ==
Corey died on January 20, 1989, aged 87, at Harvey Community Hospital. He was buried in Cherry Mountain Cemetery.

== Antecedents ==
He was a fifth generation descendant of Loyalist Gideon Corey of North Kingston, Washington County, Rhode Island, who came to Canada at the peace in 1783.

He was a fifth generation descendant of Donald MacDonald, native of the Isle of Skye, who migrated to New Brunswick prior to 1790 first settling in the Moncton area and marrying Ann Smith and later moved to New Canaan, Brunswick Parish, in Queens County where he acquired and operated a grist mill and farm.

He was a sixth generation descendant through Ann Smith aforesaid to planters James and Martha Smith who arrived in the Moncton area from Philadelphia in June, 1766, having arranged to take up land granted to a Philadelphia syndicate that included Benjamin Franklin as one of the owners. James Smith is thought to have married Martha in Halifax after he arrived there in 1749 with then-Colonel Cornwallis. After the hostilities with the French ended in 1760, he was released from further duty, and he and his family hitched a ride on a British transport or supply ship headed to the British headquarters in Philadelphia. He was living there when this Moncton opportunity appeared. He was a third cousin once removed to Richard Chapman Weldon QC, PhD (Harvard), MP, Albert County Politician and co-founder and first dean of Dalhousie Law School in Halifax through his great-great-grandmother Ann Smith whose sister Martha Smith married John Geldart and in time became great-grandparents of Dean Weldon.

Preceded by Percy Burchill; 1941-1953	New Brunswick Liberal Party President; 1953–1959	Succeeded by Wesley Stuart; 1960-1963

Legislative Assembly of New Brunswick
Preceded by Ford Messer	MLA for York County; 1944-1952	Succeeded by Harry Ames
