= New Brunswick Route 616 =

Highway in New Brunswick, Canada

Coordinates: 46.017469°N 66.910858°W

Route 616

Route information
- Maintained by New Brunswick Department of Transportation
- Length: 13 km (8.1 mi)

Major junctions
- North end: Route 104 between Morehouse Corner and Zealand
- South end: Route 105 in McKeens Corner

Location
- Country: Canada
- Province: New Brunswick

Highway system
- Provincial highways in New Brunswick; Former routes
← Route 615	→ Route 617

Route 616 is a 13.1-kilometre (8.1 mi) long mostly north–south secondary highway in the eastern portion of New Brunswick, Canada.

The route starts at Route 104 between Morehouse Corner and Zealand where it travels mostly northeast past Zealand. It crosses over the Mactaquac Basin before passing Tripp Settlement. The road travels through Keswick Ridge and past Mactaquac Heights before ending at Route 105 in McKeens Corner on the north bank of the Saint John River close to the Mactaquac Dam.
