= New Brunswick Route 580 =

Highway in New Brunswick, Canada

Coordinates: 46.416086°N 67.408676°W

Route 580

Route information
- Maintained by New Brunswick Department of Transportation
- Length: 15.1 km (9.4 mi)

Major junctions
- North end: Route 107 in Glassville
- South end: Route 104 in Lower Windsor

Location
- Country: Canada
- Province: New Brunswick

Highway system
- Provincial highways in New Brunswick; Former routes
← Route 575	→ Route 585

Route 580 is a 15-kilometre-long (9.3 mi) north–south secondary highway in the eastern portion of Carleton County, New Brunswick, Canada.

The route starts at Route 107 in Glassville. The road travels south through a mostly forested area through Esdraelon and Windsor before ending at Route 104 in Lower Windsor.
