= Temperance Vale, New Brunswick =

Community in York County, New Brunswick, Canada

Coordinates: 46.0741°N 67.2560°W

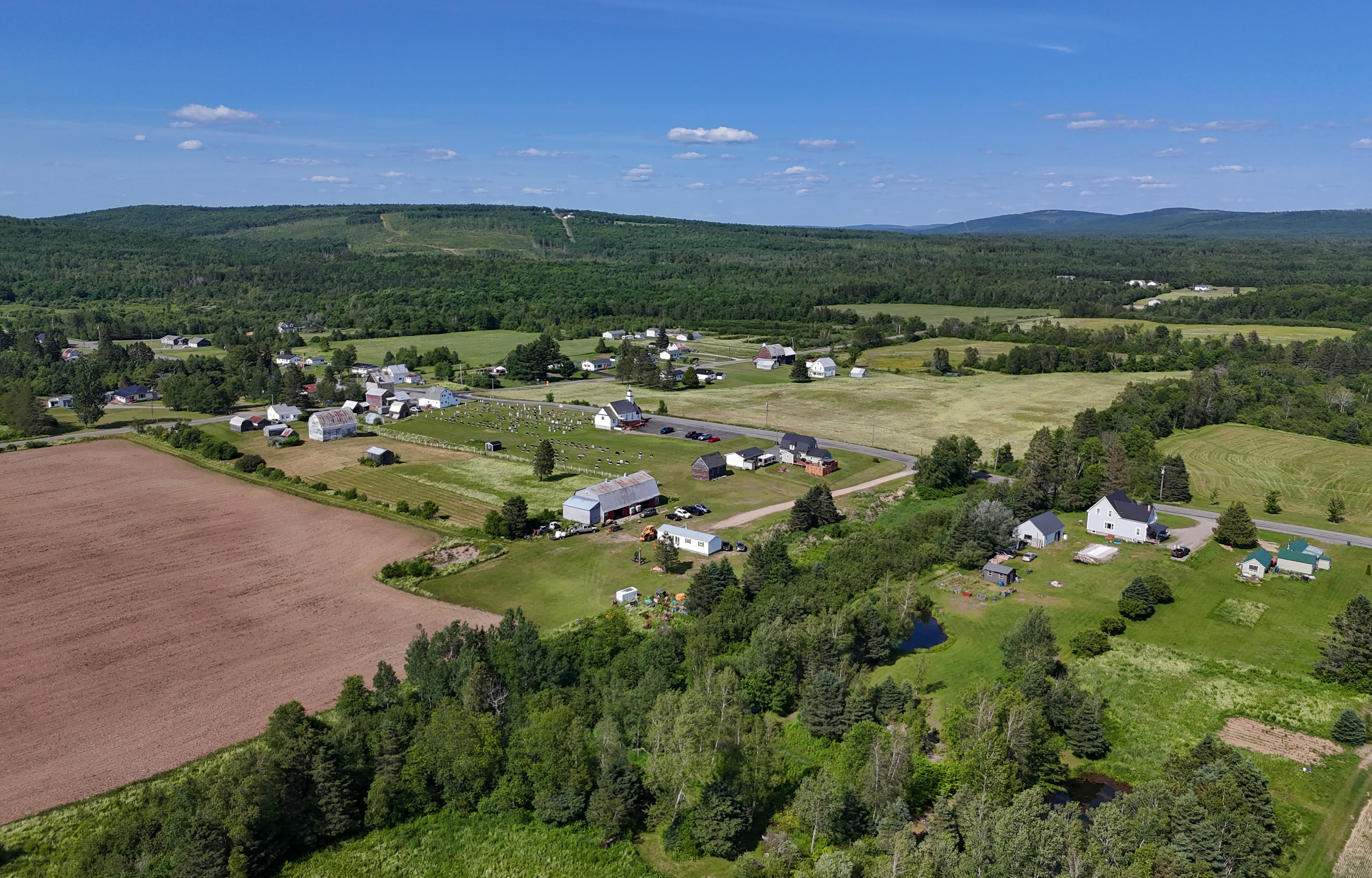

Temperance Vale is a community in York County, New Brunswick, Canada on Route 595.

== History ==
A farming and logging area, it was first settled c. 1860 by children of the United Empire Loyalist families who came to Queensbury, New Brunswick in 1784. The 2006 Canadian Census found a population of 380.

Published in 1987, Temperance Vale - The People and Times of a New Brunswick (Canada) Settlement is a history compiled and written by community members.

A late 19th-century settler was James K. Pinder. The adjacent settlement of Pinder, New Brunswick is named for him. He built and operated a successful lumber mill later owned by Harry A. Corey. Another former resident of note who was born here, is award-winning author Deborah Joy Corey.

== See also ==
- List of communities in New Brunswick
