= New Brunswick Route 590 =

Highway in New Brunswick, Canada

Coordinates: 46.137025°N 67.381897°W

Route 590

Route information
- Maintained by New Brunswick Department of Transportation
- Length: 10.8 km (6.7 mi)

Major junctions
- North end: Route 130 in Waterville
- South end: Route 560 in Jacksonville

Location
- Country: Canada
- Province: New Brunswick

Highway system
- Provincial highways in New Brunswick; Former routes
← Route 585	→ Route 595

Route 590 is an 11-kilometre (6.8 mi) long north–south secondary highway in the eastern portion of New Brunswick, Canada.

The route starts at Route 130 north of Waterville east of Exit 172 of the Trans Canada Highway. The road travels south through Waterville and Lower Waterville, along a former Trans-Canada alignment, before continuing southeast through a mostly agricultural area to end at Route 560 in Jacksonville.
