= Glassville, New Brunswick =

Coordinates: 46.483°N 67.417°W

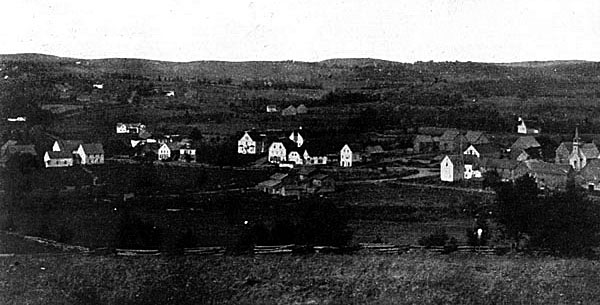
Panoramic view of Glassville, ca. 1910 - 1912

Location of Glassvile in New Brunswick

Glassville is a community in the Canadian province of New Brunswick located mainly at the intersection of Route 107 and Route 580. It is situated in Aberdeen, a parish of Carleton County.

== History ==
The community takes its name from Charles Gordon Glass, a minister who led his Scottish followers to the area in 1861.

== Demographics ==
In the 2021 Census of Population conducted by Statistics Canada, Glassville had a population of 77 living in 37 of its 43 total private dwellings, a change of 22.2% from its 2016 population of 63. With a land area of 0.56 km^{2} (0.22 sq mi), it had a population density of 137.5/km^{2} (356.1/sq mi) in 2021.

== See also ==
- List of communities in New Brunswick
