= New Brunswick Route 575 =

Highway in New Brunswick, Canada

Coordinates: 46.285749°N 67.428589°W

Route 575

Route information
- Maintained by New Brunswick Department of Transportation
- Length: 14.6 km (9.1 mi)

Major junctions
- East end: Route 105 in Hartland
- West end: Route 104 in Cloverdale

Location
- Country: Canada
- Province: New Brunswick

Highway system
- Provincial highways in New Brunswick; Former routes
← Route 570	→ Route 580

Route 575 is a 15-kilometre (9.3 mi) long east–west secondary highway in the western portion of New Brunswick, Canada.

The route starts at Route 105 in Hartland near Lower Becaguimec Island. The road travels east through a mostly forested area through Pole Hill, where it crosses the South Branch Becaguimec Stream. It then ends at Route 104 in Cloverdale.
