= New Brunswick Route 104 =

Highway in New Brunswick, Canada

Route 104

Route information
- Maintained by New Brunswick Department of Transportation
- Length: 82.76 km (51.42 mi)
- Existed: 1965–present

Major junctions
- West end: Route 130 in Lower Brighton
- East end: Route 105 in Mouth of Keswick

Location
- Country: Canada
- Province: New Brunswick
- Major cities: Coldstream, Nackawic-Millville, Burtts Corner Zealand

Highway system
- Provincial highways in New Brunswick; Former routes
← Route 103	→ Route 105

Route 104 is a highway in New Brunswick, Canada, running from an intersection with Route 130 near Hartland to an intersection with Route 105 at Mouth of Keswick (near Fredericton), a distance of 83 kilometres.

From Hartland, Route 104 follows the Becaguimec Stream to the north traveling east through the communities of Coldstream at the south terminus of Route 570, Lower Windsor at the south terminus of Route 580 before turning south east. The road travels through Carlisle and Cloverdale, the east terminus of Route 575, turning southeast through uninhabited forest land through the villages of Maplewood, Hawkins Corner at Route 585, Nackawic-Millville past the north-east terminus of Route 605. The road continues east through Hainesville past the north-east terminus of Route 610, Greenhill, and past the Crabbe Mountain ski hill, Brewers Mills, Morehouse Corner, past the north terminus of Route 616 to the rural community of Zealand. Route 104 then follows the Keswick River, crossing it at Burtts Corner at the south terminus of Route 617, turning south to follow the river's east bank to its end at Mouth of Keswick though Pughs Crossing, ending at Keswick.

== See also ==
- List of New Brunswick provincial highways
