= New Brunswick Route 585 =

Highway in New Brunswick, Canada

Coordinates: 46.137025°N 67.381897°W

Route 585

Route information
- Maintained by New Brunswick Department of Transportation
- Length: 32.7 km (20.3 mi)

Major junctions
- North end: Route 103 in Woodstock
- South end: Route 104 in Hawkins Corner

Location
- Country: Canada
- Province: New Brunswick

Highway system
- Provincial highways in New Brunswick; Former routes
← Route 580	→ Route 590

Route 585 is a 33-kilometre (21 mi) long east–west secondary highway in the eastern portion of New Brunswick, Canada.

The route starts at Route 103 in Woodstock. The road travels southeast crossing the Grafton Bridge over the Saint John River before crossing Route 105 in Grafton. Continuing, the road passes the Woodstock Airport before continuing east through a mostly forested area to Newbridge and East Newbridge. In Harten Corner, Route 585 intersects with the northern terminus of Route 595. The road continues through Clarkville and crosses the Nackawic River into Nortondale where it changes direction. It now travels northeast through Woodstock Road before it ends at Route 104 in Hawkins Corner.
