= Bear Island (New Brunswick) =

Bear Island, New Brunswick
- Name Place
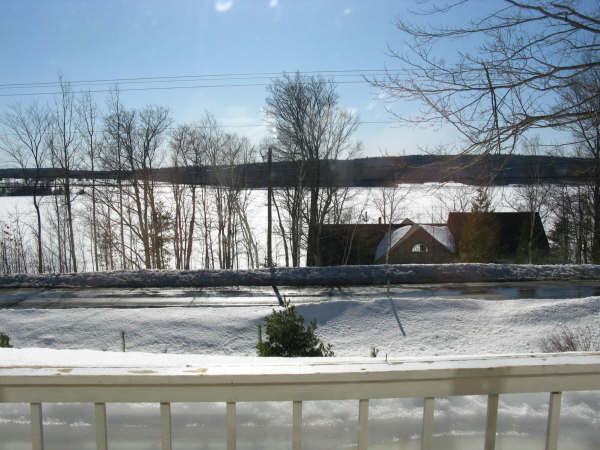
- View From Bear Island
- Mottoes: 1787-1800: Fortune Favours the Bold; 1800-1967: More Than An Island
- Location within New Brunswick Location within Canada
- Coordinates: 45°55′18″N 67°01′35″W
- Country: Canada
- Province: New Brunswick
- County: York
- Parish: Queensbury Parish
- Established: February 2, 1787
- Time zone: UTC-04:00 (AST)
  - Summer (DST): UTC-03:00 (ADT)
- Postal Code: E6L
- Area code: 506

Bear Island is a Name Place in Queensbury Parish, New Brunswick, Canada, located on the north shore of the Saint John River.

== History ==
Named "Island of the Bear" by the Wolastoqiyik, the location takes its name from islands (Big Bear and the Little Bear Islands) in the Saint John River. One story claims that bears fished in the narrow channels between the islands, while others claim that bears would frequent the butternut trees native to the islands. With the development of the downstream Mactaquac Dam in 1968 and the consequential rise in water levels, Bear Island is technically a misnomer, as the islands no longer exist, and the entire area referred to as Bear Island is on the shore of the dam's 96-kilometre headpond. Many of the area's homes were razed in order to make way for the headpond.

The first permanent settlement in Bear Island was by Revolutionary War Loyalist veterans who received minimum 200-acre (0.81 km^{2}) land grants by King George III on February 2, 1787, with many soldiers arriving that spring. Twelve veterans from the "Guides and Pioneers, Queensbury" and twenty-one from the "Corps of Queen's Rangers" regiments were granted land. Eventually immigrants from Portugal, England, Ireland, the Netherlands, Scotland, France and Germany, and families of former slaves of African descent would find their way to Bear Island.

The island itself was originally divided into 26 lots owned by settlers on the shore. Due to flooding in the spring, the island was never permanently settled, but rather used for farming purposes enhanced by the rich soil deposited after each flood. Other islands in the area were used similarly.

Originally a farming community, each resident grew vegetables and raised cattle, pigs, hens and horses. Although subsistent in nature, occasionally farming activities would grow into a true industry, such as during the Potato Boom of the late 1920s when residents harvested up to 100 barrels a season for sale. Other residents took up maple syrup production, even forming the first Maple Syrup Association in New Brunswick in 1959, while others chose to specialize in matters like chicken hatcheries and milk production. Many of these activities as a source of primary income and lifestyle ceased with the destruction of most of the arable land with the advent of the dam.

== Geography and climate ==
Bear Island stretches along the north side of the Saint John River, with Granite Hill to the north and Lower Queensbury to the south. Weather stations in nearby Fredericton record an average of 1,093 mm of precipitation each year, including 241 cm of snow. Geographic landmarks include Howland Falls, an 11-meter, tiered waterfall.

== Industry ==
Primary industries include agriculture (i.e. sugar maple farms, Goodines Poultry Farm, Squires Family Christmas Tree Farm) and tourism (Great Bear Campground & Sugarbush). As inhabitants of a rural community with limited employment opportunities, many residents are self-employed, running their own business. These businesses provide such varied services as music lessons, landscaping and maid services. Bear Island is also home to the founder of Fredericton's PsInnovations Clinical Practice Solutions which offers virtual support services to professionals in the psychology field.

== Infrastructure ==
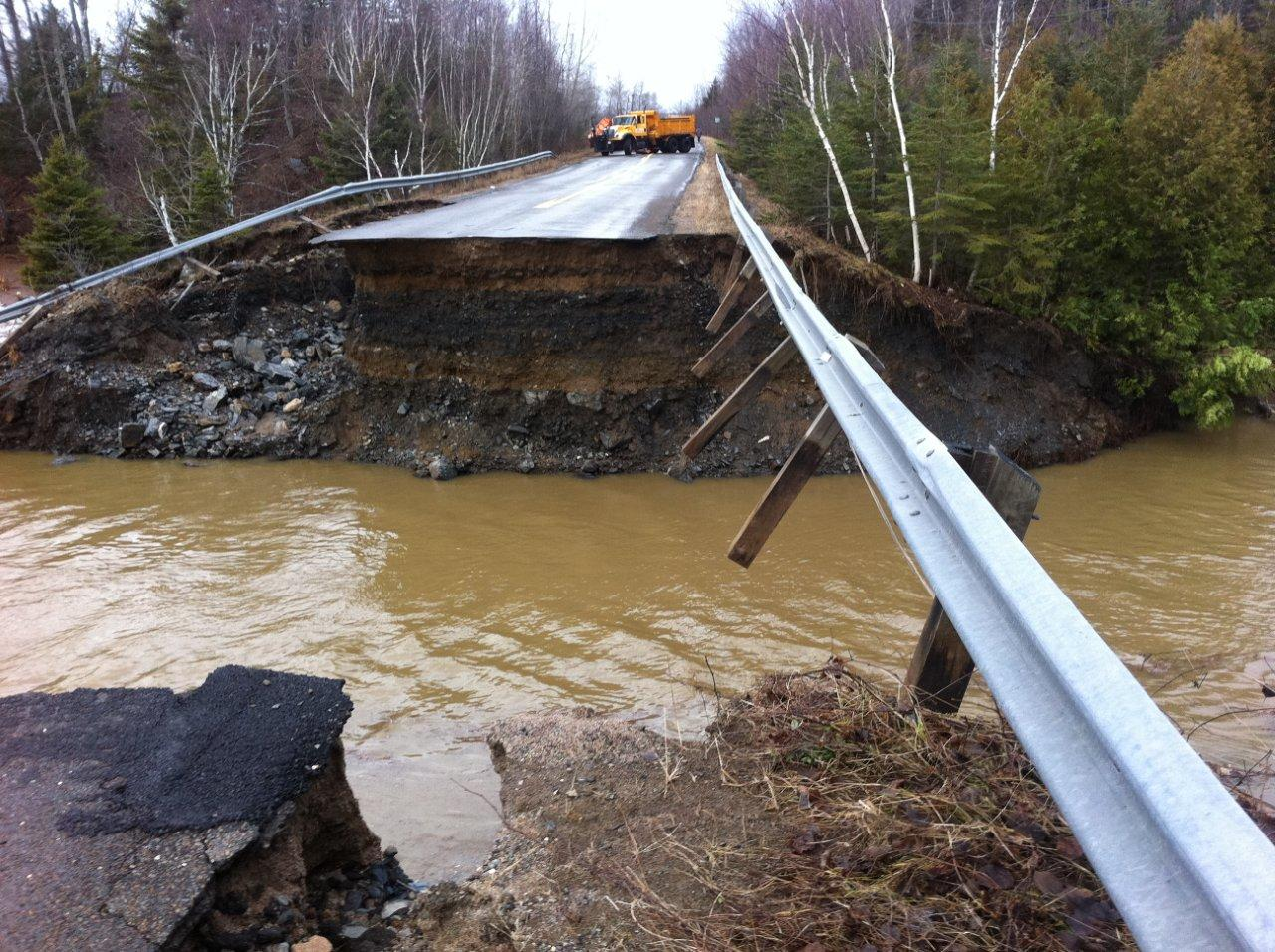
Route 105 storm damage (December 2010)

The primary road through Bear Island is Route 105. Although roads in neighbouring communities are regarded as poor, often resulting in damage to local vehicles, Route 105 is respected as of a better quality. However, the community's heavy reliance on Route 105 as its main artery into Fredericton can be problematic, such as after heavy rain in December 2010 caused a portion of the route to wash away. Although many communities to the north do not have cell phone coverage, Bear Island's proximity to Highway 2 and its towers gives it full cell phone coverage. The area is served by highspeed fixed WiFi and satellite services through Xplornet ISP.

== Culture ==
A close knit community with local events such as dances at the area community centre, Bear Island also lends its name to the Bear Island Boatworks, which built the Spirit of Canada, an open 40-foot (12 m) sailboat, launched September 22, 2001, and used by Derek Hatfield, an award-winning sailor and one of only two Canadian men to race around the world.

== See also ==
- List of islands of New Brunswick
- List of communities in New Brunswick
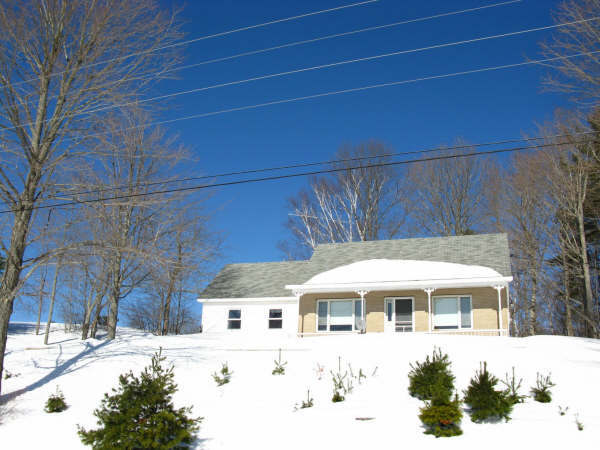
  A home in Bear Island
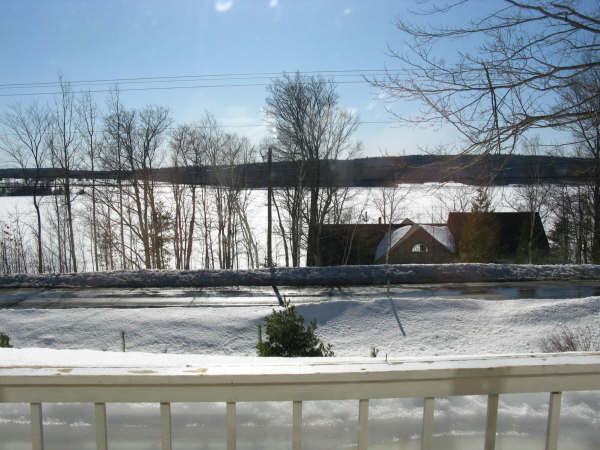
  View of the water from Bear Island
