= Pinder, New Brunswick =

Canadian community in York County, New Brunswick

Coordinates: 46°3′N 67°14′W

Location of Pinder in New Brunswick

Pinder is a Canadian community in York County, New Brunswick at the intersection of Route 595 and Route 605 on the Nackawic River.

It is adjacent to the community of Temperance Vale and was named for sawmill owner and member of the Legislative Assembly of New Brunswick, James K. Pinder. It is located 5.71 km NNE of Nackawic.

A post office was established here in 1912, which was removed in 1938. It also had a Canadian Pacific Railway station.

Officially, it is part of Temperance Vale.

== History ==
The Pinder Falls & Dam are one of the Waterfalls of New Brunswick.

== See also ==
- List of communities in New Brunswick
