= New Brunswick Route 595 =

Highway in New Brunswick, Canada

Coordinates: 46.082281°N 67.351685°W

Route 595

Route information
- Maintained by New Brunswick Department of Transportation
- Length: 21 km (13 mi)

Major junctions
- North end: Route 585 in Harten Corner
- South end: Route 605 in Pinder

Location
- Country: Canada
- Province: New Brunswick

Highway system
- Provincial highways in New Brunswick; Former routes
← Route 590	→ Route 605

Route 595 is a 21-kilometre (13 mi) long north–south secondary highway in the eastern portion of New Brunswick, Canada.

The route starts at Route 585 in Harten Corner east of the town of Woodstock. The road travels southeast past Bull Lake and through the community of Bull Lake. The road continues through West Waterville, Central Waterville and Temperance Vale. It crosses the Nackawic River before ending at Route 605 in Pinder.
