= Keswick Ridge, New Brunswick =

Coordinates: 45.995888°N 66.887169°W

Keswick Ridge (2011 population: 1,526 ) is a Canadian rural community in York County, New Brunswick on Route 616.

The former local service district of Keswick Ridge took its name from the community.

== History ==
First settled by the sons and daughters of the Loyalists from Massachusetts, the community still maintains its Loyalist roots.

It is located on the east bank of the Saint John River 20 kilometres upstream from the city of Fredericton, occupying a ridge between the Keswick River and Mactaquac Headpond. Mixed farming and small local business is the major source of income in the area.

"The Ridge" or "God's Country", as it is referred to by locals, is best known for its bucolic scenery, and apple growing.

Route 616 which runs through Keswick Ridge was voted in a CAA survey as Atlantic Canada 9th Worst Roads for 2017, as well as Top Worst Roads for 2018

== Demographics ==
In the 2021 Census of Population conducted by Statistics Canada, Keswick Ridge had a population of 1,643 living in 618 of its 642 total private dwellings, a change of -0.5% from its 2016 population of 1,652. With a land area of 55.16 km^{2} (21.30 sq mi), it had a population density of 29.8/km^{2} (77.1/sq mi) in 2021.

== Education ==
Keswick Ridge School features a school (KRS) offering multi-age classrooms from kindergarten to grade 8. The school used to be used as a high school but now the high school students are bused into Fredericton High School. The sports teams are known as Keswick Ridge Raiders.

== Notable people ==
Dec 1, 2014 - It was announced today that Deborah and Delbert Munn were joint winners of Canada's November 28/2014 Lotto Max Draw. Their winnings $25 million, in the split draw were approximately $12.5 Million.

In December 2016, local Keswick Ridge farmer Andrew Lovell was honoured as Canada's Outstanding Young Farmer.

== See also ==
- List of communities in New Brunswick
