= Pokiok, New Brunswick =

Coordinates: 45.950000°N 67.250000°W

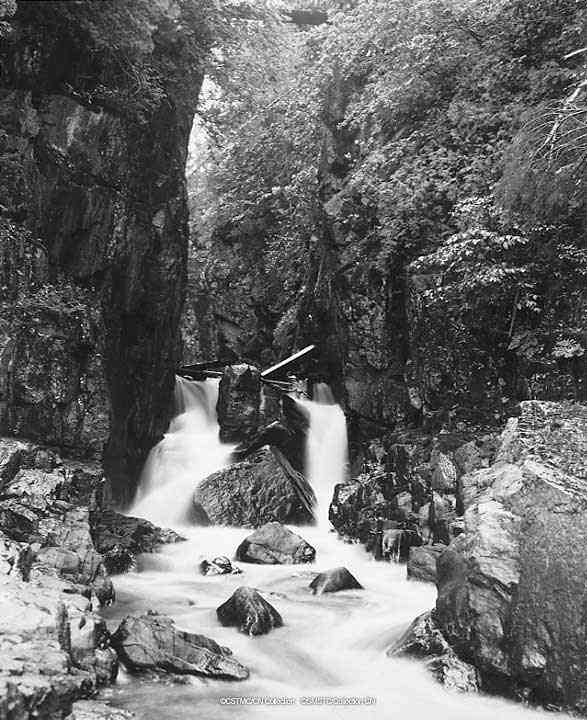
Pokiok Falls, early 1900s

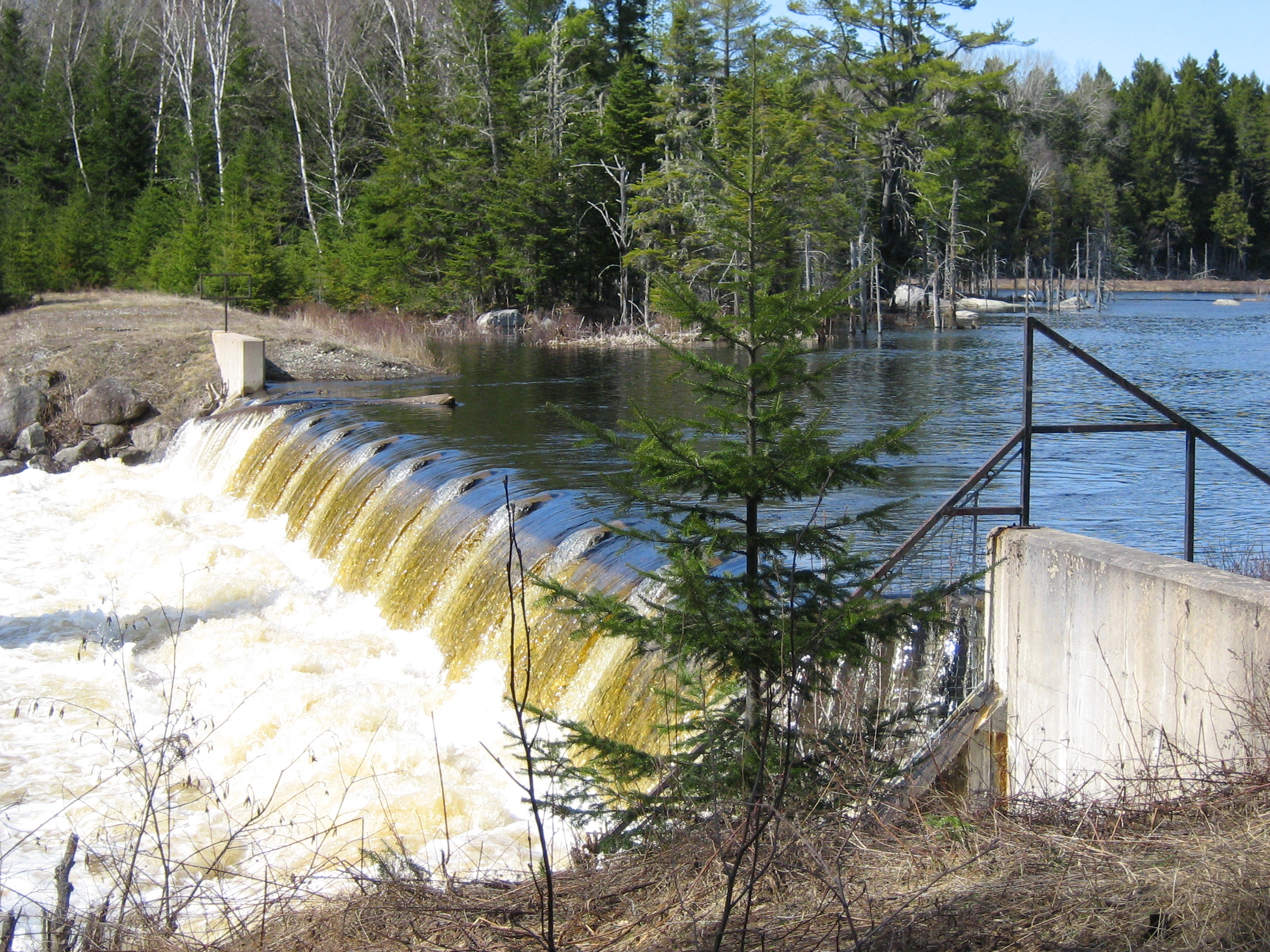
Ducks Unlimited Dam on the Pokiok Stream

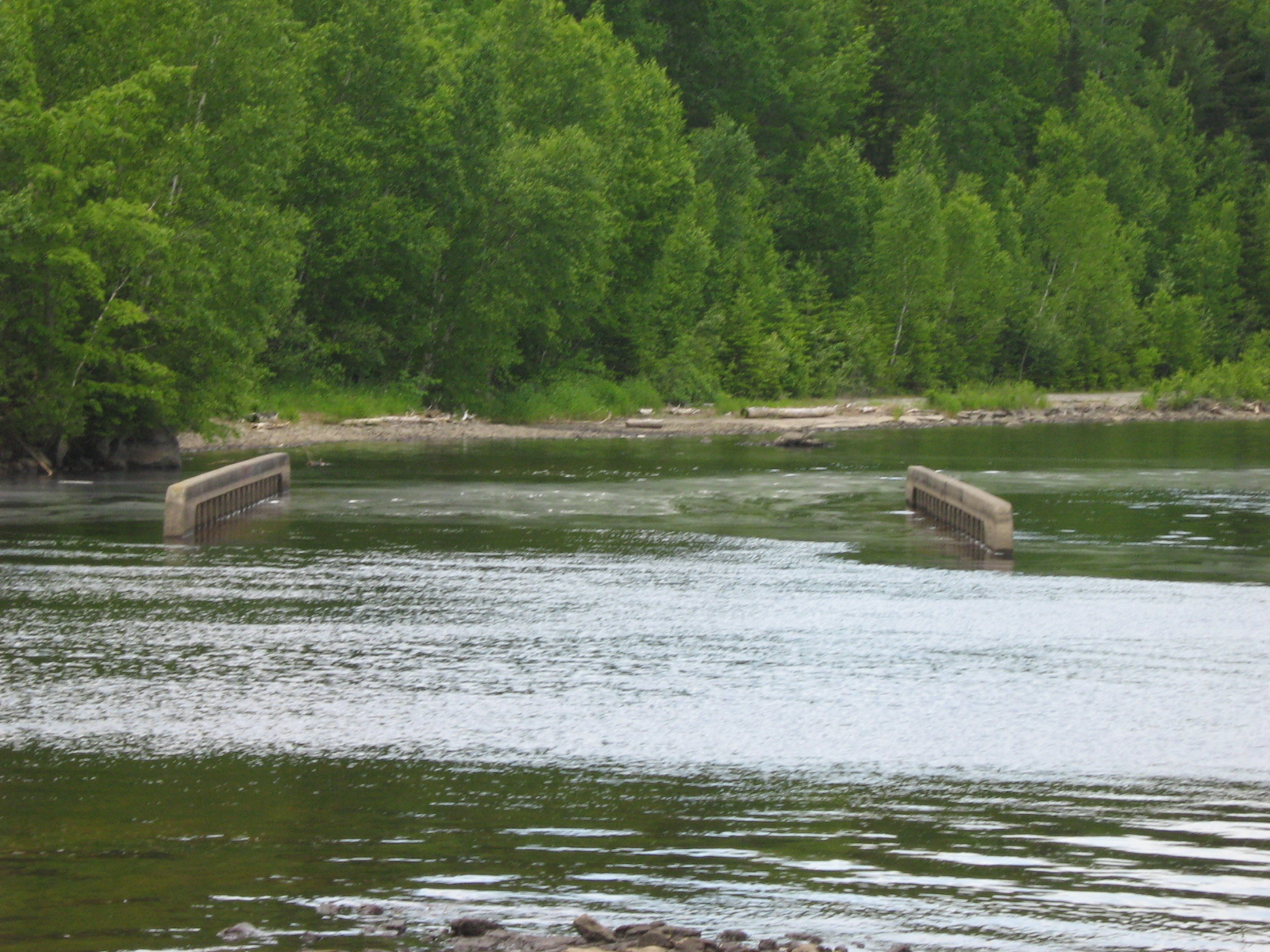
Shogomac Stream Bridge

Pokiok is a rural community in York County, New Brunswick, Canada.

Situated on the west bank of the Saint John River, 60 kilometres (37 mi) west of Fredericton, and 5 kilometres (3.1 mi) west of Nackawic-Millville, the community is home to the Pokiok Falls, which were created by the Pokiok Stream emptying over a ledge into the Saint John River. The Pokiok Falls were a local tourist attraction until construction of the Mactaquac Dam in 1967 saw them flooded by the rising reservoir.

In early spring the reservoir water level is lowered to prevent flooding from spring runoff. During this time you can see part of the Pokiok gorge where the falls once ran.

Previous spelling—Poquiock.

== See also ==
- List of communities in New Brunswick
