= Upper Queensbury, New Brunswick =

Coordinates: 45.988°N 67.193°W

Location of Upper Queensbury in New Brunswick

Upper Queensbury is a settlement in New Brunswick at the intersection of Route 105 and the southern terminus of Route 610 on the north bank of the Saint John River.

== See also ==
- List of communities in New Brunswick
