= Burtts Corner =

Coordinates: 46.067667°N 66.873361°W

Location of Burtts Corner in New Brunswick

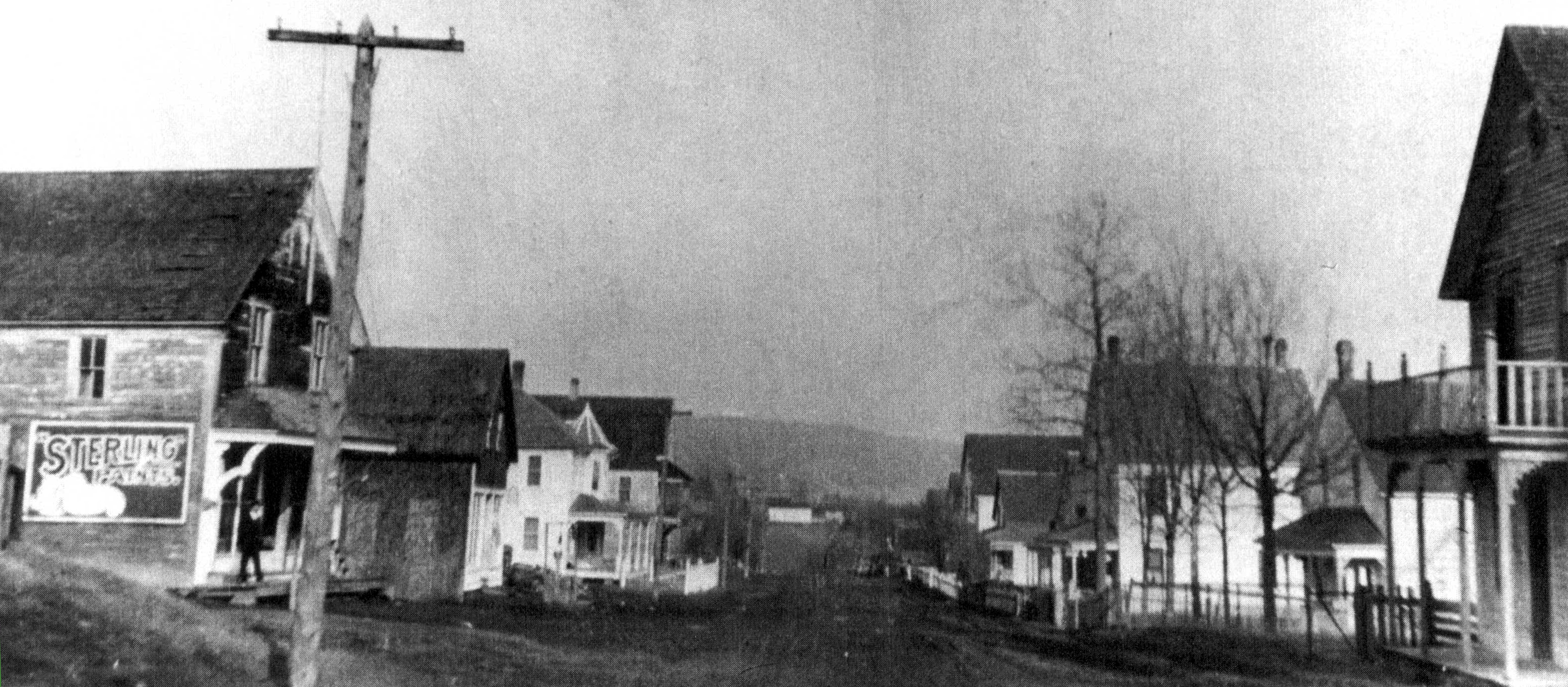
Burtt's Corner, New Brunswick, by Dr. O. E. Morehouse, 1905.

Burtts Corner is a Canadian rural community in Douglas Parish, York County, New Brunswick. It is located on the Keswick River, a tributary of the Saint John River, between the communities of Keswick and Zealand at the intersection of Route 104 and Route 617.

== History ==
Burtts Corner was originally known as Smiths Corner for J.E. Smith who kept a store at the corner there.

In 1819, Benjamin Burtt married Elizabeth Crouse, the daughter of Loyalist Philip Crouse, and they settled six kilometers from the mouth of the Keswick River in Smiths Corner.

Their son, Benjamin R. Burtt, opened the first Burtt's Store in the community between 1861 and 1871. In the store's early days, customers would often trade eggs for groceries. Later, he expanded his store and included a post office. In the 1880s the nearby railroad changed from narrow to standard gauge, lowering shipping costs thereby making local timber product sales increase. Railroad stations became established as access points to the local communities. Sometimes these community access points were quite a distance from the established community centers. Cardigan Station was established in Smiths Corner from the influence of the nearby Cardigan Settlement some 16 kilometers away.

By the 1890s, Elwood Burtt—Benjamin and Elizabeth (Crouse) Burtt's grandson—had taken over the Burtt's Store and opened his own storefront in the village. He also owned what became the town's biggest employer, Burtt's Sawmill, which employed up to sixty men.

By taking over the Burtt's Store business, Elwood naturally took over the responsibility of the local post office. Running the post office was a profitable endeavor because it brought people into his store. In 1893, when the Canadian government was formally organizing a nationwide postal system, Elwood Burtt arranged for his Burtt's Store to be selected as the official post office location for the community and, more importantly, for himself to be the official postmaster.

At this time, the rapidly growing community was commonly called Cardigan Station, but this resulted in confusion with the mail destined for the community of Cardigan. The community needed a more distinctive name, and Elwood Burtt was in the perfect position to influence the choice. Burtt's Store (for over 30 years) and Burtt's Sawmill (for over 20 years) had been in the community. Although other names were proposed, Burtt's Corner was the name that Elwood, as postmaster, helped get officially recognized. By 1898, the community contained two other stores, a hotel, a sawmill and a population of 250.

The last, and generally unpopular, name change took place around 1985 when the town's name was modified by the government. The possessive was dropped, so that Burtt's Corner became Burtts Corner.

== See also ==
- List of communities in New Brunswick
