= Deborah Joy Corey =

Canadian writer

Deborah Joy Corey (born 1958 in Temperance Vale, New Brunswick) is a Canadian writer whose first novel, Losing Eddie won the 1994 Books in Canada First Novel Award.

The author of numerous articles and stories, Corey's writings have been published in such literary journals as Ploughshares, Carolina Quarterly, Crescent Review, Image, and Grain. Born and raised in Temperance Vale, New Brunswick, Corey now lives with her husband and two daughters, in a small coastal village in Maine, a site she used as a model for the setting for her latest novel, The Skating Pond (2003).

== Bibliography ==
- Losing Eddie - (1993)
- The Skating Pond - (2003)
