= Upper Kent, New Brunswick =

Location of Upper Kent in New Brunswick

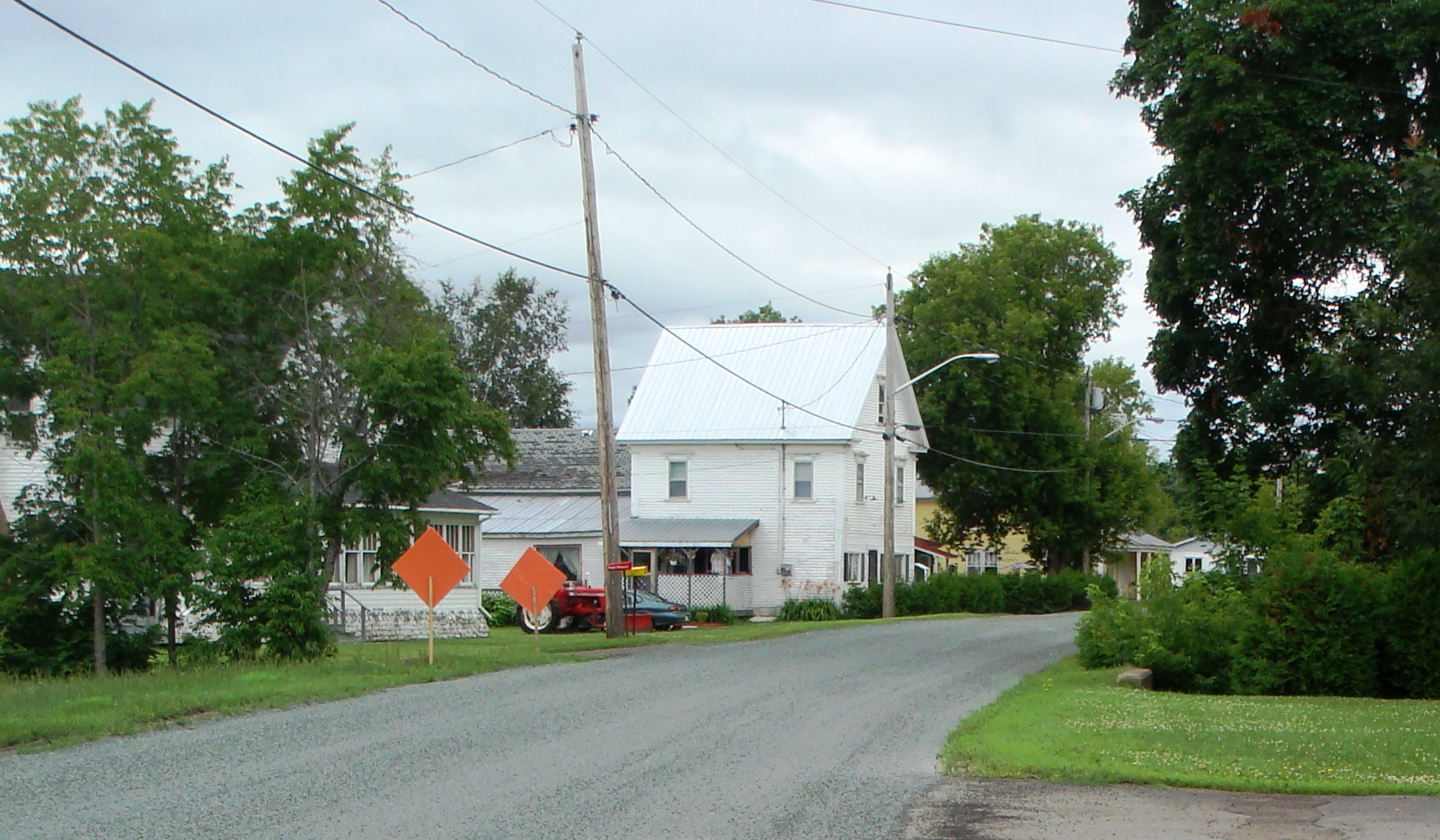
Upper Kent

Upper Kent is a community in Kent Parish, New Brunswick, Canada, with a population of approximately 100.

It is home to the Upper Kent Loon Sanctuary, and is where The Five Mighty Pillars of Irving stretch across the Saint John River.

Upper Kent was once known for its booming trade industry in potatoes and other local crops, which were shipped by rail from the local station. In the 1950s, Upper Kent was the site of three service stations, three churches, a bus stop, restaurant, dry goods store, general store, hotel, blacksmith's shop, an elementary school, a high school, and was serviced by a Saint John River ferry and daily train and bus service. The construction of the Beechwood hydroelectric dam in the mid 1950s, and the flooding of the Beechwood head pond, combined with the relocation of the main highway, resulted in drastic change.

== Demographics ==
In the 2021 Census of Population conducted by Statistics Canada, Upper Kent had a population of 106 living in 48 of its 53 total private dwellings, a change of −33.8% from its 2016 population of 160. With a land area of 0.65 km^{2} (0.25 sq mi), it had a population density of 163.1/km^{2} (422.4/sq mi) in 2021.

== In popular culture ==
The estate of blues/folk/roots musician Lonesome Jim Lawrance is located in Lower Upper Kent, just down river from The Five Mighty Pillars of Irving.
