= Zealand, New Brunswick =

Coordinates: 46.054°N 66.936°W

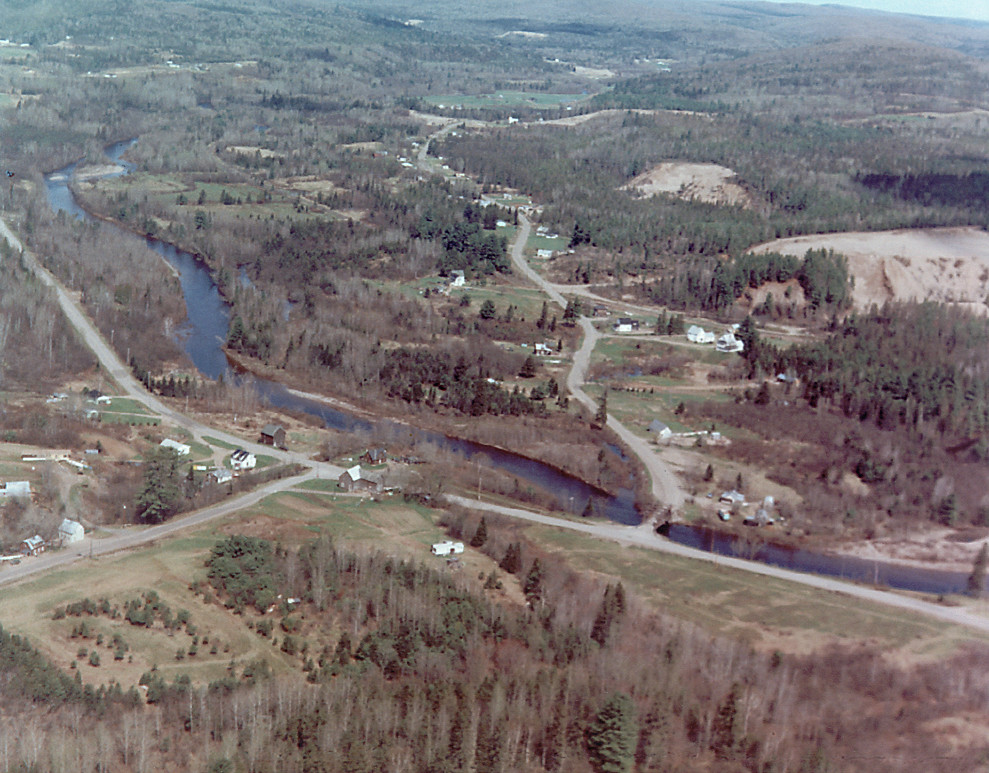
Zealand, New Brunswick (looking north), 1983.

Zealand is a Canadian rural community in York County, New Brunswick close to the intersection of Route 104 and Route 616.

It is located on the Keswick River, a tributary of the Saint John River, between the communities of Burtts Corner and Nackawic-Millville.

== History ==
The community was founded under the name New Zealand, changed to Zealand Station in the late 1800s, and took its current name of Zealand in 1961.

The area was named New Zealand by Gould Crouse, whose Loyalist father Philip, born in Zealand in the Netherlands, came to New Brunswick from North Carolina after the American Revolution.

=== Early Postal Service ===
The first official post office in the community called New Zealand was operated by Thomas Woodworth.

He operated this former way office from July 1, 1868, until his resignation on October 24, 1871. Newly married Darius E. Brewer took over, continuing the post office duties until 1885. Rev. Peter O. Rees took over from Mr. Brewer on August 1, 1885, as the new name for the post office changed from New Zealand to Zealand Station. Mr. Rees maintained this position until April 4, 1899. The final change came in 1961, after several postmasters, when the post office name was officially shortened to Zealand.

=== Railway ===
The New Brunswick Railway was commissioned in 1870, with the section through Zealand completed in 1873.

The system was initially built to narrow gauge, however this was changed to standard gauge in the 1880s. Stations became established as access points to local communities along the route. Sometimes these community access points were quite a distance from the established community centres. The center of the New Zealand community was about one kilometre from the railroad station that served it. The locals that worked for the New Brunswick Railway as section men named the access point Zealand Station. This was readily accepted by the railway, followed almost immediately by the centre of the community shifting toward the economic and social centre growing around the railway station. In short order the community became known as Zealand Station.

After 1961, and with the dwindling influence of the railway, the community name became more widely accepted as Zealand.

== Economy ==
The community has several sand and gravel quarries serving concrete companies. The surrounding forest and rivers offer potential for outdoor recreation and eco-tourism. The community is one of the first rural communities in the province to be wired for broadband Internet.

Following the decision by Canadian Pacific Railway to abandon its line through Zealand in 1993, the rail corridor has been converted to a recreational trail and is also part of the Trans Canada Trail system.

== See also ==
- List of communities in New Brunswick

== Bibliography ==
- Tracy, John C. "John C. Tracy Book" Provincial Archives of New Brunswick, 1927-1932.
- 1851, 1861, 1881, 1891, 1901 and 1911 Douglas and Bright Parish Census Records.
- Zealand Historical Society, Holdings, Zealand, New Brunswick, Canada.
