= Cloverdale, New Brunswick =

Community in New Brunswick, Canada

Coordinates: 46.303167°N 67.360333°W

Location of Cloverdale in New Brunswick

Cloverdale is a community in the Canadian province of New Brunswick located around the intersection of Route 104 and Route 575. It is situated in Brighton, a parish of Carleton County. Settlement dated from 1866. Name possibly descriptive.

== See also ==
- List of communities in New Brunswick
