= Mactaquac Provincial Park =

Provincial park in New Brunswick, Canada

- IUCN category II (national park)
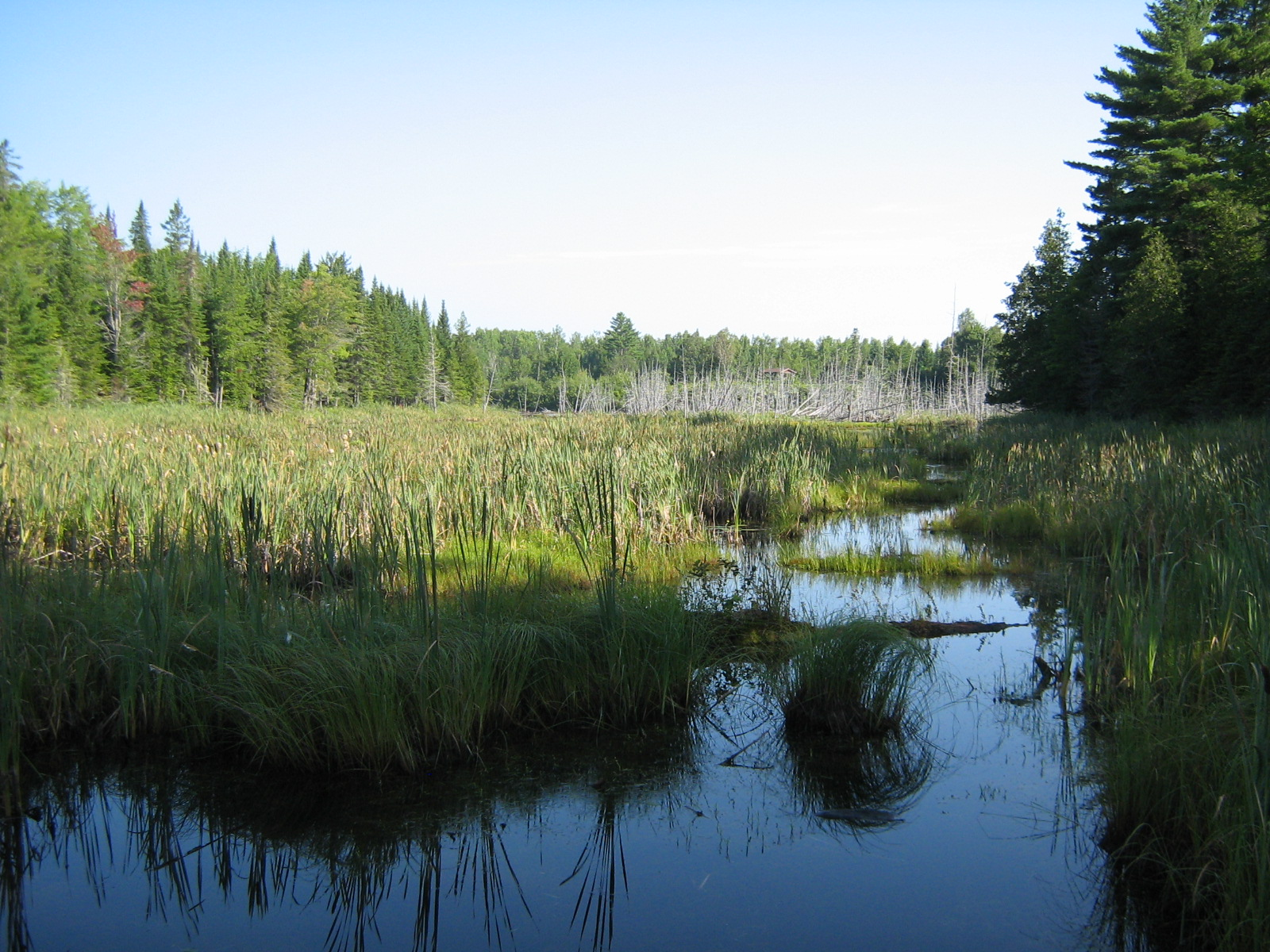
- Beaver pond in Mactaquac Provincial Park
- Interactive map of Mactaquac Provincial Park
- Location: Mactaquac, New Brunswick, Canada
- Nearest city: Fredericton
- Coordinates: 45°57′32.49″N 66°53′33.2″W
- Area: 5.25 square kilometres (2.03 sq mi)
- Established: 1960s
- Visitors: n/a (in 2009)
- Governing body: Government of New Brunswick

Mactaquac Provincial Park is a Canadian provincial park with an area of 5.25 square kilometres (2.03 sq mi). It is located on the Saint John River 15 kilometres west of Fredericton, New Brunswick in the community of Mactaquac.

The park was created in the 1960s during the construction of the Mactaquac Dam. It contains a golf course, campground, two beaches, hiking trails, and cross-country skiing trails in the winter.

== Activities ==
There are activities such as kayaking, hiking, cross-country skiing, swimming and fresh water beaches.
