= Mactaquac, New Brunswick =

Coordinates: 45.954044°N 66.888971°W

Mactaquac is a community in the Canadian province of New Brunswick in York County around the intersection of Route 105 and Route 615.

Mactaquac is home to the Mactaquac Dam, a hydroelectric dam located on the Saint John River. Mactaquac's main sources of recreation are boating, snowmobiling, horseback riding and other outdoor activities. Mactaquac is also the home of the Mactaquac Provincial Park and Treego Mactaquac.

== See also ==
- List of communities in New Brunswick
