= Dumfries, New Brunswick =

Dumfries
- Unincorporated community
- Location of Dumfries, New Brunswick
- Coordinates: 45.965278°N 67.150556°W
- Country: Canada
- Province: New Brunswick
- County: York
- Parish: Dumfries

Government
  - Type: Local service district
- Time zone: UTC-4 (AST)
  - Summer (DST): UTC-3 (ADT)
- Postal code(s): E6G
- Area code: 506

Dumfries is an unincorporated community in York County, New Brunswick, Canada. It is named for Dumfries, Scotland, the original home of Adam Allen, an early settler.

== See also ==
- List of communities in New Brunswick
