= James K. Pinder =

Canadian politician

James Kellway Pinder (March 26, 1841 - April 22, 1929) was an English-born farmer, businessman and political figure in the Province of New Brunswick, Canada. He represented York County in the Legislative Assembly of New Brunswick from 1892 to 1899 and from 1908 to 1925 as a Conservative member. In his lifetime he was known as the "King of Nackawic".

He was born in Yorkshire, the son of John Pinder, and came to York County with his family at the age of 8. He became involved in lumbering and milling, settling in Temperance Vale. Pinder married Mary Ann Annett. He served on the county council and was county warden. In 1899, he was defeated when he ran for reelection to the provincial assembly. Pinder was also president of the Southampton Railway Company, incorporated in 1910. In 1914, Liberal MP Frank Carvell charged that Pinder had illegally received federal subsidies for the railway; those charges were later proven to be true.

James and Mary Pinder are buried in St. Luke's Anglican Church Cemetery in Temperance Vale.
