= New Brunswick Route 610 =

Highway in New Brunswick, Canada

Coordinates: 46.044165°N 67.158051°W

Route 610

Route information
- Maintained by New Brunswick Department of Transportation
- Length: 12 km (7.5 mi)

Major junctions
- North end: Route 104 in Upper Hainesville
- South end: Route 105 in Upper Queensbury

Location
- Country: Canada
- Province: New Brunswick

Highway system
- Provincial highways in New Brunswick; Former routes
← Route 605	→ Route 615

Route 610 is a 12.3-kilometre (7.6 mi) long north–south secondary highway in the eastern portion of New Brunswick, Canada.

The route starts at Route 104 in Upper Hainesville northeast of the rural community of Nackawic-Millville. The road travels southwest through a mostly forested area to the community of Upper Caverhill at the western terminus of Route 615. Continuing, the road ends at Route 105 in Upper Queensbury on the north bank of the Saint John River.
