= Coldstream, New Brunswick =

Community in New Brunswick, Canada

Coordinates: 46°21′N 67°28′W

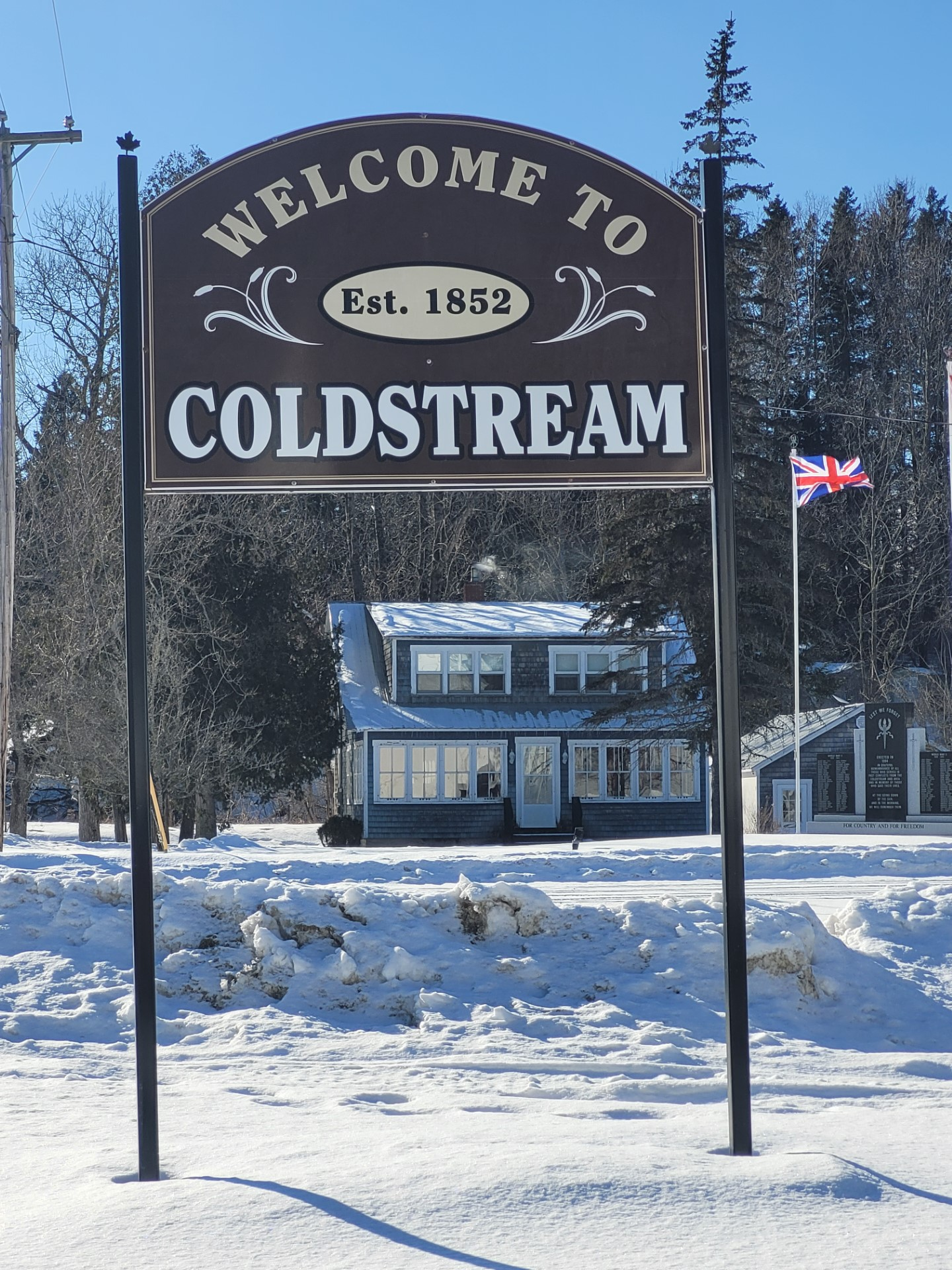

Coldstream is a Canadian community in Brighton Parish, New Brunswick. It has a population of 102 people as of the 2021 census.

Coldstream is located 6.4 km west of Carlisle, on the road to Hartland. It is next to the Becaguimec Stream.

== History ==
It was settled about 1826. It was first called Rockland and was renamed Coldstream when the post office was created in 1852. In 1866 Coldstream was a farming settlement with about 90 families. In 1871, the community and surrounding district had a population of 400. In 1898 Coldstream was a village with 1 post office, 3 stores, 1 sawmill, 1 hotel, 2 churches, and a population 250. The Post office was closed in 1969. As of the 2011 census, 150 people lived here, a gain from the 2006 census (128). According to the 2021 census the population of Coldstream dropped by 32.5%(102) from 2016(151).

== Demographics ==
In the 2021 Census of Population conducted by Statistics Canada, Coldstream had a population of 102 living in 45 of its 50 total private dwellings, a change of -32.5% from its 2016 population of 151. With a land area of 4.33 km^{2} (1.67 sq mi), it had a population density of 23.6/km^{2} (61.0/sq mi) in 2021.

== See also ==
- List of communities in New Brunswick
