= New Brunswick and Canada Railway and Land Company =

New Brunswick and Canada Railway and Land Company's Act 1857
- Act of Parliament
- Parliament of the United Kingdom
- Long title: An Act for the Transfer of the Interests of the Class A Shareholders of the Saint Andrew's and Quebec Railroad Company to "The New Brunswick and Canada Railway and Land Company (Limited)."
- Citation: 20 & 21 Vict. c. cliv

Dates
- Royal assent: 17 August 1857

Text of statute as originally enacted

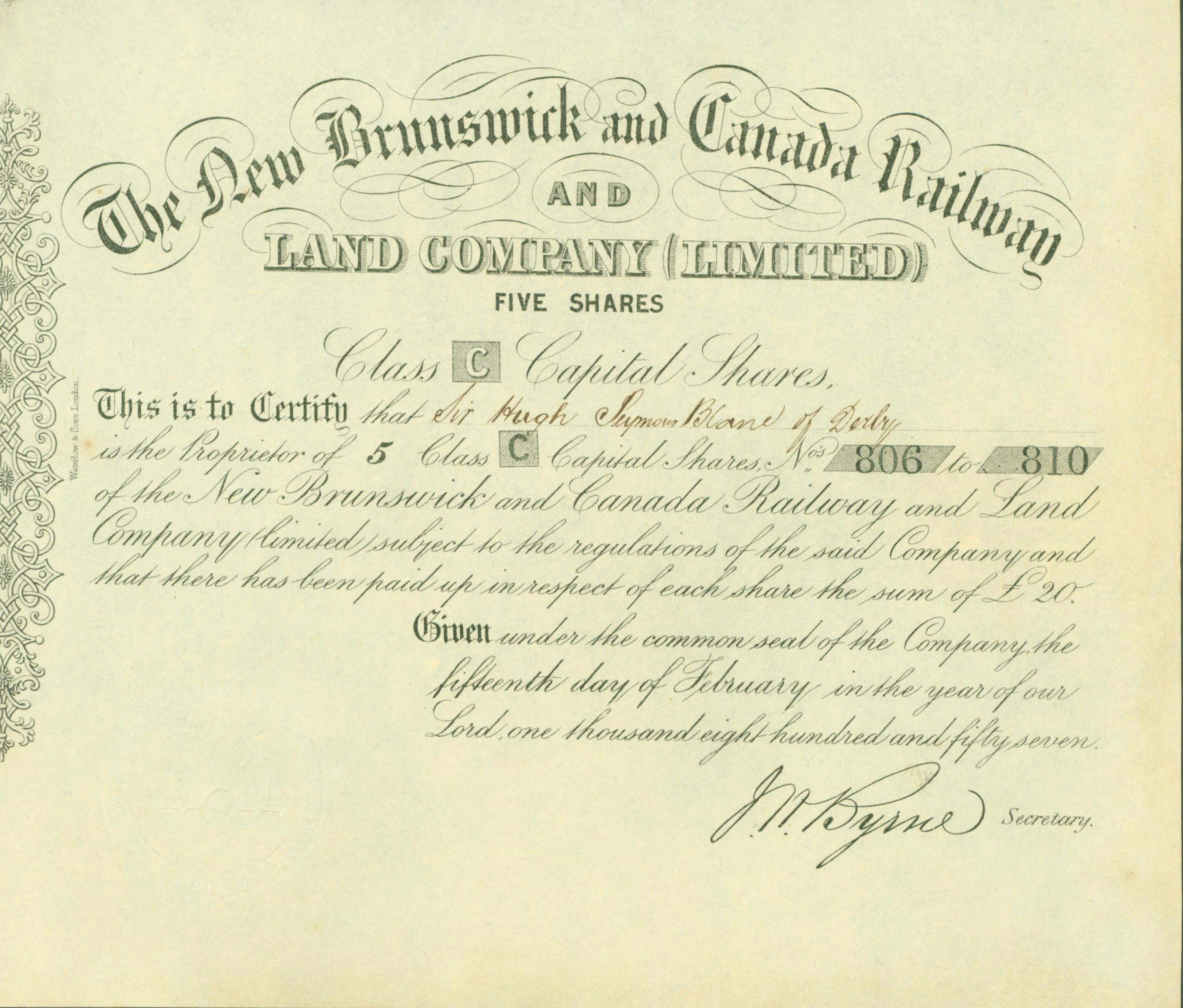
Share of the New Brunswick and Canada Railway and Land Company (Ltd), issued 15 February 1857

The New Brunswick and Canada Railway and Land Company was chartered in or prior to 1856 by Act of the New Brunswick Legislature. In that year, it took over the St. Andrews and Quebec Railway Company, which had been formed in 1836. This was authorised by an act of the Imperial Parliament, the New Brunswick and Canada Railway and Land Company's Act 1857 (20 & 21 Vict. c. cliv).

It acquired 10,000 acres for every mile built of a railroad between Fredericton and Trois-Rivières; in other words, 1.6 million acres in total. The railway was leased to the Canadian Pacific Railway when the NBCRLC ran into financial difficulties, but its control remained of the land, which was leased in exchange of stumpage to various timber companies. The company was granted lands, among others, in the Restigouche River, the Miramichi River and the Tobique River watersheds, and it maintained a staff in Saint John, New Brunswick to oversee stumpage on its lands.

When, during World War II, the British owners decided to sell, the firms that held leases were asked to buy them by general manager W. E. Golding, but all refused for one reason or another. In January 1942 Fraser Companies of Edmundston bought 85,652 acres on the Green River for $3.50 per; while in March 1942 D'Auteuil Lumber Co. bought 40,000 acres in the region of St. Francis for $3.42 per; in 1943, Fraser Companies paid $3.18 per acre for a 627,840-acre tract; close to 176,000 acres were sold a month later on the Restigouche for $4.03 to an Irving company; again a month later, 30,248 acres were sold at $2.18 per acre to Flemming and Gibson, who had been the lessees of the tract in counties Victoria and Carleton. Yearly taxation at the time was $2 per acre.

Then, some time prior to March 1945, the company, with its remnant 698,000 acres, was bought outright by Irving for $1.2 million. The net cost to him per acre was $1.50.
