= Keswick River =

River in New Brunswick, Canada

Coordinates: 45°59′33.64″N 66°49′40.44″W

The Keswick River is a tributary of the Saint John River in York County, New Brunswick in Canada. Early documents referred to it as Madam Keswick River.

The Keswick River watershed is entirely rural, dominated by forests and small farms in the communities of Mouth of Keswick, Burtts Corner, Zealand and Nackawic-Millville.

== See also ==
- List of bodies of water of New Brunswick
