= Mactaquac Dam =

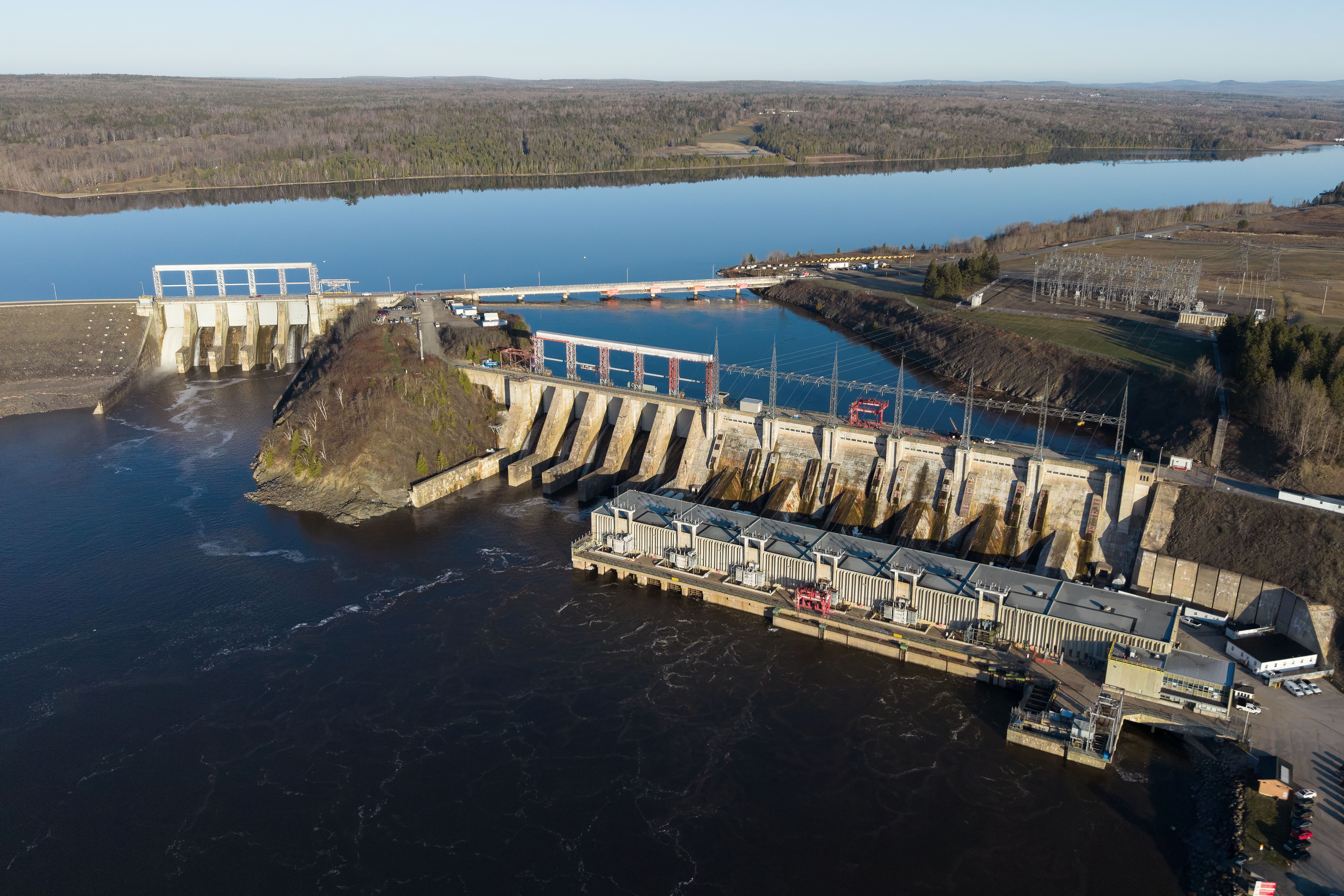
- Mactaquac Dam in 2026, seen from the east

- Mactaquac Dam in New Brunswick.
- Official name: Mactaquac Generating Station
- Country: Canada
- Location: Bright Parish / Kingsclear Parish, York County, New Brunswick
- Coordinates: 45°57′15.2″N 66°52′5.8″W
- Status: Operational
- Construction began: 1965; 61 years ago
- Opening date: 1968; 58 years ago
- Owner: NB Power

Dam and spillways
- Type of dam: Embankment dam
- Impounds: Saint John River
- Height: 55 m (180 ft)
- Length: 518 m (1,699 ft)
- Spillways: 2
- Spillway type: Concrete
- Spillway capacity: 16,282.18679 m^{3} (575,000.000 cu ft) per second

Reservoir
- Creates: Mactaquac Headpond
- Total capacity: 1,307,491,000 m^{3} (4.61736×10^{10} cu ft)
- Surface area: 83.85 km^{2} (20,720 acres)
- Maximum water depth: 39.624 m (130.00 ft)

Power Station
- Type: Run-of-the-river
- Hydraulic head: 31.7 m (104 ft) - 35.4 m (116 ft)
- Turbines: 6 x Kaplan
- Installed capacity: 653 MW
- Capacity factor: 27.9%
- Annual generation: 1,600 GWh (5,800 TJ)

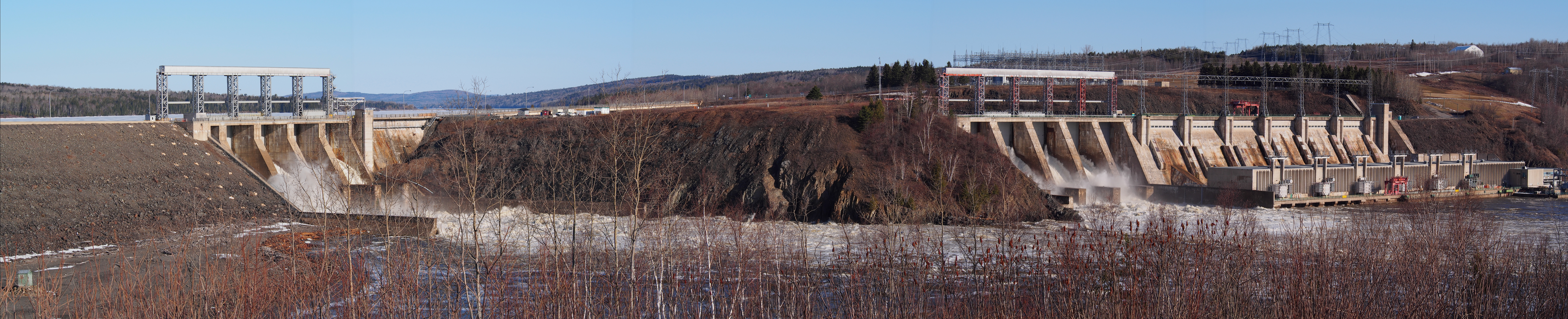
Mactaquac Dam with the spillways open, April 2017.

The Mactaquac Dam is an embankment dam used to generate hydroelectricity in Mactaquac, New Brunswick. It dams the waters of the Saint John River and is operated by NB Power with a capacity to generate 670 megawatts of electricity from 6 turbines; this represents 20 percent of New Brunswick's power demand.

== Location ==
Formally called the Mactaquac Generating Station, the dam and power house are located approximately 19 km (12 mi) upstream from the city of Fredericton. The dam is an embankment dam consisting of a rock-fill structure sealed by clay. It combines with two concrete spill-ways to form an arch across a narrow section of the river between the communities of Kingsclear on the west bank, and Keswick Ridge on the east bank.

== Construction ==
Rising 40 metres in height above the river level, the reservoir (referred to locally as the "head pond" or Lake Mactaquac) covers 87 square kilometres and extends 96 kilometres upstream, near Woodstock. The dam and powerhouse are a "run of the river" design, meaning that the reservoir has no additional holding capacity in the event of unusually high water flows, such as during the spring freshet.

Kingsclear, NB is the site of an Atlantic Salmon fish hatchery, located immediately downstream from the dam. The Mactaquac Dam also has a fishway to catch salmon and transport them upriver.

The dam also serves as a locally important public road bridge across the Saint John River, linking provincial highways 102 and 105 on the south and north sides of the river.

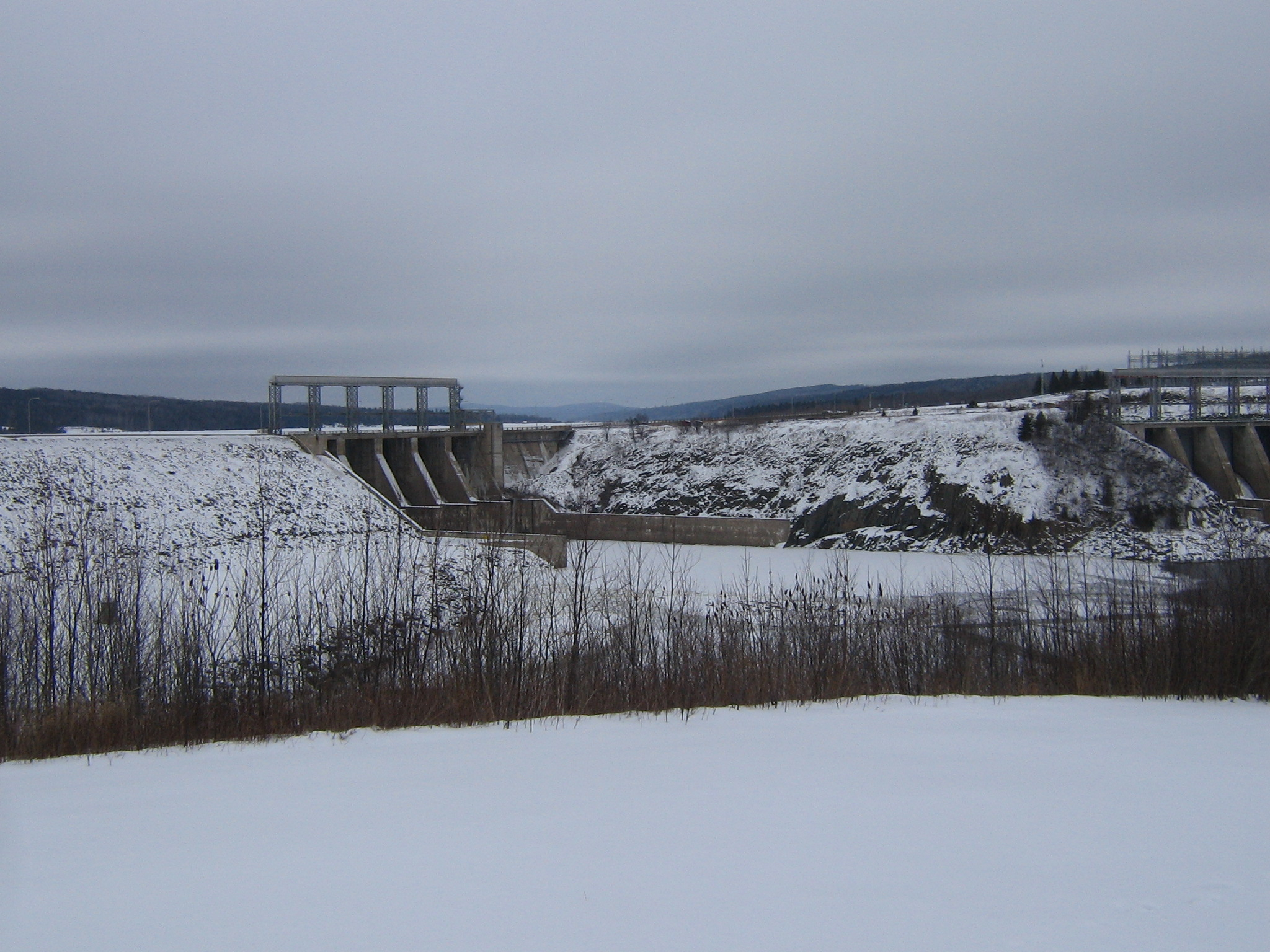
Mactaquac Dam in January 2005 from downstream side showing spillway

== Flooding of the Mactaquac Headpond ==
Electrical generation began in 1968 after the reservoir, Mactaquac Lake, had completely filled. The flooding of the valley resulted in the displacement of several thousand residents and land owners in areas such as Bear Island and other small communities, as well as the abandonment of a Canadian National Railway line and numerous local roads and small rural communities. A historic waterfall called the Pokiok Falls was also submerged as the reservoir filled.

Some new infrastructure was also built as part of the planned flooding of the Saint John River valley. The provincial government built Highway 2 (the Trans Canada Highway) along the southwestern shoreline of the flooded valley. Since 2001, this road has been bypassed and is now designated Highway 102. The Hawkshaw Bridge, a cable-stayed suspension bridge, was constructed across the valley from Hawkshaw to Southampton. At the time of construction in 1967, the bridge was high above the valley floor and the original river level. The planned town of Nackawic-Millville, New Brunswick and the nearby St. Anne Nackawic pulp and paper mill were also built to accommodate the new reservoir and the new electrical power opportunities. Closer to the dam, the Mactaquac Provincial Park, including a marina and beach was also built.

Following the success of preserving historic buildings at Upper Canada Village when the upper St. Lawrence River valley was flooded by the Long Sault Dam, the government of New Brunswick created the King's Landing Historical Settlement to save several buildings which would otherwise have been flooded by the Mactaquac Headpond.

== Lifespan ==
The concrete portions of the dam (namely the spill-ways) are currently experiencing a problem of expanding concrete. When built, locally quarried greywacke was used as the aggregate and is responsible for an alkali-aggregate reaction expansion. The dam is being monitored and extra maintenance work is being performed. The maintenance involves an annual cutting of the dam whereby a cutting cable with teeth is run through the entire structure essentially cutting the dam in half. This allows the dam to continue expanding whilst limiting internal stresses on the structure.

The reduced lifespan of the spillway and dam was first brought to the attention of the provincial government in 2000 when projections by NB Power at that time had placed the dam's end-of-life at 2028, instead of the original 100-year lifespan of 2068. NB Power officials would not say at that time how much it would cost, nor when those costs would show up on the utility's accounts.

On October 1, 2014, NB Power officials presented 3 options for the facility to the provincial utility regulator, the New Brunswick Energy and Utilities Board. A decision will have to be made by 2030 to either restore or decommission as follows:

- Re-power the dam by replacing the spillway and the powerhouse;
- No continued power generation, maintain the headpond by replacing the spillway but not the powerhouse;
- Remove the spillway, powerhouse and earthen dam and restore the river to its original state.

All 3 options have a minimum cost of $2 billion (as of 2014), however, the first option also has an additional cost of $1–3 billion and the third option has not had a complete cost estimate provided.

In December 2016, the utility announced that it would refurbish the plant to extend its useful life back to 2068 at a cost of between $2.8 to $3.6 billion. While some local residents were pleased by the announcement, the Kingsclear Maliseet First Nation, located on the riverbank opposite the dam, were "deeply disappointed".

NB Power entered into a technical assistance agreement with Hydro-Québec on January 10, 2020. The Quebec utility will provide assistance with repairing AAR damage to the concrete structures, reducing the cost of renovating the dam. The agreement also provides the New Brunswick with utility replacement power for the duration of the project.

== Inspiration for arts and culture ==
The building of the dam was the inspiration for Riel Nason’s 2011 novel The Town That Drowned, published by Goose Lane Editions. The fictional book, winner of the 2012 Commonwealth Book Prize, is set in the 1960s near Pokiok Falls, where the characters learn their homes will soon be swallowed by the rising water.
