= Nackawic =

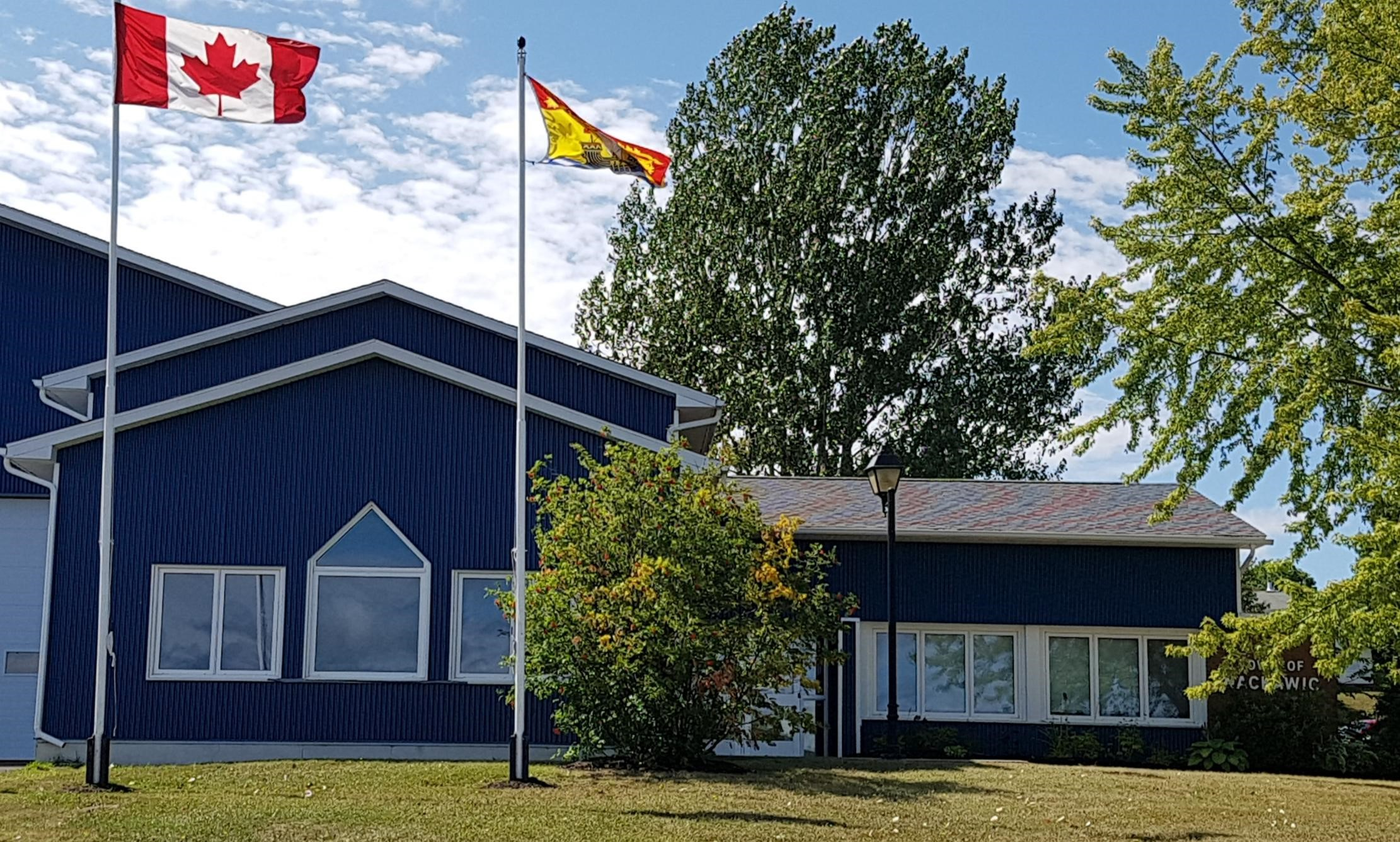
- Nackawic Town Hall

- Seal
- Nickname: Home of the world's largest axe / Gateway to Mactaquac Country
- Location of Nackawic in New Brunswick
- Coordinates: 46.00529°N 67.23594°W
- Country: Canada
- Province: New Brunswick
- County: York County
- Parish: Queensbury Parish
- Municipality: Nackawic-Millville
- Settled: 1784
- Incorporated: 1976

Area
  - Land: 7.68 km^{2} (2.97 sq mi)
- Elevation: 139 m (455 ft)

Population (2021)
  - Total: 962
  - Density: 125.2/km^{2} (324/sq mi)
  - Change (2016–21): ▲2.2%
- Time zone: UTC-4 (AST)
  - Summer (DST): UTC-3 (ADT)
- Canadian Postal code: E6G
- Area code: 506
- Telephone Exchanges: 575, 593
- Website: nackawic.com

Nackawic is a former town in New Brunswick, Canada. It held town status prior to 2023 and is now part of the rural community of Nackawic-Millville. It is approximately 65 km west of the city of Fredericton on the east bank of the Saint John River.

Nackawic, from the Wolastoqey Nelgwaweegek, "straight stream", possibly in reference to how the mouth faces the Saint-John River.

== History ==
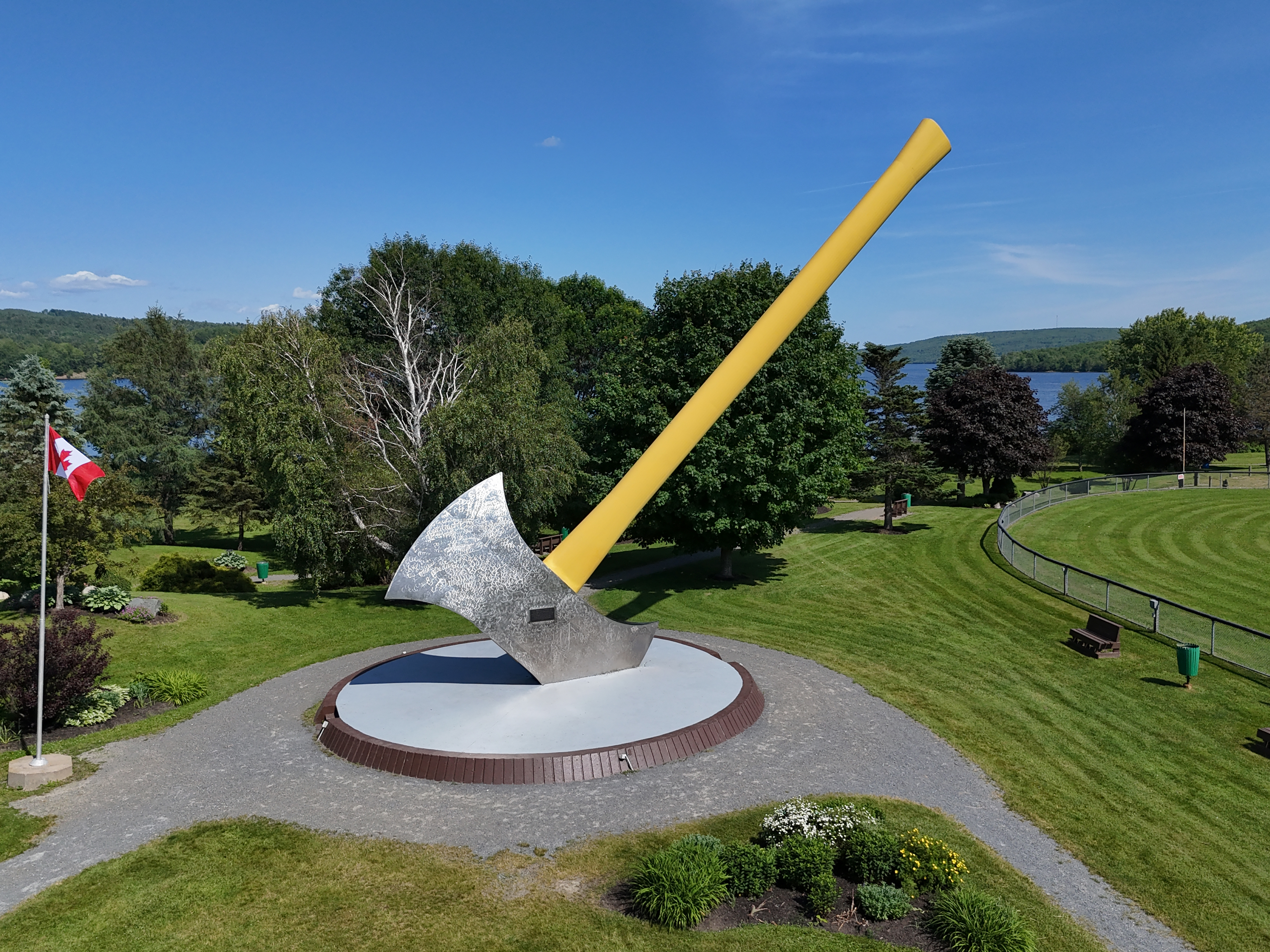
World's Largest Axe

The area was first settled in 1784 by the United Empire Loyalists, primarily through land grants to the families of soldiers who had fought with His Majesty's Regiment of Queen's Rangers during the American Revolutionary War.

Previously known as Otis, the development of town began in the late 1960s and was built so those forced to relocate as a result of the Mactaquac Dam being constructed would have a place to reside. Construction of the pulp mill, built to employ these displaced persons who lost their traditional farming opportunities that came with the dam, occurred between 1967 and 1970.

Nackawic was officially incorporated as a town in 1976.

On 1 January 2023, Nackawic amalgamated with the village of Millville and parts of four local service districts to form the new incorporated rural community of Nackawic-Millville. The community's name remains in official use.

=== Pulp mill ===
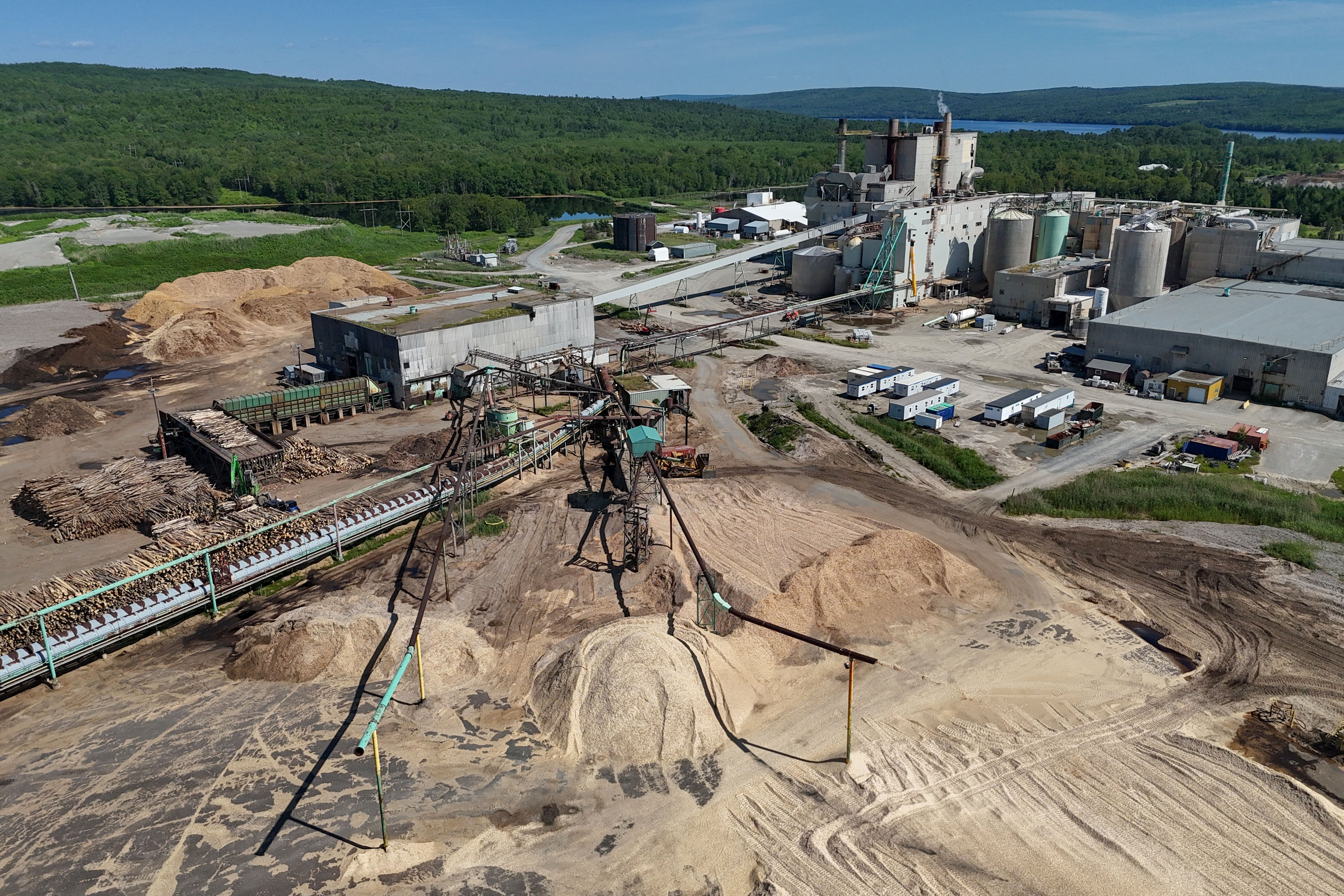
AV Nackawic pulp and paper mill in 2025

The town's largest employer, from 1970 until September 14, 2004, was St. Anne Nackawic Pulp Company Ltd., founded by Karl F. Landegger. The mill closed on September 14 and its owners declared bankruptcy the following day, putting 406 people out of work. About 350 contract workers in the middle of a maintenance shutdown were also affected. The mill itself was left in a state of disassembly.

Construction of the mill began in 1967, following the building of the Mactaquac Dam. The plant manufactured high-quality, photographic grade kraft pulp. Increasing energy, material and labor costs here at home; new competition from overseas mills able to operate much less expensively as well as the continuing devaluation of the US dollar, combined with the rapid increase in value of the Canadian dollar, all contributed significantly to the St. Anne Nackawic plant becoming less viable.

At the same time, the provincial government had been undertaking a reorganization of Crown timber lands in New Brunswick in recent years which was rumored to include a reduction in the timber harvest for the St. Anne Nackawic mill. Additionally, the rise in use of digital cameras and resulting decline in the use of photographic paper had reduced the demand for St. Anne Nackawic's product.

It was revealed during bankruptcy proceedings that St. Anne Nackawic Pulp Company Ltd. owed $101.2 million to its creditors, including $50.2 million to unsecured creditors. It was also learned that the company-funded employee pension plans were under-funded, as allowed by law. Employees under the age of 55 were informed that it was unlikely that they would receive any pension benefits. The Government of New Brunswick later stepped in and, faced with an extremely difficult decision, created a new distribution model that would see the pension fund shared by all employees, including those in the under 55 group. Understandably, those receiving pension benefits prior to the mill’s closure were outraged at the thought of being forced to give up a portion of their pension so that the under 55 group would to have at least something to look forward to during their golden years. The loss of pension benefits and the perceived unfairness of distribution sparked an outcry for the provincial government to intervene. Legal action against the Province resulted and as of July 2007, retirees and other employees still do not know what the final outcome of the pension situation will be.

George Landegger, chairman and CEO of Parsons & Whittemore (later acquired by Georgia-Pacific ) of Rye Brook, New York, which was the holding company that owned St. Anne Industries which in turn owned St. Anne Nackawic Pulp Company Ltd., was responsible for ordering the shutdown. Having been unable to secure a traditional lending institution after its Bank loans were called in 2001, St. Anne Industries, in an effort to continue the operations at Nackawic, replaced the Bank and thus became the primary secured creditor of the St. Anne Nackawic mill. Many persons impacted negatively by the closure, either uninformed or unwilling to accept the cold, harsh reality of the situation, were unable to comprehend how the primary secured creditor could rightfully receive the funds to which it was entitled – enjoying the same right as the Bank in similar proceedings. Parsons and Whittemore later agreed to relinquish title to the plant and equipment, and at the same time shedding its officers and directors of their personal liability environmental – a rather serious matter that transcends all Bankruptcy law, allowing the provincial government to seek a buyer for the facility.

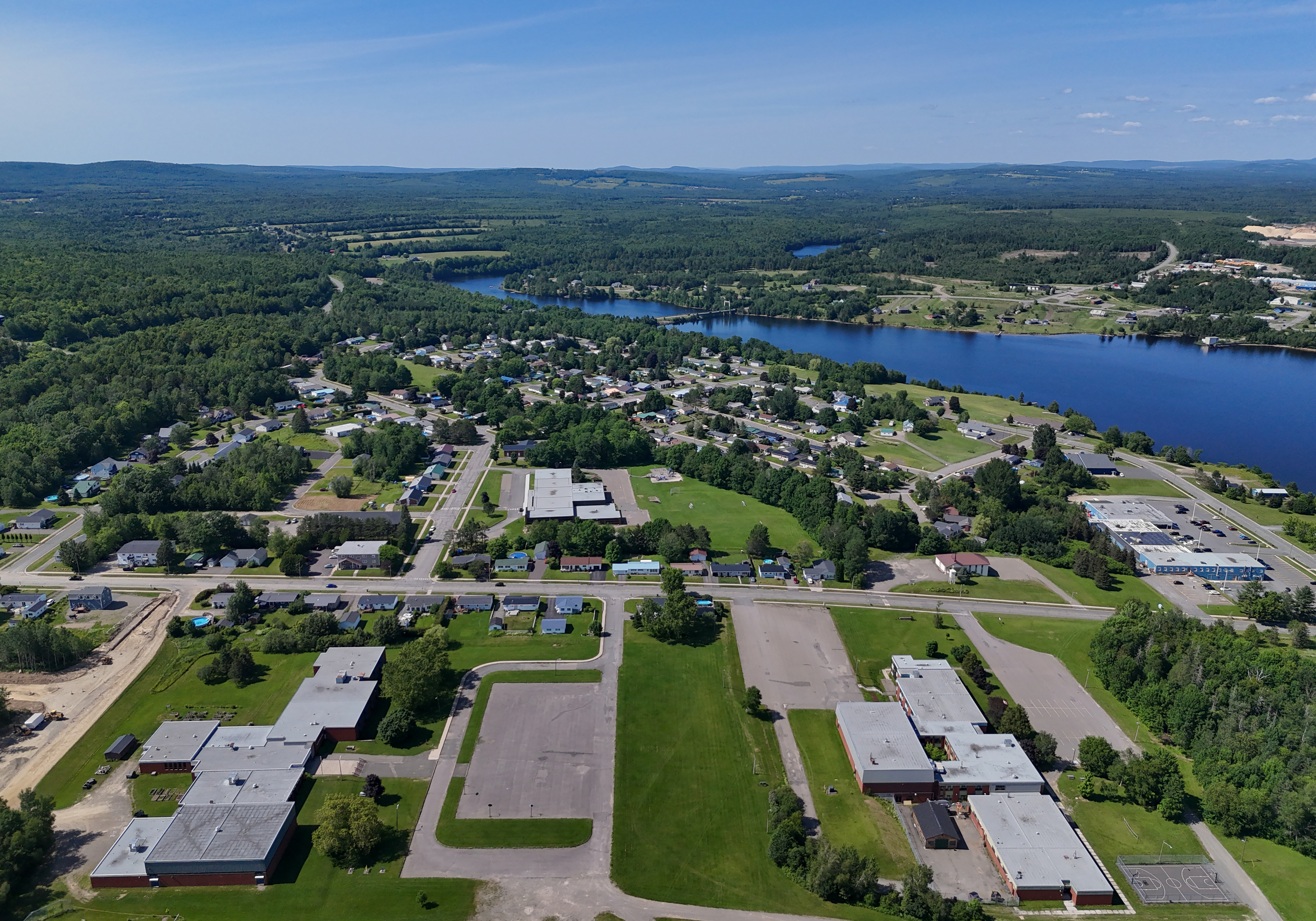
Aerial view of town

In addition to most of the local businesses in the Nackawic area, some of the creditors and companies affected by the closure of the mill included the Port of Saint John, Logistec Corporation, Wallenius Wilhelmsen, and Star Shipping. It is certainly notable that the aforementioned Logistec Corporation received, from the Landegger-appointed Receiver, full and complete payment for everything it was owed up to the moment of Bankruptcy. This payment was made after the Bankruptcy was declared and was successfully challenged in the Courts by the replacement Trustee. In a surprise decision that left the legal community entirely baffled, the New Brunswick Court of Appeals later ruled that this was not a preferential payment, which would have been in serious contravention of the BIA (Bankruptcy and Insolvency Act).

A group of 19 contractors working on site when the mill was closed joined together and was successful in a number of significant wins in the Bankruptcy proceedings. First, this group of 19 secured their position by placing liens on the mill property. Next, the group of 19 had the original Trustee, who also served as the Landegger-appointed Receiver, replaced with one who would better serve the best interests of all the unsecured creditors. At the first Meeting of Creditors, the original Trustee told those in attendance that there was "absolutely no money in the Estate for the unsecured creditors". However, the newly installed Trustee was successful in finding more than five million dollars. These funds were secured for the benefit of all unsecured creditors and distributed accordingly.

Then, the group of 19 was successful in its bid to have frozen all funds held by the Receiver for the benefit of the primary secured creditor, effectively preventing the primary secured creditor from realizing on its security and, the resulting removal of these monies from the Province. Eventually faced with the inability to continue funding the many challenges entirely on their own, without assistance from the other major stakeholders, the group had no choice but to release their hold on these funds.

It was very unfortunate that those representing union and staff, as well as the appointed pension fund administrator did not see fit to join the group of 19 in helping fund the efforts of the new Trustee, for if they had the 5 million dollar pot would have likely grown substantially, benefiting all the unsecured creditors — the largest portion of which consisted of the displaced employees.

In the fall of 2004, some of the laid-off workers initially offered to work without pay in order to properly mothball the plant and protect the assets against the fast-approaching harsh winter season, ensuring the plant would be more attractive to any future potential buyers. With an injection of cash from both the Federal and provincial governments of the day, the work was carried out and the mill properly secured. (All workers received full pay for their efforts.) Other workers proposed buying the mill with government assistance and running it themselves. As the provincial government was also a creditor for the plant, it solicited potential pulp and paper industry companies such as J.D. Irving Limited and Tembec to purchase the mothballed mill.

After several discouraging months of little interest during the fall of 2004 and winter of 2005, the provincial government entered into negotiations with Quebec-based Tembec in early winter of 2005. A deal was announced, however Tembec subsequently backed out, on March 8, 2005, claiming that it wasn't economically feasible.

However, several weeks later, on April 1, 2005, the provincial government, led by Bernard Lord’s Tories, announced that Tembec would be forming a partnership with the Aditya Birla Group of India, which would see the Nackawic mill reopened as a joint venture, with Tembec the lead operator of the facility. The plant reopened on January 16, 2006, under the AV Nackawic banner.

The Tembec-Aditya Birla Group agreement is very similar to the operation of a pulp mill in Atholville, New Brunswick which had been mothballed between 1988–1994 in circumstances very similar to Nackawic's, causing significant damage to the economy of nearby Campbellton, New Brunswick. After Tembec-Aditya Birla Group purchased the former Fraser mill, the facility was converted to a dissolving pulp production operation and has operated successfully ever since as A.V. Cell Inc.

From August 2008, the AV Nackawic mill has been operating, and the new owners are currently making additional capital investment at the Nackawic facility. Once completed, the newly created ability to produce dissolving pulp will support the long-term viability of this business segment.

== 2014 Municipal building fire ==
On July 21, 2014, a man drove his pickup truck into the municipal building, which housed the town hall and the fire hall. The man was arrested by the RCMP. One fire official estimated cost of damage to the departments trucks to be $1.5 million.

== Demographics ==
In the 2021 Census of Population conducted by Statistics Canada, Nackawic had a population of 962 living in 428 of its 451 total private dwellings, a change of 2.2% from its 2016 population of 941. With a land area of 7.68 km^{2} (2.97 sq mi), it had a population density of 125.3/km^{2} (324.4/sq mi) in 2021.

From the 2016 Census :

Language usage -- 80.0% English only, 0.5% bilingual (English & French), 19.0% French only, 0.5% other
Ratio male/female -- 49.2 / 50.8
% of population under 15 -- 14.9%
% pop 15-64 -- 57.4%
% pop 65 and over -- 28.2%
Total Private Dwellings -- 455
Median household income (2015) -- $60,992

== Economy ==
Local business people, community leaders and other economic development groups form the Nackawic Region Economic Development Team designed to encourage and assist business development in the Nackawic and Mactaquac Headpond area. Nackawic also has membership in the South West Development Corporation.

== Attractions ==
Nackawic is home to the World's Largest Axe.

== Government ==
Final Council (at dissolution)

- Mayor Ian Kitchen
- Deputy Mayor Greg MacFarlane
- Coun. Gail M. Farnsworth
- Coun. Bob Simpson
- Coun. Brian E. Toole

Former mayors

- Byron Meredith
- Robert Simpson
- David MacLean
- Stephen Hawkes
- Craig Melanson
- Robert Connors
- Rowena Simpson
- Nancy A. Cronkhite

== Education ==
The town has four schools:

- Nackawic Elementary School
- Nackawic Middle School
- Nackawic Senior High,
- River Valley Christian Academy.

== Notable people ==
- Casey LeBlanc, 2005 Canadian Idol contestant
- Gordie Dwyer, NHL hockey player.
- Brandon Brewer, Professional boxer
- David Alward, Premier of New Brunswick (2010-2014)
- Dr. Chris Simpson, 147th President of the Canadian Medical Association (2014-2015)

== See also ==
- List of communities in New Brunswick
