= MV Star Osakana =

Japanese bulk carrier vessel

- The Star Osakana as photographed in 2006.

History
- Name: Star Osakana (2004-09); Osakana (since 2009)
- Owner: Masterbulk Pte
- Port of registry: Singapore (2004-09); Douglas, Isle of Man (since 2009)
- Builder: Oshima Shipbuilding
- Yard number: 10333
- Launched: 12 February 2004
- Identification: IMO number: 9253870; MMSI number: 235102349; Callsign 2HBU5
- Status: In service

General characteristics
- Type: Open hatch bulk carrier
- Tonnage: 36,700 GT, 13,900 NT, 45,656 DWT
- Length: 199 m (653 ft)
- Beam: 32.26 m (105.8 ft)
- Draught: 12 m (39 ft)
- Depth: 19 m (62 ft)
- Installed power: MAN B&W 6S60MC diesel engine 11,515 kilowatts (15,442 hp)
- Propulsion: Propeller
- Speed: 16.1 knots (29.8 km/h)
- Capacity: 2,286 TEU containers space; 65,338 cubic metres (85,459 cu yd) grain; 65,298 cubic metres (85,407 cu yd) bale goods
- Crew: 25

MV Osakana is an open hatch bulk carrier that was built in 2004 by Oshima Shipbuilding as Star Osakana for Masterbulk.

== Construction ==
The ship was launched on 12 February 2004 at Oshima Shipbuilding Co.'s yard in Ōshima, Nagasaki Prefecture as Yard Number 10333. She is 199 metres (653 ft) long overall (188 metres (617 ft) between perpendiculars) with a beam of 32.26 metres (105.8 ft) and a draught of 12 metres (39 ft). She is propelled by a MAN B&W 6S60MC engine which was manufactured by Kawasaki Heavy Industries. The engine is rated at 11,515 kilowatts (15,442 bhp). It drives a 6,600 mm (21 ft 8 in) diameter fixed pitch propeller, giving a speed of 16.1 knots (29.8 km/h) at 97.5rpm. The ship is also equipped with a Rolls-Royce bow thruster of 1,500 kilowatts (2,000 bhp) and a stern thruster of 940 kilowatts (1,260 bhp). Electricity is supplied by three generators; two rated at 1,470 kVA each and one rated at 1,259 kVA. Fuel capacity is 3,018 cubic metres (664,000 imp gal) fuel oil and 138 cubic metres (30,000 imp gal) diesel oil. The ship has capacity for 16,180 cubic metres (3,560,000 imp gal) of ballast water.

Cargo capacity is 2,286 TEU container space, or 65,338 cubic metres (2,307,400 cu ft) of grain or 65,298 cubic metres (2,306,000 cu ft) of bale goods. These are carried in eleven holds. Two Munck gantry cranes are fitted, each with a lift capacity of 68 tonnes (67 long tons), and which can travel the length of the ship. Accommodation for her 25 crew is at the aft of the ship.

== History ==
Star Osakana was completed on 23 April 2004 for Masterbulk Pte Ltd, the Singapore subsidiary of Norwegian shipping group Westfal-Larsen, for service with joint venture Star Shipping. The IMO Number 9253870 was allocated. Her initial port of registry was Singapore.

When Masterbulk and their partners Grieg Group demerged the Star Shipping business in 2009, she was renamed Osakana and reflagged to the Isle of Man, with Douglas as her port of registry. The MMSI number 235102349 and callsign 2HBU5 were allocated. In November 2009, she was lengthened by 13.5 metres (44 ft); a 700 tonnes (690 long tons) section being fitted midships by Chengxi Shipyard, Jiangyin, China.

In 2014 Masterbulk established a new venture with fellow Norwegian shipowners Saga Ship Holding to operate their fleets of open hatch gantry and jib-craned bulkers in a joint pool, Saga Welco, including Osakana.
