= Nackawic-Millville =

- Rural community
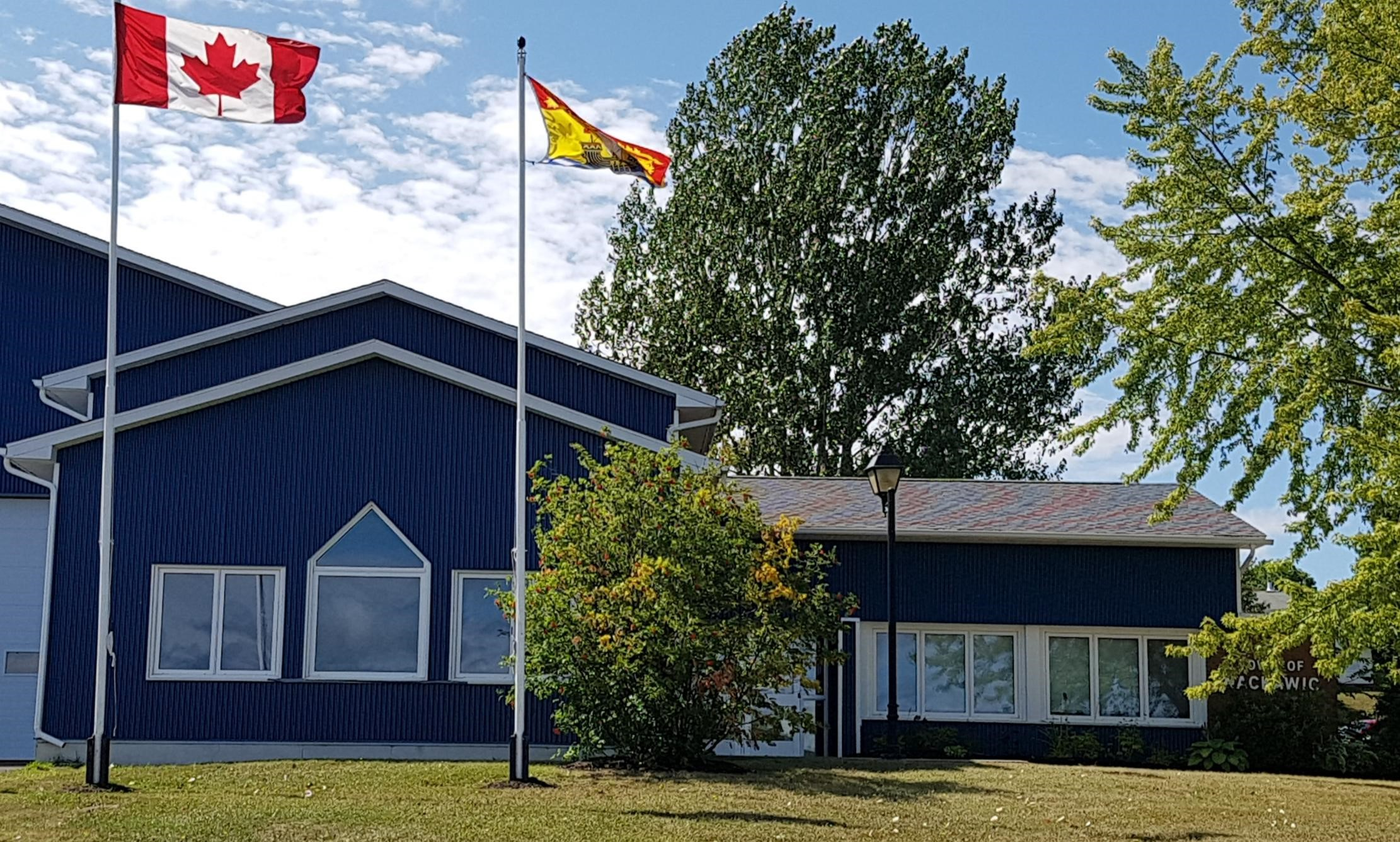

- Location within New Brunswick
- Coordinates: 45°59′47″N 67°14′22″W
- Country: Canada
- Province: New Brunswick
- County: York County
- Regional service commission: Capital Region
- Incorporated: January 1, 2023

Government
  - Mayor: Tim Fox
- Elevation: 139 m (455 ft)
- Time zone: UTC-4 (AST)
  - Summer (DST): UTC-3 (ADT)
- Postal code(s): E6E, E6G
- Area code: 506
- Telephone Exchanges: 575, 593

Nackawic-Millville is a rural community in the Canadian province of New Brunswick. It was formed through the 2023 New Brunswick local governance reforms.

== History ==
Nackawic-Millville was incorporated on January 1, 2023 via the amalgamation of the former town of Nackawic and the former village of Millville as well as the concurrent annexation of adjacent unincorporated areas.

== Economy ==
Local business people, community leaders and other economic development groups form the Nackawic Region Economic Development Team designed to encourage and assist business development in the Nackawic and Mactaquac Headpond area. Nackawic also has membership in the South West Development Corporation.

== Attractions ==
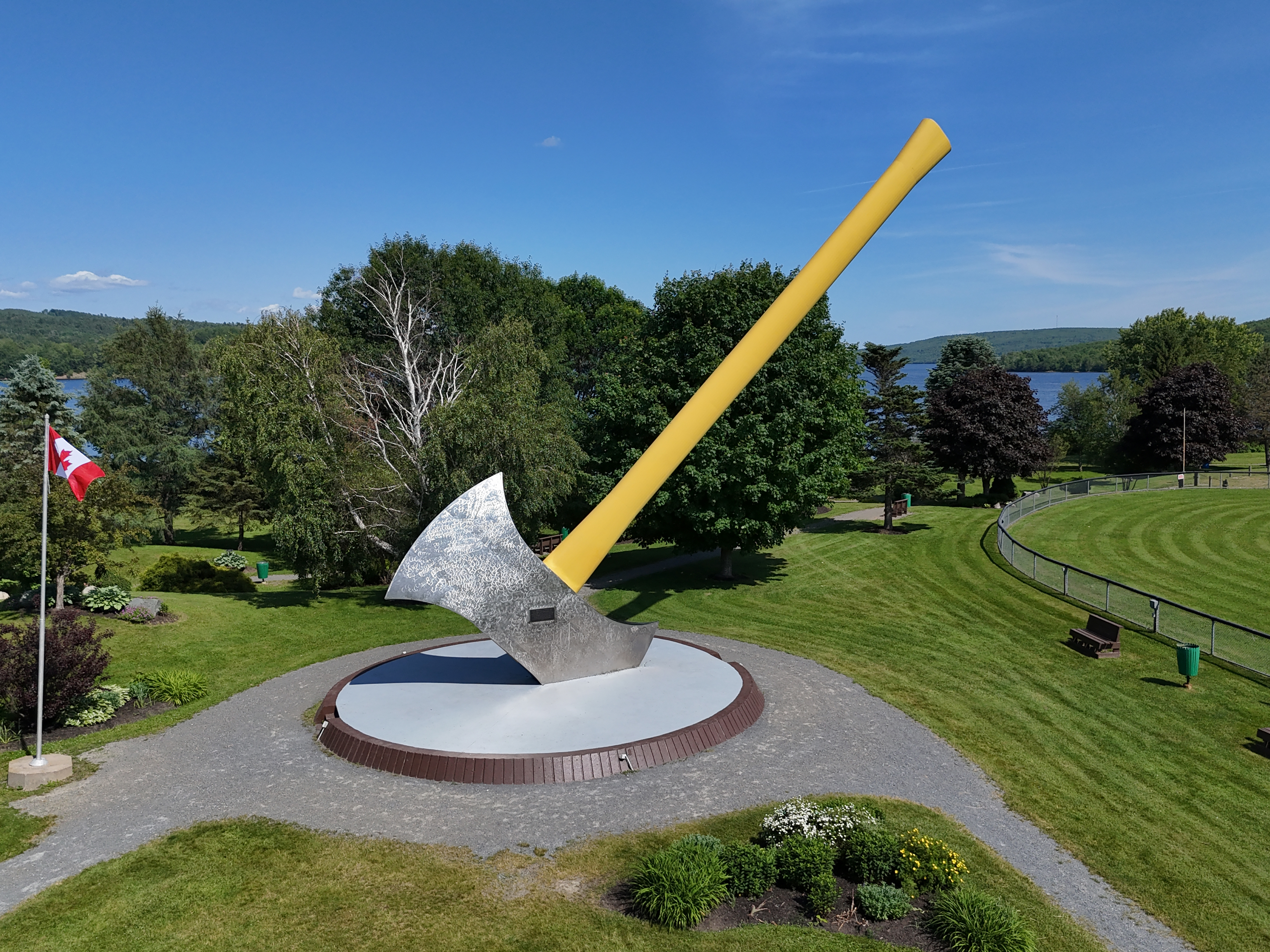
World's Largest Axe

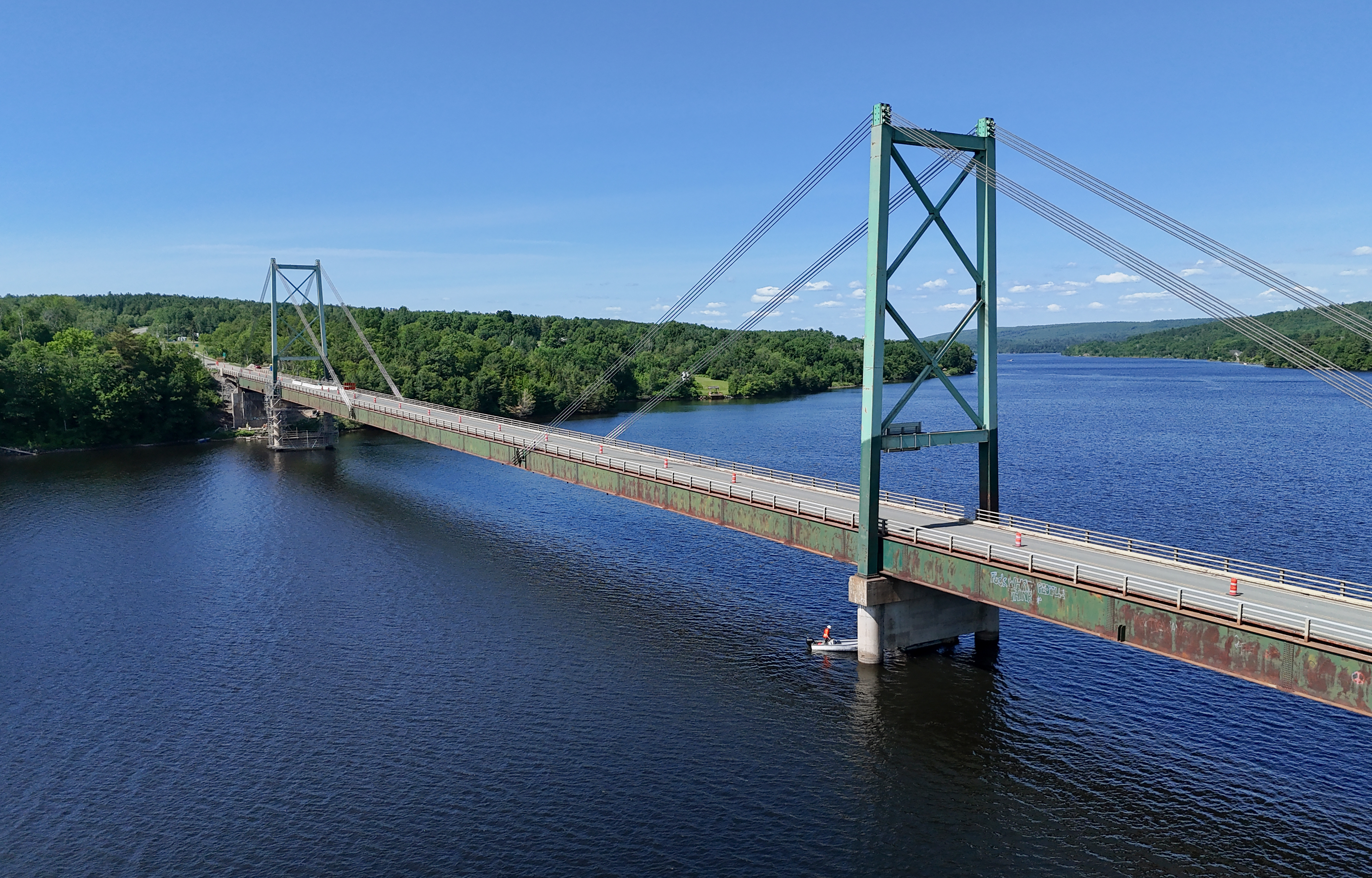
Hawkshaw Bridge

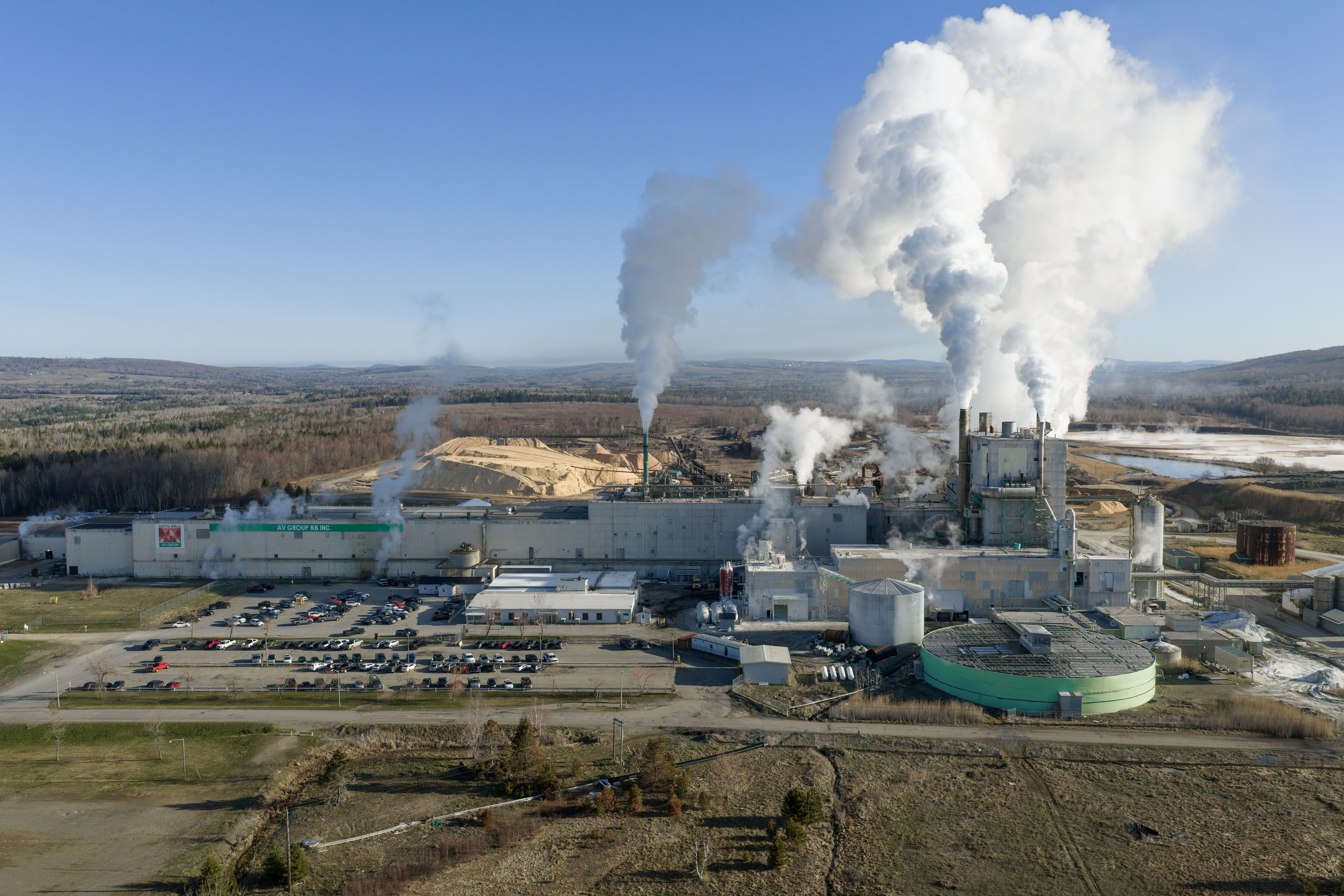
AV Nackawic pulp mill

Nackawic-Millville is home to the World's Largest Axe.

== Government ==
Final Council (at dissolution)

- Mayor Ian Kitchen
- Deputy Mayor Greg MacFarlane
- Coun. Gail M. Farnsworth
- Coun. Bob Simpson
- Coun. Brian E. Toole

Former mayors

- Byron Meredith
- Robert Simpson
- David MacLean
- Stephen Hawkes
- Craig Melanson
- Robert Connors
- Rowena Simpson
- Nancy A. Cronkhite

== Education ==
The Rural Community has four schools:

- Nackawic Elementary School
- Nackawic Middle School
- Nackawic Senior High,
- River Valley Christian Academy.

== Notable people ==
- Casey LeBlanc, 2005 Canadian Idol contestant
- Gordie Dwyer, NHL hockey player.
- Brandon Brewer, Professional boxer
- David Alward, Premier of New Brunswick (2010-2014)
- Dr. Chris Simpson, 147th President of the Canadian Medical Association (2014-2015)

== See also ==
- List of communities in New Brunswick
- List of municipalities in New Brunswick
