= Nackawic Senior High School =

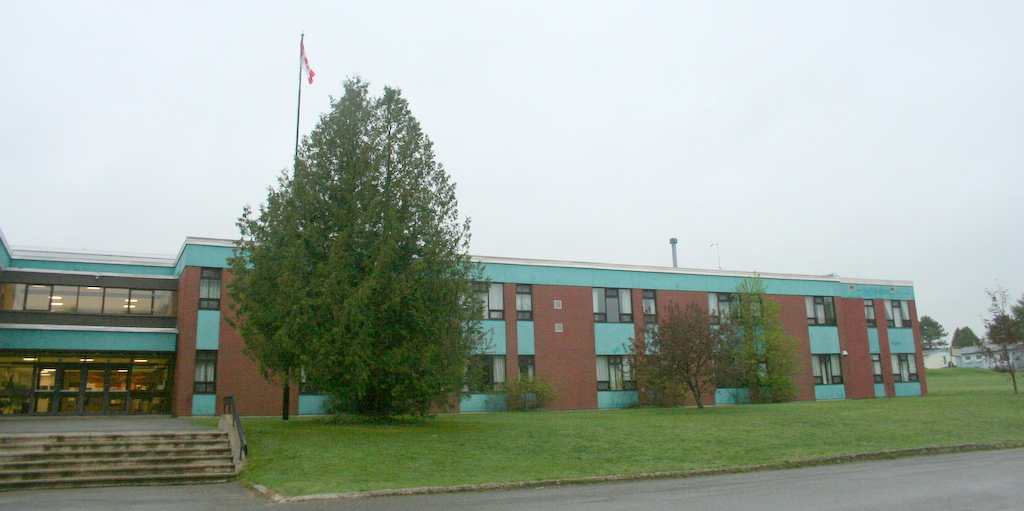

Location
- 30 Landegger Dr. Nackawic-Millville, New Brunswick, E6G 1E9; Canada; 45.99313°N 67.23807°W

Information
- School type: Public school
- Motto: Per Ardura Ad Astra (To The Stars Through Hard Work)
- Founded: 1967
- School district: Anglophone West School District (ASD-W)
- Principal: Sean Newlands
- Vice Principal: Ross Calder
- Grades: 9-12
- Enrollment: 250 (as of 2011)
- Language: English, some French Immersion courses
- Area: Town
- Colours: Garnet and Gold
- Mascot: Night Hawk
- Team name: Nackawic Night Hawks
- Feeder schools: Nackawic Middle School; Keswick Valley Memorial School
- Website: nhs.nbed.nb.ca

Nackawic Senior High School is a high school located in Nackawic-Millville, New Brunswick, Canada. Nackawic High receives new students primarily from Nackawic Middle School and Keswick Valley Memorial School, if they do not choose to attend Leo Hayes High School in Fredericton. The school houses the Nackawic Public-School Library, accessible by the public.

== History ==
The school was finished in October 1967, to replace Southampton Regional High School, the site of which was flooded by the construction of the Mactaquac Dam. Some classes were housed in temporary portable classrooms until 1971, when the Nackawic Junior High School was finished.

Originally, the school housed grades 7-12. Later, grades 7-9 were moved to the Junior High. In the 1990s, an addition was built on to accommodate grade 9, which was transferred back from Nackawic Middle School.

The French education program, originally a separate school (École Heritage de Nackawic), was established in October 1984 and housed in a group of portable classrooms to the side of the main building. The program was later shifted to the main building. The portables were later retired because of vandalism.

== Sports ==
The Nackawic High School Boys' Soccer Team won its first provincial championship in the fall of 2014. They defeated Stanley High School 2-1 on penalty kicks. Winning the provincial championship capped off a perfect season- regular season champions and regional champs. They had an impeccable record despite only losing one game- 1-0 to Carleton North in exhibition play. This year, the Nackawic High Schools Girls' Soccer Team made history by qualifying for the first time in 10 years for Regionals where they defeated McAdam To qualify for provincials for the first time ever in history. Also they beat Hartland in overtime to get the first-place position at provincials. Unfortunately, they were defeated by Peticodiac 1-0 at provincials and didn't advance to finals, but they had a great season

== Principals ==
- Albert Murray 1968-1980
- Karle F. Scott 1980-1998
- Wayne Annis 1998-2003
- Elaine Kilfillen 2003-2004
- Donna Seymour 2004–2016
- Kevin Inch 2016-2019
- Sean R. C. Newlands 2019–Present

== Notable alumni ==
- David Alward - Premier of New Brunswick, graduated c. 1970s
- Brandon Brewer - National Boxing Champion
- Derek Hatfield (1952–2016), first Canadian to race solo twice around the world
- Casey LeBlanc - Recording artist, graduated c. 2005
- Riel Nason, author, graduated 1987
- Dr. Chris Simpson, Cardiologist, graduated 1985. President of the Canadian Medical Association.
