= Grieg Star =

Norwegian shipping company

Grieg Star Group AS
- Company type: Private
- Industry: Shipping
- Founded: 1961
- Headquarters: Bergen, Norway
- Area served: Global
- Key people: Matt Duke (CEO)
- Revenue: 170mUSD (2019)
- Number of employees: 1100 (2019)
- Parent: Grieg Group
- Subsidiaries: Grieg Star AS, Grieg Green, Grieg Philippines, Grieg Edge, various ship owning companies
- Website: www.griegstar.com

Grieg Star Group AS is a corporation within shipping and shipping related businesses. The Grieg Star Group is a part of the Grieg Group, established in 1884. It has subsidiaries within shipping, ship owning, ship management, crewing, sustainable ship recycling and maritime innovation. The headquarter of Grieg Star Group is in Grieg Gaarden, Bergen, Norway. Besides, the corporation has offices in Oslo, Manila and Shanghai.

Grieg Star Group specialises in Open hatch bulk carriers. Still, one-fourth of its vessels are conventional bulk carriers. Through its subsidiaries, the corporation owned and chartered over 40 ships in June 2020. The group's own ship management subsidiary, Grieg Star AS, managed over half of these. Grieg Philippines Ltd was responsible for the manning of the vessels managed by Grieg Star AS.

In 2017, Grieg Star Group established a joint venture with Gearbulk, creating G2 Ocean AS. The joint venture is the biggest Open Hatch shipping company in the world, operating close to 125 ships by June 2020, with offices in 15 countries worldwide. G2 Ocean commercially operates all of Grieg Star Group's controlled ships.

In 2010, Grieg Star Group established Grieg Green, a company specialising on green ship recycling. Grieg Green has since expanded its portfolio and offers a variety of green/sustainable services to the maritime businesses. Never having scrapped a ship using beaching (nautical), Grieg Star Group was the first company to recycle a vessel according to the EU Ship Recycling Regulation in January 2019.

The corporation has had a sustainability focus for decades. In 2008, Grieg Star Group became a signatory of the ten principles of United Nations Global Compact, and in 2019 they joined the UNGC Sustainable Ocean Business Action Platform through Grieg Group. In 2011, it was one of the founding companies of The Maritime Anti-Corruption Network (MACN). Grieg Foundation owns 25% of Grieg Star Group through its ownership in Grieg Group.

== History ==
- 1884: Joachim Grieg sets up his shipbroker business in Bergen, Norway. It will evolve to become the Grieg Group.
- 1961: Norwegian Peer Waaler establishes Star Shipping
- 1962: Together with Westfal-Larsen, Star Shipping sets up the Star Pool.
- 1964: Per Waaler relinquished the name "Star" to the pool, now named Star Bulk Shipping. He joins forces with Per Grieg to form the ship owning company Billabong AS.
- 1965: Star Bulk Shipping revolutionises the Open Hatch concept, adding gantry cranes to the vessels.
- 1972: Per Waaler dies in a plane crash (Japan Air Lines Flight 446). Per Grieg eventually controls Billabong AS
- 1984: Star Shipping starts container line services together with Atlantic Cargo Services.
- 2006: Billabong AS eventually changes name to Grieg Shipping Group
- 2008: After some years of friction, the owners of Star Shipping agree to split. Grieg gets the name "Star Shipping", and integrates Grieg Shipping Group with Star Shipping in Grieg Star Group AS.
- 2010: Grieg Green is established
- 2017: Joint venture with Gearbulk: G2 Ocean
