= Per Grieg =

Norwegian ship broker and ship owner (1932–2024)

- Born: 31 January 1932; Bergen, Norway
- Died: 11 January 2024 (aged 91)
- Education: Norwegian Institute of Technology
- Occupations: Ship broker and ship owner
- Children: 4, including Elisabeth
- Awards: Order of St. Olav (2001)

Per Grieg (31 January 1932 – 11 January 2024) was a Norwegian ship broker and ship owner. He was co-owner and chief executive of the Grieg Group.

He was a significant contributor to musical institutions in Bergen, and to the SOS Children's Villages.

== Personal life ==
Grieg was born in Bergen on 31 January 1932, a son of architect Per Geelmuyden Grieg and Inger Bratt. He married Elna Lingjerde Pedersen in 1954.

He had one son and three daughters, including ship owner Elisabeth Grieg.

== Career ==
Grieg graduated as engineer from the Norwegian Institute of Technology in 1956, and worked some years at Det Bergenske Dampskipsselskap. From 1960 he was assigned as ship broker for the family company Joachim Grieg & Co, later becoming the Grieg Group. A co-owner from 1963, he was chief executive from 1972 to 1999. He retired as CEO of the company in 1999, but continued as chairman of the board.

== Contributions to music and humanitarian aid ==
Grieg contributed to musical life in Bergen in various ways. His company was the main sponsor for the Bergen Philharmonic Orchestra. He also supported the Bergen National Opera and the Bergen International Festival.

His humanitarian aid mainly came through the Grieg Foundation, and projects through the SOS Children's Villages.

He was decorated Knight of the Order of St. Olav in 2001.

== Death ==
Grieg died on 11 February 2024, at the age of 91. (Note: The encyclopedia Store Norske Leksikon wrongly gave 2023 as death year, as of September 2024.)
