= Star Shipping =

Norwegian shipping company

Grieg Star Shipping AS
- Type: Private
- Industry: Shipping
- Founded: 1961
- Headquarters: Bergen, Norway,
- Area served: Global
- Key people: Tom Rasmussen(CEO)
- Parent: Grieg Group
- Website: www.griegstar.com

Star Shipping was a shipping company based in Bergen, Norway that in 2008 operated 60–70 vessels with a total of 3 million deadweight tonnes. It was founded in 1961 as a joint venture between Grieg Group and Masterbulk. The main area of co-operation was in industrial transport of forest products with 50 open hatch ships. It also operated 20 handysize and handymax bulk carriers as well as two container ships, and was the operator of Squamish Terminals in British Columbia, Canada. The ships were owned by the two parent companies.

The company's open hatch ships were also well-suited for carrying containers and in the early 1970s Star Shipping provided strong competition with established container shipping lines on some routes.

In 2009, the two companies demerged the Star Shipping business with the Grieg Group keeping the business name as Grieg Star Shipping. The Canadian terminal operations also remained with Grieg. In 2017, Grieg Star formed a new joint venture pool with Gearbulk named G2 Ocean, consisting of some 130 bulk carriers.

== See also ==
- Grieg Star
