= Menominee (ship) =

There have been several ships named Menominee

- a 1967-built bulk carrier later known as Kathryn Spirit
- the former US Navy harbour tug USS Menominee (YTB-790) of 1964
- the US Navy Valiant-class tugboat USS Menominee (YTB-807) of 2011
