= Holmsund (disambiguation) =

Holmsund may refer to:

== Places ==
- Holmsund, a locality situated in Umeå Municipality in Västerbotten county, Sweden
- Holmsund, Norway, a village in Arendal Municipality in Agder county, Norway
- Holmsund, Finnmark, a village in Tana Municipality in Finnmark county, Norway

== Other ==
- IFK Holmsund, a football team from Holmsund, Sweden
- Holmsund (ship), a Swedish ship known as the Holmsund from 1967 to 1997, now called by a different name
