= Joachim Grieg =

Norwegian ship broker and politician (1849–1932)

- Born: 19 December 1849; Bergen, Norway
- Died: 7 December 1932 (aged 82)
- Occupations: ship broker and politician
- Awards: Order of St. Olav

Joachim Grieg (19 December 1849 – 7 December 1932) was a Norwegian ship broker and politician. Grieg was the founder of Joachim Grieg & Co. (now Grieg Group) one of Norway's largest ship brokerage. He was also politically and civically active both nationally and locally.

== Biography ==
Grieg was born in Bergen, Norway. He was the son of John Grieg (1819-1887) and Jutta Camilla Lous (1825-1901). Grieg was eldest of eleven siblings. He attended Bergen Cathedral School and in 1865 went to sea for 13 years, In 1868, he passed the officer's exam and in 1870 the navigation exam and in 1871 the engineer exam for masters. In 1884, he founded a ship brokerage company during the period of transition from sail to steam. Joachim Grieg & Co. (now Grieg Group) remains in operation to this day with offices in Bergen, Oslo and London.

Grieg held a number of public and civic offices. He was a board member in Den Nationale Scene from 1893 to 1928. He was acting chairman from (1903-1906) and (1925–1928). He was a member of Bergen city council and school board. In 1919 he bought Troldhaugen, the home of his cousin, Edvard Grieg. In 1923, he donated the former residence to the municipality of Fana.

He was elected to the Parliament of Norway from 1906 to 1909, representing the Liberal Left Party.

== Personal life ==
In 1879, he married Henriette Juliane Lehmkuhl (1858-1937), daughter of merchant Joachim Ehrenreich Lehmkuhl (1822-1905) and Juliane Sophie Hammer (1819-1893). He was the brother of John Grieg (1856-1905); uncle of Sigurd Jebsen Grieg (1894-1973); cousin of Edvard Grieg (1843-1907); brother-in-law of Kristofer Lehmkuhl (1855-1949). Joachim Grieg was appointed Knight of the 1st Class Order of St. Olav in 1905, won the Commander Cross of 2nd class in 1910 and had several foreign orders.

== Related reading ==
- Schreiner Johan (1963) Norsk skipsfart under krig og høykonjunktur (Cappelen Damm) ISBN 9788202074043

Cultural offices
Preceded by Christian Michelsen	Chair of the Den Nationale Scene; 1903–1906	Succeeded by Christian Kahrs
Preceded by Christian Michelsen	Chair of the Den Nationale Scene; 1925–1928	Succeeded by Jørgen Blydt
