= Rakni's Mound =

Burial mound in Norway

Coordinates: 60.1469°N 11.1366°E

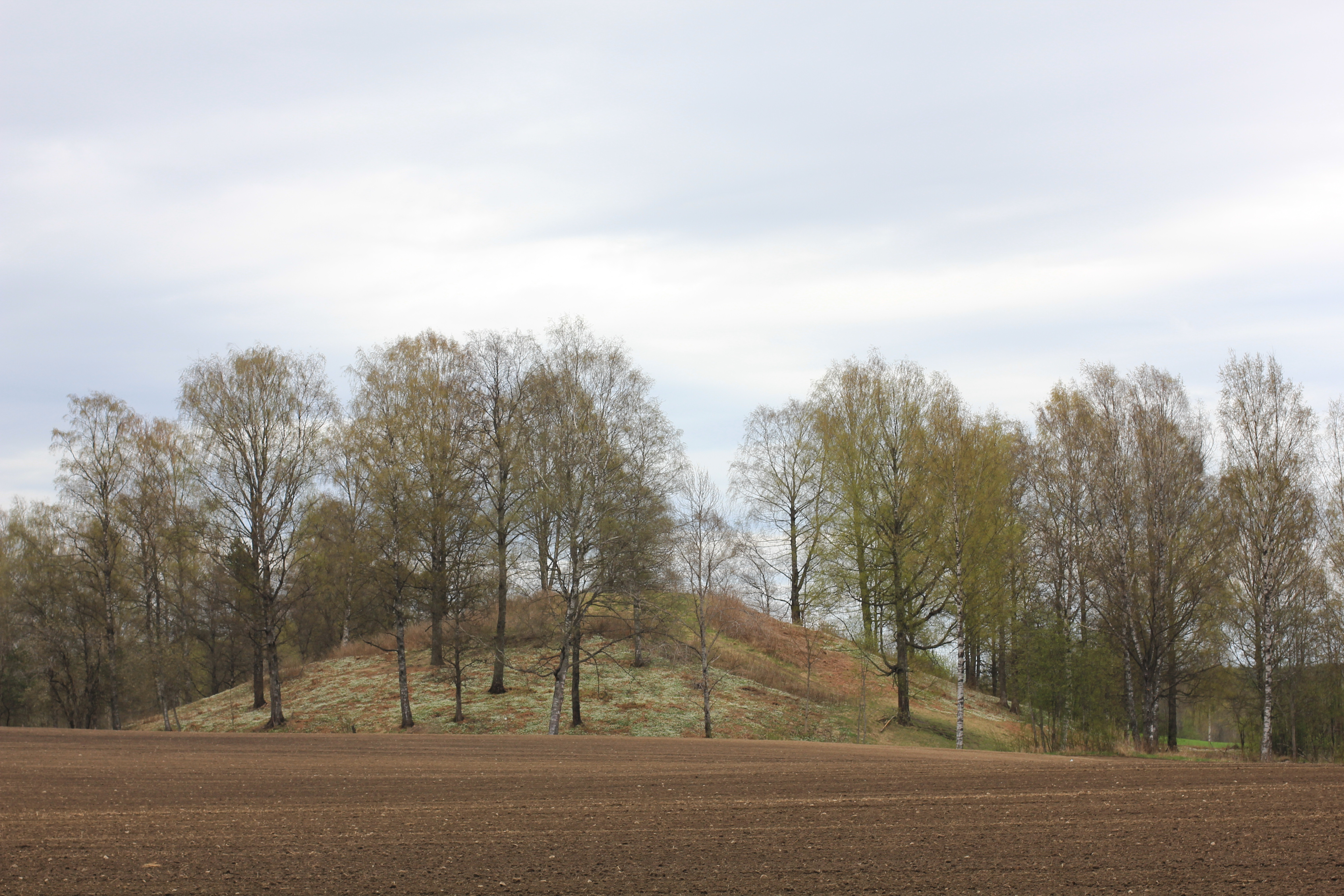
Raknehaugen; photo by Tommy Øyvind Holmstad

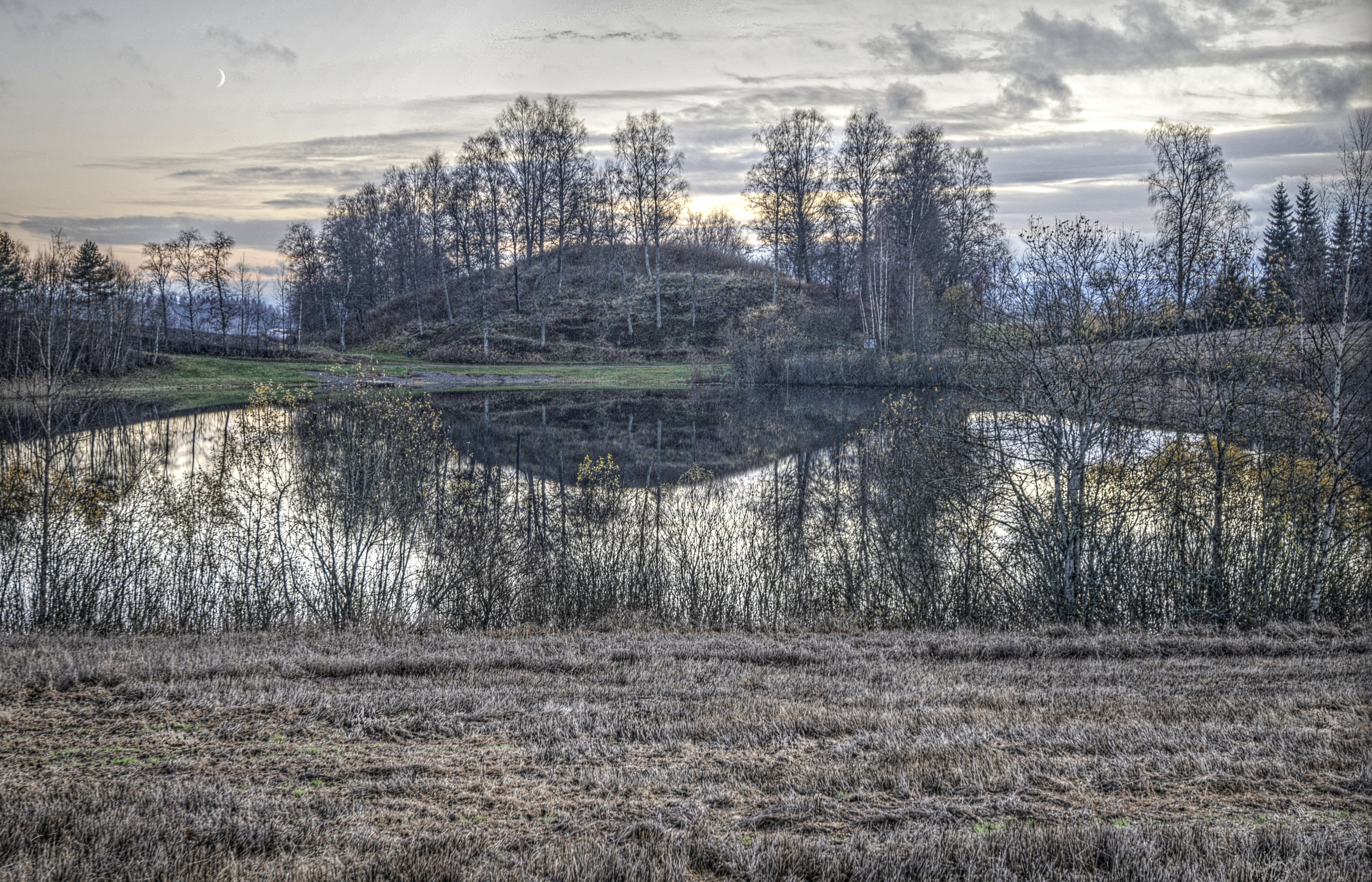
Raknehaugen; photo by Tommy Gildseth

Rakni's Mound (Norwegian: Raknehaugen) is a large mound at Ullensaker in Akershus county, Norway. It is the largest free-standing prehistoric monument in Norway and is one of the largest barrows in Northern Europe. It dates to the Migration Age and has been the subject of three archaeological investigations.

== Description and location ==
The mound is 77 metres in diameter and over 15 metres in height, the largest in Scandinavia. Carbon-14 dating in 1956–57 (the first use of the technique in Norway) dated its construction to the Migration Age, between 440 and 625. Later research has refined this to the mid-6th century, probably between 533 and 551.

It is located next to a small lake or pond near where the old road from Lake Mjøsa to Oslo and the road to Nannestad meet, probably the centre of an ancient chiefdom. The farm, which is mentioned in records from the Middle Ages, is called Ljøgodt from Ljoðgata (Old Norse for "main track"); another nearby farm, also mentioned in medieval sources, is called Haugen (from Old Norse haugr "hill; mound") after the mound. The great mound was surrounded by smaller, later burials until the early twentieth century; aerial photographs show the outlines of more than 30 now effaced mounds, and archaeological excavations have dated burials between the 7th century and the Viking Age. They were mostly simple cremations with few grave goods, and three are in the trench around the mound itself.

== Construction ==
The mound was raised over three cone-shaped layers of approximately 75,000 stacked logs from 30,000 trees, on which were heaped some 80,000 cubic metres of sand taken from trenches around the mound, clay and soil. Dendrochronology and carbon-dating show 97% of the trees were felled in a single winter, in 533–551. The construction has been estimated to have required the work of 40–50 people felling trees the winter before the mound was built, followed by 450–600 over the summer to build it; or 160–200 men working for 150 days. The trees were quite homogeneous, none over 60 years old, and had been grown in open woodland, providing the first evidence of large-scale forestry in Iron Age Scandinavia. Traces of ancient agriculture and cooking pits, which predate the mound, lie under it.

A layer of coal with animal bones and cremated human skull fragments from an individual between 20 and 35 years old were found at the base of the mound. No grave goods have been found, only a couple of wooden spades and a bar, presumably from the construction of the mound.

== Archaeological investigations ==
=== 1869–1870 ===
The first dig at the site was conducted by amateur archaeologist Anders Lund Lorange (1847–1888) over two seasons during the years 1869–70. He reached the bottom of the mound but was unsuccessful in finding a burial chamber; he did find the remains of a horse. He left a letter to future archaeologists in a sealed bottle in his second shaft, together with silver coins and two bottles of beer. He believed the mound to be a Viking Age burial.

=== 1939–1940 ===
Archeologist Sigurd Grieg (1894–1973) conducted an extensive investigation of the mound beginning in summer 1939. He found the carbon layer and the bone fragments and believed it to be from the Migration Age, which newer dating techniques later proved correct. There was great interest in the excavation; seats were built for the public to watch. In the first season, the top layer of logs were laid bare and samples taken. Shafts were dug into the mound in two directions, named the 'East Front' and 'West Front' in view of the wartime situation. Before work could resume at the site, Norway had been occupied by Nazi Germany. The German scholar Herbert Jankuhn (1905–1990) sought to place the second season's digging under the direction of the Ahnenerbe, which would have entitled the German officials to claim any finds, but Anton Wilhelm Brøgger (1884–1951), director of the Museum of National Antiquities at the University of Oslo, obtained the necessary funds from the Norwegian Directorate for Cultural Heritage and the second season's digging was supervised by Norwegians and carried out by unemployed young men.

Grieg had promised to restore the mound as it had looked before being opened. Work began in 1946 using wartime traitors and took until 1948 to complete; however, locals protested that the mound remained at least 4 metres lower than it had been. It was reconstructed again in the mid-1960s.

=== 1993 ===
Dagfinn Skre, professor in the Museum of Cultural History at the University of Oslo, reopened one of Grieg's smaller shafts to re-investigate the mound. This investigation confirmed the identification of the traces at its base as remains of prehistoric agriculture and of cooking pits, possibly from ritual meals. Analysis of pollen from the lake showed that the area has been under cultivation since approximately 2000 BCE, intensively and continuously since approximately 700 BCE (the later Bronze Age). After re-examination of Grieg's notes, Skre concluded in 1997 that the mound had contained a cremation burial and had not been merely a cenotaph or thing-place.

=== 2016 ===
In 2016, the cremated human bones from the mound were radiocarbon dated to 1290-1220 BCE, showing that they predate the mound construction by about 1800 years, again casting doubt on the function of the mound as a burial.

=== Recent analysis and theories on the origin of Raknehaugen ===
A study from 2026 challenges the traditional view of Raknehaugen as a monument to a single individual or as a burial mound. Despite extensive excavations, no unequivocal evidence of a burial has ever been found. Archaeologist Lars Gustavsen instead proposes that the mound was constructed as a collective, ritual response to a catastrophic clay landslide in the area. Using LiDAR data, an extensive landslide scar of approximately 1 km² has been identified just southwest of the mound. Gustavsen argues that the unusual layers of timber within the mound—many of the trees showing signs of having been broken or uprooted rather than cut with an axe—may originate from the actual landslide debris.

The construction of the mound, dated to around AD 552, coincides with a period marked by climatic crises following the volcanic eruptions of 536. The placement of the mound in a transitional zone between two landscape types, right at the edge of the large landslide scar, suggests that the monument functioned as a ritual remedy. The purpose of the massive communal labor effort may have been to restore cosmic and social order in a society traumatized by natural disasters, famine, and population decline. This shifts the focus from the mound as a symbol of elite power to an expression of collective ritual practice in a time of crisis.

== Uses since the 19th century ==
Early in the 19th century, the mound was acquired by the regional magistrate, Johan Koren (1758–1825), and his wife, diarist Christiane Koren (1764–1815). In 1808–1809, they built a large hexagonal stone pavilion on the top as a memorial to their son Wilhelm, who died of cholera aged 18. It was later used for dances. It was demolished around 1850; before the first excavation of the mound in 1869, the stones had been cleared away and used in building a cowshed. The Korens were members of the circle around the Norwegian Society and the mound appears as an inspiring monument in poetry and other writings of the period.

In the 20th century, the mound was sometimes the site of celebrations of Olsok, Midsummer and Norwegian Constitution Day (17 May), especially in the period of Norway's becoming independent of Sweden. In the first decade of the 21st century it was also for a while the site of ceremonies by the neo-Nazi group Vigrid.

== Association with King Rakni ==
Rakni occurs as a sea-king in skaldic poetry and the Prose Edda. The name may be the same as Ragnar. In 1743, Circuit Judge Jochum Werner reported that the mound was supposed to be the burial place of "King Ragnvold": "There are in Hovin annex, estate of Ullensaker Parish, the Houg Farm, a mighty height of Sand and soil. Old people say that King Ragnvold is buried there. Therefore, it is called Ragnvold’s Height." In a diary entry dated 29 June 1808, Christiane Koren said the king buried there was called Rakni, that the lake was supposedly created by the digging of material to make the mound, and that her kitchen-maid and another girl of similar age saw a "large black man" at the mound one night, apparently the king, insulted by his barrow being dug into and a building built on top.

Lorange was told by locals that the king had been buried in a stone chamber between two white horses, with logs piled on each other above. In fact he did find the remains of a horse, which gave off such a stench that it was still remembered in the 1940s and 1950s. However, the horse was above the top layer of logs, not below, and the story that a worker died from the smell was probably inspired by the reports about the excavation of Tutankhamun's tomb. The stone chamber may have been inspired by the pavilion built on the mound by Johan Koren. In 1927, Jan Petersen wrote that there was a legend in the village that King Rakni was buried in the mound in full armour, with a white horse, after being killed in a battle in the 7th century, and that warriors were buried in smaller mounds surrounding his; there were in fact originally many small mounds around the large one.

In the Gest's saga section of Bárðar saga Snæfellsáss, the dead King Raknar of Helluland comes to the court of King Olaf Tryggvason at Christmas and Gestr eventually destroys him and his 500 warriors in his mound in the far north; some scholars call him Rakni, and there is some uncertainty in the manuscripts.

== See also ==
- Ragnvald Heidumhære

== Sources ==
- Ebba Hult de Geer. "Raknehaugen". Universitetets Oldsaksamlings Årbok 1937. pp. 27–54
- Sigurd Grieg. "Raknehaugen". Viking 5 (1941) 1–28 (in Norwegian)
- Anders Hagen. Gåten om kong Raknes grav: Hovedtrekk i norsk arkeologi. Oslo: Cappelen, 1997. ISBN 978-82-02-16299-3 (in Norwegian) Online at National Library of Norway, accessible only from Norwegian IPs
- Dagfinn Skre. "Raknehaugen—en empirisk loftsrydding". Viking 60 (1997) 7–42 (in Norwegian)
- "Raknehaugen graves ut: Hvorfor og hvorledes arbeidet gjøres". Aftenposten 5 October 1940. p. 10 (in Norwegian) Online archive, subscription required
- "Hvad stokkene i Raknehaugen forteller". Aftenposten 11 September 1941. p. 5 (in Norwegian) Online archive, subscription required
- Bjarne Gaut "Nye analyser fra Raknehaugen". In Raknehaugen - Nord-Europas største gravhaug. Myter og fakta 2016 Nyberg BE (ed.). Raknehaugens venner: 209-211.
