= Elisabeth Grieg =

Norwegian businessperson (born 1959)

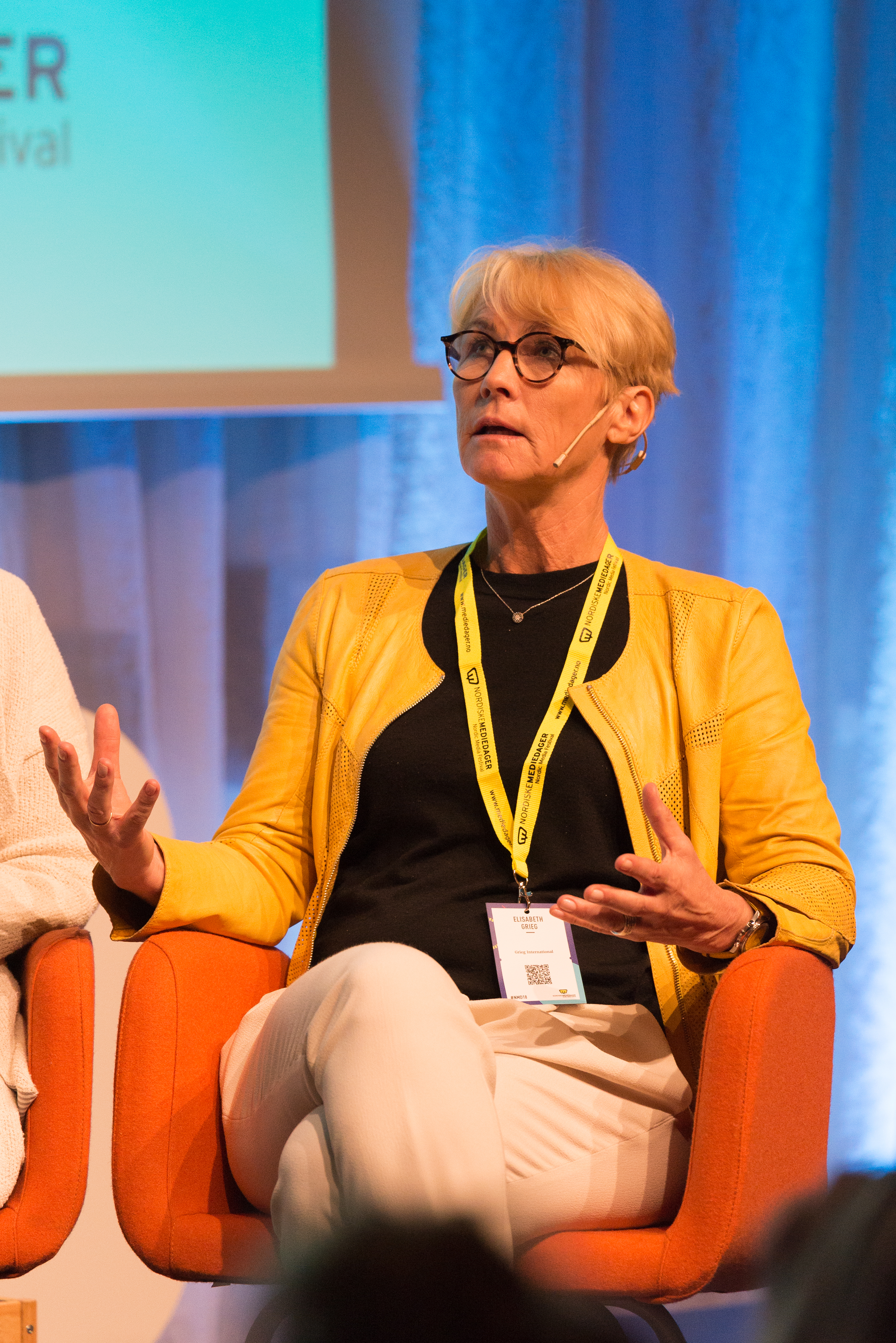
- Born: 12 June 1959; Oslo, Norway
- Occupation: Businessperson
- Title: Owner of Grieg Group
- Father: Per Grieg

Elisabeth Grieg (born 12 June 1959) is a Norwegian businessperson.

She is part owner of Grieg Group and holds many chair and board positions in the group. Outside the group she is Chairman of Norsk Hydro since 2007, deputy chair of the Norwegian Shipowners' Association and member of the board of StatoilHydro. Elisabeth Grieg is a member of the advisory board of the Sahara Forest Project.

Grieg has highlighted her commitment to the development of Norwegian business and the importance of education, for example when she gave a speech at Design Day in April 2012 focusing on design as a driver of innovation.

In 2008, the high-profile businesswoman was ranked 5th on Kapital's list of Norway's 100 most powerful women, and Grieg has been on the same list several times in recent years. She is a prominent voice in the public debate on a more equal working life, and in 2015 she received the YS Gender Equality Award.

She is a daughter of ship owner Per Grieg.
