= Hans Westfal-Larsen =

Norwegian businessman (1872–1936)

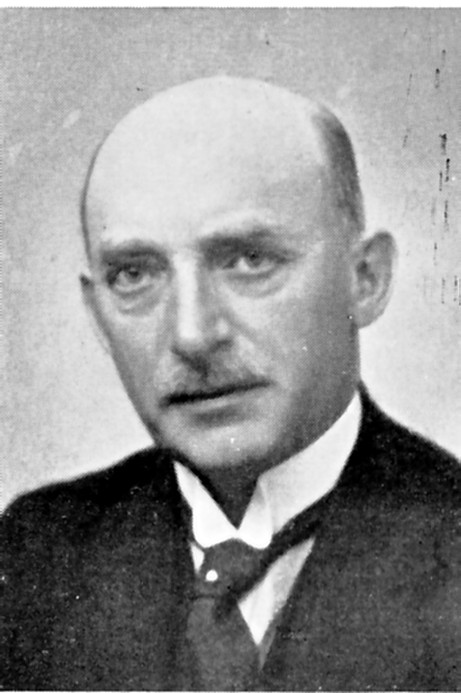
Hans Westfal-Larsen

Hans Peter Westfal-Larsen (30 April 1872 – 7 October 1936) was founder of Westfal-Larsen, a group of shipping companies based in Bergen, Norway.

== Biography ==
Hans Westfal-Larsen was born in Bergen, Norway. He was the son of Hans Peter Larsen (1830–81) and Hansine Benedicte Fredriksen (1835–1908). In 1889, he started as a clerk in the Bergen-based shipping company Rasmus F. Olsen Shipping. He eventually became a co-owner of part of the company and in 1905, he first purchased a steamship. He established the limited company Westfal-Larsen & Co. A/S in 1918 as a consolidation of several unlimited partnerships. In 1926, Westfal-Larsen started liner shipping to South America and in 1930 he established the Interocean Line which sailed between Europe and the Pacific.

== Personal life ==
He was married to Anna Fredrikke Hansen (1884–1967). They were the parents of two children. He was appointed a knight of the Order of St. Olav in 1928 and was commander of the Order of the Dannebrog. He was founder of the H. Westfal-Larsen and wife Anna Westfal-Larsen foundation (H. Westfal-Larsen og hustru Anna Westfal-Larsens Almennyttige fond). He died during 1936 in Helsingør, Denmark.

== Other sources ==
- Tore L. Nilsen (2005) A Century of Westfal-Larsen 1905–2005 (Bergen Maritime Museum) ISBN 82-7064-054-9
