= John Grieg =

Norwegian printer, publisher and bookseller (1856–1905)

John Grieg (18 August 1856 – 21 April 1905) was a Norwegian printer, publisher and bookseller.

== Biography ==
Grieg was born in Bergen, Norway. He was the son of John Grieg (1819-1887) and Jutta Camilla Lous (1825-1901).

Grieg attended Bergen Cathedral School and went abroad for further education. He studied bookstores in Copenhagen and printing operations in Gothenburg. In 1877, he returned to Bergen and worked for the printing house of his uncle, Georg Herman Grieg (1826-1910). Dating to 1721, it was the oldest publishing houses in Norway. In 1882, he took over the company under the trade name John Griegs boktrykkeri. Grieg soon made the firm one of the city's biggest and most prestigious publishing houses.

He published the magazines Samtiden which was edited by scientist Jørgen Brunchorst and Naturen edited by geologist Hans Reusch and historian Gerhard Gran. He was the publisher of Bergensposten until 1893. He also had the printing of several journals and was the initial publisher of the poets Vilhelm Krag and Sigbjørn Obstfelder.

== Personal life ==
In 1882, he married Marie Justine Agnethe Jebsen (1862–1943). He was the father of archeologist Sigurd Grieg. He was the brother of ship broker and politician Joachim Grieg and a cousin of composer Edvard Grieg. John Grieg was appointed 1st Knight of the Order of St. Olav in 1905. He died that same year at 48 years of age.
