= Sigurd Grieg =

Norwegian museologist and archeologist (1894–1973)

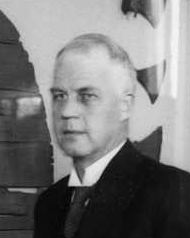
- Born: 22 August 1894; Fana, Norway
- Died: 3 November 1973 (aged 79); Lillehammer, Norway
- Occupations: Museologist and archeologist
- Parent(s): John Grieg and Marie Justine Agnethe Jebsen

Sigurd Jebsen Grieg (22 August 1894 – 3 November 1973) was a Norwegian museologist and archeologist. He was director of the Sandvig Collections at Maihaugen in Lillehammer. He is most associated with the excavation of Raknehaugen, a prehistoric burial barrow located at Ullensaker in Akershus, Norway.

== Biography ==
He was born in the borough of Fana in the city of Bergen, Norway. He was the son of Bergen-based book publisher, John Grieg (1856–1905). and Marie Justine Agnethe Jebsen (1862–1943).

He earned his Master's Degree (1923) and PhD (1926) from the University of Oslo. Then he was for several years been employed at the university's Antiquities Collection as an assistant and curator. From 1924 to 1946, he was administrative manager of the university's Antiquities Collection (Universitetets Oldsaksamling) now the Museum of Cultural History, Oslo. Grieg conducted an extensive investigation of Raknehaugen at Ullensaker beginning in summer 1939. Before work could continue at the site, Norway had been occupied by Nazi Germany.

His later research centered principally on the culture of the Middle Ages. In 1946, he took over as director of the Sandvig Collections (Sandvigske Samlinger) at Maihaugen in Lillehammer. Grieg retired at the age limit in 1964, but continued for a few more years as a museum assistant at the university's Antiquities Collection.

== Personal life ==
In 1920, Sigurd Grieg married Else Thiis (1898–1977. They had a son, John Egil Grieg (1928–2006) who became an ambassador. Sigurd Grieg was a member of the Norwegian Academy of Sciences from 1937. He was appointed a knight of the 1st class of the Order of St. Olav in 1957. Sigurd Grieg died during 1973 at Lillehammer.

== Publications ==
- Grieg, Sigurd (1924). "Norske hjelmer fra folkevandringstiden". Bergens Museums årbok 1922–1923: Historisk-antikvarisk rekke (3): 3–12.
- Grieg, Sigurd (1947). Gjermundbufunnet: En høvdingegrav fra 900-arene fra Ringerike. Norske Oldfunn. Vol. VIII. Oslo: Bergen.
