= World's largest axe =

Roadside attraction in Nackawic-Millville, New Brunswick, Canada

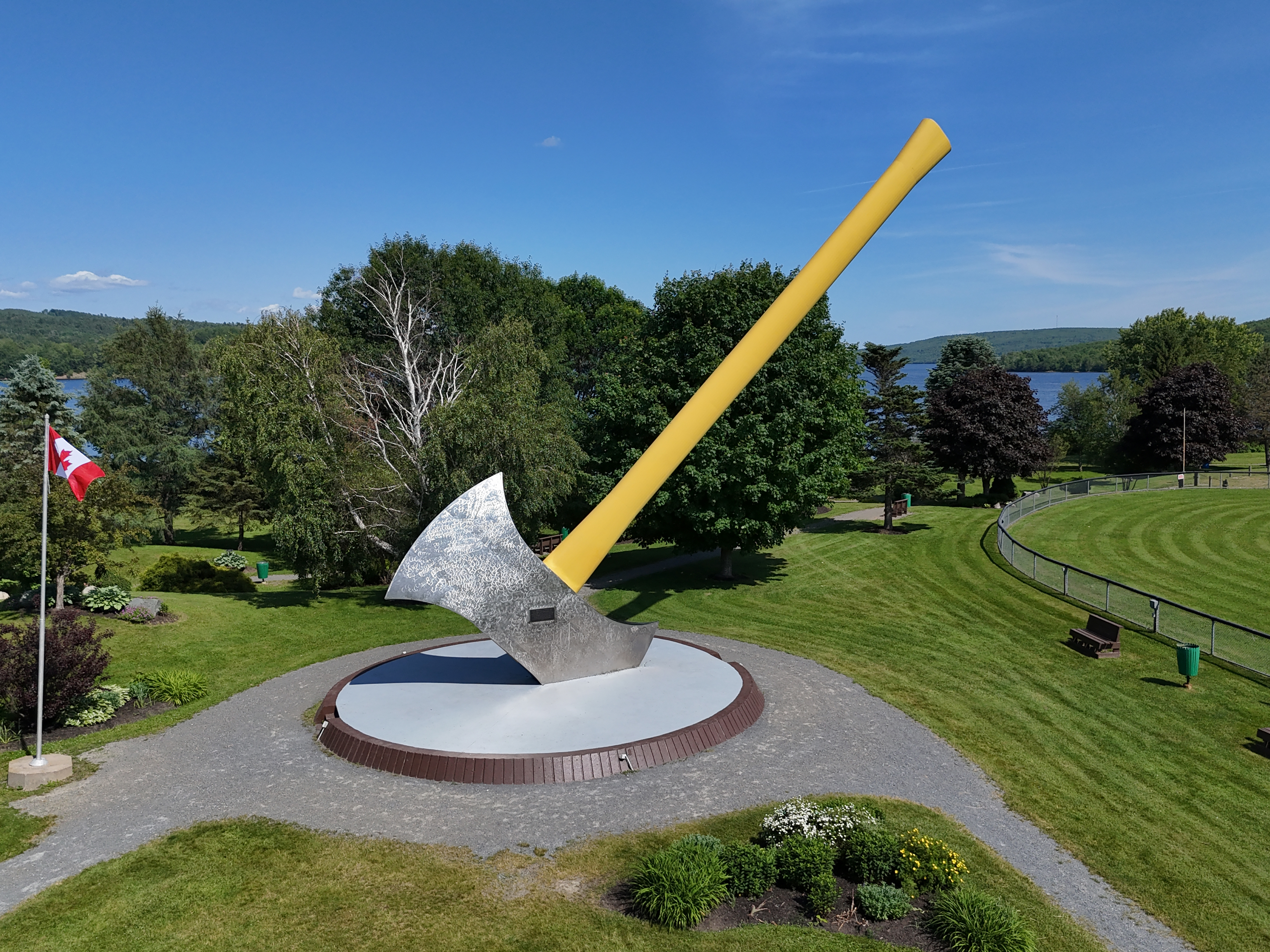
- Interactive map of World's largest axe
- Location: Nackawic-Millville, New Brunswick, Canada
- Coordinates: 45.994°N 67.233°W
- Designer: BID Canada Ltd.
- Material: Concrete, stainless steel
- Completion date: May 11, 1991
- Dedicated to: The forest industry in Nackawic and throughout New Brunswick

The world's largest axe is a sculpture of an axe located in Nackawic-Millville, New Brunswick, Canada. It was built in 1991, the year Nackawic was designated the Forestry Capital of Canada, as a monument to symbolize the significance of the forest industry in Nackawic and throughout New Brunswick. Additionally, the head of the axe contains a time capsule embedded within it. The axe sits in a park located off the Saint John River, which is the host location of the annual Big Axe Craft Beer Festival.

The axe stands 15 metres (49 ft) tall and weighs over 55 tons. The axe-head is 7 metres (23 ft) wide. The concrete stump is 10 metres (33 ft) in diameter. It was commissioned, designed and built in 1991 by the B.I.D. Canada LTD. company in Woodstock. It was presented to the town on May 11, 1991 and lifted by crane to its stump.

== Plaque ==
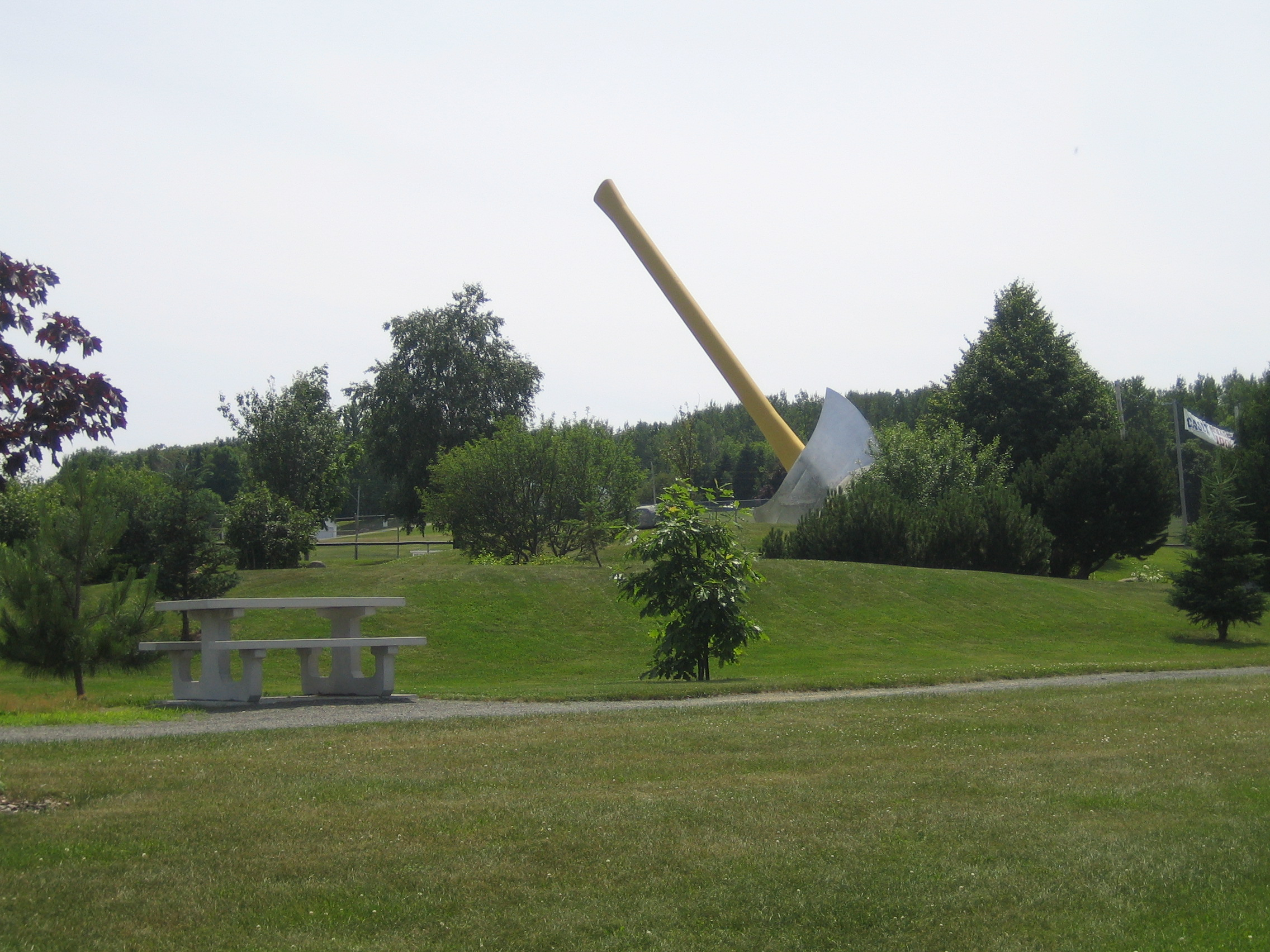
Axe and Park in 2005

"The World's Largest Axe. This giant axe symbolizes the importance of the forest industry, past, present and future, to the Town of Nackawic and the Province of New Brunswick. 1991."

== See also ==
List of world's largest roadside attractions
