= Masterbulk =

Shipping company

Masterbulk Pte. Ltd.
- Company type: Subsidiary
- Industry: Ship Transport
- Founded: 1995
- Headquarters: Singapore
- Area served: Global
- Key people: Nicholas F. Fisher (CEO)
- Products: Break bulk cargo
- Number of employees: 11 (2016)
- Parent: Armadora AS
- Subsidiaries: Westfal-Larsen Shipping Pte Ltd, Saga Welco AS
- Website: www.masterbulk.com.sg

Masterbulk Private Limited is a shipping company which was established in Singapore in February 1995 following a major spin off from the Bergen, Norway-based Westfal-Larsen & Co A/S, of which it remains a subsidiary.

The Company owns a total of 18 open hatch general cargo vessels. Its fleet operates in the drybulk segment and is involved in the transportation of unitised, bulk cargo and break bulk cargo worldwide, specialising in bale pulp and forestry products, steel products, and project cargo.

The technical management of these vessels is outsourced to Zeaborn Ship Management (Singapore) Pte Ltd and Westfal-Larsen Management AS. The commercial management is performed by Pool Manager Saga Welco AS, in Tenvik, Norway, which is a joint venture along with Saga Shipholding (Norway) AS. The Saga Welco Pool manages the largest and youngest fleet of Open Hatch Gantry Crane vessels in the market, which currently includes 52 vessels, with 1 on order. Masterbulk is based in Singapore and has 9 employees.

In 2014 Masterbulk established a new venture with fellow Norwegian shipowners Saga Shipholding to operate their fleets of open hatch gantry and jib-craned bulkers in a joint pool, Saga Welco.
