= Kathryn Spirit =

History
- Name: Holmsund (1967–1997); Menominee (1997–2006); Kathryn Spirit (2006–2013)
- Owner: SCA Transport/Transforest, Sundsvall, Sweden (1967–1993); Gorthon Lines, Sundsvall (1993–1997); Great Lakes-European Shipping, Norway (1997–2006); McKeil Marine, Hamilton, Ontario (2006–2011)
- Builder: Lindholmens, Gothenburg, Sweden
- Yard number: 1101
- Launched: 26 May 1967
- Christened: Sigrid Mossberg
- Completed: 1967
- Out of service: 2011
- Identification: IMO number: 6717069
- Fate: Scrapped

General characteristics
- Tonnage: 9,261 GRT; 12,300 DWT
- Length: 153.4 m (503 ft 3 in) loa
- Beam: 20.2 m (66 ft 3 in)
- Draught: 8.4 m (27 ft 7 in)
- Depth: 11.2 m (36 ft 9 in)
- Installed power: 8,000 bhp (6,000 kW)
- Propulsion: 2 diesel engines, 1 screw
- Speed: 16.5 knots (30.6 km/h; 19.0 mph)

The ship Kathryn Spirit was a 12,300 dwt open hatch bulk carrier built in 1967. She was registered in Canada and previously owned by Swedish and Norwegian interests as Holmsund and Menominee. In 2011 her intended demolition in Canada proved controversial and proposals were made for her to instead be broken up in Mexico. The intended Mexican contractor collapsed, and so she stayed beached. In December 2017, work was done to patch and seal the ship, and to decontaminate it before the beginning of dismantlement operation. Her demolition was completed in October 2018.

== Trading career ==
Kathryn Spirit was built as Swedish-flag Holmsund in 1967 by AB Lindholmens varv at Gothenburg, Sweden for SCA Transport, later SCA Transforest, the shipping arm of Svenska Cellulosa Aktiebolaget. Holmsund and her two sister ships Tunadal and Munksund were open hatch bulk carriers, with their own gantry cranes, designed for SCA's pulp and forest products exports, in a new integrated transport system utilising the company's own terminals. Holmsund was operated by SCA for some 26 years and then sold to Swedish shipowner Gorthon Lines.

In 1997 Holmsund was sold to a Norwegian operator for service between the Great Lakes and Europe, and renamed Menominee. McKeil Marine Ltd of Hamilton, Ontario purchased Menominee in 2006, renaming her Kathryn Spirit and transferring her to Canadian registry.

She was primarily used for the transport of bulk commodities on the Great Lakes and Saint Lawrence Seaway. In 2007 Kathryn Spirit became the first ship to be used to ship wheat from the Port of Churchill to another Canadian domestic port, Halifax, Nova Scotia.

== Disposal ==
In 2011, after a period of lay-up, Kathryn Spirit was sold to the Groupe St-Pierre for scrapping. The company decided that they would carry out the demolition at Beauharnois in the Greater Montreal Area, Quebec, on the shores of Lake Saint-Louis. The mayor of Beauharnois opposed the operation, even though it would take place in an area zoned for industry, due to fears about environmental pollution. His concerns were shared by Member of Parliament Anne Minh-Thu Quach.

In August 2012, in the face of continued opposition from the municipality, the Quebec Ministry of the Environment and environmental groups, the Groupe St-Pierre decided to withdraw from the demolition project and resold Kathryn Spirit to the Mexican company Recyclajes Ecológicos Marítimos. The American-owned, Bolivian-flagged tug Craig Trans, built in 1944, was hired to tow her to Mexico, but was detained at Halifax by Transport Canada due to safety deficiencies and poor living conditions. The tug's crew were later repatriated with charitable donations, and the tug arrested by creditors.

By May 2013 there were further delays in the departure of Kathryn Spirit, due to water ingress, lack of survey for the voyage and other environmental concerns, and a fear that lower water levels might prevent her departure until 2014. In January 2016 the condition of the ship, unmoved, had deteriorated to a serious extent, causing concern about potential pollution of the St. Lawrence River. A committee made up of federal and provincial representatives suggested that the ship be broken up without moving the ship.

In January 2018 work started in Beauharnois, and was ongoing on April 10, 2018 when the vessel caught fire and burned for several hours.
