= Westfal-Larsen =

Norwegian shipping company group

- Industry: Shipping
- Founded: 1905
- Headquarters: Bergen, Norway
- Area served: Global
- Key people: Rolf Westfal-Larsen, Hans Peder Westfal-Larsen, Rolf Westfal-Larsen Jr
- Number of employees: 1,100 (2007)
- Website: wlco.no

Westfal-Larsen is a group of shipping companies based in Bergen, Norway, owning 20 open hatch ships and 12 chemical tankers.

The group's main activities also include investment as well as ship technical and commercial management. Among the subsidiaries are Masterbulk which owns and manages the fleet of open-hatch ships, and its wholly owned subsidiary Westfal-Larsen Shipping AS commercial management. The main company in the group is Skibsaktieselskapet Navigation Co Ltd while most of the shipping activities is performed by Westfal-Larsen & Co. AS. The group was founded by Hans Westfal-Larsen in 1905.

In 1939, Cosmopolitan Shipping Company lost the Southern Cross Line to Westfal-Larsen & Company. Westfal-Larsen & Company also operated the Interocean Line and County Line. The lines were closed in the 1960s.

During World War II Westfal-Larsen operated a fleet of 36 ships, 22 ships were lost during the war.
