= Chris Simpson (cardiologist) =

Canadian cardiologist

Chris Simpson FRCPC FCAHS
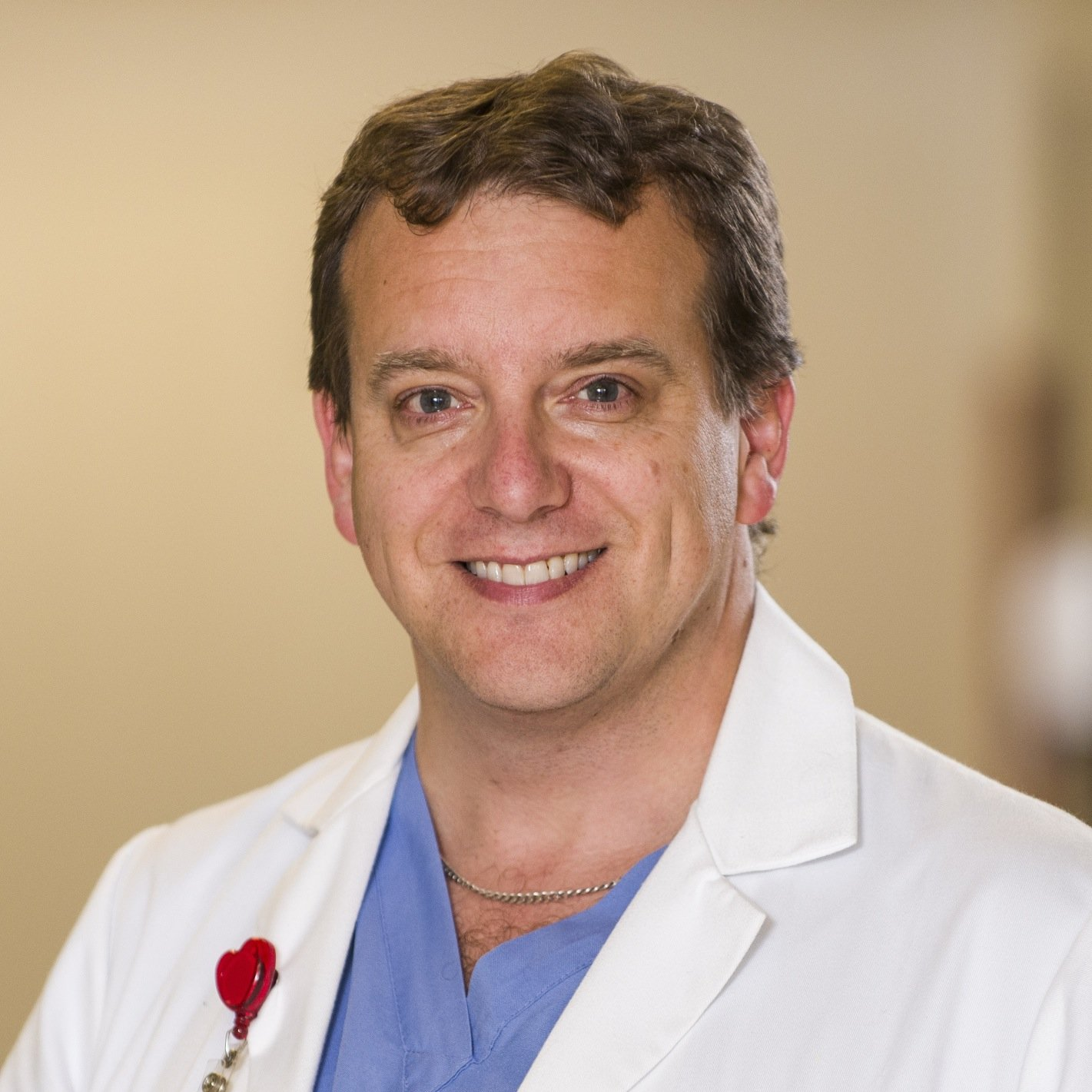

Personal details
- Born: 1967 (age 58–59)
- Occupation: Cardiologist

Chris Simpson (born 1967) is a Canadian cardiologist who served as the 147th President of the Canadian Medical Association (2014–2015). During his tenure, he championed seniors' care, arguing that a more comprehensive and integrated approach to the care of seniors would serve as a foundation for improving the Canadian healthcare system as a whole. Other issues during his term included a national discussion on end of life care (that coincided with a Supreme Court of Canada ruling that struck down the ban on medical aid in dying (MAID) and new legislation allowing MAID), as well as issues around the public health implications and possible medicinal utility of cannabis.

Simpson served as the Chair of the Wait Time Alliance – a federation of 18 national medical and surgical specialty societies, the Canadian College of Family Physicians and the Canadian Medical Association that monitored and published report cards on the state of medical wait times in Canada. He also chaired the Task Force on CMAJ that was tasked with revamping the governance structure of the Canadian Medical Association Journal. In 2020-21, he served as President of the Canadian Academy of Health Sciences.

He served as Vice-Dean (Clinical) in the Faculty of Health Sciences at Queen's University in Kingston as well as the medical director of the Southeastern Ontario Academic Medical Organization (SEAMO) from 2016 to 2021. He served as a Canadian Medical Association representative to the World Medical Association (2017–2019). Currently, he serves as Executive Vice President (Medical) and Chief Medical Officer at Ontario Health - the Crown agency that oversees the health care system in Ontario.

== Education and training ==
A native of Nackawic, New Brunswick, he received his MD from Dalhousie University in 1992 after having completed an undergraduate degree (BSc) at the University of New Brunswick. He then completed Internal Medicine and Cardiology training at Queen's University, followed by a Heart and Stroke Foundation Fellowship in cardiac electrophysiology at the University of Western Ontario in 1999. He is a Professor in the Department of Medicine and in the School of Policy Studies at Queen's University and completed a 10-year term as Chief of Cardiology and medical director of the Cardiac Programs at Kingston General Hospital and Hotel Dieu Hospital in 2016.

== Clinical and research work ==
Simpson practices clinically as a specialist in heart rhythm disorders. His clinical and research interests include health policy (particularly access to care, wait times, seniors' care and health human resources), medical fitness to drive, catheter ablation, atrial fibrillation, inherited heart rhythm diseases, cardiac resynchronization therapy, and leadless pacemaker technology.

== Honours, awards and elected positions ==
- 2004: Canadian Medical Association Award for Young Leaders
- 2015: Fellowship in the Canadian Academy of Health Sciences
- 2017: University of New Brunswick Alumni Award of Distinction
