= Braided =

Canadian musical group

- Origin: Canada
- Genres: Pop, folk, rock
- Years active: 2005–2008
- Label: Mark Lalama Music
- Past members: Casey LeBlanc; Ashley Leitão; Amber Fleury
- Website: www.myspace.com/braidedmusic

Braided is a musical group consisting of Casey LeBlanc, Ashley Leitão, and Amber Fleury, who all competed on the third season of Canadian Idol in 2005. They are the third music group to come from an Idol show in the world, after Young Divas from Australia and Feminnem from Croatia.

== History ==
During the 2005 Canadian Idol contest, Leitao came in ninth, Fleury in eighth, and LeBlanc in fifth. The three were brought together by producer and Idol accompanist Mark Lalama, at the suggestion of his brother Paul. The band's name was chosen because the group "braids" elements from across the country into one.

Braided began recording in Lalama's studio at his farmhouse in Fenwick, Ontario. The single "A Little Bit Closer" was released in June 2006. Their debut album, Casey, Ashley and Amber, was released in August. Figure skater Elvis Stojko sang a duet with Leitao on the track "Before You". The group toured during 2006–07 to promote the album.

== Critical reception ==
Bob Mersereau, writing in the Telegraph-Journal, gave them a mixed review, writing that producer and songwriter Mark Lalama "gives them some cool 'girl-group' '60s material which is bright and fun. But there's also some schmaltz, ballad material that Celine Dion would pass on."

== Discography ==
=== Albums ===
- Casey, Ashley and Amber (August 2006)

=== Singles ===
- "A Little Bit Closer"
