= Grieg Group =

Norwegian shipping and investment corporation

- Type: Private
- Industry: Maritime
- Headquarters: Bergen, Norway
- Area served: Global
- Revenue: 6,765 million NOK (2020)
- Number of employees: 1710 (2020)
- Website: grieg.no

Grieg Group is a family-owned business headquartered in Bergen, Norway.

== History ==
In 1884, Joachim Grieg established a shipbroking firm in Bergen, where the company continued to develop during the two world wars. In 1960, Per Grieg Sr. joined the company and organized it into a specialized business. Today the group, made up of several companies worldwide, is owned and led by members of the 4th and 5th generation of the Grieg family.

The Grieg Group operates within seafood, shipping, shipbroking, maritime innovation, logistics, and investments.

The Grieg Group has 1710 employees and operates from Norway (the company's headquarters) to the rest of Europe, the US, Canada and Asia. The Grieg family owns the Grieg Group through their holding company, Grieg Maturitas (75%), and Grieg Foundation (nonprofit organization, 25%).

== Companies ==
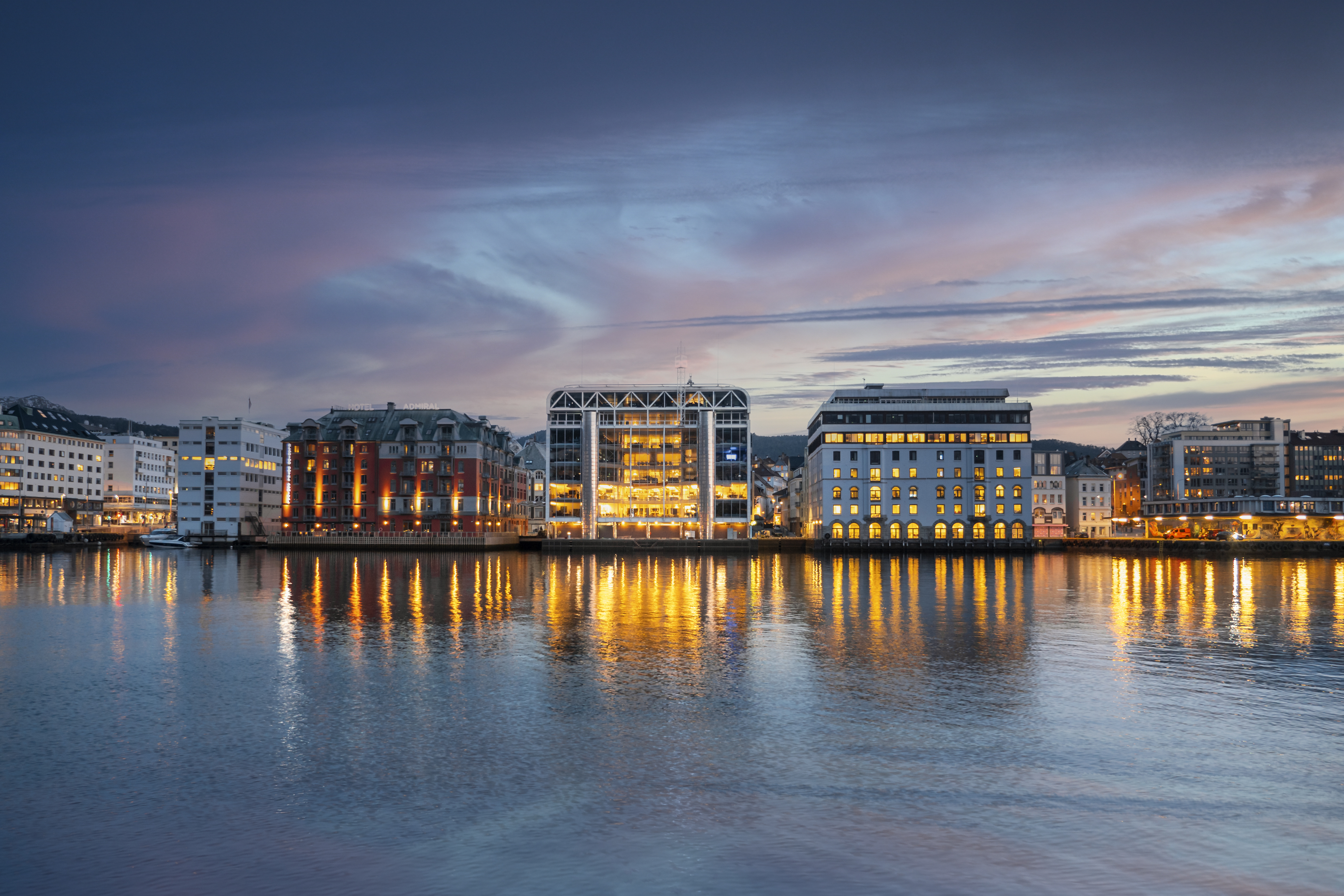
Grieg Group main office (right), Bergen, Norway

=== Grieg Maturitas ===
The Grieg Group's holding company owns 75% of the Grieg Group. Elisabeth Grieg is chair of the board.

=== Grieg Maritime Group ===
Grieg Maritime Group started as a shipping company in the early 1960s, building up a fleet of multipurpose vessels. Grieg Star is still one of the major operators within the open hatch shipping segment through G2 Ocean, the Grieg Group's joint venture with Gearbulk and the largest open hatch shipping company. Today, the company is organized into separate and semi-autonomous companies. Through Grieg Ship-owning and Grieg Star, Grieg Maritime Group develops ship-owning and ship management operations, and provides sustainability services to the maritime sector through its subsidiaries Grieg Edge and Grieg Green.

=== Grieg Logistics ===
Grieg Logistics is a provider of ship services and industrial terminal operations to the oil and gas, shipping, offshore, maritime and general industries. In Norway, Grieg Logistics serves the country with a large number of local offices. Grieg Logistics is organized into business areas, covering Grieg Strategic Services, Grieg Connect, Mosjøen Industriterminal, and Grieg Ships Services.

=== Grieg Kapital ===
Grieg Kapital is an investment and asset management company within the Grieg Group. The company's mandate is to safeguard and develop its financial asset portfolio.

=== Grieg Investor ===
Grieg Investor is a Norwegian-based independent institutional investment consulting practice. The company's core business activities are long-term investment policies, manager selection and consolidated reporting. Grieg Investor has offices in Oslo, Stavanger, and Trondheim. the company is 55% owned by the Grieg Group and 45% by the employees of Grieg Investor. Grieg Investor is authorized and regulated by the Financial Supervisory Authority of Norway (Finanstilsynet). Grieg Investor's clients are purely institutional, such as pension funds, family offices, municipalities, insurance companies and foundations.

=== Grieg Shipbrokers ===
Grieg Shipbrokers is a provider of shipbroking services and was the first company to be established by the Grieg Group back in 1884. Grieg Shipbrokers operates worldwide, with offices in Bergen, Oslo and London.

=== Grieg Aqua ===
Grieg Aqua is one of the world's leading salmon farming companies, targeting 80,000 tonnes of harvest in 2021 (excluding Shetland) and 130,000 tonnes in 2025. Grieg Seafood's farms are in Finnmark and Rogaland in Norway, British Columbia and Newfoundland in Canada, and Shetland in the UK. The company's headquarters is located in Bergen, Norway. More than 1000 people work in the company. Sustainable farming practices are the foundation of Grieg Seafood's operations. The lowest possible environmental impact and the best possible fish welfare are both an ethical responsibility and part of the drive toward economic profitability. Towards 2025, Grieg Seafood aims for global growth and cost improvements and to evolve from a pure salmon supplier to a partner for selected customers. The company was listed on the Oslo Stock Exchange on 21 June 2007. Through Grieg Aqua, the Grieg Group owns 50.17% of the shares in Grieg Seafood.
