= Open hatch general cargo =

Type of cargo ship

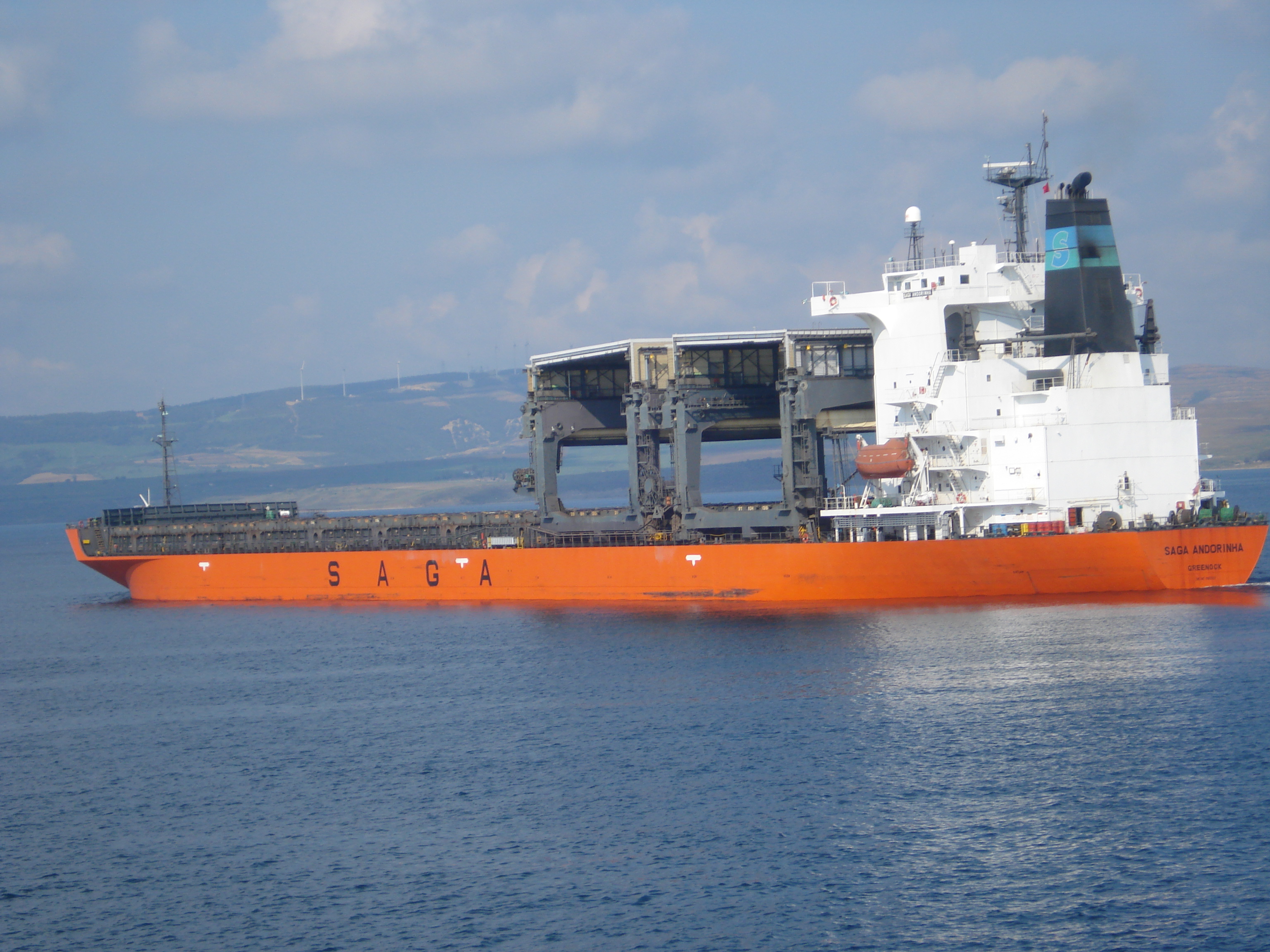
OHGC ship Saga Andorinha, with its two gantry cranes positioned in front of the superstructure

Open-hatch general cargo (OHGC) is a type of ship designed to transport forest products, bulk cargos, unitized cargoes, project cargoes and containers.

== Description ==
The vessel is typically fitted with two gantry cranes for self-loading and -unloading, with a typical safe working load (SWL) between 30 and 80 tons. Different equipment is connected to the gantry crane depending on cargo type as vacuum clamps for paper, unihook for unitised cargo, container frame and grab for bulk cargoes. Cargo holds are box-shaped to fit containers and some holds can be equipped with tweendecks to improve flexibility of cargo mixture in same hold. Holds are typically equipped with dehumidifier for sensitive cargo. Cargo hatch covers for holds are opened and closed by mean of gantry crane. Space on those hatch covers can also be used to carry containers, lumber or project cargoes.

Modern open-hatch general cargo ships feature advanced designs to enhance efficiency and accommodate diverse cargo types. Gantry cranes with automated systems enable faster, safer loading and unloading, reducing turnaround time in ports. The box-shaped cargo holds allow seamless handling of containers and bulk and breakbulk goods.

To meet international environmental standards, many vessels include ballast water treatment systems to prevent the spread of invasive species. Enhanced tweendeck configurations support cargo segregation and optimized weight distribution, while reinforced hatch covers accommodate heavy or oversized project cargo. Adjustable dehumidifier systems ensure safe transport of moisture-sensitive goods, making these ships versatile assets in global trade.
