= Open hatch bulk carrier =

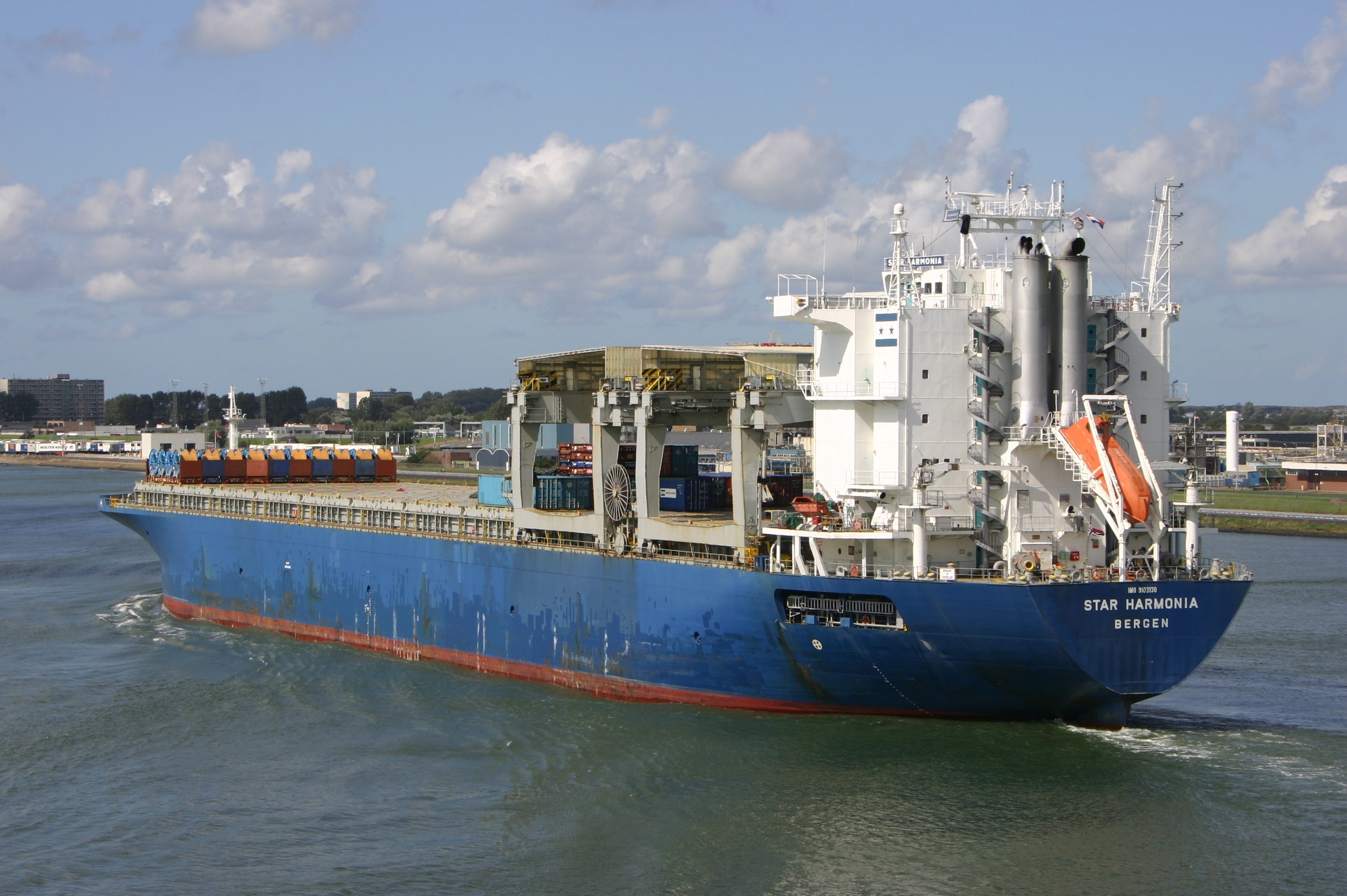
MS Star Harmonia, a 46,000-ton DWT open hatch bulk carrier; two gantry cranes are positioned in front of its superstructure, 2015

Open hatch bulk carriers, often referred to as OHBCs or conbulkers, are specialized bulk carriers designed to offer direct access to the hold through cargo hatches which extend the full width of the vessel. As a result, large cargo units can be lowered into place. If it is possible, the holds or hatches are designed around standard cargo unit sizes. Sometimes gantry cranes are fitted. There is special attention for cargo-handling shipping gear.

These conbulkers are expensive because there is extra steel necessary to widen the hatches. This is crucial to provide strength. The open hatches are useful for forest products, such as pre-slung lumber (timber) and logs. The heavy units are more easy to handle than in a conventional bulk carrier.

The open hatch bulk carriers can also be used to carry containers on the outward leg, and dry bulk on the return leg. The first open hatch bulk carrier was built in 1962, for the use of paper trade.

== OHBC types as forest product carriers ==
The Open Hatch Bulk Carriers hypernym generally refers to the following ship types:

Woodchip carriers
These vessels are used for carrying large volumes of woodchips. Woodchips can only be stored within the watertight cargo holds. Some of the ships are fitted with gantry cranes and grab buckets, as well as wings with conveyor belts on deck, though shore-based pneumatic handling equipment is often used.

Lumber (timber) carriers

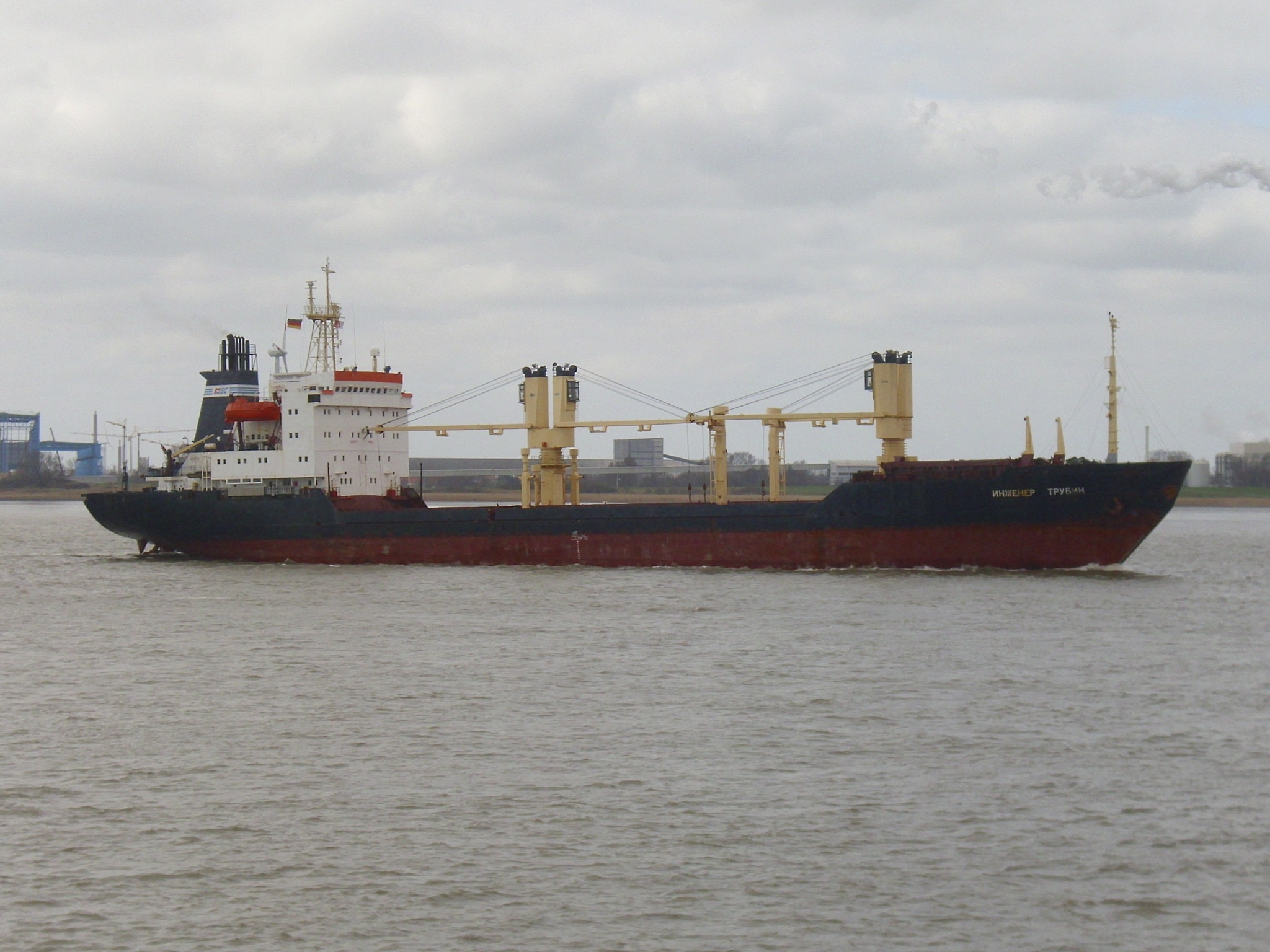
MS Inzhener Trubin, a 7,000-tonne DWT timber carrier, 2013

These ships are designed to carry packaged sawn lumber (timber), logs (bundled or loose), and other forest products. Lumber (timber) and logs are stored inside holds below the deck, and can also be stored on the main deck subject to safety restrictions. Therefore, the machinery spaces and accommodations of these vessels are usually located aft to provide a clear cargo deck area. They often have cranes that can lift up to 25 tonnes of logs.

Wood pulp carriers
These vessels are designed for transport of wood pulp, the carriage of which requires the ship to comply with stringent requirements. Wood pulp are stored inside specially designed holds below the deck. Therefore, it is necessary that all holds are in top condition (clean, dry, no loose paint and no rust) and are generally fitted with dehumidification systems.

Hybrid configuration (HyCon) bulk carriers
This design has been developed for the new generation, seeking for further safety and the improvement of cargo handling of bulk carrier, and is based on IACS Unified Rule for Bulk Carrier Safety. These vessels are double sides in the fore and aftmost holds, whereas the other holds remain single sided. Double sides reduce the possibility of damage to areas that require additional strengthening without greatly increasing the lightship weight.

== See also ==
- Open hatch general cargo
