= Brandon Brewer =

Canadian boxer

Personal information
- Nicknames: L-Jack; Lumberjack
- Born: October 22, 1984 (age 41) Fredericton, New Brunswick, Canada
- Height: 5 ft 10 in (178 cm)
- Weight: Light Middleweight Middleweight

Boxing career
- Reach: 75 in (191 cm)
- Stance: Orthodox

Boxing record
- Total fights: 28
- Wins: 25
- Win by KO: 11
- Losses: 1
- Draws: 2
- No contests: 0

Brandon Brewer is a professional boxer from Fredericton, New Brunswick, and the most recent Canadian light middleweight champion. He was born on October 22, 1984, and grew up in Prince William, New Brunswick. Beginning in 2009, he fought nine fights as an amateur boxer before turning professional in 2011. Many Boxing pundits have criticized Brewers choice of opponents. Boxing legend George Foreman called him the "brightest shining can opener in Canada". Brewer faced off against Antonio Napolitano for the WBC Middleweight title, which ended in a draw leaving the title vacant.

== Fight history and accomplishments ==
Brewer signaled his potential early on when he won the Atlantic Canada Fighter of the Year in 2012 and 2013. In 2012, he won the Canadian Fight of the Year in a match with Francis Lafrenière, which ended in a draw. Also in 2012, he won the New Generation Middleweight Title against Mike Stauffer. In 2013, he went on to beat Lafreniere to win the National Boxing Authority Eastern Canadian Title. In the same year, The Canadian Professional Boxing Council ranked Brewer as top middleweight fighter in Canada. In 2014, Brewer won the Canadian Professional Boxing Council Light Middleweight Title against Paul Bzdel.

Brewer made his international debut with four fights in New England, improving his record to 13-0-1 by May 2015. After amassing three more victories, Brewer was pitted against Toronto's Junmar Emon for the vacant NABA Canadian super welterweight title, winning a closely contested bout via unanimous decision. By June 2019, Brewer had run his undefeated streak to 24 fights, earning the New Brunswick pugilist a fight against Mark DeLuca on the undercard of Demetrius Andrade's WBO middleweight title defense against Maciej Sulęcki, live on DAZN. DeLuca won a hard-fought ten-round decision, marking the end of Brewer's undefeated record.

In December 2019, Brewer signed with Three Lions Promotions. On March 19, 2022, he faced undefeated stablemate Antonio Napolitano, battling the promising up-and-comer to an eight-round split draw. The undercard seen fellow maritimer Ryan Rozicki win by first round KO against German Montes alongside the promising former Olympic hopeful and Canadian national five time national champion John Michael Bianco, who made his pro debut winning by Unanimous decision.

== Fight style and inspiration ==
Brewer is known for his fast footwork, elusiveness, and ability to out-think his opponents. He names Floyd Mayweather, Bernard Hopkins, and Andre Ward as boxing influences. His fighting style is boxer-puncher.
