= Saint Marys Parish, New Brunswick =

Saint Marys Saint Mary's, St, Mary's, St. Marys
- Parish
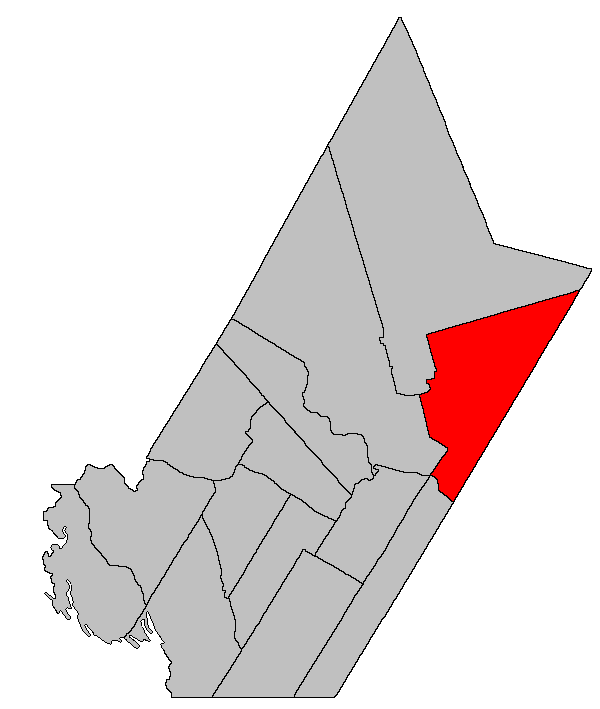
- Location within York County, New Brunswick. map incorrectly includes part of Fredericton in Saint Marys
- Coordinates: 46.205°N 66.505°W
- Country: Canada
- Province: New Brunswick
- County: York
- Erected: 1786

Area
  - Land: 751.90 km^{2} (290.31 sq mi)

Population (2021)
  - Total: 5,084
  - Density: 6.8/km^{2} (18/sq mi)
  - Change 2016-2021: ▲5.1%
  - Dwellings: 2,030
- Time zone: UTC-4 (AST)
  - Summer (DST): UTC-3 (ADT)
- Figures do not include portions within the city of Fredericton and the Devon 30 Indian reserve

Saint Marys is a geographic parish in York County, New Brunswick, Canada.

Prior to the 2023 governance reform, for governance purposes it was divided between the city of Fredericton, the Indian reserve of Devon 30, and the local service district of the parish of Saint Marys, of which the city and the LSD were members of Capital Region Service Commission (RSC11). The LSD includes the special service areas of Evergreen Park and Pepper Creek.

== Origin of name ==
The parish was settled in part by Loyalists from Maryland.

St. Mary's County, Maryland was established well before the American Revolution and may have been the source of some of the Loyalists.

== History ==
Saint Marys was erected in 1786 as one of York County's original parishes. The parish ran thirty miles inland and extended to the Keswick River.

In 1824 part of Saint Marys was included in the newly erected Douglas Parish.

In 1837 part of Saint Marys was included in the newly erected Stanley Parish.

In 1838 Stanley was dissolved and its territory implicitly returned to its original parishes.

In 1847 part of Saint Marys was included in a new, much larger Stanley Parish.

In 1945 the town of Devon was annexed by Fredericton. The boundary description of Saint Marys in the Territorial Division Act (TDA) implicitly removes the area from Saint Marys but the Fredericton entry in the TDA is not updated.

In 1952 two grants were transferred to Saint Marys from Douglas. The boundary description of Fredericton was also updated, removing any ambiguity. The modern boundaries of Fredericton are not reflected in the TDA, having changed after the last revision of the Act.

== Boundaries ==
Saint Marys Parish is bounded:

- on the north beginning at a point about 650 metres north-northwesterly of Red Rock Branch Road and 900 metres west-southwesterly of Route 107, at the northwestern corner of Loyalist grants along the Nashwaak River, then running easterly along the grant lines and their prolongation to the Sunbury County line, about 1.1 kilometres southwest of Cains River;
- on the southeast by the Sunbury County line, running southwesterly to the Saint John River;
- on the southwest by the Saint John River and a line beginning on the north bank of the Nashwaak River at the prolongation of Irvine Street, then northwesterly along Irvine Street, Eco Terra Drive, and the prolongation of Eco Terra Drive to meet the prolongation of Douglas Avenue near Ring Road; (Note: The Territorial Division Act uses the boundaries of Fredericton before the 1973 amalgamations.)
- on the west by a line running northeasterly along the prolongation of Douglas Avenue to the southwestern line of the Devon 30 Indian reserve, then northwest (Note: By the magnet of 1850, when declination in the area was between 18º and 19º west of north. The Territorial Division Act clause referring to magnetic direction bearings was omitted in the 1952 and 1973 Revised Statutes.) about 5 kilometres along the reserve and its prolongation to the eastern line of a grant to Daniel Sawyer, about 2.3 kilometres west of Route 148, then north about 10 kilometres to the South Branch Dunbar Stream, then easterly about 1.25 kilometres down the South Branch Dunbar to the western line of a grant to Samuel and John Casey, (Note: Both cadastral map No. 114 and mapbook 328 show the Casey grant being part of Saint Marys, although Casey wasn't part of either Loyalist group grant along the Nashwaak. The Casey grant was made in 1811, more than twenty years before Stanley Parish was first erected to encompass the lands of the New Brunswick and Nova Scotia Land Company.) then northerly about 1.4 kilometres and easterly about 1.6 kilometres around the Casey grant to meet the rear line of the Loyalist grants along the Nashwaak, then northerly along the Loyalist grants, including a grant to Alexander Drummond along the English Settlement Road, (Note: Mapbook 328 erroneously includes the Drummond grant with Stanley Parish, but cadastral map No. 104 has the correct boundary, as confirmed by Drummond's inclusion in the list of grantees for the Campbell grant.) to the starting point.

== Communities ==
Communities at least partly within the parish. bold indicates an incorporated municipality or Indian reserve; italics indicate a name no longer in official use

- Bantalor
- Cross Creek Station
- **Devon 30**
- Durham Bridge
- **Fredericton**
  - Barkers Point
  - Marysville
  - Sandyville
- Glencoe
- Lower Durham
- Manzer
- Mount Hope
- Nashwaak
- Nashwaak Bridge
- Nashwaak Village
- Penniac
- Pleasant Valley
- Ross
- **St. Mary's 24**
- South Portage
- Taymouth
- Upper Durham
- Wellington
- Zionville

== Bodies of water ==
Bodies of water (Note: Not including brooks, ponds or coves.) at least partly within the parish.

- Cains River
- Nashwaak River
- Saint John River
- Tay River
- East Branch
- Campbell Creek
- Carman Creek
- Grieves Creek
- Kaine Creek
- Dunbar Stream
- Penniac Stream

== Islands ==
Islands at least partly within the parish.

- Penniac Island

== Other notable places ==
Parks, historic sites, and other noteworthy places at least partly within the parish.

- Bantalor Protected Natural Area
- Bantalor Wildlife Management Area
- Burpee Wildlife Management Area
- Cains River Protected Natural Area
- Dunbar Falls

== Demographics ==
Parish population total does not include Indian reserves and portion within Fredericton

=== Population ===
**Population trend**

Census	Population	Change (%)
2016	4,837	▲2.2%
2011	4,733	▲12.1%
2006	4,224	▲11.3%
2001	3,796	▲7.8%
1996	3,522	▲24.2%
1991	2,835	N/A

=== Language ===
**Mother tongue (2016)**

Language	Population	Pct (%)
English only	4,365	90.4%
French only	355	7.4%
Other languages	55	1.1%
Both English and French	55	1.1%

== See also ==
- List of parishes in New Brunswick
