= New Brunswick Route 628 =

Highway in New Brunswick, Canada

Coordinates: 46.111564°N 66.609421°W

Route 628

Route information
- Maintained by New Brunswick Department of Transportation
- Length: 21.9 km (13.6 mi)

Major junctions
- North end: Route 148 in Taymouth
- South end: Route 8 in Sandyville

Location
- Country: Canada
- Province: New Brunswick

Highway system
- Provincial highways in New Brunswick; Former routes
← Route 625	→ Route 630

Route 628 is a 21.9-kilometre (13.6 mi) long mostly north–south secondary highway in the eastern portion of New Brunswick, Canada.

The route starts at Route 148 in Taymouth where it travels south along the east bank of the Nashwaak River. The road passes through Durham Bridge, Nashwaak and Manzer. From here, the route travels through Penniac and past Penniac Island before it ends as it crosses the Nashwaak River on a bridge to Route 8.

== History ==
Prior to the opening of the Marysville Bypass in September 2014, this route started at Route 8 before the renumeration.
