= Stanley Parish, New Brunswick =

Stanley
- Parish
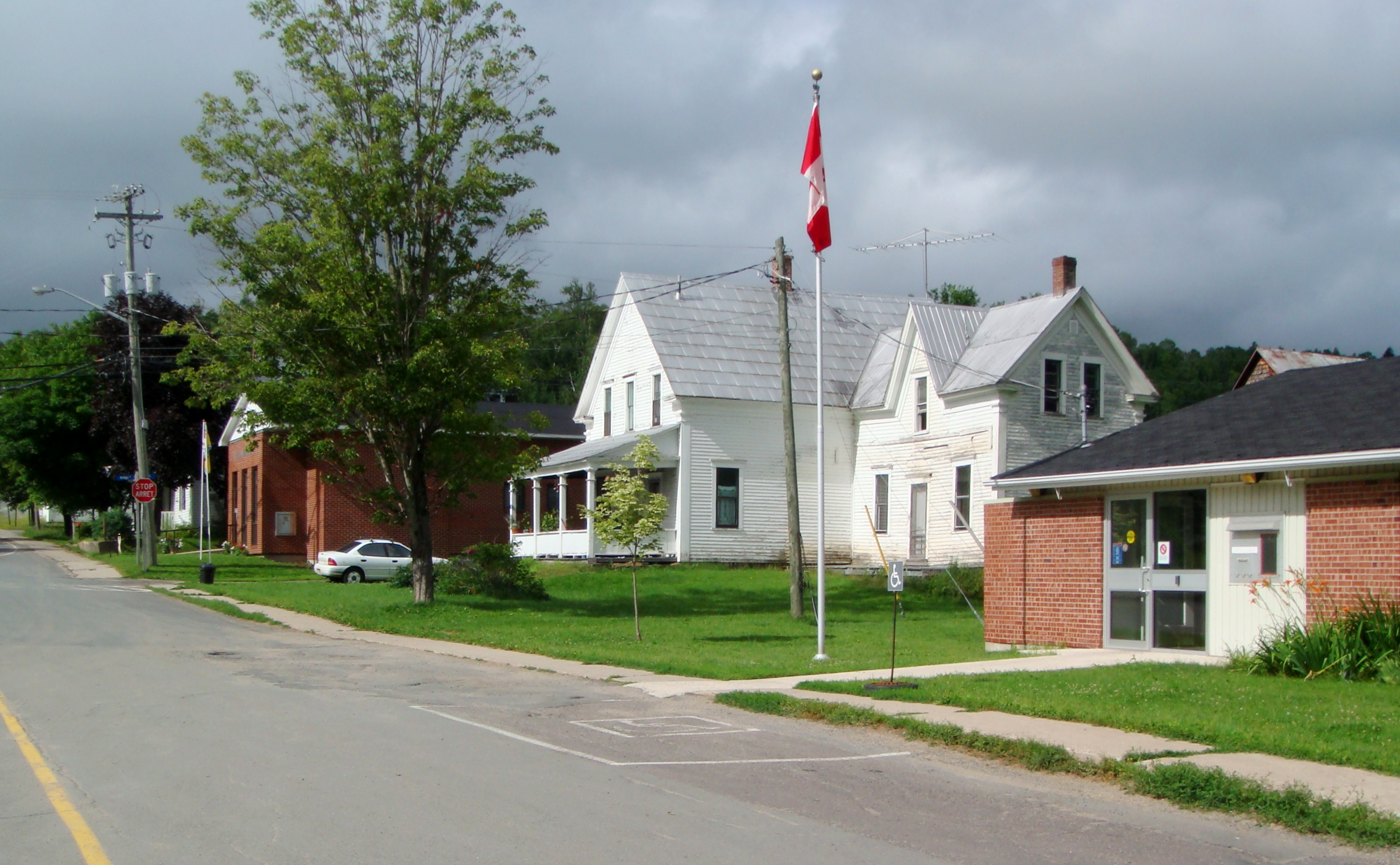
- Stanley village

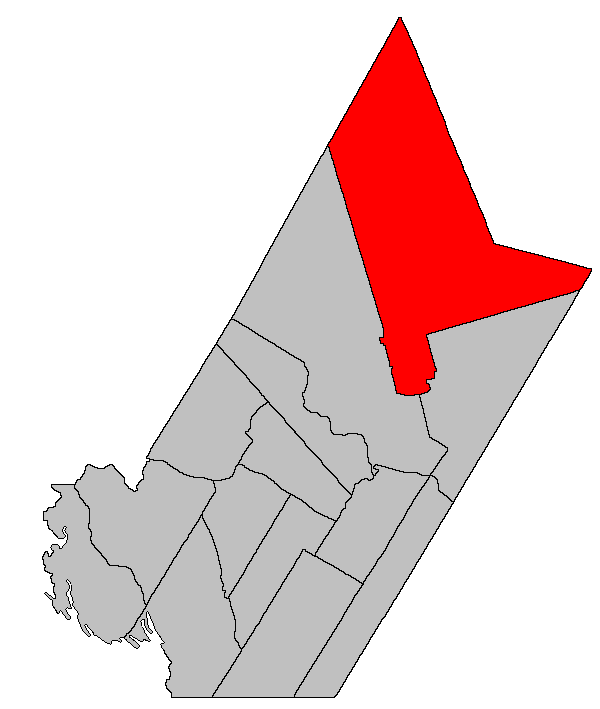
- Location within York County, New Brunswick.
- Coordinates: 46.4975°N 66.71°W
- Country: Canada
- Province: New Brunswick
- County: York
- Erected: 1837
- Dissolved: 1838
- Reërected: 1847

Area
  - Land: 1,218.38 km^{2} (470.42 sq mi)

Population (2021)
  - Total: 920
  - Density: 0.8/km^{2} (2.1/sq mi)
  - Change 2016-2021: ▲10.6%
  - Dwellings: 433
- Time zone: UTC-4 (AST)
  - Summer (DST): UTC-3 (ADT)
- Figures do not include portions within the village of Stanley and the rural community of Upper Miramichi

Stanley is a geographic parish in York County, New Brunswick, Canada.

Prior to the 2023 governance reform, for governance purposes it was divided between the village of Stanley, the incorporated rural community of Upper Miramichi, and the local service district of the parish of Stanley. Upper Miramichi was a member of the Greater Miramichi Regional Service Commission (GMRSC), the others of Capital Region Service Commission (RSC11).

== Origin of name ==
The parish takes its name from the settlement of Stanley, in turn named for Lord Stanley, Secretary of State for War and the Colonies at the time and an early supporter of the New Brunswick and Nova Scotia Land Company that promoted settlement of the area.

== History ==
The first iteration of Stanley was erected in 1837 from Douglas and Saint Marys Parishes.

In 1838 Stanley was dissolved.

In 1847 the modern Stanley was erected from Douglas and Saint Marys, expanding to include the northern part of the county.

== Boundaries ==
Stanley Parish is bounded:

- on the northeast by the Northumberland County line;
- on the southeast and south by a line beginning at the meeting of point of Sunbury, Northumberland, and York Counties, then running southwesterly about 5.25 kilometres along the Sunbury County line to the prolongation of the northern line of Loyalist grants along the Nashwaak River, then west-southwesterly along the prolongation and the Loyalist grants to a point about 650 metres north-northwesterly of Red Rock Branch Road and 900 metres west-southwesterly of Route 107, then southerly along the rear line the Loyalist grants on the western side of the Nashwaak, including a grant to Alexander Drummond along the English Settlement Road, (Note: Mapbook 328 erroneously includes the Drummond grant with Stanley Parish, but cadastral map No. 104 has the correct boundary, as confirmed by Drummond's inclusion in the list of grantees for the Campbell grant.) to the northern line of a grant to Samuel and John Casey, (Note: Both cadastral map No. 114 and mapbook 328 show the Casey grant being part of Saint Marys, although Casey wasn't part of either Loyalist group grant along the Nashwaak. The Casey grant was made in 1811, more than twenty years before Stanley Parish was first erected to encompass the lands of the New Brunswick and Nova Scotia Land Company.) then westerly about 1.6 kilometres and southerly about 1.4 kilometres to the South Branch Dunbar Stream, then westerly up the South Branch Dunbar to the eastern line of a grant to Thomas Richards fronting on the eastern side of Route 620;
- on the southwest and west by a line running along the rear line of grants fronting on the east side of Route 620 and Currieburg Road to the northeastern corner of a grant to Isaac Woodward Jouett, on the south side of Mick Road, then running north (Note: By the magnet of 1846, when declination in the area was slightly more than 18º west of north. The Territorial Division Act clause referring to magnetic direction bearings was omitted in the 1952 and 1973 Revised Statutes.) to the Carleton County line;
- on the northwest by the Carleton and Victoria County lines.

== Communities ==
Communities at least partly within the parish. bold indicates an incorporated municipality or incorporated rural community; italics indicate a name no longer in official use

- Centreville
- Cross Creek
- Cross Creek Station
- English Settlement
- Giants Glen (The Glen)
- Green Hill
- Limekiln
- Maple Grove
- Maple Grove Station
- Mavis Mills
- Red Rock
- South Portage
- **Stanley**
- Sutherland Siding
- Tay Falls
- Tay Valley
- Ward Settlement
- Williamsburg
- Woodlands
- **rural community of Upper Miramichi**
  - Astle
  - Bloomfield Ridge
  - Clearwater
  - Gordon Vale
  - Hayesville
  - McGivney
  - North Cains
  - Parker Ridge
  - Taxis River
  - Tugtown

== Bodies of water ==
Bodies of water (Note: Not including brooks, ponds or coves.) at least partly within the parish.

- Cains River
- Dungarvon River
- Little Dungarvon River
- Nashwaak River
- Southwest Miramichi River
- Taxis River
- Tay River
- Tuadook River
- Hinman Branch
- Dunbar Stream
- Cathle Creek
- Cross Creek
- more than thirty officially named lakes

== Islands ==
Islands at least partly within the parish.

- Clearwater Island
- Gaspereau Island
- Grassy Island
- Lower Birch Island
- Palmer Island
- Slate Island
- Strongbow Island
- Upper Birch Island
- Hayes Bar

== Other notable places ==
Parks, historic sites, and other noteworthy places at least partly within the parish.

- Bantalor Wildlife Management Area
- Clearwater Aerodrome
- Plaster Rock-Renous Wildlife Management Area
- Push and Be Damned Rapids
- Taxis Airstrip
- Tay River Protected Natural Area

== Demographics ==
Parish population total does not include village of Stanley and portion within Upper Miramichi

=== Population ===
**Population trend**

Census	Population	Change (%)
2016	832	▼7.9%
2011	903	▼7.0%
2006 after boundary change	971	N/A
2006	1,817	▼5.1%
2001	1,915	▼9.3%
1996	2,111	▲5.9%
1991	1,993	N/A

=== Language ===
**Mother tongue (2016)**

Language	Population	Pct (%)
English only	830	96.4%
French only	25	3.0%
Both English and French	0	0%
Other languages	5	0.6%

== See also ==
- List of parishes in New Brunswick
