= Shale gas in Canada =

Natural gas alternative in Canada

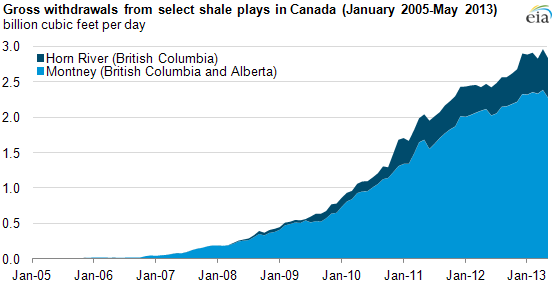
Growth of shale gas production in Canada

The inclusion of unconventional shale gas with conventional gas reserves has caused a sharp increase in estimated recoverable natural gas in Canada. Until the 1990s success of hydraulic fracturing in the Barnett Shales of north Texas, shale gas was classed as "unconventional reserves" and was considered too expensive to recover. There are a number of prospective shale gas deposits in various stages of exploration and exploitation across the country, from British Columbia to Nova Scotia.

The US Energy Information Administration estimated in 2013 that there were 573 trillion cubic feet (tcf) of technically recoverable natural gas in Canada.

== Resource law in Canada ==
Sir John A. Macdonald had already maintained in an 1880 parliamentary debate that the British North America Act 1867 vested the control of the inland and sea-coast fisheries of Canada in the Dominion government, who incurred all the expense incidental to their protection.

By virtue of the insertion in 1982 of section 92A of the British North America Act 1867, "(1) In each province, the legislature may exclusively make laws in relation to (a) exploration for non-renewable natural resources in the province;..." The geographical limits of the jurisdiction of the provinces had been tested by the Supreme Court of Canada in Reference Re: Offshore Mineral Rights, a 1967 case which involved all of the provinces that border on the ocean. The decision of the court was that the Dominion of Canada has authority over the sea and seabed; and this was later reflected by the insertion of section 92A.

== Southern Ontario ==
There are three major zones identified in Ontario:

- the Kettle Point Formation, known in Michigan as the Antrim Shale, where it is a source of shale gas.
- the Collingwood/Blue Mountain formations, known as Utica Shale
- the northernmost limit of the Marcellus Shale that extends up from Pennsylvania and New York State.

While Ontario in 2010 had 1,200 active oil wells and 1,400 active onshore and offshore natural gas wells, there was no major shale gas production as of early 2011.

In 2012, a campaign against fracking was launched in Ontario.

== Quebec ==
=== Utica Shale ===
The Ordovician Utica Shale in Quebec potentially holds 4×10^{12} cu ft (110×10^{9} m^{3}) at production rates of 1×10^{6} cu ft (28,000 m^{3}) per day From 2006 through 2009 24 wells, both vertical and horizontal, were drilled to test the Utica. Positive gas flow test results were reported, although none of the wells were producing at the end of 2009. Gastem, one of the Utica shale producers, has announced plans to explore for Utica Shale gas across the border in New York state.

The Utica shale is a black calcareous shale, from 150 to 700 feet (210 m) thick, with from 3.5% to 5% by weight total organic carbon. The Utica Shale play focuses on an area south of the St. Lawrence River between Montreal and Quebec City. Interest has grown in the region since Denver-based Forest Oil Corp. announced a significant discovery there after testing two vertical wells. Forest Oil said its Quebec assets may hold as much as four trillion cubic feet of gas reserves, and that the Utica shale has similar rock properties to the Barnett shale in Texas.

Forest Oil, which has several junior partners in the region, has drilled both vertical and horizontal wells. Calgary-based Talisman Energy has drilled five vertical Utica wells, and began drilling two horizontal Utica wells in late 2009 with its partner Questerre Energy, which holds under lease more than 1 million gross acres of land in the region. Other companies in the play are Quebec-based Gastem and Calgary-based Canbriam Energy.

The US Energy Information Administration estimated in 2013 that there were 31 trillion cubic feet (tcf) of technically recoverable natural gas in the Utica Shale in Quebec.

== British Columbia ==
On 26 August 2015, CBC reported that the British Columbia regulator was aware of a magnitude 4.4 earthquake which had been caused by Progress Energy, a subsidiary of the Malaysian state-owned enterprise, Petronas.

=== Muskwa Shale ===
The Devonian Muskwa Shale of the Horn River Basin in northeast British Columbia is said to contain 6×10^{12} cu ft (170×10^{9} m^{3}) of recoverable gas. Major leaseholders in the play are EOG Resources and Ovintiv

The government of British Columbia announced lease proceeds for 2008 to be in excess of CDN$2.2 billion, a record high for the province, with the majority of the proceeds coming from shale gas prospects. The British Columbia government has granted royalty credits to companies for drilling and infrastructure development in the area.

The US Energy Information Administration estimated in 2013 that there were 145 trillion cubic feet (tcf) of technically recoverable natural gas in the Muskwa Shale.

=== Montney Shale ===
The Montney Shale play is in east-central British Columbia. The Montney Formation has a sandy facies in Western Alberta, where oil is produced in the Sturgeon Lakes and Saddle Hills areas. Natural gas is extracted from siltstone reservoir in the Dawson Creek and Pouce Coupe areas and gas rich silty shales occur in the northern and western fringes of the deposit.

== Alberta ==
=== Duvernay Shale ===
The Duvernay Formation is considered the source rock for the Leduc reefs light oil play. Shale gas and condensate is produced from the Duvernay Formation in central Alberta using horizontal drilling and multi-stage hydraulic fracturing.

On 16 June 2015, Andrew Nikiforuk wrote that Chevron Canada had confirmed that "a magnitude 4.4 seismic event was recorded by seismic monitoring arrays operated by Chevron Canada and Natural Resources Canada" in the Duvernay shale near Fox Creek, Alberta. Nikiforuk is a journalist who has followed the Canadian oil and gas industry since the late 1990s.

== Nova Scotia ==
=== Horton Bluff Shale ===
In 2009, Triangle Petroleum Corporation completed two gas wells in the Horton Bluff Formation, of the Windsor Basin, Nova Scotia.

The US Energy Information Administration estimated in 2013 that there were 3.4 trillion cubic feet (tcf) of technically recoverable natural gas in the Horton Bluff Shale.

== New Brunswick ==
New Brunswick oil and gas exploration first began in 1859 in the Moncton sub-basin. The first efforts for commercial production in New Brunswick were in the Stoney Creek oil field, this begun in 1909. As of November 2011, nine companies had 71 different leases to search and explore for shale gas deposits across the province and not just in the southern part of New Brunswick. The province expected in 2011 to receive $21 million in royalties. Between 1990 and 2010, government statistics show 40 natural gas wells and 40 oil wells had been drilled. Another 49 wells had undergone hydraulic fracturing and nine of the wells had been drilled horizontally.

Companies operating in southern New Brunswick also have relatively close access to the Maritimes & Northeast Pipeline, which was built in 1999 to transport natural gas from Sable Island to New England.

Corridor Resources announced in 2010 that it had found more natural gas in place in southern New Brunswick than is available in all of western Canada's proven reserves, and that it had nearly overlooked the gas deposit because it had considered the well a dud at first and it was abandoned for the previous 11 years. Apache Canada was in 2010 one of the first companies that began drilling horizontal wells to tap the Frederick Brook shale deposit.

In June 2011 and in the wake of months of protests by citizens, Natural Resources minister Bruce Northrup unveiled new regulations on exploration that were to force producers to:

- perform baseline testing on all water wells within a minimum distance of 200 metres of seismic testing and 500 metres of oil or gas drilling before operations can begin;
- offer full disclosure of all fluids and chemicals used, or proposed, in the hydro-fracking process
- set up a security bond to protect property owners from potential accidents

Also in June 2011, Grand Chief Harry LaPorte of the Maliseet First Nation worried that the controversial mining process of hydro-fracking should not be allowed in New Brunswick over fears it could harm the water supply:

Hydro-fracking has a very, very good chance to leak into our water system. That's not only our drinking water but it's also our lakes, our rivers, our streams. And the chemicals that they put in, I'm told are very poisonous... My position is just to stop it all: stop it all. Do we need it? Do we need the shale gas? Does other parts of the world need the shale gas? But at what expense are we willing to go through to supply other people with what we have here?

In August 2011, SWN operations in New Brunswick were subject to vandalism, and in November, a teepee was erected by protestors, who were said to number 600, on the front lawn of the legislature in Fredericton. The Conservative New Brunswick government of David Alward at the time refused to put a moratorium on shale gas development in the province; Natural Resources minister Bruce Northrup seemed to be sympathetic to shale gas development in August, but seemed not to have clarified in his own mind the distinction between public and private property.

Also in August 2011, protesters at Stanley, New Brunswick, between Fredericton and Miramichi at the intersection of Route 107 and Route 620, blockaded seismic trucks. Protesters, who were concerned that the seismic testing could lead to hydro-fracking in their communities, came from various communities, such as Penniac, Taymouth, Stanley, Rogersville and several First Nations, and began singing traditional First Nations songs once the Royal Canadian Mounted Police (RCMP) arrived.

In November 2011, the New Brunswick Department of Natural Resources filed a complaint with the RCMP against Windsor Energy Inc. for allegedly violating the Oil and Natural Gas Act. The Calgary-based company was accused of directing a contracted company to conduct geophysical exploration within the boundaries of the town of Sussex, New Brunswick without the town's permission, according to a statement by Natural Resources Minister Bruce Northrup. Under regulation 86–191 of the Oil and Natural Gas Act, a municipality's written permission is required before geophysical activity can be conducted inside the boundaries of an incorporated municipality. Northrup has previously said it is clear Windsor Energy broke the rules and did so intentionally. Its contractor, Seismotion, originally asked for town approval to do tests within the community, and councillors arranged a special meeting in October, just ahead of the company's scheduled arrival, the department found, but when Seismotion crews arrived in Sussex two days ahead of schedule, the company decided not to wait for town consent.

Over the year 2012, SWN Resources increased its leasehold from 1 million hectares to 2.5 million hectares. It named new regions the Marysville Formation, the Cocagne Formation. It appeared that the lower third or quarter of the province had by then been claimed. The province measures in total 7.165 million hectares.

The Elsipogtog First Nation was subject to controversy when it protested with blockades the fracking activity of SWN Resources in 2013. This protest attracted international attention, and was one of the reasons why fracking was a major issue in the 2014 New Brunswick general election.

A week before the 2014 elections, Windsor Energy sued Northrup and the Government because of the statements Northrup made in 2011 to the effect that Windsor violated the province's Oil and Natural Gas Act when it conducted seismic testing in the town of Sussex. Windsor claimed Northrup was libellous when he issued a press release in November of that year, following an incident in which a Windsor subcontractor did seismic tests along Highway 1 inside Sussex town limits. Northrup said Windsor did not have permission to do the tests and had violated the act. The province then filed a complaint with the RCMP. In the statement of claim, Windsor recounts how it was cleared by the RCMP and alleges Northrup's press release was false, misleading and defamatory, and that the negative publicity drove potential investors away from his company. It was not immediately apparent how an apology issued by the company in 2011 to the mayor, councillors and people of Sussex would affect the suit.

On 24 March 2015, the Gallant government appointed a three-member panel to study the hydraulic fracturing process and report back to cabinet within one year on whether the government's conditions for shale gas development can be met. Energy and Mines Minister Donald Arseneault said that the government has a responsibility to consider the controversial method of natural gas extraction as a possible way to create jobs. Gallant appointed Guy Richard, former chief justice of the Court of Queen's Bench, to lead the commission. Richard is the father-in-law of Dominic LeBlanc, a federal MP and Gallant's campaign manager in the 2014 provincial election. The conditions of the government were reported to be:

- if New Brunswickers at large approve,
- if there is clear and credible information about the impacts of fracking,
- if there's a plan to mitigate the impacts on public infrastructure and deal with waste water,
- if there is a process to consult with First Nations,
- and if there is a way to maximize the local benefits, such as royalties.

On 29 May 2015, Richard stepped down as head of the commission, and was replaced by Marc Leger, a career civil servant and former clerk of New Brunswick's Executive Council. The other two members are John McLaughlin and Cheryl Robertson.

=== Frederick Brook Shale ===
New Brunswick has an estimated 80 trillion cubic feet of gas locked more than a kilometre beneath the ground in the Frederick Brook Shale formation in the southern part of the province. This formation, which was created more than 300 million years ago, runs along the south shore of New Brunswick from the Hampton area all the way to Sackville.

In June 2010, Apache Canada began drilling a horizontal well to tap the Lower Carboniferous Frederick Brook Shale, near Sussex, New Brunswick. Apache is in a joint venture with Halifax-based Corridor Resources Inc., which has extensive leasehold in the province. Corridor has drilled two vertical wells that tested gas from the Frederick Brook.

In 2013, Corridor Resources proposed a phased Environmental Impact Assessment (EIA) for the expansion of the McCully Field in 2013 and 2014. Phase 1 was to expand the F-67 well pad by October 2013 and phase 2 began exploration and development by November 2014.

In 2015, it was revealed that Contact Exploration Inc., had plans to do oil and gas exploration in Salem, near Hillsborough, New Brunswick in the marshlands of the Petitcodiac River. The proposed Phased EIA was under review by the Government of New Brunswick.
