= Nashwaak =

Nashwaak or Nashwaaksis may refer to:

- Nashwaak, New Brunswick, a rural community in Canada
- Nashwaak River, a tributary of the Saint John River

== See also ==
- Nashwaaksis, New Brunswick, a neighbourhood and former village in the city of Fredericton
- Fredericton-Nashwaaksis, a provincial electoral district for the Legislative Assembly of New Brunswick, Canada
- Nashwauk, Minnesota, a city in Itasca County
