= Douglas Parish, New Brunswick =

Douglas
- Parish
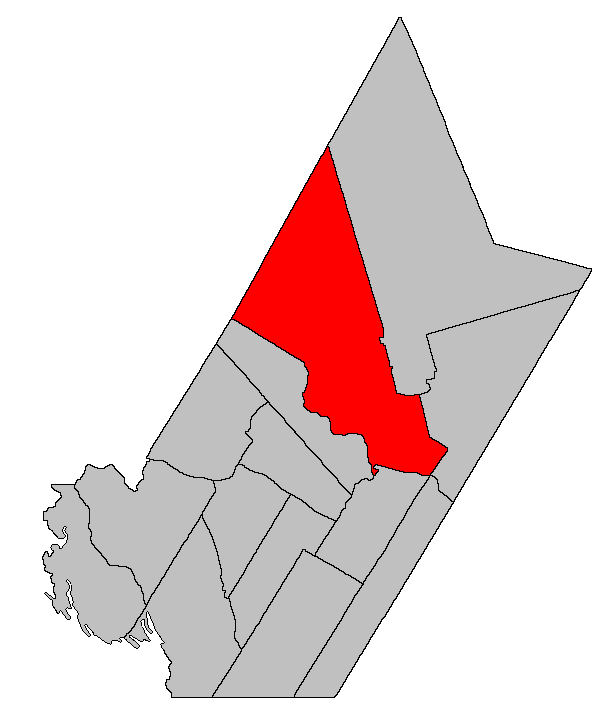
- Location within York County, New Brunswick.
- Coordinates: 45.98°N 66.7325°W
- Country: Canada
- Province: New Brunswick
- County: York
- Erected: 1824

Area
  - Land: 1,443.31 km^{2} (557.27 sq mi)

Population (2021)
  - Total: 5,935
  - Density: 4.1/km^{2} (11/sq mi)
  - Change 2016-2021: ▲4.1%
  - Dwellings: 2,357
- Time zone: UTC-4 (AST)
  - Summer (DST): UTC-3 (ADT)
- Population change reflects change in boundaries after 2016. Figures do not include portion within the city of Fredericton

Douglas is a geographic parish in York County, New Brunswick, Canada.

Prior to the 2023 governance reform, for governance purposes it was divided between the city of Fredericton and the local service districts of Estey's Bridge and the parish of Douglas, all of which were members of Capital Region Service Commission (RSC11). Douglas Parish includes the special service areas of Carlisle Road and Lower Douglas.

== Origin of name ==
The parish was named in honour of Sir Howard Douglas, Lieutenant Governor of New Brunswick at the time.

== History ==
Douglas was erected in 1824 from Queensbury and Saint Marys Parish; the new parish included parts of modern Bright and Stanley Parishes and extended north only as far as the Nashwaak River. The boundary with Queensbury was adjusted in 1835, moving up the Saint John and running along a different angle in the interior. William Francis Ganong's map of 1836 parish boundaries shows a much smaller parish than today.

In 1837–38 the interior north of the Keswick River and South Branch Dunbar Stream was included in the original Stanley Parish, dissolved a year after it was erected. This put settlements along the modern Route 620 in Stanley.

In 1842 the parish was extended west to Southampton Parish, adding part of Queensbury to Douglas but also affecting unassigned lands. The northern boundary was unmentioned, implicitly extended upstream along the Nashwaak River.

In 1845 the first of a half-dozen boundary changes among the islands in the Saint John River took place. While most of these changes took place in the nineteenth century, it was 1973 before the modern boundary was finalised.

In 1847 the holdings of the New Brunswick and Nova Scotia Land Company and unassigned lands to the north were erected as a new Stanley Parish, establishing the southern part of the modern boundary with Douglas. In 1850 the unassigned area to the north of the Nashwaak River and west of Stanley was added to Douglas, (Note: The same consolidation added the remaining unassigned parts of the province to existing parishes, mainly in York County.) an area sparsely inhabited even today.

In 1869 part of Douglas along the length of its southwestern boundary was erected as Bright Parish.

In 1952 a narrow strip of land along the eastern border was removed when the Revised Statutes updated the Territorial Division Act's boundary for Fredericton; the earlier annexation of Devon by Fredericton did not affect the parish lines in the TDA. The 1973 enlargement of Fredericton created the same situation, with the city's municipal boundaries extending into Douglas Parish but not the boundaries listed in the TDA.

== Boundaries ==
Douglas Parish is bounded:

- on the northeast and east by a line beginning on the Carleton County line at a point about 7 kilometres east of McKiel Lake, then running south (Note: By the magnet of 1846, when declination in the area was slightly more than 18º west of north. The Territorial Division Act clause referring to magnetic direction bearings was omitted in the 1952 and 1973 Revised Statutes.) to the northeastern corner of a grant to Isaac Woodward Jouett, which is on the southern side of the Mick Road, then generally southerly following the eastern line of grants along the Currieburg Road and Route 620 to the South Branch Dunbar Stream, then downstream about 1.85 kilometres to meet the western line of Saint Marys Parish, then south (Note: By the magnet of 1850, when declination in the area was between 18º and 19º west of north.) about 10 kilometres to the eastern line of a grant to Daniel Sawyer, about 2.3 kilometres west of Route 148, then southeast about 5 kilometres, partly along the southwestern line of the Devon 30 Indian reserve, to meet the prolongation of Douglas Avenue, then along the prolongation and Douglas Avenue itself to the Saint John River; (Note: The Territorial Division Act uses the pre-1973 boundaries of Fredericton; the modern municipal boundaries extended further west.)
- on the south by the Saint John River;
- on the west and southwest by a line running up the Keswick River to the mouth of Howard Brook, then running north 40º west (Note: By the magnet of 1869, when declination in the area was between 19º and 20º west of north.) to the Carleton County line;
- on the northwest by the Carleton County line;
- including Keswick, Mitchells, Upper Shores, and Lower Shores Islands and part of Sugar Island roughly north and west of the Baseline Road.

== Communities ==
Communities at least partly within the parish. bold indicates an incorporated municipality; italics indicate a name no longer in official use

- Barton
- Birdton
- Boyds Corner
- Burtts Corner
- Cardigan
- Currieburg
- Deersdale
- Dorn Ridge
- Esteys Bridge
- Fredericksburg
- **Fredericton**
  - Douglas
  - Nashwaaksis
- Half Moon Pit
- Hamtown Corner
- Hurlett
- Jones Forks
- Keswick
- Killarney Road
- Kingsley
- Lower Stoneridge
- MacLean Settlement
- McLeod Hill
- Morehouse Corner
- Mouth of Keswick
- Napadogan
- North Tay
- Pughs Crossing
- Royal Road
- Royal Road West
- Tay Creek
- Tay Mills
- Upper Stoneridge
- Woodlands
- Zealand

== Bodies of water ==
Bodies of water (Note: Not including brooks, ponds or coves.) at least partly within the parish.

- Keswick River
- Nashwaak River
  - The Narrows
- North Tay River
- Saint John River
- South Tay River
- Southwest Miramichi River
- Taxis River
- South Branch Becaguimec Stream
- South Branch Dunbar Stream
- Little Nashwaaksis Stream
- Nashwaaksis Stream
- Regiment Creek
- Weaver Creek
- more than thirty officially names lakes

== Islands ==
Islands at least partly within the parish.

- Birch Island
- Keswick Island
- Lower Shores Island
- Mitchells Island
- Upper Shores Island

== Other notable places ==
Parks, historic sites, and other noteworthy places at least partly within the parish.

- McBean Brook Protected Natural Area
- Nashwaak River Protected Natural Area
- Push and Be Damned Rapids
- Sills Brook Protected Natural Area

== Demographics ==
Parish population total does not include portion within Fredericton

=== Population ===
**Population trend**

Census	Population	Change (%)
2016	6,154	▲1.2%
2011	6,081	▲5.3%
2006	5,774	▲1.0%
2001	5,719	▲0.9%
1996	5,666	▲8.2%
1991	5,237	N/A

=== Language ===
**Mother tongue (2016)**

Language	Population	Pct (%)
English only	5,645	91.9%
French only	335	5.5%
Other languages	125	2.0%
Both English and French	35	0.6%

== See also ==
- List of parishes in New Brunswick
