= List of historic places in York County, New Brunswick =

This article is a list of historic places in York County, New Brunswick entered on the Canadian Register of Historic Places, whether they are federal, provincial, or municipal.

== List of historic places ==
Name	Address	Coordinates	Government recognition (CRHP №)	Wikidata ID	Image
565 Aberdeen Street	565 Aberdeen Street; Fredericton NB	45°57′21″N 66°38′39″W	Fredericton municipality (17262)		Upload Photo
Allen House	868 George Street; Fredericton NB	45°57′20″N 66°38′08″W	Fredericton municipality (2997)		More images
Arts Building	3 Bailey Drive; Fredericton NB	45°56′54″N 66°38′29″W	Federal (7369)		More images
Auld Kirk	433 Charlotte Street; Fredericton NB	45°57′32″N 66°38′45″W	Fredericton municipality (17201)		Upload Photo
441 Balsa Street	441 Balsa Street; Fredericton NB	45°58′15″N 66°38′11″W	Fredericton municipality (17203)		Upload Photo
Beaverbrook Art Gallery	703 Queen Street; Fredericton NB	45°57′36″N 66°38′08″W	Fredericton municipality (16982)		More images
Lady Beaverbrook Rink	411 University Avenue; Fredericton NB	45°57′03″N 66°38′19″W	Fredericton municipality (16983)		More images
42 Bridge Street	42 Bridge Street; Fredericton NB	45°58′44″N 66°35′10″W	Fredericton municipality (18442)		Upload Photo
185 Canada Street	185 Canada Street; Fredericton NB	45°58′22″N 66°35′27″W	Fredericton municipality (18443)		Upload Photo
189 Canada Street	189 Canada Street; Fredericton NB	45°58′24″N 66°35′28″W	Fredericton municipality (18434)		Upload Photo
299 Canada Street	299 Canada Street; Fredericton NB	45°58′54″N 66°35′34″W	Fredericton municipality (12835)		Upload Photo
329 Canada Street	329 Canada Street; Fredericton NB	45°59′03″N 66°35′33″W	Fredericton municipality (18436)		Upload Photo
335-337 Canada Street	335-337 Canada Street; Fredericton NB	45°59′06″N 66°35′33″W	Fredericton municipality (17022)		Upload Photo
Canadian Pacific Railway Station	380 York Street; Fredericton NB	45°57′24″N 66°38′55″W	Federal (4520)		Upload Photo
All Saints Anglican Church	150 Crock's Point Road; Bright Parish NB	45°58′00″N 66°50′51″W	Bright Parish municipality (2212)		Upload Photo
Caretaker's Cottage	303 Odell Avenue; Fredericton NB	45°57′44″N 66°39′21″W	Fredericton municipality (13126)		Upload Photo
120 Carleton Street	120 Carleton Street; Fredericton NB	45°57′38″N 66°38′30″W	Fredericton municipality (4097)		Upload Photo
Bliss Carman House	83 Shore Street; Fredericton NB	45°57′12″N 66°38′00″W	Fredericton municipality (13035)		More images
Carriage House Inn	230 University Avenue; Fredericton NB	45°57′20″N 66°38′02″W	Fredericton municipality (2881)		More images
Charlotte Street School	732 Charlotte Street; Fredericton NB	45°57′21″N 66°38′21″W	New Brunswick (11440), Fredericton municipality (12994)		More images
650 Charlotte Street	650 Charlotte Street; Fredericton NB	45°57′24″N 66°38′28″W	Fredericton municipality (12265)		More images
818 Charlotte Street	818 Charlotte Street; Fredericton NB	45°57′18″N 66°38′14″W	Fredericton municipality (17204)		More images
871 Charlotte Street	871 Charlotte Street; Fredericton NB	45°57′18″N 66°38′09″W	Fredericton municipality (16842)		More images
Christ Church Cathedral National Historic Site of Canada	100 Brunswick Street; Fredericton NB	45°57′50″N 66°39′05″W	Federal (11974)		
The Church of St. Mary the Virgin	373 New Maryland Highway; New Maryland NB	45°53′27″N 66°41′03″W	New Brunswick (2877)		More images
CPR Company House - Klondike	49 Rockland Drive; McAdam NB	45°35′38″N 67°19′42″W	McAdam municipality (12288)		Upload Photo
CPR Company House - 30 Lake Avenue	30 Lake Avenue; McAdam NB	45°35′43″N 67°19′48″W	McAdam municipality (12286)		Upload Photo
CPR Company House - 101 Saunders Road	101 Saunders Road; McAdam NB	45°35′29″N 67°19′45″W	McAdam municipality (10577)		Upload Photo
Crocket House	796 Queen Street; Fredericton NB	45°57′31″N 66°38′06″W	Fredericton municipality (4069)		More images
Diggity Site	Diggity Cove; McAdam NB	45°37′40″N 67°26′00″W	New Brunswick (7989)		Upload Photo
6 Downing Street	6 Downing Street; Fredericton NB	45°58′46″N 66°35′07″W	Fredericton municipality (18439)		Upload Photo
8 Downing Street	8 Downing Street; Fredericton NB	45°58′47″N 66°35′07″W	Fredericton municipality (18440)		Upload Photo
14 Downing Street	14 Downing Street; Fredericton NB	45°58′49″N 66°35′07″W	Fredericton municipality (18441)		Upload Photo
Engine 29 and Firetruck Display Building	146 Saunders Road; McAdam NB	45°35′47″N 67°19′57″W	McAdam municipality (12289)		Upload Photo
First McAdam Railway Station	11 Granite Street; McAdam NB	45°35′37″N 67°19′56″W	McAdam municipality (10554)		Upload Photo
Forest Hill Cemetery	325 Forest Hill Road; Fredericton NB	45°56′20″N 66°38′12″W	Fredericton municipality (12996)		More images
Former Gibson Roundhouse	912-930 Union Street; Fredericton NB	45°57′30″N 66°37′27″W	Fredericton municipality (13132)		Upload Photo
Former Marysville Hotel	7 Bridge Street; Fredericton NB	45°58′44″N 66°35′20″W	Fredericton municipality (18433)		More images
Former New Brunswick Electric Power Commission Building	527 King Street; Fredericton NB	45°57′39″N 66°38′27″W	Fredericton municipality (17001)		Upload Photo
Fort Nashwaak (Naxoat) National Historic Site of Canada	Carleton Park; Fredericton NB	45°57′42″N 66°37′31″W	Federal (13272)		
Fredericton City Hall National Historic Site of Canada	397 Queen Street; Fredericton NB	45°57′49″N 66°38′35″W	Federal (12722), Fredericton municipality (12837)		More images
Fredericton Water Treatment Plant	101 Smythe Street; Fredericton NB	45°57′55″N 66°39′04″W	Fredericton municipality (12962)		Upload Photo
Frogmore	35 Colter Court; Fredericton NB	45°57′11″N 66°38′53″W	Fredericton municipality (2879)		Upload Photo
522 George Street	522 George Street; Fredericton NB	45°57′32″N 66°38′34″W	Fredericton municipality (13120)		Upload Photo
770 George Street	770 George Street; Fredericton NB	45°57′23″N 66°38′15″W	Fredericton municipality (17184)		More images
806 George Street	806 George Street; Fredericton NB	45°57′22″N 66°38′11″W	Fredericton municipality (13034)		More images
844 George Street	844 George Street; Fredericton NB	45°57′21″N 66°38′09″W	Fredericton municipality (12266)		More images
Gibson Family Plot	351 Canada Street; Fredericton NB	45°59′14″N 66°35′41″W	Fredericton municipality (18437)		Upload Photo
Gill House	968 Riverside Drive; Fredericton NB	45°55′48″N 66°36′04″W	Fredericton municipality (13000)		Upload Photo
Glacier Rock	Saunders Road; McAdam NB	45°35′23″N 67°19′48″W	McAdam municipality (10558)		Upload Photo
Government of Canada Building	633 Queen Street; Fredericton NB	45°57′40″N 66°38′18″W	Federal (11053)		Upload Photo
Mary Evelyn Grannan House	325 Brunswick Street; Fredericton NB	45°57′43″N 66°38′47″W	New Brunswick (2361)		Upload Photo
21 Grey Street	21 Grey Street; Fredericton NB	45°57′03″N 66°38′14″W	Fredericton municipality (12281)		More images
Hartt Boot and Shoe Factory	401 York Street; Fredericton NB	45°57′22″N 66°38′58″W	Fredericton municipality (2850)		Upload Photo
Hatt House	293 Canada Street; Fredericton NB	45°58′52″N 66°35′34″W	Fredericton municipality (18435)		Upload Photo
42nd Highland Memorial Cemetery	Route 8 Saint Marys Parish NB	46°12′44″N 66°36′48″W	New Brunswick (7441)		More images
Holy Trinity Anglican Church	Highway 105; Lower Saint Marys NB	45°55′21″N 66°35′16″W	New Brunswick (2713)		Upload Photo
Howe Family Property	730-750 Howe Street; Fredericton NB	45°59′12″N 66°37′26″W	Fredericton municipality (17183)		Upload Photo
William Brydone Jack Observatory	3 Bailey Drive; Fredericton NB	45°33′54″N 66°22′59″W	Federal (9981)		More images
Kilburn House	155 Smythe Street; Fredericton NB	45°57′50″N 66°39′08″W	Fredericton municipality (12263)		Upload Photo
260 Kings College Road	260 Kings College Road; Fredericton NB	45°57′06″N 66°39′25″W	Fredericton municipality (16367)		Upload Photo
Kings Landing Historical Settlement	20 Kings Landing Road (Route 2); Prince William NB	45°52′00″N 66°57′15″W	New Brunswick (6301)		More images
Legislative Assembly Block	706 Queen Street; Fredericton NB	45°57′33″N 66°38′10″W	New Brunswick (1268)		More images
Marysville Cenotaph	190 Canada Street; Fredericton NB	45°58′42″N 66°35′33″W	Fredericton municipality (18444)		More images
Marysville Cotton Mill National Historic Site of Canada	8 River Street; Fredericton NB	45°58′43″N 66°35′18″W	Federal (12664)		More images
Marysville Historic District National Historic Site of Canada	centered on Mill and Canada Streets; Fredericton NB	45°58′43″N 66°35′32″W	Federal (7672)		
McAdam Heritage Park	Saunders Road; McAdam NB	45°35′24″N 67°19′47″W	McAdam municipality (10573)		Upload Photo
McAdam Post Office	105 Saunders Road; McAdam NB	45°35′30″N 67°19′43″W	McAdam municipality (10542)		Upload Photo
McAdam Railway Station (Canadian Pacific) National Historic Site of Canada	146 Saunders Road; McAdam NB	45°35′54″N 67°19′37″W	Federal (3207, (6523), New Brunswick (6476), McAdam municipality (10553)		More images
Meductic Indian Village / Fort Meductic National Historic Site of Canada	Fort Meductic Road; Lakeland Ridges NB	46°01′32″N 67°32′23″W	Federal (14831)		More images
Military Compound	Queen Street; Fredericton NB	45°57′45″N 66°38′29″W	Federal (18989), New Brunswick (7750)		
Morrison Building	514-516 Queen Street; Fredericton NB	45°57′42″N 66°38′27″W	Fredericton municipality (12244)		Upload Photo
Morrison House	765 Charlotte Street; Fredericton NB	45°57′21″N 66°38′18″W	Fredericton municipality (12264)		Upload Photo
Mud Lake Stream Anthropological Site	North Lake Parish NB	45°40′58″N 67°42′59″W	New Brunswick (7991)		Upload Photo
Neill House	255 Church Street; Fredericton NB	45°57′19″N 66°38′16″W	Fredericton municipality (17243)		More images
178 Northumberland Street	178 Northumberland Street; Fredericton NB	45°57′45″N 66°38′58″W	Fredericton municipality (17241)		Upload Photo
216 Odell Avenue	216 Odell Avenue; Fredericton NB	45°57′48″N 66°39′15″W	Fredericton municipality (12983)		Upload Photo
226 Odell Avenue	226 Odell Avenue; Fredericton NB	45°57′48″N 66°39′15″W	Fredericton municipality (12993)		Upload Photo
234-236 Odell Avenue	234-236 Odell Avenue; Fredericton NB	45°57′47″N 66°39′16″W	Fredericton municipality (13117)		Upload Photo
Old Burial Ground	500 Brunswick Street; Fredericton NB	45°57′36″N 66°38′34″W	Fredericton municipality (12919)		Upload Photo
Old Fire Hall	441 King Street; Fredericton NB	45°57′42″N 66°38′36″W	Fredericton municipality (16822)		Upload Photo
Old Government House	20 Woodstock Road; Fredericton NB	45°57′56″N 66°39′21″W	Federal (7642), New Brunswick (10620)		More images
Palmer-McLellan Building	364 Argyle Street; Fredericton NB	45°57′23″N 66°38′59″W	Fredericton municipality (4068)		Upload Photo
Phoenix Square	397 Queen Street; Fredericton NB	45°57′48″N 66°38′36″W	Fredericton municipality (17202)		Upload Photo
Queen's Square	730 Aberdeen Street; Fredericton NB	45°57′12″N 66°38′27″W	Fredericton municipality (13138)		More images
279 Regent Street	279 Regent Street; Fredericton NB	45°57′25″N 66°38′33″W	Fredericton municipality (17261)		Upload Photo
351 Regent Street	351 Regent Street; Fredericton NB	45°57′21″N 66°38′37″W	Fredericton municipality (16802)		Upload Photo
Royals Field	60 Morrison Street; Fredericton NB	45°58′57″N 66°35′15″W	Fredericton municipality (18438)		Upload Photo
St. Anne's Chapel of Ease	201 Westmorland Street; Fredericton NB	45°57′40″N 66°38′53″W	Federal (4443)		More images
St. George's Anglican Church	53 Rockland Drive; McAdam NB	45°35′39″N 67°19′43″W	McAdam municipality (10589)		Upload Photo
Saint John River	Fredericton NB	45°58′02″N 66°38′23″W	Fredericton municipality (18451)		More images
261 St. John Street	261 St. John Street; Fredericton NB	45°57′22″N 66°38′24″W	Fredericton municipality (12838)		More images
St. John the Evangelist Church	74 Main Street; Fredericton NB	45°58′54″N 66°39′40″W	Fredericton municipality (13124)		Upload Photo
St. Mary's Departmental Store	69 Cliffe Street; Fredericton NB	45°58′11″N 66°38′05″W	Fredericton municipality (17021)		Upload Photo
St. Paul's United Church	155 Saunders Road; McAdam NB	45°35′41″N 67°19′38″W	McAdam municipality (10587)		Upload Photo
St. Paul's United Church National Historic Site of Canada	500 George Street; Fredericton NB	45°57′35″N 66°38′39″W	Federal (11934)		Upload Photo
St. Peter's Anglican Church	2365 Woodstock Road; Fredericton NB	45°58′00″N 66°44′25″W	Fredericton municipality (17041)		Upload Photo
332 Saunders Street	332 Saunders Street; Fredericton NB	45°57′32″N 66°38′56″W	Fredericton municipality (18449)		Upload Photo
344 Saunders Street	344 Saunders Street; Fredericton NB	45°57′32″N 66°38′55″W	Fredericton municipality (18450)		Upload Photo
Shrine to Saint Francis of Assisi	413 Upper Skiff Lake Road; Canterbury Parish NB	45°51′26″N 67°31′30″W	New Brunswick (9703)		Upload Photo
Site of the Union Church and Burial Ground	Stannix Street; McAdam NB	45°35′49″N 67°19′27″W	McAdam municipality (10563)		Upload Photo
Smyth House	248 Smythe Street; Fredericton NB	45°57′31″N 66°38′09″W	Fredericton municipality (4447)		Upload Photo
248 Smythe Street	248 Smythe Street; Fredericton NB	45°57′44″N 66°39′10″W	Fredericton municipality (13118)		Upload Photo
Thorne Cottage	266 Golf Club Road; Fredericton NB	45°57′33″N 66°41′02″W	Fredericton municipality (12836)		Upload Photo
402 Union Street	402 Union Street; Fredericton NB	45°58′19″N 66°38′13″W	Fredericton municipality (17023)		Upload Photo
880 Union Street	880 Union Street; Fredericton NB	45°57′33″N 66°37′29″W	Fredericton municipality (18432)		Upload Photo
311 University Avenue	311 University Avenue; Fredericton NB	45°57′12″N 66°38′10″W	Fredericton municipality (13593)		More images
Victoriana Rose	193 Church Street; Fredericton NB	45°57′24″N 66°38′12″W	Fredericton municipality (17185)		More images
Welsh Chapel	Route 620; Douglas NB	46°09′30″N 66°47′19″W	New Brunswick (6668)		Upload Photo
24 Waterloo Row	24 Waterloo Row; Fredericton NB	45°57′21″N 66°38′00″W	Fredericton municipality (13114)		More images
50 Waterloo Row	50 Waterloo Row; Fredericton NB	45°57′17″N 66°37′59″W	Fredericton municipality (16821)		More images
92 Waterloo Row	92 Waterloo Row; Fredericton NB	45°57′13″N 66°37′58″W	Fredericton municipality (12959)		More images
327 Westmorland Street	327 Westmorland Street; Fredericton NB	45°57′32″N 66°39′00″W	Fredericton municipality (18445)		Upload Photo
338 Westmorland Street	338 Westmorland Street; Fredericton NB	45°57′31″N 66°39′00″W	Fredericton municipality (18446)		Upload Photo
348 Westmorland Street	348 Westmorland Street; Fredericton NB	45°57′30″N 66°39′00″W	Fredericton municipality (18448)		Upload Photo
Wilmot Park	20 Woodstock Road; Fredericton NB	45°57′49″N 66°39′25″W	Fredericton municipality (13134)		More images
Wilmot United Church	473 King Street; Fredericton NB	45°57′41″N 66°38′30″W	New Brunswick (6229)		More images
Wolastoq National Historic Site of Canada	Entire watershed of Saint John River central and western New Brunswick, parts of southeastern Quebec NB	45°58′01″N 66°40′11″W	Federal (18954)		More images
World War II Bomber Crash Site Monument	92 Saunders Road; McAdam NB	45°35′24″N 67°19′46″W	McAdam municipality (10560)		Upload Photo
York County Court House National Historic Site	649 Queen Street; Fredericton NB	45°57′37″N 66°38′12″W	Federal (4482)		
York County Gaol	668 Brunswick Street; Fredericton NB	45°57′30″N 66°38′21″W	New Brunswick (6282)		More images
York County Municipal Home Cemetery	115 Jewett Street; Fredericton NB	45°58′47″N 66°41′12″W	Fredericton municipality (13125)		Upload Photo
York Street School	193 York Street; Fredericton NB	45°57′38″N 66°38′43″W	Fredericton municipality (17242)		More images
York Street Train Station	380-390 York Street; Fredericton NB	45°57′22″N 66°38′52″W	Fredericton municipality (18121)		Upload Photo

== See also ==
- List of historic places in New Brunswick
- List of National Historic Sites of Canada in New Brunswick
