= Stanley, New Brunswick =

Stanley
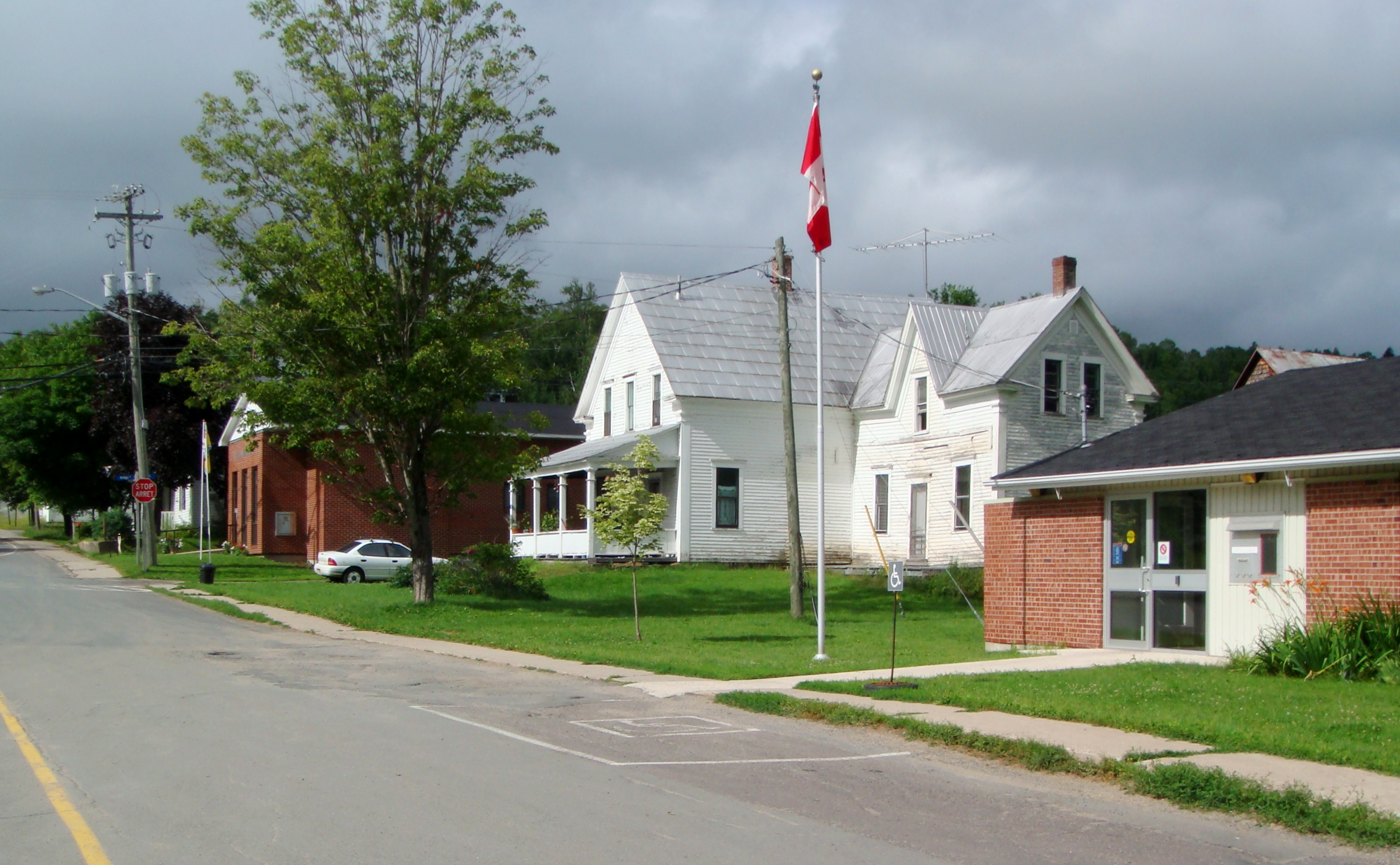
- View of Stanley

- Location of Stanley in New Brunswick
- Coordinates: 46°27′7.9″N 66°59′2.9″W
- Country: Canada
- Province: New Brunswick
- County: York County
- Parish: Stanley Parish
- Municipality: Nashwaak
- Named for: Hon. Frederick Stanley

Area
  - Land: 16.93 km^{2} (6.54 sq mi)

Population (2021)
  - Total: 397
  - Density: 23.5/km^{2} (61/sq mi)
  - Change (2016–21): ▼1.6%
- Time zone: UTC-4 (Atlantic)
  - Summer (DST): UTC-3 (Atlantic)
- Area code: Area code 506
- Total dwellings: 182
- Website: www.thevillageofstanley.ca

Stanley is a former village in York County, in the Canadian province of New Brunswick; it was an incorporated village until the end of 2022 and is now part of the rural community of Nashwaak.

== History ==
Stanley straddles the Nashwaak River 30 km north of Fredericton at the intersection of Route 107 and Route 620. The area was colonized in 1833 when a group associated with the New Brunswick and Nova Scotia Land Company became interested in the area. Early impressions of the land were not positive, with surveyors noting the rocky soil as one problem. The general remoteness of the location was also a problem.

Initial immigrants to Stanley arrived in three waves. The first was young children and teens from London. The second was farmers and tradesmen from the Eastern Borders of Scotland and England. The third arrived from the Isle of Skye.

In 1846, 798 square miles (2,070 km^{2}) were established as the Parish of Stanley. By 1951, there were 130 residences, and 149 stores and barns.

The village is home to the annual Stanley Fair, the longest continuously running agricultural fair in Canada. The first edition of the fair was held in October 1851, although it is now held in the summer.

The first sawmill was constructed at the bottom of Stanley hill in 1856, by the New Brunswick and Nova Scotia Land Company.

There were schools in Tay Creek, North Tay, Fredericksburg, Currieburg, Limekiln, Red Rock, English Settlement, Tay Falls, Tay Valley, Giants Glen, Ward Settlement, Cross Creek, Green Hill, Maple Grove, Williamsburg, and Napadogan.

After decades of economic decline the area may be set for a boom. The Trans-Canada Pipeline, natural gas exploration and a tungsten and molybdenum mine near Stanley. However there are concerns about the environmental impact these projects may have on the environment, including the Nashwaak River.

On 1 January 2023, Stanley amalgamated with parts of four local service districts to form the new incorporated rural community of Nashwaak. The community's name remains in official use.

== Demographics ==
Historical populations: Stanley, NB
Year	Pop.	±%
2001	460	—
2006	433	−5.9%
2011	419	−3.2%
2016	412	−1.7%
2021	397	−3.6%

In the 2021 Census of Population conducted by Statistics Canada, Stanley had a population of 397 living in 164 of its 182 total private dwellings, a change of −3.6% from its 2016 population of 412. With a land area of 16.93 km^{2} (6.54 sq mi), it had a population density of 23.4/km^{2} (60.7/sq mi) in 2021.

== Notable people ==
- Matthew Wuest: Sports reporter and founder of CapGeek

== See also ==
- List of communities in New Brunswick
