= New Brunswick Route 8 =

Highway in New Brunswick

Route 8
- Route 8 highlighted in red.

Route information
- Maintained by New Brunswick Department of Transportation
- Length: 260.4 km (161.8 mi)
- Existed: 1920s–present

Major junctions
- South end: Route 2 (TCH) near Fredericton
- Route 7 in Fredericton; Route 10 in Fredericton; Route 11 in Miramichi
- North end: Route 11 in Bathurst

Location
- Country: Canada
- Province: New Brunswick
- Counties: York, Northumberland, Gloucester
- Major cities: Fredericton, Miramichi, Bathurst

Highway system
- Provincial highways in New Brunswick; Former routes
← Route 7	→ Route 10

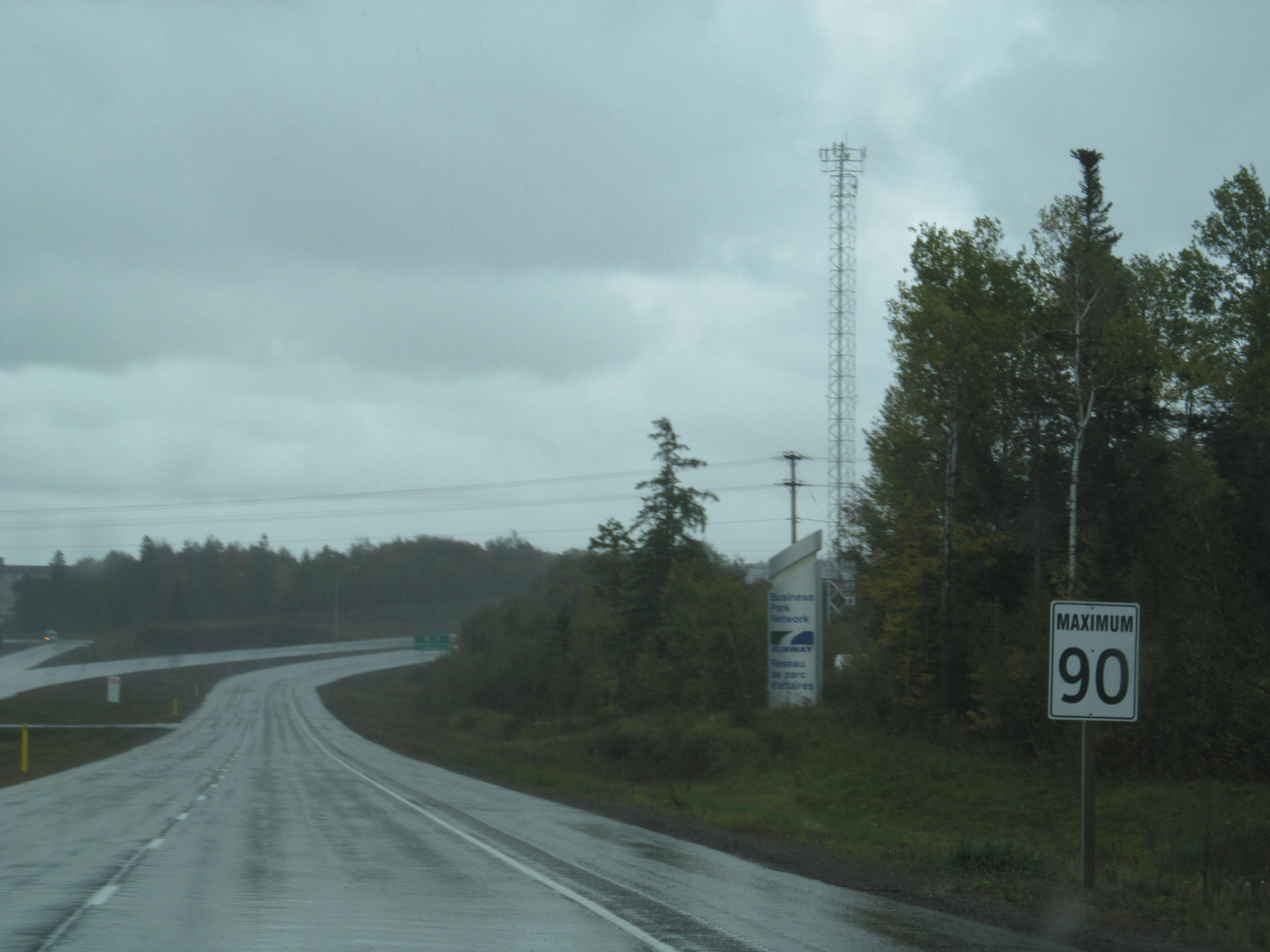
Route 8 in Fredericton

New Brunswick Route 8 is a major highway in the province of New Brunswick, Canada. It is 261 kilometres (162 mi) long and connects Fredericton to the south with Miramichi and Bathurst to the north.

== Route description ==
Route 8 begins at Trans-Canada Highway 2 in Fredericton. It uses the old alignment of the TCH between there and Route 7 before heading north on the Princess Margaret Bridge.

After a roundabout with Route 105, Route 8 becomes a two-lane limited access highway. First named the Barkers Point Bypass, it becomes the Marysville Bypass following the intersection with Route 10.

After the Marysville Bypass, Route 8 generally follows the Southwest Miramichi River up until Miramichi, where it has an overlap with Route 11 on the Centennial Bridge before heading north on its own as a two-lane expressway, later ending at Route 11 in Bathurst.

== History ==
Route 8 was one of the original New Brunswick routes in the 1920s. Its route saw little changes until bypasses were constructed in the Fredericton area in the 1980s and 1990s. It would also see an extension south on part of the old Trans-Canada Highway 2 bypass of Fredericton in 2001.

In 2006, Route 8 was realigned on a two-lane bypass of part of Newcastle in Miramichi.

On January 12, 2008, a van carrying the basketball team from Bathurst High School collided with a semi-trailer truck on Route 8 near Bathurst, killing eight and injuring four. This prompted the government of New Brunswick to ban the use of 15-passenger vans for student transport.

=== Marysville Bypass ===
A bypass for the Fredericton suburbs of Marysville and South Portage, north of Taymouth, was started in 2007 before officially opening August 26, 2014. The estimated cost of the bypass was CA$124 million. The old alignment of Route 8 became Route 148 upon completion of the bypass.

== Major intersections ==
From south to north:

County	Location	km	mi	Exit	Destinations	Notes
York		0.0	0.0		Route 2 (TCH) – Edmundston, Moncton, Saint John	Exit 280 on Route 2; eastbound exit, westbound entrance
York		0.0	0.0	South end of Fredericton Bypass		
York	Fredericton	3.6	2.2	3	Route 640 (Hanwell Road) to Route 102	
York	Fredericton	5.4	3.4	(5)	Smythe Street, Bishop Drive	Roundabout
York	Fredericton	5.9– 6.9	3.7– 4.3	6	Route 101 (Regent Street) – New Maryland	Signed as exits 6A (south) and 6B (north)
York	Fredericton	5.9– 6.9	3.7– 4.3	7	Route 7 south to Route 2 (TCH) east – Fredericton Airport, Oromocto, Saint John, Moncton	
York	Fredericton	8.7	5.4	9	Forest Hill Road	
York	Fredericton	8.9– 10.0	5.5– 6.2	Princess Margaret Bridge crosses the Saint John River		
York	Fredericton	10.1	6.3	10	Route 105 south (Riverside Drive) – Jemseg	South end of Route 105 concurrency
York	Fredericton	10.1	6.3	North end of Fredericton Bypass		
York	Fredericton	10.7	6.6		Route 105 north (Riverside Drive)	North end of Route 105 concurrency
York	Fredericton	10.7	6.6	South end of Barkers Point Bypass		
York	Fredericton	12.5	7.8	(13)	Route 10 east (Greenwood Drive) – Minto	
York	Fredericton	12.5	7.8	North end of Barkers Point Bypass • South end of Marysville Bypass		
York	Fredericton	16.0	9.9	(17)	To Route 148 west / Bridge Street	
York	Penniac	23.7	14.7	23	Route 628 north (Penniac Road)	
York	Durham Bridge	33.5	20.8	33	To Route 628 / Route 148 / Lower Durham Road – Durham Bridge	
York	Nashwaak Bridge	46.7	29.0	(47)	Route 107 west – Nashwaak Bridge, Nashwaak	
York		50.8	31.6	(52)	Route 148 south – Nashwaak Bridge	
York		50.8	31.6	North end of Marysville Bypass		
Northumberland	Boiestown	75.8	47.1		Route 625 west – Parker Ridge	
Northumberland	Doaktown	101.8	63.3		Route 123 south – Chipman, Minto	
Northumberland	Doaktown	102.6	63.8	Crosses the Southwest Miramichi River		
Northumberland	Renous-Quarryville	146.4	91.0	139	Route 108 – Renous, Tobique Valley	
Northumberland	Renous-Quarryville	151.1	93.9		Route 415 – Red Rock, Quarryville	
Northumberland	Miramichi	170.3	105.8	163	Route 108 south / Route 420 west – Red Bank, Millerton	
Northumberland	Miramichi	170.6– 171.1	106.0– 106.3	Crosses the Northwest Miramichi River		
Northumberland	Miramichi	171.8	106.8	164	Route 425 west / Curtis Road – Sunny Corner	
Northumberland	Miramichi	175.4	109.0		Route 430 north – Wayerton	Roundabout; south end of Route 430 concurrency
Northumberland	Miramichi	177.5– 178.1	110.3– 110.7	170	King George Highway	North end of Route 430 concurrency; south end of Route 117 concurrency
Northumberland	Miramichi	178.5– 179.1	110.9– 111.3	Miramichi Bridge crosses the Miramichi River		
Northumberland	Miramichi	179.7	111.7		Route 126 south (Nelson Street) / Water Street – Nouvelle-Arcadie	Roundabout
Northumberland	Miramichi	187.6	116.6	119	Route 11 south – Moncton; Route 117 north (University Avenue)	North end of Route 117 concurrency; south end of Route 11 concurrency
Northumberland	Miramichi	189.0	117.4	120	Church Street	
Northumberland	Miramichi	189.1– 190.1	117.5– 118.1	Centennial Bridge crosses the Miramichi River		
Northumberland	Miramichi	190.2	118.2	179	King George Highway (Route 11 north) – Tracadie-Sheila	North end of Route 11 concurrency
Northumberland	Miramichi	192.5	119.6	180	McKinnon Road	
Northumberland		216.5	134.5		Route 450 east – Lavillette, Neguac	
Gloucester		228.8	142.2		Route 134 north – Allardville	
Gloucester	Allardville	244.1	151.7	231	Route 160 east / Route 360 west to Route 134 – Allardville, Hautes-Terres, Brunswick Mines	
Gloucester	Bathurst	260.4	161.8		Route 11 to Miramichi Avenue (Route 134) – Campbellton, Caraquet	Exit 301 on Route 11
1.000 mi = 1.609 km; 1.000 km = 0.621 mi: Concurrency terminus; Incomplete access

== See also ==
- List of New Brunswick provincial highways
