= New Brunswick Route 105 =

Highway in New Brunswick

Route 105

Route information
- Maintained by New Brunswick Department of Transportation
- Length: 307 km (191 mi)
- Existed: 1965–present

Major junctions
- South end: Route 10 in Youngs Cove
- Route 2 (TCH) in Jemseg; Route 8 in Fredericton; Route 104 in Mouth of Keswick; Route 2 (TCH) in Hartland; Route 2 (TCH) in Florenceville; Route 107 in Bristol; Route 109 in Perth-Andover
- North end: Route 108 in Grand Falls

Location
- Country: Canada
- Province: New Brunswick
- Major cities: Fredericton, Nackawic-Millville, Hartland, Florenceville, Bristol, Perth-Andover

Highway system
- Provincial highways in New Brunswick; Former routes
← Route 104	→ Route 106

Route 105 is a collector highway in New Brunswick running from Route 10 in Youngs Cove to Route 108 in Grand Falls, mostly along the east and north banks of the Saint John River, over a distance of 307.0 kilometres (190.8 mi). Route 105 consists largely of former alignments of Route 2 (the Trans-Canada Highway) and runs parallel to Route 2 over its entire length.

Since late 2016, a gap has existed on Route 105 since the closure and removal of the old Jemseg River Bridge connecting Jemseg and Coytown. Traffic must use the nearby Route 2 freeway and the newer Jemseg River Bridge to bypass the affected section of Route 105.

== Route description ==
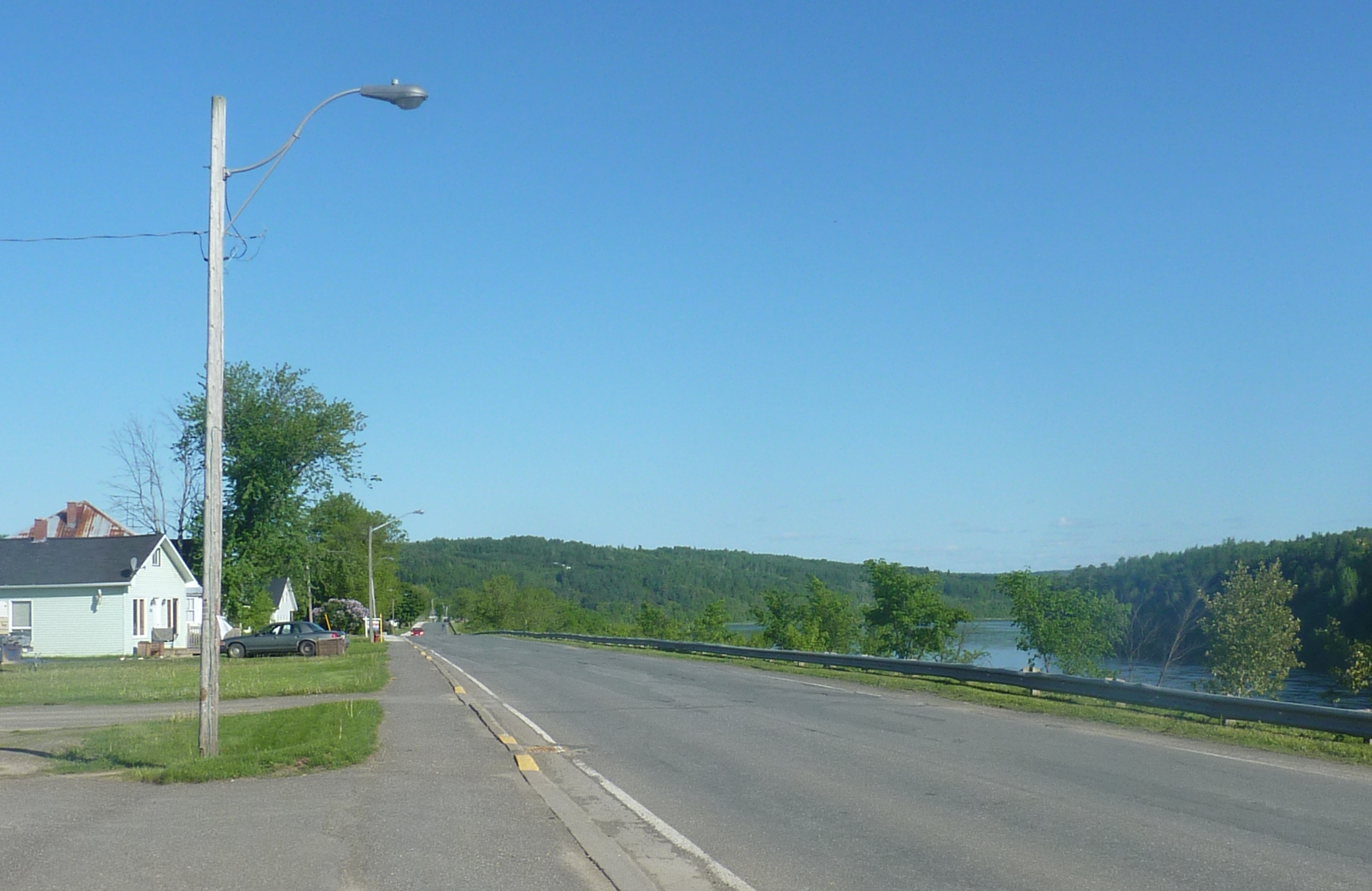
Route 105 at Bath

From Youngs Cove, Route 105 follows a former routing of the Trans-Canada Highway southwest (signed north) along the south shore of Grand Lake to Jemseg.

The Route 105 designation ends at the intersection with Route 695 in Jemseg due to the decommissioning of the old Jemseg River Bridge. The existing roadway, Marina Drive, terminates at a cul-de-sac just before reaching the river. The same is true approaching the river from the west. Traffic must use the Trans-Canada Highway (Route 2) between exits 333 and 339 to cross the Jemseg River.

The Route 105 designation resumes upon exiting Route 2 at exit 333 near Coytown. From there, the route continues west, following the east bank of the Saint John River, to Fredericton. Within Fredericton, the highway is known as Riverside Drive in the district of Barkers Point and Union Street in Devon. The Nashwaaksis area is bypassed by a four-lane divided expressway known as Ring Road, which connects to the Westmorland Street Bridge.

West of Fredericton, Route 105 continues along the east bank of the river, through Douglas and Keswick Ridge, crossing the Mactaquac Headpond. Between Mactaquac and Nackawic-Millville, the road was rerouted after construction of the dam and passes through areas such as Bear Island. The road changes direction to a north-south orientation as the river changes course between Nackawic-Millville and Woodstock. The Grafton Bridge, near the junction with Route 585, provides access to the town of Woodstock. Continuing north along the river's east bank, Route 105 passes through Hartland, Florenceville, Bristol, Bath and Perth-Andover. Crossing the Tobique River using the Tobique Narrows Dam, Route 105 passes through several more small farming communities and terminates at Route 108 in Grand Falls.

== History ==
Route 105 was first numbered in 1965, on a section between Fredericton and Hartland that was formerly known as Route 21. When the Trans-Canada Highway bridge at Florenceville was completed in 1968, Route 2 was rerouted to the other side of the Saint John River and Route 105 was extended north to Perth-Andover. It was further extended north to Grand Falls in 1984, when it replaced Route 125.

With the Trans-Canada Highway project between Fredericton and Moncton completed in 2001, Route 105 was extended eastward from Fredericton as well, taking over the former Route 2 between Fredericton and the Route 10 junction at Youngs Cove.

On May 22, 2015, the Jemseg River Bridge carrying Route 105 over the Jemseg River was closed following an inspection which revealed significant deterioration on the underside of its structure. The bridge was barricaded and traffic was detoured onto Route 2 between exits 333 and 339. There appear to be no plans to replace the bridge, which would cost an estimated $3 million. The end spans of the bridge were removed in late 2016 and cul-de-sacs were constructed at the bridge approaches. Additionally, Route 105 signage was removed from the affected sections of the highway, leaving a 5.7-kilometre (3.5 mi) gap in the highway.

== Major intersections ==
County	Location	km	mi	Destinations	Notes
Queens	Youngs Cove	0.0	0.0	Route 10 – Chipman, Sussex	
Queens	Mill Cove	13.0	8.1	To Route 2 (TCH) (Mill Cove Road) – Fredericton, Moncton	
Queens	Jemseg	25.8	16.0	Route 695 south (Grand Lake Drive) to Route 2 (TCH) / Route 715 – Fredericton	Northern terminus of Route 695
Queens	Jemseg - Canning Parish	25.8– 31.5	16.0– 19.6	#1 Jemseg River Bridge - Route 105 designation ends at Route 695 and resumes at Route 2 (TCH) exit 333	
Queens	Canning Parish	31.5– 32.9	19.6– 20.4	Route 2 (TCH) east – Moncton	Exit 333 on Route 2, no westbound entrance
Sunbury	Sheffield	43.7	27.2	Route 690 east – Grand Lake	Western terminus of Route 690
Sunbury	Burton	56.9	35.4	To Route 102 / Route 7 (Burton Bridge) – Oromocto, Arcadia	Interchange
York	Barkers Point	73.0	45.4	Route 8 south (Fredericton Bypass, Princess Margaret Bridge) to Route 2 (TCH) / Route 7 – Edmundston, Moncton	Interchange; southern end of concurrency with Route 8; Route 7 and Edmundston/Moncton only appear on southbound signage
York	Barkers Point	73.1	45.4	Route 8 north (Barkers Point Bypass) to Route 10 – Miramichi, Minto	Northern end of concurrency with Route 8; Route 10 and Minto only appear on northbound signage
York	Fredericton	76.8	47.7	Route 148 north to Route 8 – Miramichi (SB signage); To Route 105 north (NB signage)	Southern terminus of Route 148
York	Fredericton	78.4	48.7	Route 148 (Saint Mary's Street) to Route 8 – Miramichi	Interchange, northbound exit and entrance
York	Fredericton	81.0	50.3	Route 620 north (Royal Road) / Main Street – Nashwaak	Interchange, southern terminus of Route 620
York	Keswick	94.3	58.6	Route 104 north – Burtts Corner, Nackawic-Millville	Southern terminus of Route 104
York	McKeens Corner	98.3	61.1	Route 616 north / Crocks Point Road	Southern terminus of Route 616
York	McKeens Corner	100.4	62.4	To Route 102 / Route 2 (TCH) west (Mactaquac Road) – Edmundston	
York	Mactaquac	103.5	64.3	Route 615 north – Scotch Lake, Scotch Settlement	Southern terminus of Route 615
York	Upper Queensbury	139.9	86.9	Route 610 east	Western terminus of Route 610
York	Nackawic-Millville	143.7	89.3	Route 605 north – Nackawic-Millville	Southern terminus of Route 605
York	Southampton	148.8	92.5	To Route 2 (TCH) (Hawkshaw Bridge Road)	No southbound signage
Carleton	Woodstock	189.2	117.6	Route 585 – Woodstock, Nackawic-Millville	
Carleton	Hartland	205.8	127.9	Route 575 east (Cloverdale Road) – Cloverdale	Western terminus of Route 575
Carleton	Hartland	207.3	128.8	To Route 103 (Hartland Hill Bridge Road)	
Carleton	Hartland	208.6	129.6	Route 130 to Route 2 (TCH) – Florenceville-Bristol, Fredericton, Edmundston	Interchange
Carleton	Florenceville-Bristol	226.0	140.4	Route 130 to Route 2 (TCH) – Perth-Andover, Hartland	Interchange
Carleton	Florenceville-Bristol	230.1	143.0	Route 107 east (Juniper Road) – Juniper	Western terminus of Route 107
Carleton	Bath	235.7	146.5	Route 565 north (Mechanic Road) – Johnville	Southern terminus of Route 565
Carleton	Upper Kent	246.0	152.9	Route 565 south – Holmesville	Northern terminus of Route 565
Victoria	Perth-Andover	266.0	165.3	Route 109 west	Southern end of concurrency with Route 109
Victoria	Perth-Andover	266.5	165.6	Route 109 east (Gulch Road) – Tobique Valley	Northern end of concurrency with Route 109; no access from Route 109 west to Route 105 north or from Route 105 south to Route 109 east
Victoria	Tilley	273.8	170.1	Route 390 east – Tobique Valley	Western terminus of Route 390
Victoria	New Denmark	291.5	181.1	Route 380 east – New Denmark, Lake Edward	Western terminus of Route 380
Victoria	Grand Falls	307.0	190.8	Route 108 (Chemin Tobique) – Grand Falls, Tobique Valley	
1.000 mi = 1.609 km; 1.000 km = 0.621 mi: Closed/former; Concurrency terminus; Incomplete access

== See also ==
- Provincial archives of New Brunswick recorded circa July 7, 1971. F3919 - NB Rte 105 - 1971 PANB | APNB
