= Westmorland Street Bridge =

Bridge in Canada

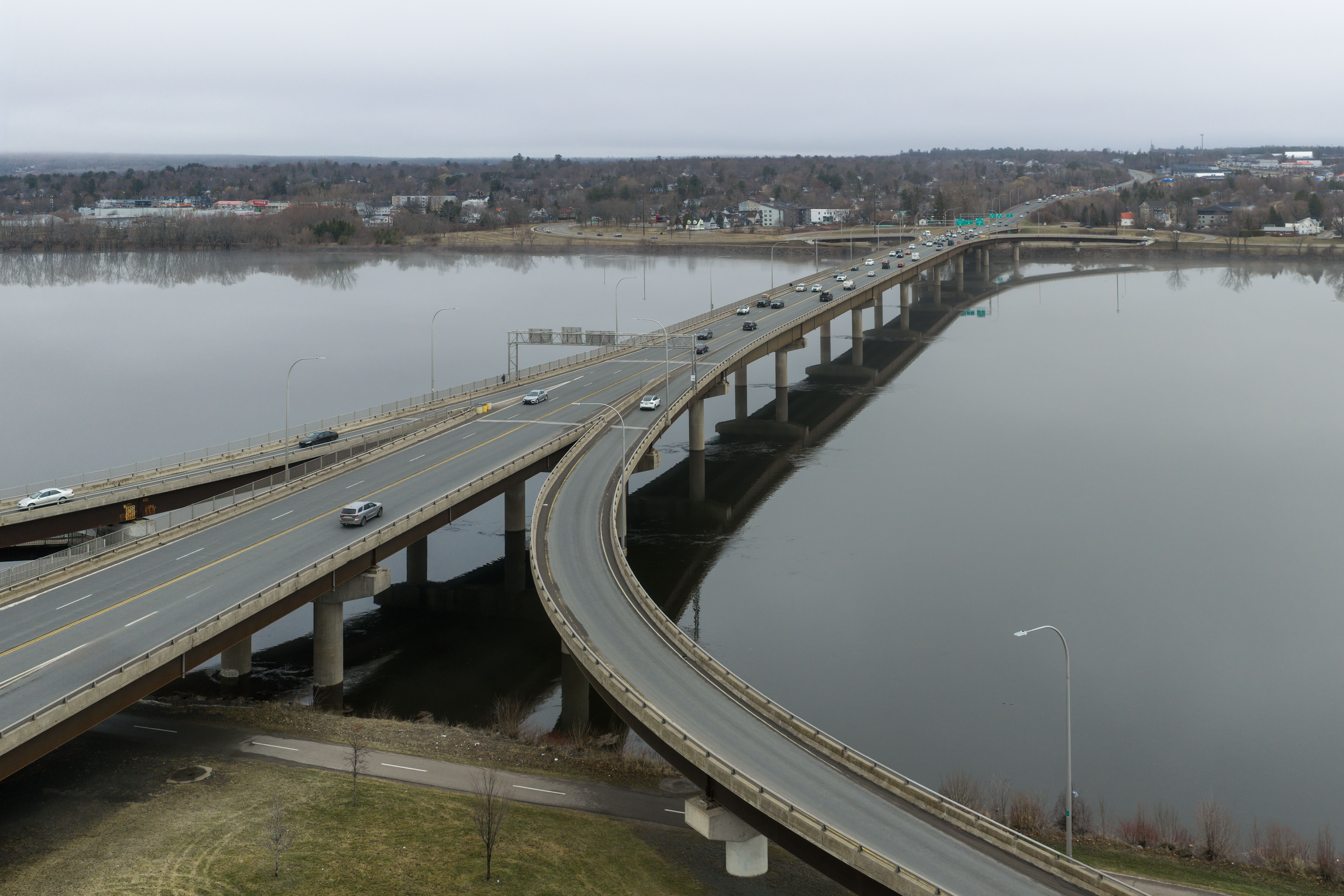
- The bridge in 2026, as viewed from the south
- Coordinates: 45.968692°N 66.642637°W
- Carries: Westmorland Street
- Locale: Fredericton, New Brunswick, Canada

History
- Opened: 1981

Location
- Interactive map of Westmorland Street Bridge

The Westmorland Street Bridge is a bridge crossing the Saint John River in Fredericton, New Brunswick, Canada. Opened on September 19, 1981, the Westmorland Street Bridge is an extension of Westmorland Street in Fredericton's central business district and connects with Route 105 (or the Ring Road) in Nashwaaksis, a neighbourhood of Fredericton since municipal amalgamation in the 1970s.

== Structure ==
The bridge is a continuous steel girder structure with concrete sidewalls measuring 750 metres (2,460 ft) long and carrying four traffic lanes with a posted speed limit of 70 km/h (43.5 mph). There is a pedestrian/bicycle pathway on the north side of the vehicle lanes.

== Access roads ==
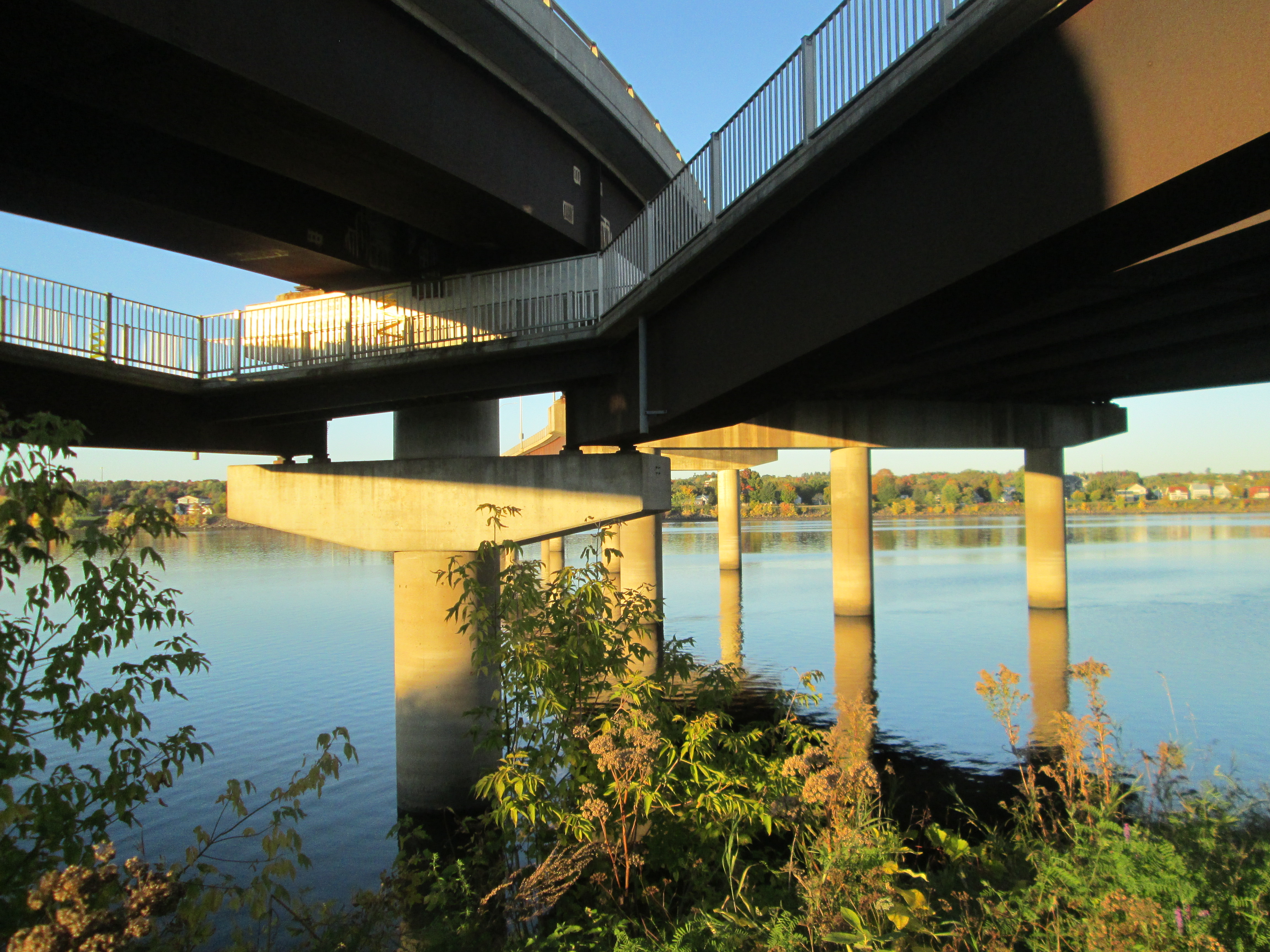
Pedestrian links under the Westmorland Street Bridge

Due to the propensity of spring freshets on the Saint John River, a large part of the floodplain is preserved as open space free from development on both sides of the bridge; part of this open space is taken up by the bridge approach roads - the south side of the easterly-flowing river hosts Pointe-Sainte-Anne Boulevard (occasionally called Riverfront Drive), whereas the north side hosts Devonshire Drive. Pointe-Sainte-Anne was the historic Acadian name for Fredericton as this "point" in the river was the location of a former village opposite Fort Nashwaak, hence the French name for the street passing over this territory.

These roads were constructed at the same time as the Westmorland Street Bridge and are accessed via modified cloverleaf interchanges. The final element of the Westmorland Street Bridge was completed on 5 September 2008 when the northeast exit ramp from the bridge for eastbound traffic on Devonshire Drive was opened. This ramp was part of the original design for the bridge but was not built in the 1970s as a result of budget cuts. The idea of completing the missing ramp was periodically resurrected by municipal politicians over a period of 25 years until construction finally began in 2007. Until that time, a temporary connection was used to connect the eastbound lanes of Union Street (which parallels Devonshire Drive).

== History ==
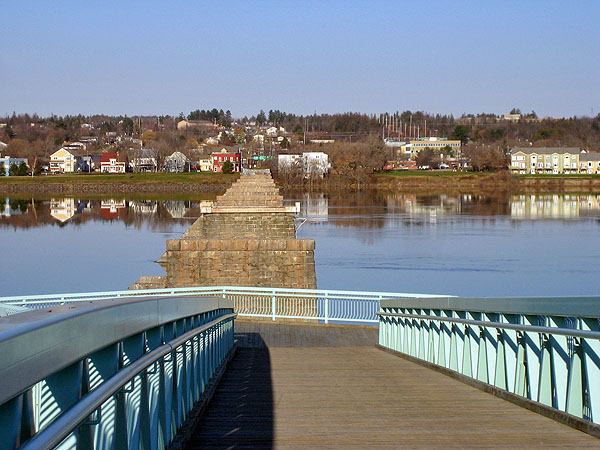
Remains of the Carleton Street Bridge

Considerable public debate preceded construction of the Westmorland Street Bridge in both municipal and provincial politics. Prior to late 1950s, Fredericton had a single bridge crossing the Saint John River. The Carleton Street Bridge was constructed in 1905 as an extension of Carleton Street on the south side to Bridge Street (now Cliffe Street) on the east bank (or north side). Later, in 1959, the Princess Margaret Bridge was opened as part of the construction of the Route 2 (the Trans-Canada Highway) bypass project around the city.

In 1968, construction of the Mactaquac Dam 15 kilometres upriver from Fredericton closed the river to navigable traffic above the city. That same year saw residents and government officials begin to discuss a replacement for the Carleton Street Bridge, now that the costly navigation requirement was eliminated. By the early 1970s, the provincial government (the project's primary proponent) settled on an ambitious traffic planning scheme which would see a single new low profile bridge constructed from the foot of Westmorland Street with appropriate collector roads along the waterfront floodplain.

This plan elicited various protests by residents and the so-called Citizens' Bridge Committee was founded in May 1974 to urge the provincial government to find an alternative location for the proposed bridge. Issues cited included the location, size and cost of the crossing. The Westmorland Street location was controversial as it and the collector roads would have a major impact on the city's historic riverfront. The Fredericton chapter of the New Brunswick Conservation Council and the Fredericton Heritage Trust were among several organizations which also sought changes to the proposed bridge location and design.

The specific objectives of the Citizens' Bridge Committee included: citizen participation in the decisions relating to bridge and highway construction, to develop public awareness of the problem, to coordinate public input, and to articulate community concerns. The committee sought expert opinions on bridge and highway matters, made news releases, provided speakers to groups and information to the general public, and represented public concerns before governments and government agencies.

The committee dissolved in September 1975, having decided its members had presented their views to the public and the project had been given a lower priority by the government of Premier Richard Hatfield. In January 1977 a new committee was formed, called Save Our City, in response to renewed efforts by the provincial government to proceed with a replacement for the Carleton Bridge. This committee included representatives from the York-Sunbury Historical Society, the New Brunswick Conservation Council, the University Women's Club, Fredericton Heritage Trust, the Community Planning Association of Canada, various neighbourhood associations, and some members from the Citizen's Bridge Committee. The aim of this new committee was to "open the eyes and ears of civil servants and politicians who have persisted in ignoring the substantial opposition to the Westmorland Street bridge proposal."

Construction of the Westmorland Street Bridge began in the late 1970s and required both swing spans on the Fredericton Railway Bridge and the Carleton Street Bridge be opened for tugboats and barges needed during the project. This would be the last time the railway bridge swing span was ever opened.

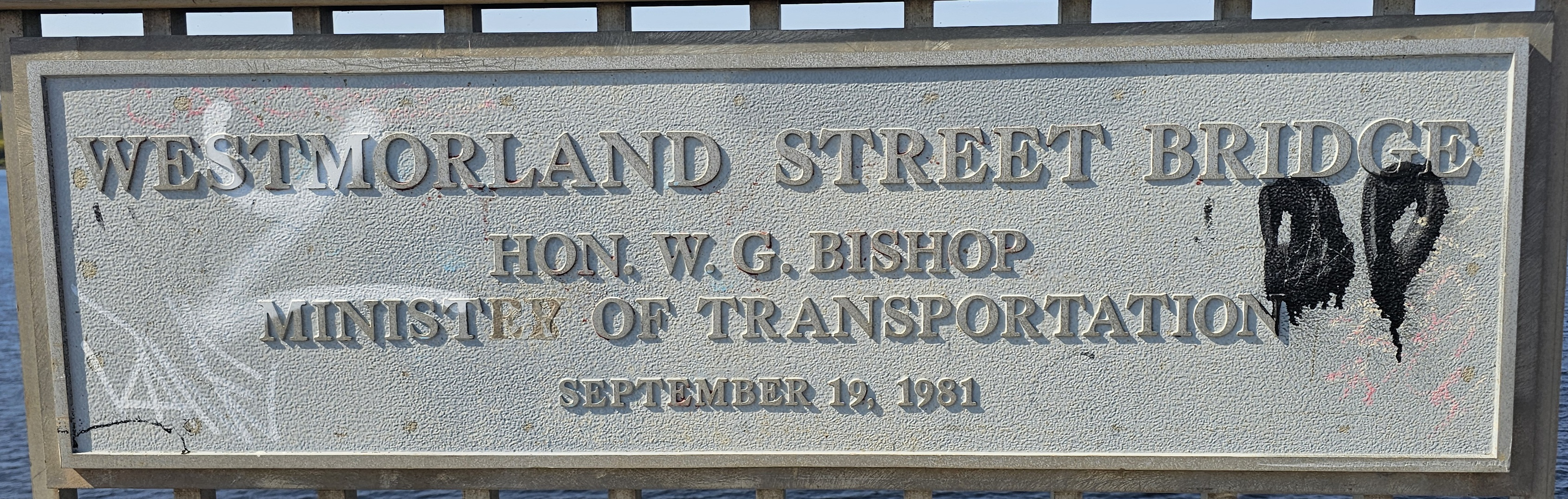
Dedication plaque affixed to the bridge

Following the completion of the Westmorland Street Bridge in 1981, the steel truss spans of the Carleton Bridge were dismantled; the bridge's piers remain in place across the river with 2 shore-bound piers on the south side being used to carry a short pedestrian bridge across Pointe-Sainte-Anne Boulevard. Another pier (second from the south side shore) became the location of a fountain, called the "Silver Spire of Inspiration", constructed in 2001 to honour New Brunswick athletes who participated in the 1996 Olympic Games in Atlanta, including Fredericton swimmer Marianne Limpert. Other than the summer of 2003, the fountain has only worked sporadically, but elements of it may have found a new home at the Grant-Harvey Arena complex, opened in 2012.

== See also ==
- List of bridges in Canada
