= New Brunswick Route 625 =

Highway in New Brunswick, Canada

Coordinates: 46.411825°N 66.615601°W

Route 625

Route information
- Maintained by New Brunswick Department of Transportation
- Length: 31 km (19 mi)

Major junctions
- North end: Route 8 in Boiestown
- South end: Route 107 in Cross Creek

Location
- Country: Canada
- Province: New Brunswick

Highway system
- Provincial highways in New Brunswick; Former routes
← Route 620	→ Route 628

Route 625 is a 31.2-kilometre (19.4 mi) long mostly north–south secondary highway in the eastern portion of New Brunswick, Canada.

The route starts at Route 8 in Boiestown where it travels east across the Taxis River before following it to the south and Southwest Miramichi River to the north. The road passes Portage Island as it enters Taxis River. It then enters Parker Ridge, crosses the Taxis River again, and turns southwest, passing Mavis Mills. It passes through Green Hill before ending at Route 107 in Cross Creek.
