= CapFriendly =

Canadian hockey website

- Screenshot Screenshot of the CapFriendly homepage on June 12, 2024.
- Company type: Private
- Available in: English, French
- Founded: 2015
- Dissolved: 2024
- Headquarters: {{{location_country}}}
- Website: https://www.capfriendly.com
- Registration: Optional
- Launched: 2015
- Current status: Defunct

CapFriendly was a Canadian hockey website that specialized in the business aspect of the National Hockey League (NHL). The site contained the contract information of NHL players and coaches in a salary cap database, as well as explanations on specific aspects of the NHL collective bargaining agreement. CapFriendly was launched in May 2015 following the closure of the website CapGeek. The site was the result of a merger with HockeysCap in 2016. It was run by partners Jamie Davis, Ryan Davis, Chris Davis and Dominik Zrim, the respective founders of HockeysCap and CapFriendly. The website began as an amateur effort and was not affiliated with the NHL, but it became known for accurate and up-to-date information with fans, and several hockey journalists regularly referencing its data and armchair general manager capability.

On September 19, 2023, CapFriendly announced SalarySwish, a website specializing in the business aspect of the National Basketball Association (NBA), and their first website that is not focused on hockey.

On June 9, 2024, it was reported that the site was set to be purchased by the Washington Capitals. The site was sunset on July 10, 2024, once the purchase was complete; it was emphasized that the site would stay functional during the 2024 NHL entry draft and the beginning of the 2024 NHL free agency period.
