= New Brunswick Route 617 =

Highway in New Brunswick, Canada

Coordinates: 46.094662°N 66.835327°W

Route 617

Route information
- Maintained by New Brunswick Department of Transportation
- Length: 12 km (7.5 mi)

Major junctions
- East end: Route 620 in Hamtown Corner
- West end: Route 104 in Burtts Corner

Location
- Country: Canada
- Province: New Brunswick

Highway system
- Provincial highways in New Brunswick; Former routes
← Route 616	→ Route 620

Route 617 is a 11.5-kilometre (7.1 mi) long, mostly east-west secondary highway in the eastern portion of New Brunswick, Canada.

The route starts at Route 620 in Hamtown Corner, where it travels east to Birdton. From here, the route turns south and passes Little Forks, Jones Forks, and MacLeans Settlement before ending in Burtts Corner at Route 104.
