= CapGeek =

Canadian hockey website

- Company type: Private
- Available in: English
- Founded: 2009
- Dissolved: January 3, 2015; 11 years ago
- Founder: Matthew Wuest
- Current status: Defunct

CapGeek was a Canadian hockey website, specializing on the business aspect of the NHL. The site featured explanations of the salary cap, the status of a players' contract, statistics, etc. Called revolutionary by hockey experts, CapGeek was launched in 2009 by Metro Halifax sports journalist Matthew Wuest. The site garnered commercial and critical success, becoming a top source for information on players' salaries and landed Wuest on The Hockey News' list of Top 100 Most Influential People in Hockey. While still an active operation, NHL teams themselves were known to have used CapGeek as a reliable source for league business affairs.

CapGeek was disbanded on January 3, 2015, due to the owner's terminal illness and his unwillingness to turn the site over to another operator. Despite being inaccessible for the prior few months, CapGeek still received an estimated 10,360 hits in May 2015.

== History ==
CapGeek.com was founded in 2009 by Mathew Wuest, a Canadian sports reporter and internet entrepreneur. Wuest worked for Metro Halifax, covering a range of sports for their paper and website, but specialized in ice hockey. On the side, Wuest ran a site that updated the progress of Detroit Red Wings prospects, which was called RedWingsCentral.com. Originally called SalaryCapCalculator.com, Wuest was persuaded by his wife to change the name to CapGeek, as it was more marketable. Wuest slowly built his site until it suddenly "exploded" in popularity, to the point that NHL teams themselves were using it as a reliable source. The site ran until January, 2015, when Wuest shocked the hockey community in closing the site. Upon entering the website, a statement was displayed, which included "This sudden decision is made with a heavy heart and is due to the personal health of CapGeek.com founder and director Matthew Wuest". By its closure, CapGeek had become so well known within the hockey world that the NHL itself reported the closure of the site with a featured article on their main webpage. Despite Wuest stating that he had no intentions of selling, offers were made, as high as "six figures" in some cases. Wuest declined all purchase inquires.

== Matthew Wuest ==
Matthew Wuest (May 11, 1979 – March 19, 2015) was a Canadian sports reporter and internet entrepreneur. Born in the small community of Stanley, New Brunswick, Wuest worked for Metro Halifax, covering a range of sports for their paper and website, but specialized in ice hockey. Before working with Metro, Wuest earned a bachelor's degree in computer science from the University of New Brunswick in 2001, following that up with a bachelor of journalism at the University of King's College in 2004. On the side, Wuest ran a site that updated the progress of Detroit Red Wings prospects, which was called RedWingsCentral.com. Matthew created CapGeek in 2009 while still working for Metro. Wuest was described as a very humble man who was passionate of his work, but never wanted attention. He rarely talked about his site in person, with one colleague revealing that he hadn't known Wuest owned CapGeek until three years into its existence, when a mutual friend informed him.

Wuest died in the early hours of March 19, 2015, at the age of 35, due to colon cancer. Many websites and reporters paid their respects, with TSN, The Hockey News, The Globe and Mail, The Toronto Star, The National Post, Sportsnet and Wuest's former employers Metro International being the notable publications. These authors and more wrote articles covering the life and career of Wuest, with some offering homepage coverage.

On May 15, 2015, the Red Wings organization announced that they would be renaming the championship trophy of their NHL prospect tournament to the Matthew Wuest Memorial Cup.

== Similar sites ==
Many ice hockey sites have since emerged with the intention of imitating CapGeek's business approach to the NHL. Examples include CapFriendly, PuckPedia.com, HockeysCap.com, GeneralFanager.com, and HockeyBuzz.com.

On May 13, 2015, HockeysCap.com was launched by Jamie, Ryan, and Chris Davis, as a tool for fans to view salary cap compliance information. The site was launched with a tool called "Armchair-GM" which allows fans to create custom rosters by trading, signing, and creating players, to determine the salary cap compliance of such team. The Davis brothers state they have the utmost respect for late CapGeek found Matthew Wuest, and that the HockeysCap.com was inspired by CapGeek.

On February 3, 2016, it was announced that CapFriendly.com and HockeysCap.com would be merged into a single website. The merged site incorporated aspects of both websites, including the "Armchair-GM" tool. The new site has retained the CapFriendly name and URL.

In early May, 2015, GeneralFanager.com was launched by Toronto Maple Leafs' fan Tom Poraszka, as a tool for fans to view salary and draft information. Poraszka was inspired by CapGeek and states that he "has a lot of respect for [Wuest]". Most of GeneralFanager's statistics were initially taken from CapGeek's archive; Poraszka has since developed insider connections to maintain up-to-date details for the latest contracts. On October 17, 2016, General Fanager was closed, as the founder, Tom Poraszka, was hired by the Vegas Golden Knights.

In June 2018, PuckPedia.com launched, with the mission to be the Ultimate Source for Hockey Fans & Professionals. The site includes salary cap and contract information, plus basic and advanced stats, and injury and transaction news. It is the only site to publish the client lists of NHL Agents, and include a ranking of agents by contract dollars
