= Taxis River, New Brunswick =

Coordinates: 46.454°N 66.471°W

Location of Taxis River in New Brunswick

Taxis River is a settlement in New Brunswick on Route 625 on the Taxis River. Taxis River is part of the Rural Community of Upper Miramichi, New Brunswick.

== History ==
The community of Taxis River is wholly in York County, New Brunswick. The following Information was gleaned from a newspaper called, Taxis River Gazette, that was published by the Taxis River School with the funds raised to go to The Red Cross to aid the war effort. This issue was #3 dated March 20, 1946 Taxis River The name of Taxis River was derived from the name Tex. Speare Tex was an Indian who had his encampment on the shore of the river which was later called Taxis River. The name Tex was usually pronounced Tax. One of the oldest residents of our community, Mr. Herbert Hinchey, has seen the remnants of the old fireplace and parts of the dwelling in which Speare Tex lived. These were located on the lower end of the intervale now owned by Mr. Allister MacMillan. The hunting grounds of Speare Tex included both sides of the Taxis River in this area. At that time the intervales were covered by trees.

This is my assumption only but I believe the original spelling was Tex's River, pronounced Tax's River, and the apostrophe later slipped down to form an "i" and became Taxis River.

I obtained these copies of the newspapers from my Aunt Noreen Addie (Munn) Nason who assisted in making up these papers in 1946. Copies have been deposited in the New Brunswick Archives.

== Notable people ==
One of the first settlers in Taxis River was Edward (Ned) Conroy. Ned married Annie Applin Curtis, from Blackville, Northumberland County, New Brunswick. Two of their daughters, Emma (Conroy) Bruce and Lila Mae (Conroy) Munn, married and stayed in the community and populated most of the inhabitants. Emma married Burton Bruce and had 10 children, 5 Boys and 5 Girls, Lila married Raymond C. Munn and had 11 children, 3 boys and 8 girls.

== See also ==
- List of communities in New Brunswick
