= Durham Bridge, New Brunswick =

Rural settlement in New Brunswick, Canada

Coordinates: 46.127002°N 66.606588°W

Location of Durham Bridge in New Brunswick

Durham Bridge is a rural settlement in York County, New Brunswick, Canada. It is located approximately 25 kilometres (16 mi) north of the provincial capital of Fredericton on New Brunswick Route 8, where its eponymous bridge crosses the Nashwaak River. Locally, there is often a distinction made between Upper and Lower Durham, differentiating the settlement north of the bridge from that south of the bridge.

== History ==
In 1989 a volunteer fire department was started, since then, the fire department has had numerous expansions.

In late April and early May 2008 major flooding occurred in most of the tributaries of the Saint John River including the Nashwaak River which runs through Durham Bridge. Numerous houses were damaged, most notably, a moderate sized campground that sits along the river, which was mostly beyond repair. The campground has since been re-opened under new owners and a new name. A number of cottages along the river were also threatened, though most were left undamaged.

== See also ==
- 2008 Saint John River flood
- List of communities in New Brunswick
- List of historic places in York County, New Brunswick
