= New Brunswick Route 148 =

Highway in New Brunswick, Canada

Route 148

Route information
- Maintained by Department of Transportation and Infrastructure

Major junctions
- South end: Route 105 in Fredericton
- Route 107 in Nashwaak Bridge
- North end: Route 8 in South Portage

Location
- Country: Canada
- Province: New Brunswick

Highway system
- Provincial highways in New Brunswick; Former routes
← Route 145	→ Route 150

Route 148 is a north–south secondary highway in New Brunswick, Canada. Most of the route was previously part of Route 8 prior to the opening of the extended Marysville Bypass.

== Route description ==
Route 148 begins at Route 105 in Fredericton, then heads north through the villages of Nashwaak Village, Durham Bridge, Ross and Pleasant Valley before ending at Route 8 in South Portage.

== History ==
This route was renumbered from Route 8 following that highway being moved to the Marysville bypass in 2014.
