= Taymouth, New Brunswick =

Coordinates: 46.182831°N 66.608133°W

Location of Taymouth in New Brunswick

Taymouth is a settlement in the Canadian province of New Brunswick. It is located 14.78 km SW of Boiestown, on the Canadian National Railway line, in Stanley Parish and St. Mary's Parish, York County. The community is centred around the intersection of Route 148 and Route 628. The former school has been turned into the Taymouth Community Centre, in which one upper floor room has become a fitness centre.

== See also ==
- List of communities in New Brunswick
