= New Brunswick Route 620 =

Highway in New Brunswick, Canada

Coordinates: 46.168122°N 66.791811°W

Route 620

Route information
- Maintained by New Brunswick Department of Transportation
- Length: 43 km (27 mi)

Major junctions
- North end: Route 107 in Nashwaak
- South end: Route 105 in Fredericton

Location
- Country: Canada
- Province: New Brunswick

Highway system
- Provincial highways in New Brunswick; Former routes
← Route 617	→ Route 625

Route 620 is a 42.5-kilometre (26.4 mi) long mostly north–south secondary highway in the eastern portion of New Brunswick, Canada.

The route starts at Route 107 in Nashwaak where it travels southwest across the Nashwaak River to Limekiln. In Boyds Corner, the route turns south to run through Tay Creek, Tay Mills, Cardigan, and Hamtown Corner. From here, the route travels past Hurlett, Carleton Lake, and Estey's Bridge. Continuing, the route travels through Royal Road and over the Nashwaak River before running on the east bank. It breaks away from the Nashwaak River as it enters Fredericton, where it is known as Royal Road. It ends at Route 105.
