= Nashwaaksis =

Neighbourhood in Fredericton, New Brunswick, Canada

Coordinates: 45.985453°N 66.649032°W

Nashwaaksis is a neighbourhood and former village in the city of Fredericton, New Brunswick; it is located on the north bank of the Saint John River and at the mouth of the Nashwaaksis Stream, which should not be confused with the larger Nashwaak River nearby. The word Nashwaaksis is corrupted from the Maliseet word for the area, Nesuwahkik, with the "-sis" appendage meaning "little Nashwaak".

== History ==
=== Fort Nashwaak ===
The Nashwaaksis area was first used for seasonal farming by the Mi'kmaq and Maliseet peoples. The first European contact was by the French in the late 17th Century, who granted the land to Joseph de Villebon. In 1691-1692, he built Fort Nashwaak, also called Fort St. Joseph, on the north side of the Saint John River at the mouth of the Nashwaak River. It replaced Fort Jemseg as the capital of Acadia. In 1696 the fort was subject to a siege by the English. After de Villebon's death in 1700 and a devastating flood, the fort was abandoned.

The site of the former fort was designated a National Historic Site of Canada in 1924.

=== British Settlement ===
Nashwaaksis was settled in the 1760s following the Seven Years' War and developed into a riverfront community opposite what would become the provincial capital at Point Ste-Anne. The community grew with improved transportation links to the city, first with ferry services, then railway and road bridges, culminating in the present Westmorland Street Bridge which includes the perimeter road Route 105 (Also known as "Ring Road" for Portion within City limits) around the neighbourhood.

The community of Nashwaaksis became a neighbourhood of Fredericton following municipal amalgamation in 1973.
