= Princess Margaret Bridge =

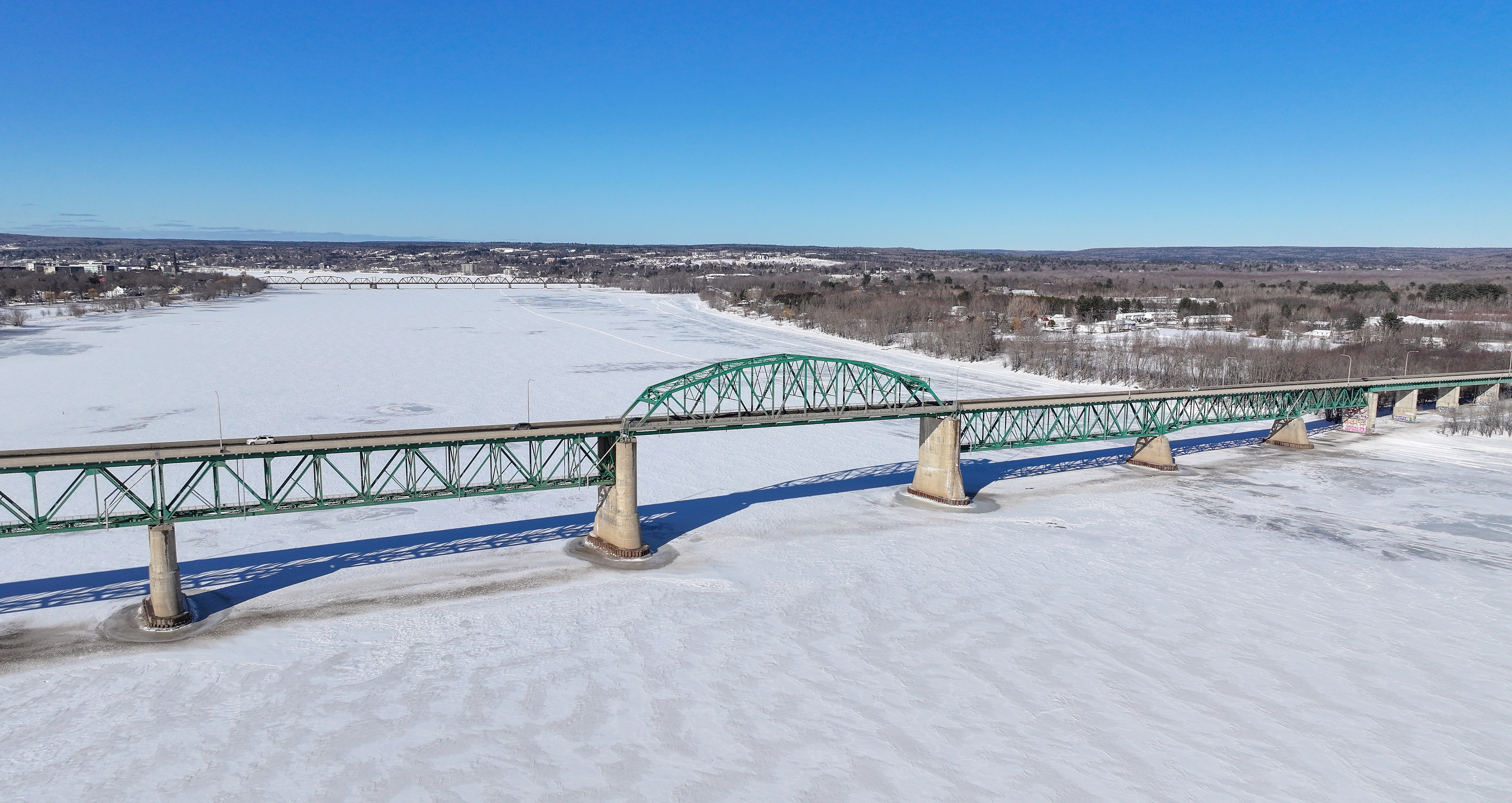
- Princess Margaret Bridge in Fredericton (2025)
- Coordinates: 45°56′28″N 66°37′35″W
- Carries: 2 lanes of NB Route 8
- Crosses: Saint John River
- Locale: Fredericton, New Brunswick, Canada
- Owner: Government of New Brunswick
- Maintained by: New Brunswick Department of Transportation and Infrastructure

Characteristics
- Design: Truss bridge
- Material: Steel
- Total length: 1,097.1 m (3,599 ft)
- Clearance above: 25 m (82 ft) (navigation)

History
- Opened: 1959

Location
- Interactive map of Princess Margaret Bridge

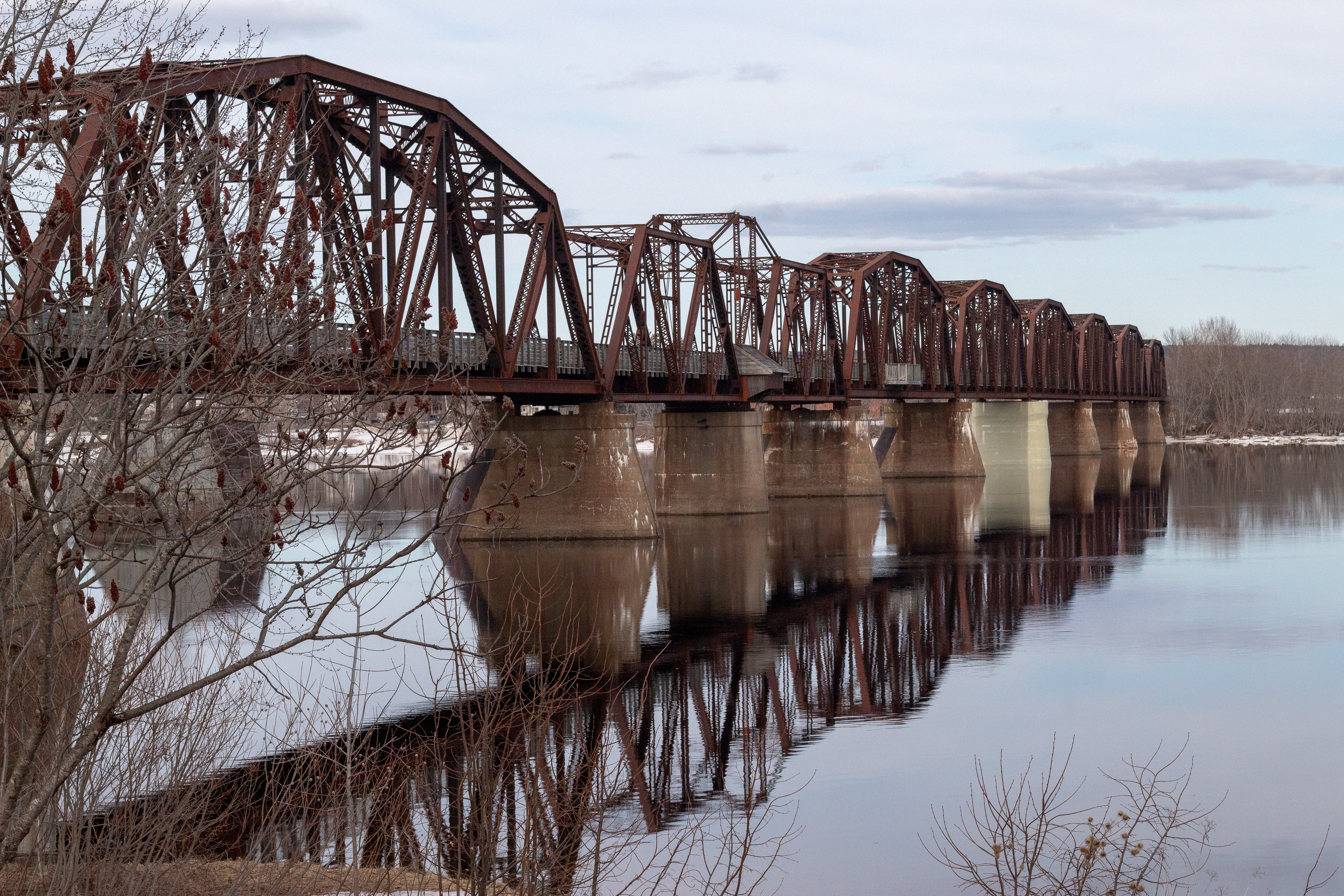
Former railway bridge upstream from the Princess Margaret Bridge

The Princess Margaret Bridge, sometimes called the Princess Margaret Rose Bridge or shortened to just PMB, is a two-lane highway bridge crossing the Saint John River at Fredericton, New Brunswick, Canada. It is named after Queen Elizabeth II's sister Princess Margaret, Countess of Snowdon.

Constructed as a steel truss structure, the bridge measures 1,097 m (3,599 ft) in length and has a navigation clearance of 25 m (82 ft) in the centre. It opened in 1959 as part of the Route 2 Trans-Canada Highway bypass project around Fredericton. Following a realignment of Route 2 in 2001, the bridge now carries Route 8, the primary Fredericton-Miramichi highway.

The northern approach follows the old Trans-Canada Highway alignment toward Barker's Point (now designated Route 105), but travellers wanting to continue on Route 8 must exit on a ramp immediately after leaving the bridge, while maintaining another sharp turning radius to pass back under the roadway and follow the Route 8 alignment to Marysville. This interchange is envisioned to be replaced by a straightened alignment of Route 8 onto the Marysville Bypass with a newly designed interchange with Route 105.

During the summer of 2010, and again in the summer of 2011, the bridge was closed for extensive repairs to the deck, concrete piers, and steel structure. The province of New Brunswick is investing $80 million for the repairs, which when complete will extend its life for another 50 years. As of April 2024, the bridge is to be closed for five weeks in the summer of 2024 to undergo more repairs. The construction in 2024 is not repairing issues from the temporary resurfacing done in the fall of 2023.

== Controversy ==
Safety concerns have precipitated many construction projects on the bridge in the 1980s and 1990s, due in part to the narrow width of the roadway and to high traffic volume. The bridge deck is prone to severe icing conditions in winter, leading to motor vehicle accidents. The bridge's narrow, two-lane span poses a hazard for motorists travelling at speeds over the posted speed limit of 70 km/h (45 mph).

The approaches to the bridge on both sides are also of concern:

The southern approach descends a steep grade while transiting from a four-lane divided freeway to two-lane suburban/rural arterial road. Pedestrians from a St. Thomas University residence on the east side of the bridge frequently take a shortcut at grade across the highway up the hill from the bridge to follow the contour of the hill while en route to the university's main campus. The southern approach also contains an interchange with Forest Hill Road with very tight turning radius on exit and entrance ramps. Northbound travellers must negotiate a sharp incline and a 30-degree turning radius to access the bridge. On three occasions, tractor trailers have failed to negotiate the turn, instead crashing through the guard rail and either dangling over the edge or falling into the river entirely.

In early May 2009, concerns were raised after a 10-kilogram chunk of concrete fell from the bridge onto the roadway underneath, narrowly missing a passing motorist's vehicle. The bridge underwent a major refurbishment in the years that followed.

== See also ==
- List of bridges in Canada
- Royal eponyms in Canada
