= New Brunswick and Nova Scotia Land Company =

- Company type: Land Settlement
- Industry: Resettlement from Britain and Europe to Maritime Canada
- Founded: 1831
- Fate: Dissolved
- Headquarters: New Brunswick, Maritime Canada
- Area served: New Brunswick; Nova Scotia
- Services: Land, roads, mills

The New Brunswick and Nova Scotia Land Company was one of several organizations which were established in Canada in the nineteenth century as a means of transferring land held by the Crown to individual owners. This company was chartered in New Brunswick in 1831.

== History ==
Several large land companies were established in the mid-nineteenth century in Canada. The Canada Company was founded in Ontario in 1824 (received its charter in 1826). The New Brunswick and Nova Scotial Land Company was created in New Brunswick in 1831, and received its charter in 1834. The British American Land Company was established in Quebec in 1832, and received its charter in 1834.

These companies, financed by shares sold in England, purchased large areas of Canadian land at low prices, promising to develop roads, mills and towns.

Over the years, the Company tried various schemes to entice settlers from various English counties. One of these promised lots of 100 acres (40 ha), and with five acres already cleared and a log house to boot. The lease was for 50 years at a rent of one shilling per acre, with an option to purchase the freehold in 20 years' time. The company also promised employment on road works, provisions at moderate prices, and medical assistance, and offered to advance the cost of transit as a loan.
