= Penniac, New Brunswick =

Coordinates: 46.035°N 66.572°W

Penniac is a small rural community in the Canadian province of New Brunswick, located about 10 kilometres (6.2 miles) northeast of Fredericton. The name Penniac may mean "fork in the river".

== Culture ==
Penniac hosts a recreation centre, whose activities include community breakfasts and suppers, darts, exercise groups, fundraisers and children's events.

=== Penniac United Church ===
The Penniac United Church is active throughout the year. The church has been a part of the community for over 150 years. The Penniac United Church is over 130 years old. There are several stories on how it came to be in the location it presently stands. One recollection is that Alexander Boss Gibson had a desire for there to be a church in Penniac and had the church constructed. Another story says that the church was originally located along the Nashwaak River, but then was relocated to the present location. There is also a well-maintained cemetery at the church.

=== Penniac Baptist Church ===
Historically, there have been multiple places of worship in the Penniac - Mount Hope area. During much of the 20th century, there were two churches in the area. One was the Penniac United Church (as discussed above) and the other was the Penniac Baptist Church. The Penniac Baptist Church stopped functioning as a regular place of worship within the last couple decades. Very recently, however, there has been a local movement to restore the Penniac Baptist Church.

== Nature ==
Historically, Penniac has had a strong connection to the natural world. Many of the original settlers were granted land from the Crown. These land grants are distributed along the main waterway, the Penniac Stream. Many of the land grants are still intact. Most families in the area either currently, or in the recent past were involved with farming, hunting, guiding, fishing, or logging. More currently, there are also Snowmobile Clubs, ATV Clubs, Jeep Clubs and Mountain biking trails in the area. In the early 2000s, the part of the lower portion of Penniac began to become somewhat more urbanized, however, the remainder of Penniac has retained its more rural culture.

=== Mountain biking ===
Penniac is home to many mountain biking trails which stretch throughout the entire community.

== See also ==
- List of communities in New Brunswick
