= New Brunswick Route 107 =

Highway in New Brunswick, Canada

Route 107

Route information
- Maintained by New Brunswick Department of Transportation
- Length: 100.07 km (62.18 mi)
- Existed: 1965–present

Major junctions
- East end: Route 8 in Nashwaak Bridge
- West end: Route 105 in Bristol

Location
- Country: Canada
- Province: New Brunswick
- Major cities: Nashwaak, Napadogan, Juniper, Glassville

Highway system
- Provincial highways in New Brunswick; Former routes
← Route 106	→ Route 108

Route 107 is a highway in New Brunswick, Canada; running from an intersection with Route 8 at Nashwaak Bridge to an intersection with Route 105 at Bristol; a distance of 100.1 kilometres.

Route 107 starts east of Nashwaak Bridge travelling south-west crossing Route 148 and into Nashwaak Bridge. From here, the route crosses the Nashwaak River before turning north-west and passing through Sutherland Siding. From here, the route is known as "Irishtown Rd" as it enters the community of Nashwaak. The route then turns north-east until Cross Creek, and northwest at Route 625. Through mostly uninhabited forest land, through Williamsburg then the railway siding of Napadogan as it passes Miramichi Lake then meets up and begins to follow the south bank of the Southwest Miramichi River as it passes Deersdale, to the community of Juniper. Route 107 runs southwest from Juniper then through Biggar Ridge then Foreston, Argyle, Highlands then through Glassville at the intersection of Route 580. The route then travels through Gordonville at the intersection of Route 570, then Fielding to its end in Florenceville-Bristol.

== History ==
The road now known as Route 107 was not fully completed until the late 1950s, when the section between Napadogan and Juniper opened. The section between Nashwaak Bridge and Nashwaak was known as Route 25A until 1965, when the current number was applied.

Prior to the opening of the Marysville Bypass in 2014, the route used to end at now Route 148

== See also ==
- List of New Brunswick provincial highways
