= Parker Ridge, New Brunswick =

Community in New Brunswick, Canada

Coordinates: 46.455°N 66.515°W

Location of Parker Ridge in New Brunswick

Parker Ridge is a Canadian community in the rural community of Upper Miramichi in York County, New Brunswick.

== See also ==
- List of communities in New Brunswick
