= Nashwaak River =

Coordinates: 45°57′56.5″N 66°35′10.3″W

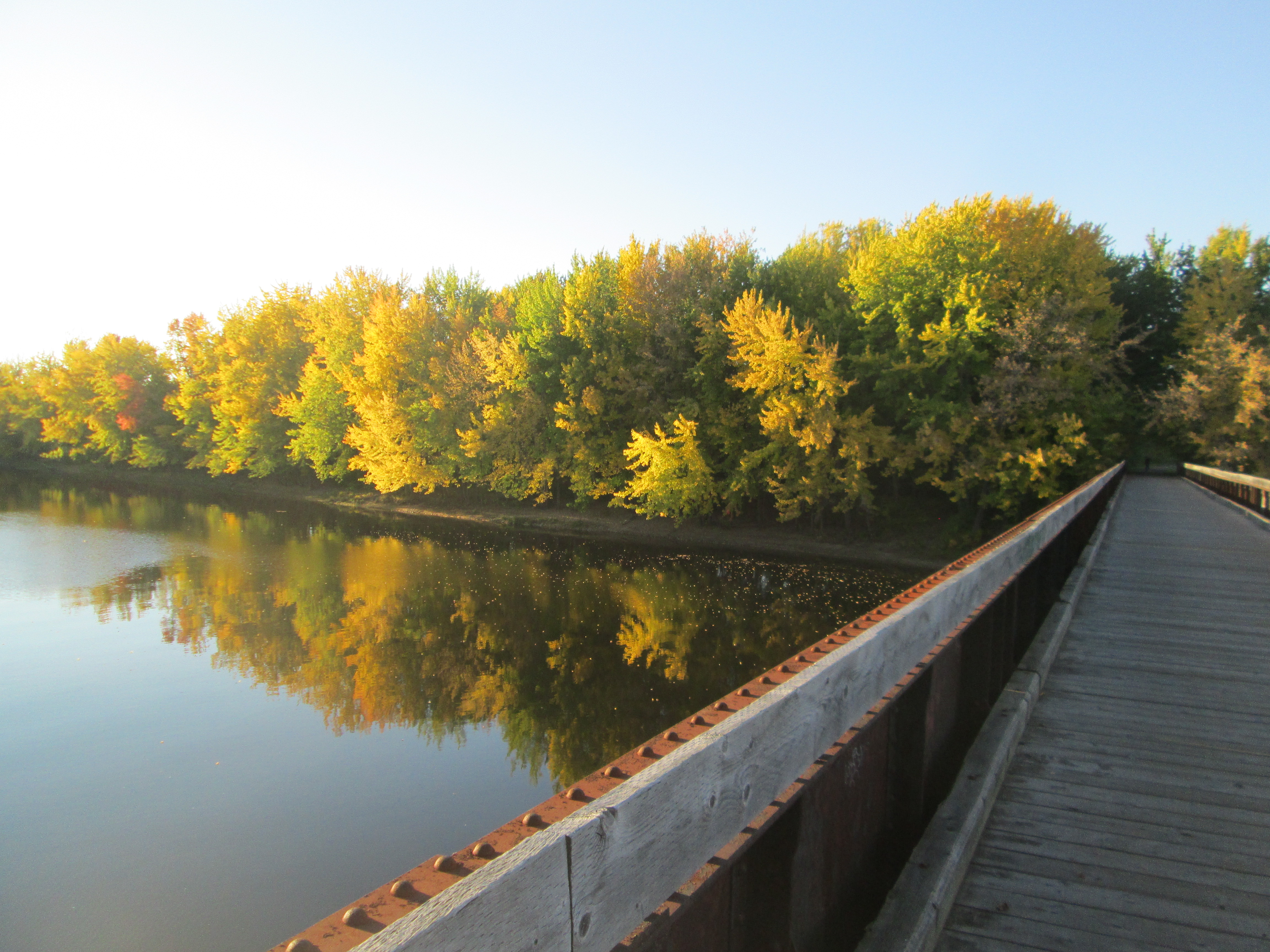
- The Nashwaak River from the Gibson Trail footbridge, a former railway bridge converted for pedestrian and bicycle use.
- Etymology: Wolastoqey, meaning disputed. Some common translations are slow current, halfway-place, and strong undercurrent

Location
- Country: Canada
- Province: New Brunswick

Physical characteristics
- Source: Nashwaak Lake
- Mouth: Fredericton
- Length: 113 km (70 mi)
- Basin size: 1,705,989 km^{2} (658,686 mi^{2})

Basin features
- River system: Saint John River
- Tributaries
  - left: Lake Brook Napadogan Brook Cross Creek Youngs Brook McLean Brook Manzer Brook Penniac Stream Campbell Creek
  - right: Tay River Dunbar Stream Bradley Brook Gunter Brook McCanaghy Brook Kaine Creek

The Nashwaak River, located in west-central New Brunswick, Canada, is a tributary of the Saint John River. It is 113 kilometres long, draining an area of roughly 1,706 km^{2} (659 sq mi). The river drains south from Nashwaak Lake (southeast of the village of Juniper) before turning east to flow through the village of Stanley and the community of Nashwaak, continuing southeast to Nashwaak Bridge and then south through several rural communities such as Taymouth, Durham Bridge, Nashwaak Village, and Penniac before entering Fredericton through Marysville and dividing the neighbourhoods of Barkers Point and Devon. Its mouth is divided by a small island before it spills into the Saint John River.

It was used heavily by the Wolastoqey people as a transportation route to northwestern New Brunswick. A French fort, Fort Nashwaak, was built somewhere near the river's mouth in 1692 and was the first European settlement in the Fredericton area. It was captured by the British in 1696, and land along the river was later granted to United Empire Loyalists during the American Revolution. Further settlement occurred through the 19th century.

A rail line (the former Canadian National Nashwaak subdivision) and Route 8, both important links from southern to northern New Brunswick, were built along the river's shore. The Nashwaak subdivision's rails were removed in 1995, and it is now an ATV and walking trail. In addition to the Nashwaak subdivision, the Minto subdivision, which passed from South Devon to Minto crossing the Nashwaak near its mouth, and has also since been converted to a walking trail (in-city) and ATV trail (out-of-city). A walking trail makes use of the right-of-way created by a short rail spur that used to followed the river on its east bank from Barkers Point to the Marysville Cotton Mill.

Today, the river is popular for recreational paddling, fishing, and tubing, while the trails alongside it are attractive for ATV riding and bicycling.

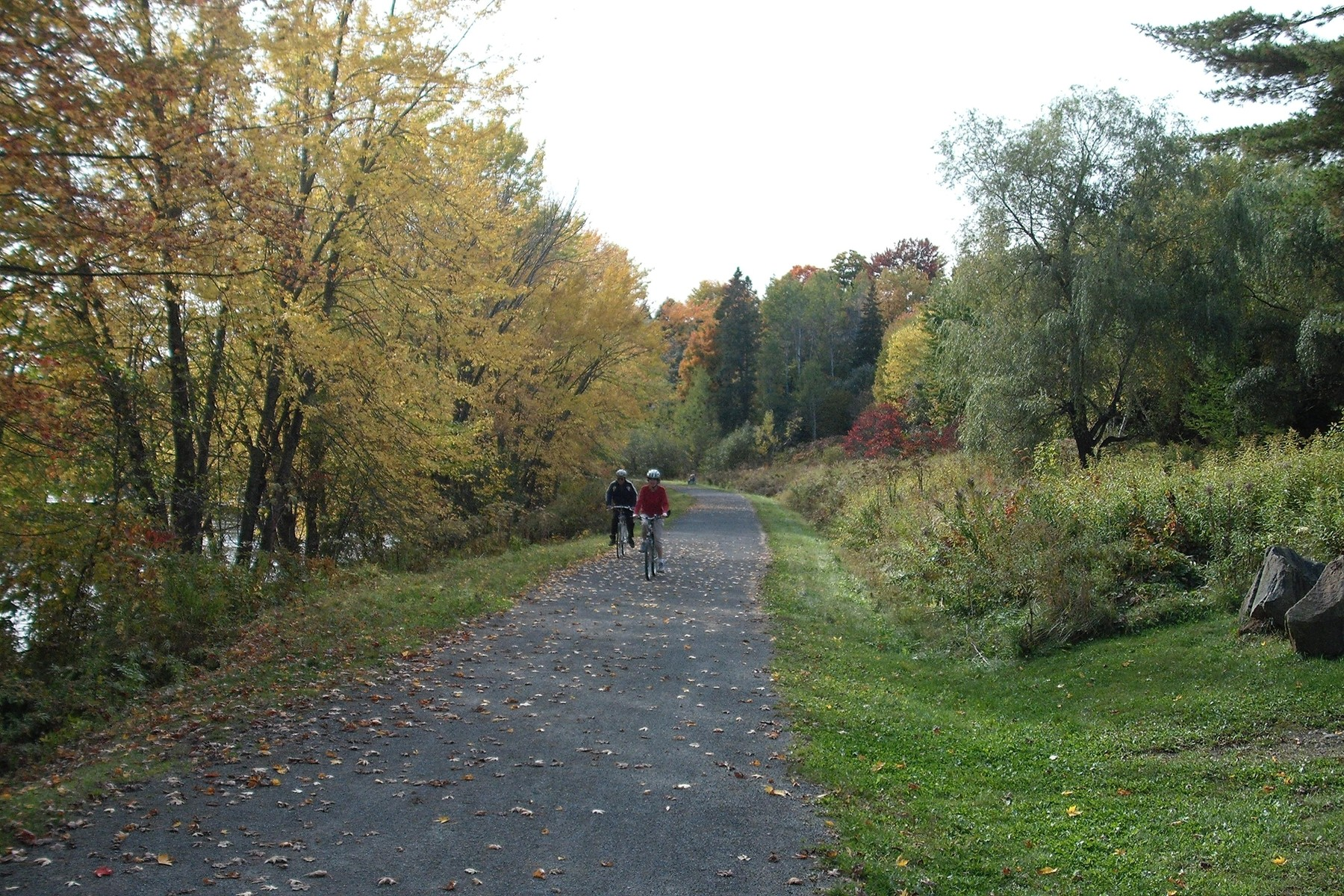
Nashwaak River trail

== Ecological issues ==
=== Salmon ===
Atlantic salmon were plentiful in the Nashwaak River in the 19th century, but salmon populations in the entire Saint John River Basin plummeted through the 20th century. This has been attributed to a combination of habitat destruction by lumbering, mining and agriculture, overfishing, damming of rivers and aquaculture. Many of the factors apply in the Nashwaak basin. In the Nashwaak river, salmon counts declined from around 2,000 in the 1970s, to a few dozen in the 2010s. Salmon fishing has been banned since 1998. The Campbell Creek dam in Marysville was removed in 2021, in an attempt to increase viable spawning habitat.

Aquaculture practices from upstream in the Saint John River have caused a dramatic drop in the salmon population of the Nashwaak river. In the past, the river was known for its abundance of salmon but fish numbers have decreased due to farming in various locations along the Saint John and in the Bay of Fundy. Fish raised in these hatcheries do not tend to migrate along their natural predecessors' routes up the Nashwaak as they once did due to the removal of a biological memory system developed over the ages to ensure their survival and propagation. Modern dams and netting practices prevent the fish from returning to previously established spawning routes. Over time this practice has altered the memory of the species and therefore diminished the number previously documented in the Nashwaak river system.

This process has been documented as being problematic in other locations around the world; as Ellen Wohl points out, "Similar attempts either to provide fish passage around a dam or to breed fish in a hatchery have been dismal failures for salmon and other species in the United States."

== Nashwaak Watershed Association Inc. ==
The Nashwaak Watershed Association Incorporated (NWAI) is a non-profit organization established in 1995 to promote, protect, and restore the water, land, flora, and fauna within the Nashwaak watershed. Its programs include replanting and restoration of floodplain forests previously converted to farmland, riverbank erosion mitigation, fish passage restoration (culvert remediation/removal, dam removal), and species-at-risk monitoring (including Outer Bay of Fundy Atlantic salmon and bank swallows).

Notable achievements of the organization include the coordination of the removal of the 1919 Campbell Creek dam, and the replanting of, and designation of, the Marysville Flats as a conservation easement.

== See also ==
- List of bodies of water of New Brunswick
