= Nashwaak, New Brunswick =

Nashwaak
- Rural community
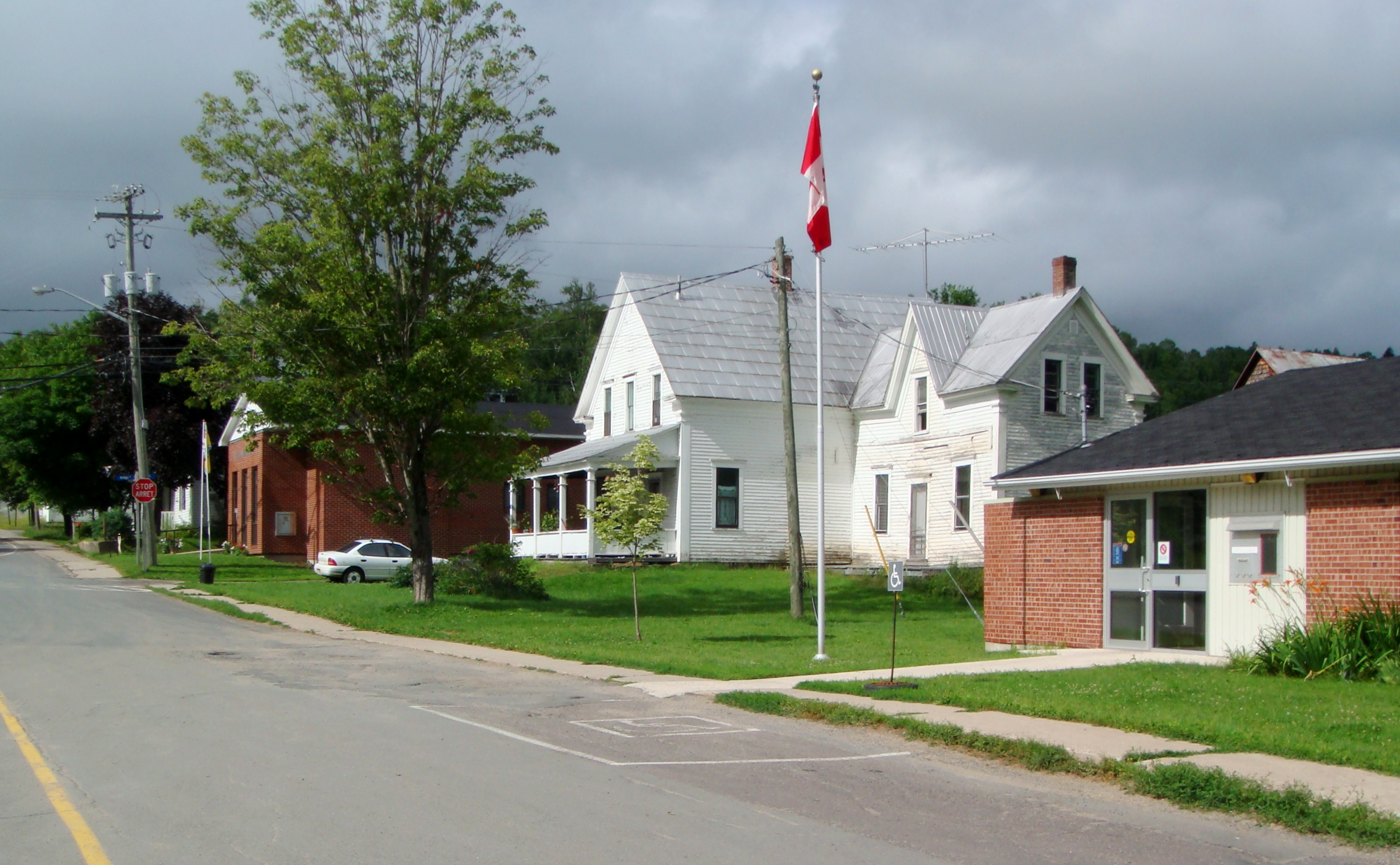
- View of Nashwaak

- Location within New Brunswick
- Coordinates: 46°27′7.9″N 66°59′2.9″W
- Country: Canada
- Province: New Brunswick
- County: York County
- Regional service commission: Capital Region
- Incorporated: January 1, 2023

Government
  - Mayor: David Sweeney
- Time zone: UTC-4 (AST)
  - Summer (DST): UTC-3 (ADT)
- Area code: Area code 506

Nashwaak is a rural community in the Canadian province of New Brunswick. It was formed through the 2023 New Brunswick local governance reforms.

== History ==
Nashwaak was incorporated on January 1, 2023. It encompasses the former village of Stanley, as well as portions of the local service districts of Stanley, Saint Marys, Estey's Bridge, and Douglas.

The Nashwaak River, which runs through the community, was historically a vital transportation route for the Wolastoqiyik (Maliseet) people, who used it for trade and communication via portage routes connecting major watersheds, with evidence of their presence in the area dating back at least 11,000 years.

== Notable people ==
- Matthew Wuest: Sports reporter and founder of CapGeek

== See also ==
- List of communities in New Brunswick
- List of municipalities in New Brunswick
