= Aroostook =

Aroostook may refer to:

- Aroostook Band of Micmacs, a tribe of Mi'kmaq people in Aroostook County, Maine U.S.
- Aroostook, New Brunswick, Canada
- Aroostook County, Maine, U.S.
- Aroostook River, in Maine
- Aroostook War, an 1838–1839 boundary dispute between the British colony of New Brunswick and the U.S. state of Maine
- USS Aroostook
