= Tinker (disambiguation) =

Tinker is an archaic term for an itinerant tinsmith who mends household utensils.

Tinker may also refer to:

== Arts and entertainment ==
=== Fictional characters ===
- Tinker, the fictional assistant to detective Sexton Blake in British comic strips and novels
- Colonel Tinker, a minor fictional character in the Southern Victory Series novel How Few Remain by Harry Turtledove
- Tinker Dill, a fictional character in the British TV series Lovejoy
- Tinkers, the main protagonists of Vernor Vinge's book The Peace War
- Tuatha'an (or Tinkers) of Robert Jordan's The Wheel of Time
- Tinker Knight, a boss in Shovel Knight
- Alexander Graham Bell ("Tinker"), the title character of Wen Spencer's 2003 novel Tinker

=== Literature ===
- Tinker, a novel by Wen Spencer
- Tinkers (novel), a novel by American author Paul Harding
- "The Tinker", a short story from Orson Scott Card

=== Other uses in arts and entertainment ===
- Microsoft Tinker, a puzzle game
- Tinker, a 1949 British film directed and co-written by Herbert Marshall
- Tinker (band), a Canadian alternative rock band
- Tinker!, an American science-fiction film (2018) starring Clayne Crawford

== Places ==
- Tinkers Creek and its variations, a number of rivers, streams, and creeks.

=== United States ===
- Tinker Air Force Base in Oklahoma
- Tinker Cobblestone Farmstead, on the National Register of Historic Places in Henrietta, New York

=== Elsewhere ===
- Tinker, New Brunswick, Canada
- Tinker Dam, New Brunswick, Canada
- Tinker Glacier, Antarctica

== People ==
=== Surname ===
- Tinker (surname), includes a list of people with this surname

=== Given name ===
- Tinker Hatfield (born 1952), Nike shoe designer
- Tinker Keck (born 1976), American fitness trainer and former professional gridiron football player

=== Nickname ===
- Tinker Beets (Derrick John Beets, born 1941), Rhodesian former field hockey player and cricketer
- Tinker Fox (John Fox, 1610–1650), Parliamentarian colonel during the English Civil War
- Tinker Juarez (David Juarez, born 1961), American former bicycle racer
- Tinker Owens (Charles Wayne Owens, born 1954), American former professional gridiron football player

== Sports arenas ==
- Tinker Field, a baseball stadium in Orlando, Florida, named for Hall-of-Fame baseball player Joe Tinker
- Tinker Park, a former baseball ground in Indianapolis, Indiana, named for Tinker Street

== Other uses ==
- Tinker (software), software for molecular dynamics simulation
- Tinker, the UK's first medical diabetes alert dog
- Tinker Building, Orlando, Florida, on the National Register of Historic Places
- Tinker Federal Credit Union, a credit union headquartered in Oklahoma City, Oklahoma
- Tinker v. Des Moines Independent Community School District, a 1969 Supreme Court case
- Tinkers, an alternate (and often pejorative) name for the itinerant groups in Europe, including Irish Travellers, Scottish Travellers, and Romani people

== See also ==
- Gypsy Vanner horse, also known as the Tinker horse
- Tink (disambiguation)
- Tinkers (disambiguation)
- Tinker Bell, fairy companion of Peter Pan
