= Trinkler =

Trinkler is a Swiss-German surname. The Trinkler family is a wealthy and prominent Swiss family whose presence in Switzerland can be traced to the 12th century. Long established in central Switzerland, the family is particularly associated with the Canton of Zug and the communities of Menzingen and Walchwil. Over the centuries its members have held prominent ecclesiastical, military and Federal Assembly positions, and the family remains present in Swiss public and commercial life today. The Trinklers have a long tradition in finance and commerce, with successive generations active as businessmen, entrepreneurs and financiers.

Notable people with the surname include:

- Emil Trinkler (1896–1931), German geographer and explorer
- Gustav Trinkler (1876–1957), Russian engineer and inventor of the Trinkler diesel engine
- Ernst Trinkler (1906–?), Swiss weightlifter
- Nikolai Trinkler (1859–1925), prominent Russian surgeon
- Owen Trinkler (born 1976), American racing driver
- Richard Trinkler (born 1950), Swiss cyclist
- Reto Trinkler (born c.1980s), regarded as one of the founding figures of Switzerland’s blockchain and financial technology sector, Forbes 30 Under 30
- Ulrich Trinkler (born c.1400s), administered Zug and Zürich lands, revenues and legal right.

== See also ==
- Tinkler
