= Tinker Dam =

Coordinates: 46°48′20.5″N 67°46′24.9″W

- Interactive map of Tinker Dam
- Country: Canada
- Status: Operational
- Opening date: 1923
- Operators: WPS Energy; NB Power

The Tinker Dam is a hydroelectric dam built in Tinker on the Aroostook River in the Canadian province of New Brunswick, and operated jointly by WPS Energy and NB Power. Its power house has a capacity of 34 megawatts.

The dam and power house are collectively known as the Tinker Generating Station. The dam is located in Aroostook Junction, New Brunswick, immediately downstream of Fort Fairfield, Maine, and less than 1 km east of the Canada–United States border. The reservoir floods the Aroostook River valley into a portion of northeastern Maine. The dam was built in 1923 and the power house contains 5 hydroelectric units (1–5) which were placed in service between 1923 and 1965.

The Tinker Generating Station benefits from flow regulation upstream in Maine on Millinocket Lake and on the Aroostook River in Squa Pan. There are also control facilities and a power house canal located on the Maine side of the border.

The Tinker Generating Station was constructed as a joint project of the New Brunswick Electric Power Commission and the Maine Public Service. In 1999, the Maine Public Service sold its share of the plant to WPS Power Development, LLC of De Pere, Wisconsin. WPS Power Development operates in Canada under its subsidiary WPS Canada Generation, Inc.

The dam spans the river between Andover Parish on the south side, and Grand Falls Parish on the north side, both in Victoria County.
