= Andover Parish, New Brunswick =

Andover
- Parish
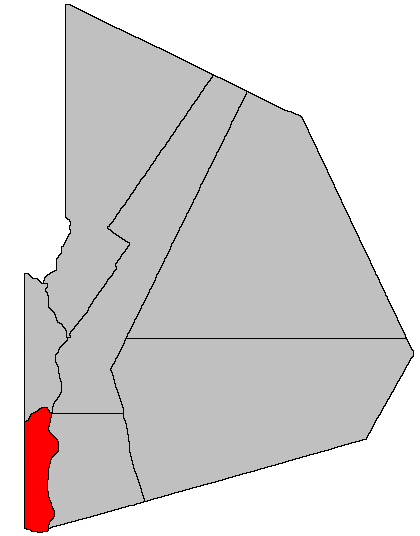
- Location within Victoria County, New Brunswick.
- Coordinates: 46.705°N 67.76°W
- Country: Canada
- Province: New Brunswick
- County: Victoria
- Erected: 1833

Area
  - Land: 123.42 km^{2} (47.65 sq mi)

Population (2021)
  - Total: 879
  - Density: 7.1/km^{2} (18/sq mi)
  - Change 2016-2021: ▼1.3%
  - Dwellings: 387
- Time zone: UTC-4 (AST)
  - Summer (DST): UTC-3 (ADT)
- Figures do not include portions within the villages of Aroostook and Perth-Andover

Andover is a geographic parish in Victoria County, New Brunswick, Canada.

Prior to the 2023 governance reform, for governance purposes it was divided between the villages of Aroostook and Perth-Andover and the local service district of the parish of Andover, all of which were members of the Western Valley Regional Service Commission (WVRSC).

== Origin of name ==
Historian William F. Ganong related that the local explanation was that it was named by a Mr. Sisson, who came from Andover, England.

== History ==
Andover was erected in 1833 in Carleton County from Kent Parish. The parish extended to above Grand Falls, New Brunswick, taking in most of Grand Falls Parish.

In 1850 the parish was extended north to where the Saint John River crosses the international boundary.

In 1853 all of Andover north of the Aroostook River was included in the newly erected Grand Falls Parish.

== Boundaries ==
Andover Parish is bounded:

- on the north by the Aroostook River;
- on the east by the Saint John River;
- on the south by the River de Chute, which forms the Victoria County line;
- on the west by the American border.

== Communities ==
Communities at least partly within the parish. bold indicates an incorporated municipality

- **Aroostook**
- Bairdsville
- Beaconsfield
- Blue Hill
- Carlingford
- Dover Hill
- Good Corner
- Hillandale
- **Perth-Andover**
- River de Chute
- Tinker
- Turner Settlement

== Bodies of water ==
Bodies of water (Note: Not including brooks, ponds or coves.) at least partly within the parish.

- Aroostook River
- River de Chute
- Saint John River
- Bishop Lake
- Blind Lake
- Tomlinson Lake

== Other notable places ==
Parks, historic sites, and other noteworthy places at least partly within the parish.

- Demerchant Brook Protected Natural Area
- Tinker Dam

== Demographics ==
Parish population totals do not include the former incorporated villages of Aroostook and portion within Perth-Andover. Revised census figures based on the 2023 local governance reforms have not been released.

=== Population ===
**Population trend**

Census	Population	Change (%)
2016	891	▼5.4%
2011	942	▲10.0%
2006	856	▼14.7%
2001	1,003	▼9.1%
1996	1,104	▲0.9%
1991	1,094	N/A

=== Language ===
**Mother tongue (2016)**

Language	Population	Pct (%)
English only	810	91.0%
French only	35	3.9%
Both English and French	0	0%
Other languages	45	5.1%

== See also ==
- List of parishes in New Brunswick
