= Diasporus quidditus =

Conservation status
- Least Concern (IUCN 3.1)

Scientific classification
- Kingdom: Animalia
- Phylum: Chordata
- Class: Amphibia
- Order: Anura
- Family: Eleutherodactylidae
- Genus: Diasporus
- Species: D. quidditus

Binomial name
- Diasporus quidditus (Lynch, 2001)

Synonyms
- Eleutherodactylus quidditus Lynch, 2001; Pristimantis quidditus (Lynch, 2001)

Species of amphibian

Diasporus quidditus is a species of frogs in the family Eleutherodactylidae. It is found in eastern Panama and northwestern Colombia (Chocó, Antioquia, and Valle del Cauca Departments). The specific name quidditus is derived from English word quiddity, which the describer John Douglas Lynch encountered in the book "Quiddities: An Intermittently Philosophical Dictionary" by Willard Van Orman Quine; he thought the name was apt because the species was small and had been confused with Diasporus vocator and Diasporus gularis.

== Description ==
Adult males measure 11–15 mm (0.4–0.6 in) and adult females 13–17 mm (0.5–0.7 in) in snout–vent length. The head is narrower than the body and longer than it is wide. The snout is subovoid in dorsal view and rounded or subtruncate in lateral view. The tympanum is round and has its upper edge hidden by the supra-tympanic fold. The fingers have thick lateral keels and elongated discs. The toes are basally webbed and have lanceolate discs. There are low warts scattered all over the dorsum, upper flanks, and the upper sides of the limbs. The dorsum is brown with some orange high-lites and a cream interorbital bar. The ventral surfaces are black with white flecks. The hidden surfaces of the limbs are brown. The iris is brown.

== Habitat and conservation ==
Diasporus quidditus occurs humid tropical and Sub-Andean forests at elevations of 50–1,770 m (160–5,810 ft) above sea level. It inhabits both primary and secondary forests and forest edges, but does not occur outside forests. It is a terrestrial and arboreal species. Although a common species, the small size makes these frogs difficult to find. It can be locally threatened by habitat loss.
