= South Victoria =

South Victoria may refer to:

- South Victoria (electoral district), in British Columbia, Canada
- South Victoria, Nova Scotia, a community in Canada

== See also ==
- Southern Victoria, New Brunswick, a village in Canada
- Victoria South (disambiguation)
