= Millinocket Lake =

Millinocket Lake may refer to:

- Millinocket Lake (Aroostook River), lake north of Baxter State Park, Maine
- Millinocket Lake (Penobscot River), lake near Millinocket, Maine
