= Four Falls Border Crossing =

Former Canada–US border crossing

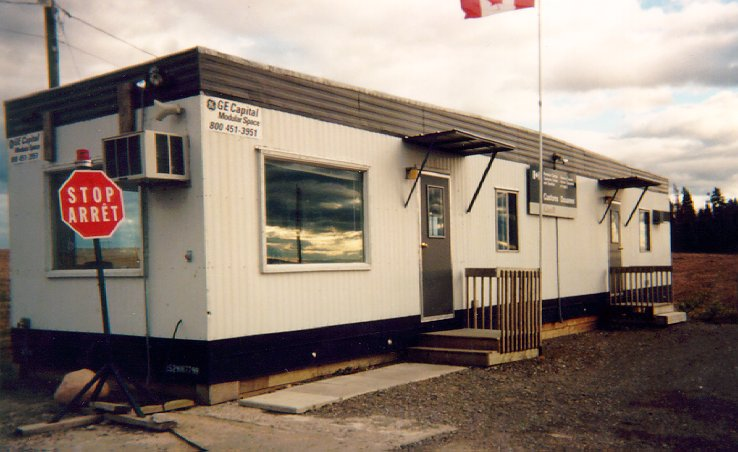
- The Canada Border Inspection Station at Four Falls, New Brunswick as seen in 1998

Location
- Country: United States; Canada
- Location: At the intersection of Russell and Brown Roads; No access from Canada to the US; US Port: None; Canadian Port: 415 Brown Road, Four Falls NB E3Z 2C6
- Coordinates: 46.823392°N 67.789625°W

Details
- Opened: 1934
- Closed: 2020

Website
- http://www.cbsa-asfc.gc.ca/do-rb/offices-bureaux/99-eng.html

The Four Falls Border Crossing was a one-way crossing between Fort Fairfield, Maine and Four Falls, New Brunswick on the Canada–US border. Traffic was, until 2020, seasonally permitted to enter Canada at this location, but not vice versa per immigration and customs laws. It was the only Canada-entry-only border crossing with the United States. The border crossing was temporarily closed owing to the COVID-19 pandemic in 2020, with said closure being made permanent in 2026.

== History ==
This crossing opened in 1934, and traffic was permitted in both directions. In the late 1950s, the US closed its border station; however Canada continued to operate its border station until April 1, 1985. Both border stations were demolished after their respective closures. In 1994, the Government of Canada relented to pressure from members of the nearby Aroostook Valley Country Club to reopen the crossing during golf season. The US government refused to reopen its border station, but it allowed vehicles to enter as long as they proceeded only as far as the golf course, or if they traveled directly to an open US border inspection station to report for inspection.

After the September 11 attacks, the United States changed its entry policies, requiring all travelers to enter at an open border inspection station. This meant that Canadian golfers could not enter the US via Brown Road, and even Canadian residents who can only access their homes via Russell Road could not legally drive to their homes from Canada.

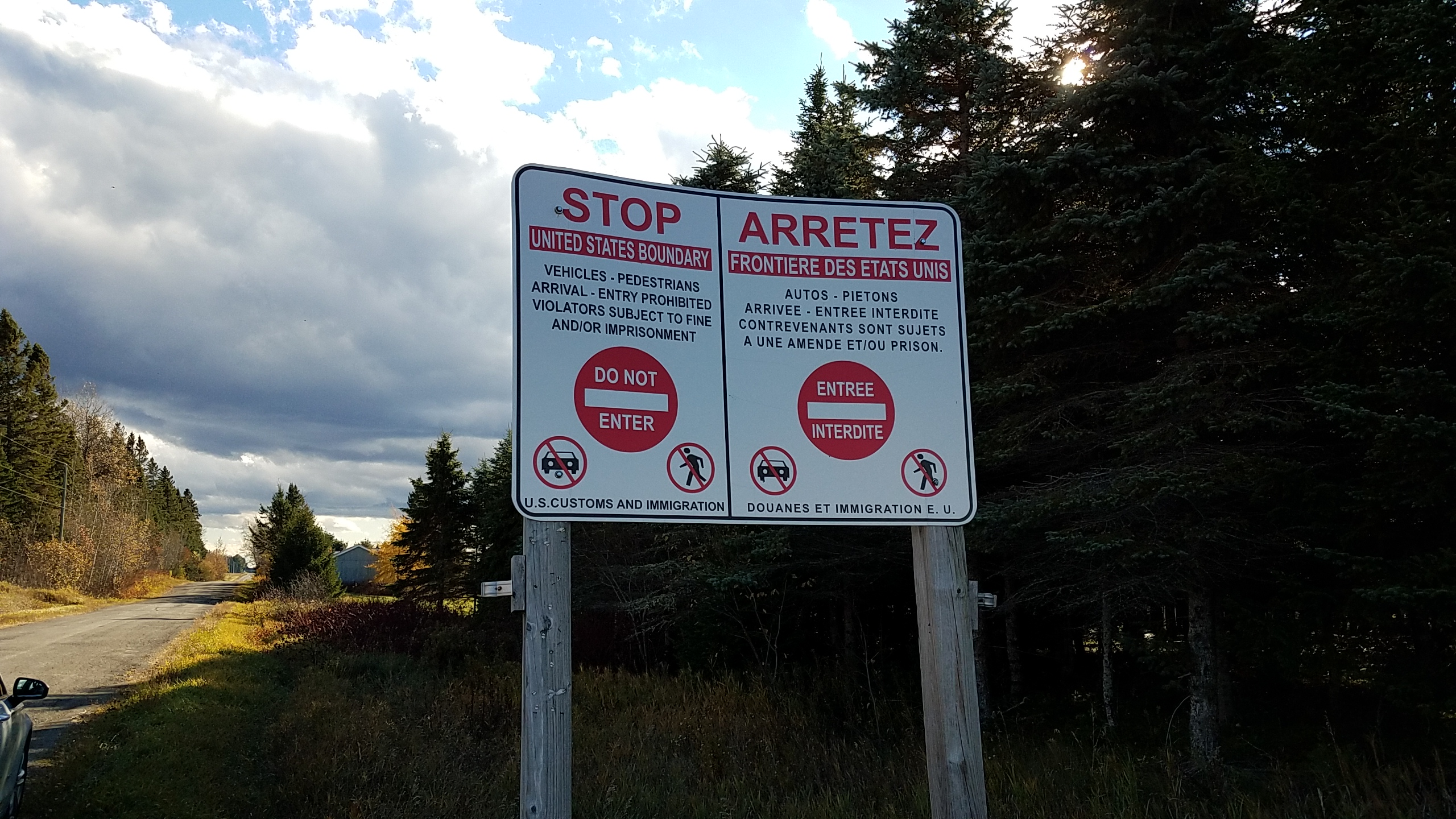
Bilingual sign banning entry into the United States via Brown Road

== See also ==
- List of Canada–United States border crossings
- Aroostook Valley Country Club
- Churubusco-Franklin Centre Border Crossing, a Canada-to-U.S.-only border crossing
