= Tinkers =

Tinkers may refer to:

- An alternate (and often pejorative) name for the itinerant groups in Europe, including Irish Travellers, Scottish Travellers, and Romani people
- The plural of tinker, an archaic term for an itinerant tinsmith who mends household utensils
- Tinkers (novel), a 2009 novel by American author Paul Harding
- Tinkers Alley, an old urban downtown in Niš, Serbia
- Tinkers Copse, a nature reserve on the northwestern outskirts of Bracknell in Berkshire, England, U.K.
- Tinkers Creek (Cuyahoga River tributary), in Ohio, U.S.
  - Tinkers Creek Aqueduct, in Valley View, Ohio
  - Tinkers Creek State Park, in Streetsboro, Ohio
- Tinkers Green Halt railway station, a former station in Oswestry, Shropshire, England
- Tinkers Hill, along the Herefordshire-Worcestershire border in England, U.K
- Tinkers Station, former name of a community now known as Soda Springs, Nevada County, California, U.S.

== See also ==
- Tink (disambiguation)
- Tinker (disambiguation)
