= Perth-Andover =

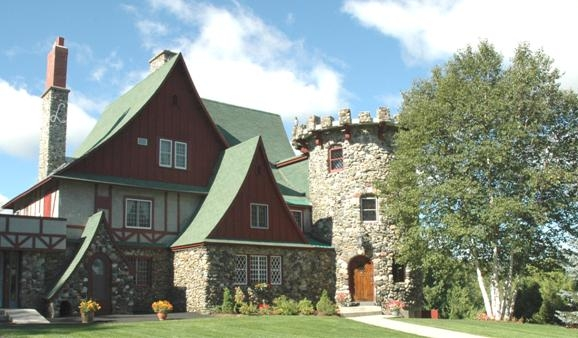
- The Castle Inn

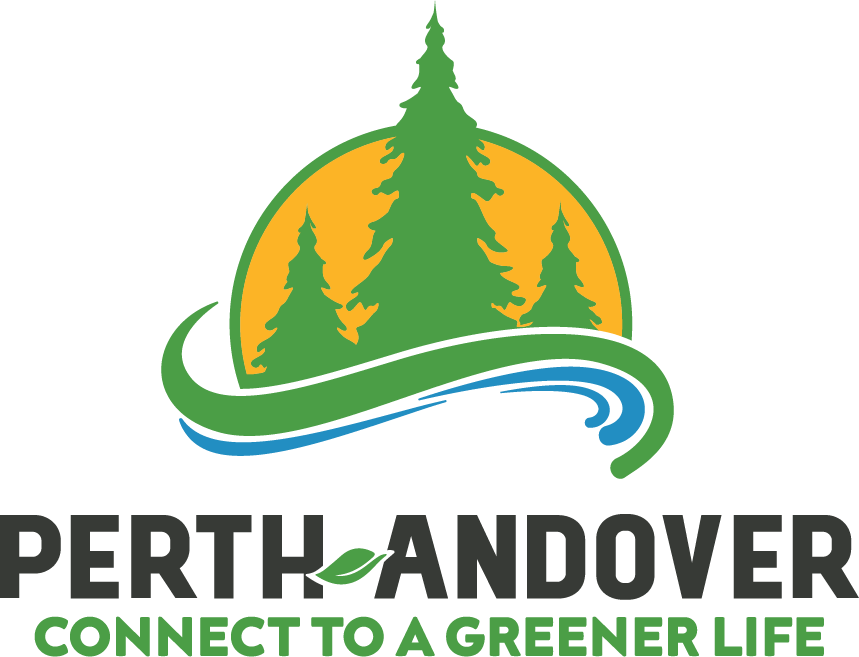
- Seal
- Motto: Connect to a Greener Life
- Location within New Brunswick
- Coordinates: 46.73927°N 67.69840°W
- Country: Canada
- Province: New Brunswick
- County: Victoria
- Municipality: Southern Victoria
- Established: 1966

Government
  - MP: Richard Bragdon (Con.)
  - MLA: Margaret Johnson (Conservative)

Area
  - Land: 8.97 km^{2} (3.46 sq mi)
- Highest elevation: 183 m (600 ft)
- Lowest elevation: 130 m (430 ft)

Population (2021)
  - Total: 1,574
  - Density: 175.6/km^{2} (455/sq mi)
  - Change (2016–21): ▼1.0%
- Time zone: UTC-4 (Atlantic (AST))
  - Summer (DST): UTC-3 (ADT)
- Canadian Postal code: E7H
- Area code: 506
- Telephone Exchange: 273, 819
- NTS Map: 21J13 Aroostook
- GNBC Code: DANFW
- Website: perth-andover.com

Perth-Andover is a former village in Victoria County, New Brunswick, Canada. It held village status prior to 2023. It is now part of the village of Southern Victoria.

== History ==
Andover was originally called Little Tobique, the community was given the name Andover, from the town in Hampshire, England. Much of Andover's original land grants were to English soldiers and Loyalist from the American Revolution.

Much of Perth (originally called Larlee) was originally part of the territory of the Tobique First Nation, whose reserve was established in 1801, at the band's request. Due to squatters, the First Nation were forced to surrender a total of 2,539 acres, much in Perth-Andover.

In 1878, the New Brunswick Railway opened its line through the community connecting Fredericton and Edmundston, crossing the river from the east bank at Perth to the west bank at Andover. In 1890, the NBR was leased by the Canadian Pacific Railway (CPR). In 1894, the Tobique Valley Railway constructed a line from a junction with the CPR at Perth to Plaster Rock; it was leased by CPR in 1897.

Until the end of county government in New Brunswick in 1966, Andover was the shire town of Victoria County.

In March 1987, the spring freshet caused several severe ice jams on the Saint John River upstream of the railway bridge in Perth-Andover. On the night of April 1, 1987, an extremely high water level forced residents to evacuate, including a seniors home and the hospital. The morning of April 2, 1987, the Canadian Pacific Railway bridge was demolished by the large ice jam, and many buildings and homes along the river in Perth-Andover were flooded. The destruction of the railway bridge cut off CP Rail's network north of Perth from the railway lines in the southern part of western New Brunswick. This contributed to CP Rail's abandonment of these rural branchlines, which were considered unprofitable by the railway. CP Rail tried to blame NB Power for failing to control water discharges from its hydro-electric dams on the river. By the early 1990s, the railroad had ended railway from the northern end of the Saint John River valley.

In 2009, the Canadian government accepted the Tobique Specific Land Claim of 10,533 acres for negotiation; this relates to the 1892 surrender which the First Nation claims is invalid due to the failure of the government to get approval by Order in Council. Settlement of the claim will result in compensation; existing landowners will not be affected. The governments and the Tobique First Nation have three years to negotiate a settlement.

On March 23, 2012, a high spring freshet coupled with an ice jam caused a rise in water levels surpassing those in the 1987 flood. A mandatory evacuation order was issued. About 500 people were affected.

On 1 January 2023, Perth-Andover amalgamated with the village of Aroostook and parts of two local service districts to form the new village of Southern Victoria. The community's name remains in official use.

== Geography ==
The village is divided by the Saint John River with Perth on the east bank and Andover on the west bank; each was a separate community until municipal amalgamation in 1966. Perth-Andover's population meets the requirements for "town" status under the provincial Municipalities Act; however, it has not applied to change from village designation. It was decided by the council at the time to keep the 'Village ' designation.

== Demographics ==
In the 2021 Census of Population conducted by Statistics Canada, Perth-Andover had a population of 1,574 living in 744 of its 785 total private dwellings, a change of −1% from its 2016 population of 1,590. With a land area of 8.96 km^{2} (3.46 sq mi), it had a population density of 175.7/km^{2} (455.0/sq mi) in 2021.

== Attractions ==
Perth-Andover is host to the annual Gathering of the Scots Festival at Veteran's Field on the last weekend in May and the Larlee Creek Hullabaloo in August, held at Baird's Campground. Other major events in the Village are the Tuff Muck Challenge on the last Saturday in July and the Dam Run marathon on the first Saturday in October. Neat Perth Andover, the Tomlinson Lake Hike to Freedom Trail explores New Brunswick's role in the Underground Railroad for African Americans escaping enslavement who crossed the border from the Maple Grove Friends Church near Fort Fairfield, Maine.

== Infrastructure ==
Perth-Andover Electric Light Commission (PAELC) is one of three municipal power utilities left in New Brunswick, and the only one completely independent of NB Power. The residents of the municipality pay the lowest power rates in the province.

== Notable people ==
- Matt Andersen - Blues musician
- Larry Kennedy - Canadian politician
- John B. McNair- 23rd Premier of New Brunswick, 1940 to 1952

== See also ==
- List of communities in New Brunswick
