= Tinkler =

Tinkler is a surname. Notable people with the surname include:

- Alf Tinkler (1886–1950), English footballer
- Amy Tinkler (born 1999), British artistic gymnast
- Andrew Tinkler, British business executive
- Cole Tinkler (born 1986), New Zealand footballer
- Eric Tinkler (born 1970), South African soccer player
- Jack Tinkler (fl. 1927), New Zealand footballer
- Jamie Tinkler (born 1981), English singer
- Mark Tinkler (born 1974), English footballer
- Nathan Tinkler (born 1976), Australian mining magnate
- Ray Tinkler (born 1929), English football referee
- Richard Tinkler (born 1975), American artist
- Robert Tinkler, Canadian actor and television actor
- Ronald Tinkler (born 1934), South African water polo player
- Scott Tinkler (born 1965), Australian trumpeter and composer
- Ted Tinkler (1921–2011), English cricketer

== See also ==
- The Tinklers
- Tink (disambiguation), including surname uses
- Tinkle (surname)
- Trinkler
