= Aroostook Valley Country Club =

Golf course on the Canada–US border

Coordinates: 46.800487°N 67.789412°W

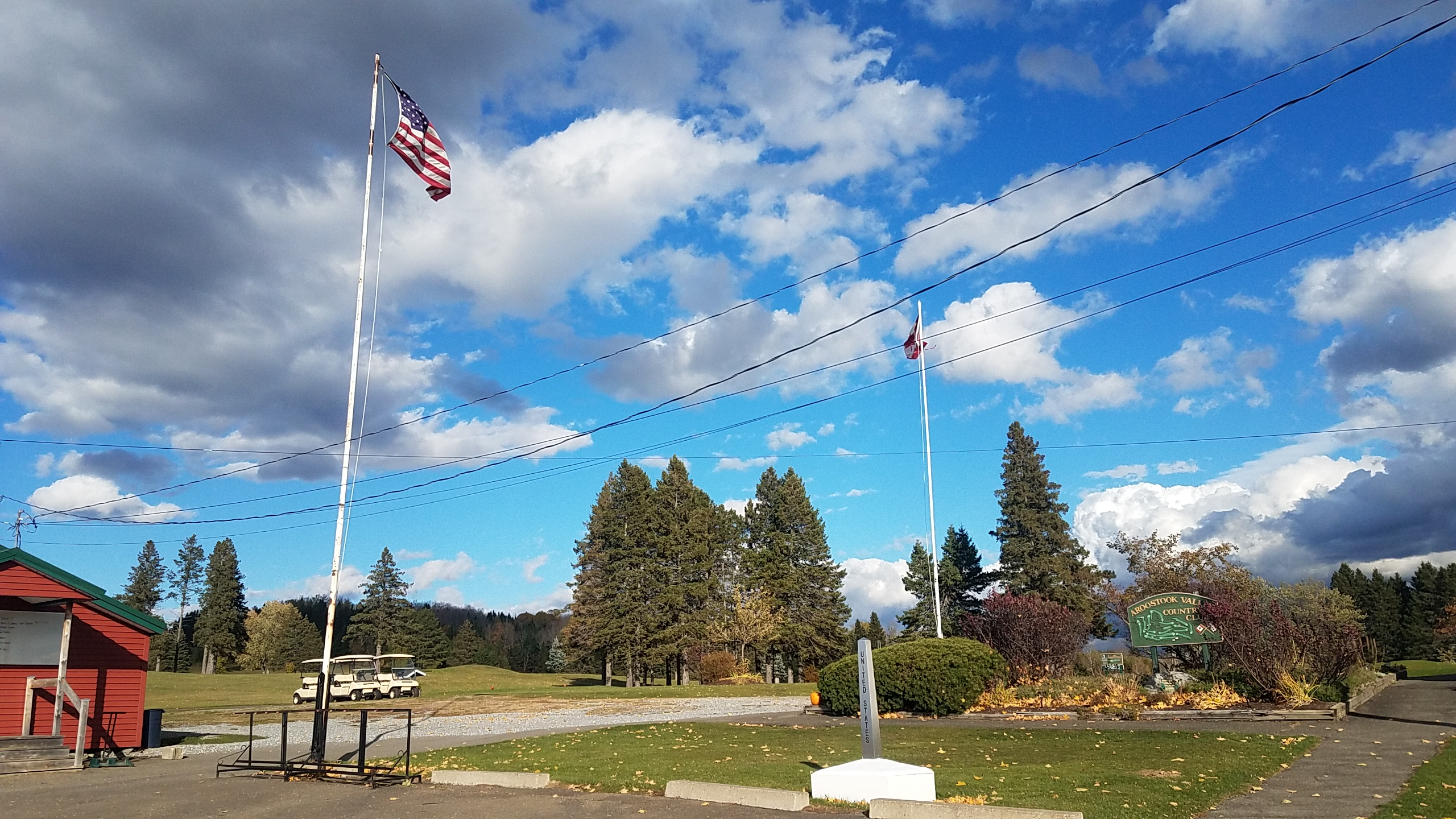
Aroostook Valley Country Club entrance showing US and Canadian flags and border marker

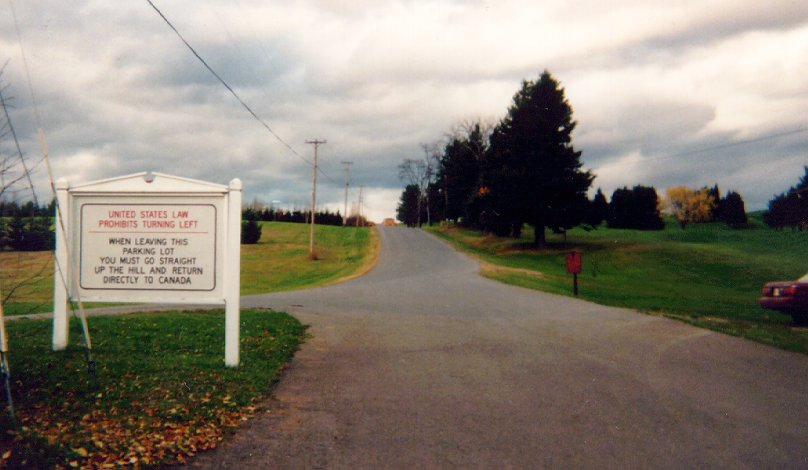
As shown in 1998, this sign directed Canadian golfers to proceed up the hill and return directly to Canada. Currently, the US Border Patrol does not allow Canadian golfers to travel to the course via Brown Road.

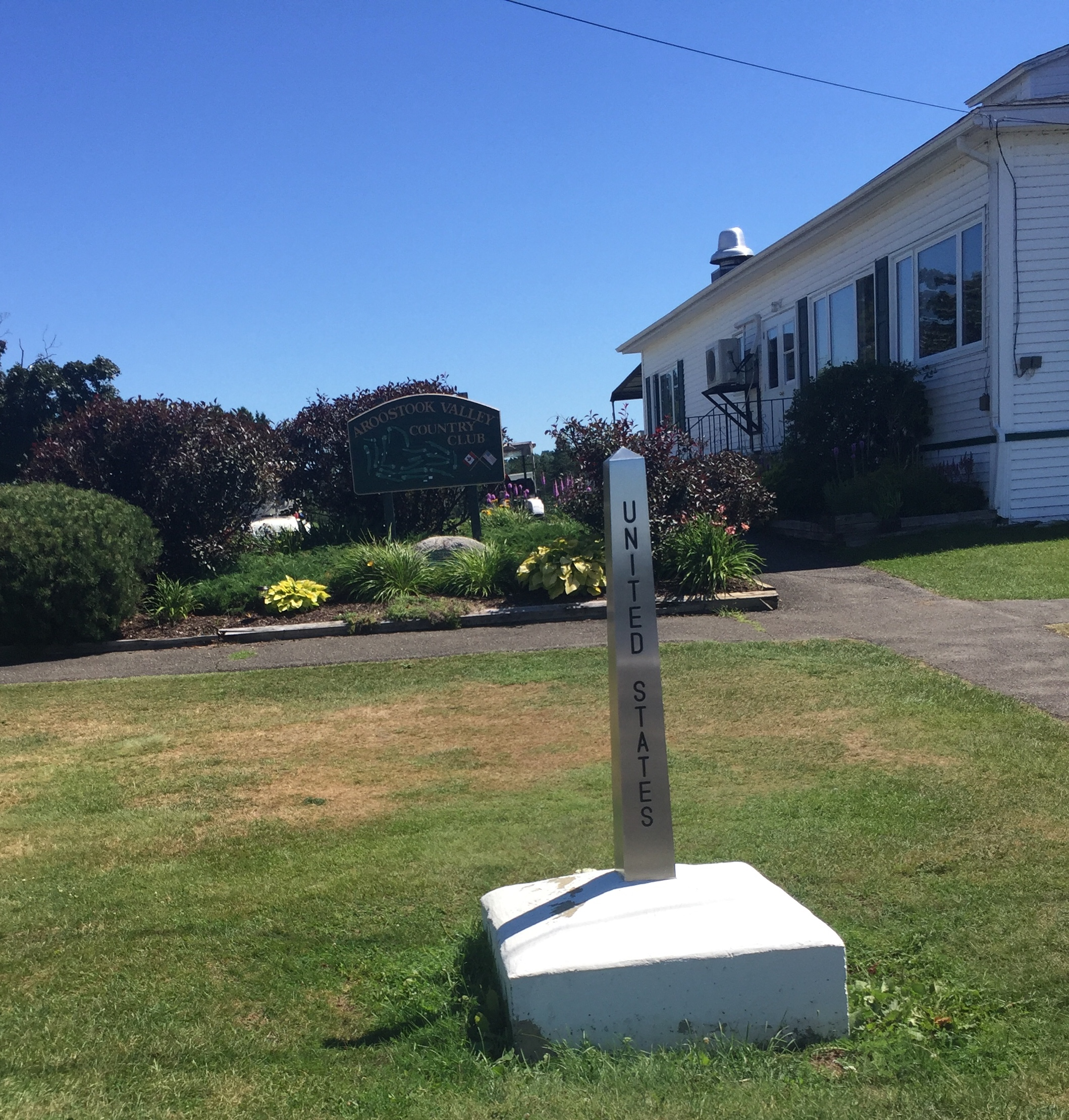
Entrance to the Aroostook Valley Country Club

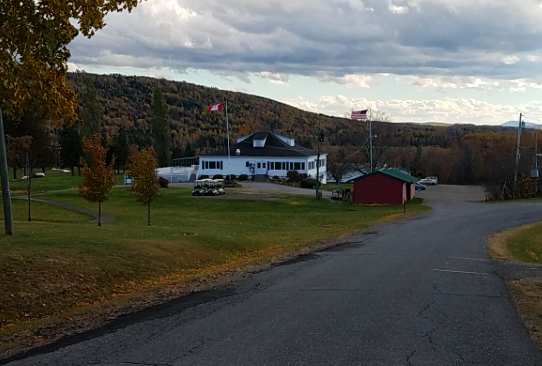
Aroostook Valley Country Club showing US and Canadian flags

The Aroostook Valley Country Club is a golf course that straddles the Canada–US border, between the U.S. state of Maine and the Canadian province of New Brunswick. The club, located near Southern Victoria, New Brunswick and Fort Fairfield, Maine, has its course (except part of the tee area for the ninth hole, and possibly part of a sand trap on the first hole) and clubhouse on the Canadian side of the border. Its parking lot and pro shop are on the American side. Although the course is located entirely on one side of the border, three holes are close enough to the border that crooked shots can enter the United States. The club was founded in 1929; its position on the border allowed American golfers to bypass Prohibition without passing through customs. Club membership was previously roughly half Canadian and half American. With tougher access requirements since the height of the pandemic, American membership has fallen by close to 70%.

== Pre–COVID-19 pandemic access ==
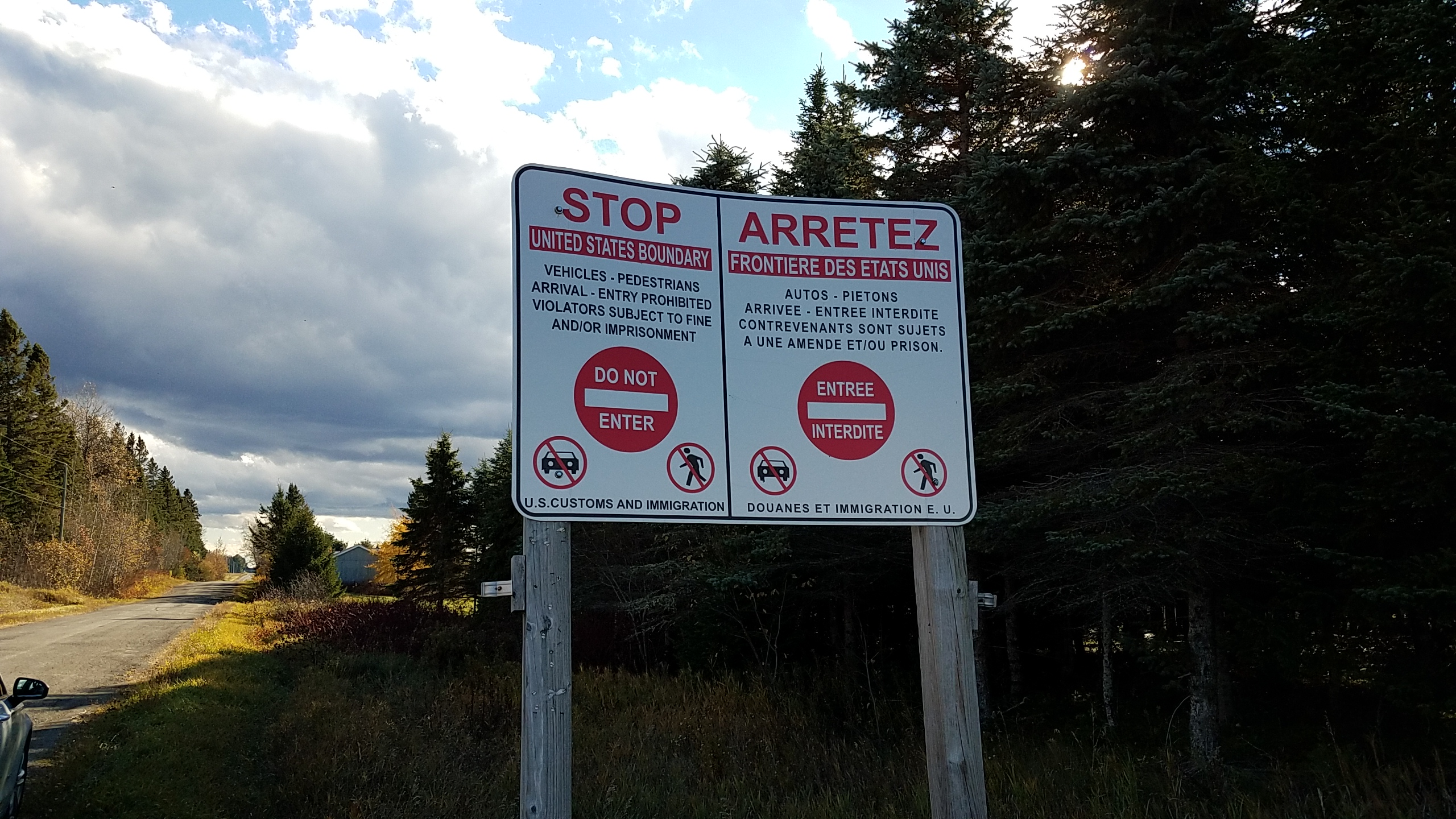
Border sign on Russell Road at entrance from Brown Road

Prior to the COVID-19 pandemic, the only entry to the course was on the American side of the border; American golfers could use the entire club without reporting to a Port of Entry. Canadian golfers used a small local road, Brown Road, to cross the border and access the country club. Canada had a seasonal border checkpoint on the road but until 2008, entry to the U.S. had been unsecured since the 1950s. In 2008, however, the U.S. border officials closed the unpatrolled border crossing on Brown Road, citing increased concerns over terrorism and a drug sale on the course in 2006. The closure required Canadian golfers to make a 33-kilometre (21 mi) detour through Fort Fairfield to access the course and was criticized by the Fort Fairfield town manager and the country club's golf pro. U.S. Senator Susan Collins and Canadian MP Mike Allen proposed that U.S. border officials establish a new seasonal border checkpoint on Brown Road. Up to 2019, the Four Falls Border Crossing was a seasonally open border checkpoint along Brown Road on the Canadian side.

== Access during COVID-19 pandemic ==
During the COVID-19 pandemic of 2020–21, the USA-Canada border was effectively closed. Canadian traffic to the golf club was diverted away from the US by crossing from Brown Road southbound onto private land to reach the parking lot, then operating golf carts beside Russell Road (but not on it, as the road is in the US) to reach the course. Americans could not access the golf club.

== Access post–COVID-19 pandemic ==
Since the COVID-19 pandemic, US and Canadian authorities have strictly enforced access to the club. People coming from Canada continue to use the route opened during the pandemic. Golfers from the USA wanting to use the club are required to officially enter at a border crossing (the closest is at Carlingford, opposite the US Customs Fort Fairfield Post) and then access the course the same way as for people coming from Canada. They must also do the reverse to return to the USA.

Since 2025, a strip of land alongside Russell Road has been donated by a local resident so golfers may shuttle in on golf carts along the new trail.

== Scorecard ==
Aroostook Valley Country Club (distances in yards)
Tee	Rating/Slope	1	2	3	4	5	6	7	8	9	Out	10	11	12	13	14	15	16	17	18	In	Total
Blue	69.1 / 122	388	341	494	170	471	336	352	150	378	3080	395	342	510	202	530	180	402	149	514	3224	6304
White	67.4 / 118	375	327	478	152	440	308	334	139	365	2918	382	322	489	189	510	156	383	134	494	3059	5977
Par		4	4	5	3	5	4	4	3	4	36	4	4	5	3	5	3	4	3	5	36	72
Ladies'	70.0 / 119	351	277	458	130	397	278	257	108	356	2612	370	314	393	183	467	105	358	122	469	2781	5393

== See also ==
- Four Falls Border Crossing
