= Diasporus tinker =

Conservation status
- Least Concern (IUCN 3.1)

Scientific classification
- Kingdom: Animalia
- Phylum: Chordata
- Class: Amphibia
- Order: Anura
- Family: Eleutherodactylidae
- Genus: Diasporus
- Species: D. tinker

Binomial name
- Diasporus tinker (Lynch, 2001)

Synonyms
- Eleutherodactylus tinker Lynch, 2001; Pristimantis tinker (Lynch, 2001)

Species of amphibian

Diasporus tinker is a species of frogs in the family Eleutherodactylidae. It is endemic to Colombia where it is known from scattered localities between the southern Córdoba Department in the north through Antioquia and Chocó Departments to the Valle del Cauca Department in the south. The specific name tinker refers to the "tink"-like advertisement call.

== Description ==
Adult males measure 15–20 mm (0.6–0.8 in) and adult females 19–22 mm (0.7–0.9 in) in snout–vent length. The head is as wide as it is long and as wide as the body. The snout is acuminate in dorsal view and almost protruding in lateral view. The tympanum has its upper edge hidden by the diffuse supra-tympanic fold. The fingers have fleshy lateral keels and narrow discs. The toes are basally webbed and have expanded discs. Skin is smooth except for some low, flattened warts, especially on the upper flanks. The dorsum is brown with a tan inter-orbital bar and dorso-lateral stripes. The ventral surfaces are dirty white with brown marbling or dark brown with white flecks. Males have a pale brown vocal sac. The iris is pale brown and has golden flecks, black or brown reticulations, and a black or brown horizontal stripe.

The male advertisement call is a "tink", consisting of a single peaked note lasting about 0.05 seconds and produced at a rate of 11.3 calls/minute. The call has two harmonics.

== Habitat and conservation ==
Diasporus tinker is a common species found in leaf-litter and on epiphytes and bushes in a variety of habitats—primary and secondary forests and even banana plantations. It occurs to at least 1,880 m (6,170 ft) above sea level. No major threats to this species have been identified, and it occurs in several protected areas.
