= Victoria South =

Victoria South could refer to:

- Victoria South (federal electoral district)
- Victoria South (provincial electoral district)

== See also ==
- South Victoria (disambiguation)
