= Maine school administrative district 20 =

School district in Maine, United States

Maine school administrative district 20 or Msad 20 is the local Middle/High school for the town of Fort Fairfield Maine

As of 2022 the Schools had dangerous levels of lead in some of the drinking water

The schools students are mostly white with 92.6 Percent of the students, the total funds are eight and a half million per year, and has a 10:1 Student teacher ratio, and 48.6 percent of students are economically disadvantaged.

== Merger Plan ==
Because of low high school enrollment planning has started for merging Presque isle, Caribou, and Fort Fairfield High Schools.

the superintendent of the Presque Isle district stated that the reasoning for this proposal was because of aging infrastructure and the declining student body. Each school applied for the Integrated Consolidated 9-16 Educational Facilities grant through the Maine Department of Education. It is a program to merge local high schools. Mr. Greenlaw (Presque Isle Superintendent) has stated that they are yet to decide where the school will be.

== Lead Contamination in Water ==
The FFMHS did lead water testing 2022. The highest lead levels were found in the kitchen at 48.8 parts per billion. 48.8 parts per billion is often considered dangerous and harmful. The source of the lead is unknown but is likely coming from lead soldering used in the pipes. The school has disabled many of the water fixtures that had the highest levels of lead, many being by gyms and locker rooms.
