= Tink =

Tink may refer to:

== People ==
- Andrew Tink (born 1953), Australian politician in the New South Wales Legislative Assembly 1988–2007
- Kylea Tink, (born 1970), Australian politician in the federal House of Representatives 2022–present
- Rowan Tink AM (born 1955), Australian Special Air Service officer
- Tink Riviere (1899–1965), American Major League Baseball pitcher
- Tink Turner (1890–1962), American Major League Baseball pitcher
- Tink (musician), (born 1995), American rapper and singer-songwriter
- Josiah "Tink" Thompson, American writer, retired professional private investigator, and former philosophy professor

== Places ==
- Tink, Iran

== Arts and entertainment ==
- Tink of S.E., a 1987 album by Washington, D.C. indie band Unrest

== Natural world ==
- Common tink frog, a species of frog in the family Leptodactylidae; the male makes a loud metallic "tink" sound during the night
- Tink-tink cisticola, a species of bird in the family Cisticolidae, found in Angola, Eswatini, Lesotho, Mozambique, South Africa, and Zambia

== See also ==
- Tinker (disambiguation)
- Tinkle (surname)
- Tinks Pottinger (born 1956), New Zealand Olympic horsewoman
