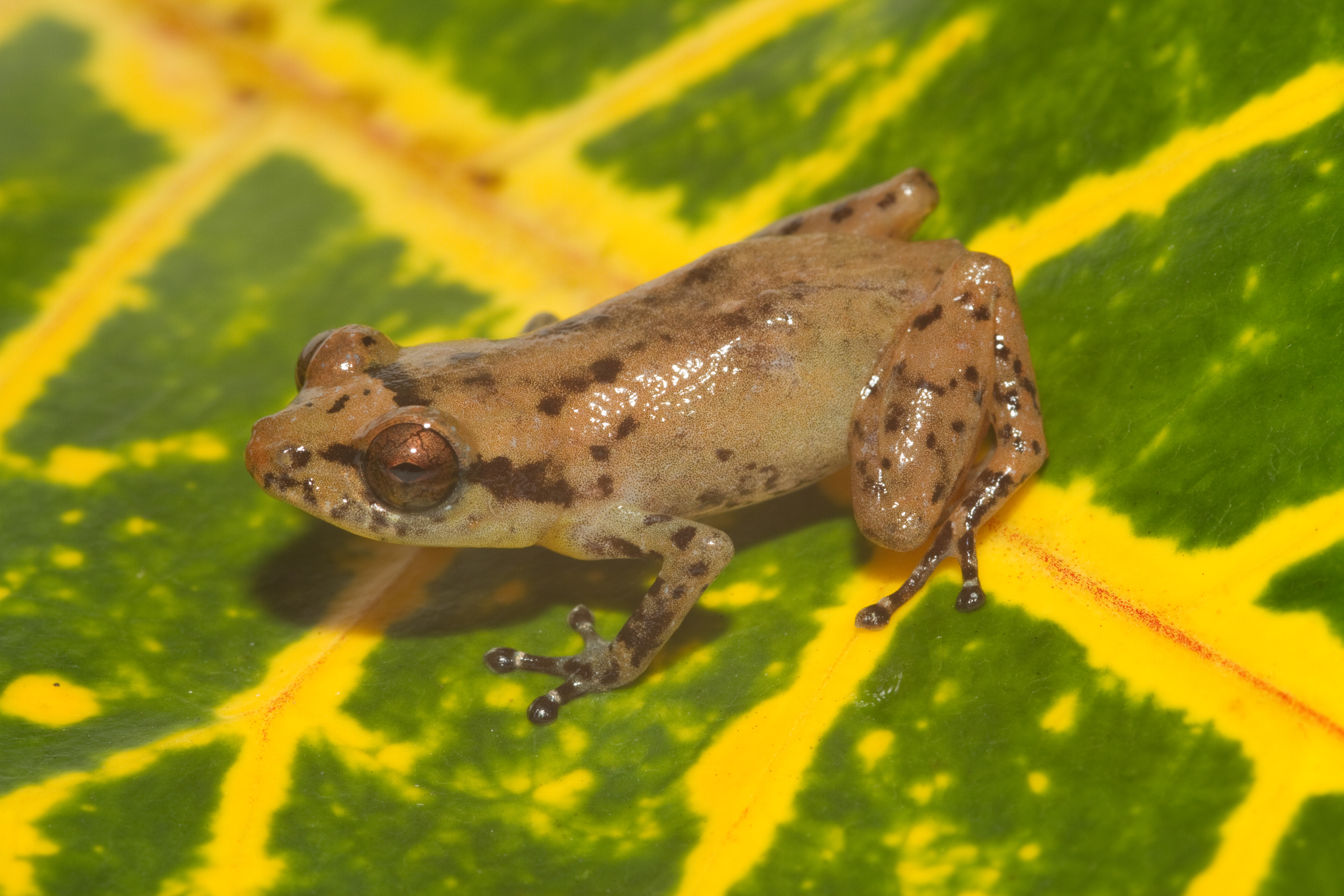
- Diasporus diastema

Scientific classification
- Kingdom: Animalia
- Phylum: Chordata
- Class: Amphibia
- Order: Anura
- Clade: Brachycephaloidea
- Family: Eleutherodactylidae
- Subfamily: Eleutherodactylinae
- Genus: Diasporus; Hedges, Duellman, and Heinicke, 2008

Type species
- Lithodytes diastema Cope, 1875

Species
- See text

= Diasporus =

Genus of frogs

Diasporus is a genus of frogs in the family Eleutherodactylidae. The genus was first described in 2008. They are found in Central and northern South America. They are sometimes referred to as dink frogs, in reference to the "tink" sound that males make during the mating season.

== Characteristics ==
Diasporus are small frogs, with a snout–vent length varying between 11 mm (0.43 in) in male Diasporus quidditus to 26 mm (1.0 in) in female Diasporus hylaeformis. They have a relatively large, distinct head. All members have direct development, skipping a tadpole stage. The male advertisement call is either a "whistle" or a "tink" (or "dink"), depending on the species.

== Etymology ==
The name is from the Greek diaspora ("a dispersion from"). It refers to the relationship of this genus to the Caribbean clade of Eleutherodactylus.

== Distribution ==
Diasporus spp. inhabit humid lowland and montane forests from eastern Honduras through Panama to the Pacific versant of Colombia and northwestern Ecuador.

== Species ==
The following species are recognised in the genus Diasporus:

- Diasporus amirae Arias, Chaves, Salazar, Salazar-Zúñiga, and García-Rodríguez, 2019
- Diasporus anthrax (Lynch, 2001)
- Diasporus citrinobapheus Hertz, Hauenschild, Lotzkat, and Köhler, 2012
- Diasporus darienensis Batista, Köhler, Mebert, Hertz, and Vesely, 2016
- Diasporus diastema (Cope, 1875)
- Diasporus gularis (Boulenger, 1898)
- Diasporus hylaeformis (Cope, 1875)
- Diasporus igneus Batista, Ponce, and Hertz, 2012
- Diasporus majeensis Batista, Köhler, Mebert, Hertz, and Vesely, 2016
- Diasporus pequeno Batista, Köhler, Mebert, Hertz, and Vesely, 2016
- Diasporus quidditus (Lynch, 2001)
- Diasporus sapo Batista, Köhler, Mebert, Hertz, and Vesely, 2016
- Diasporus tigrillo (Savage, 1997)
- Diasporus tinker (Lynch, 2001)
- Diasporus ventrimaculatus Chaves, García-Rodríguez, Mora, and Leal, 2009
- Diasporus vocator (Taylor, 1955)
