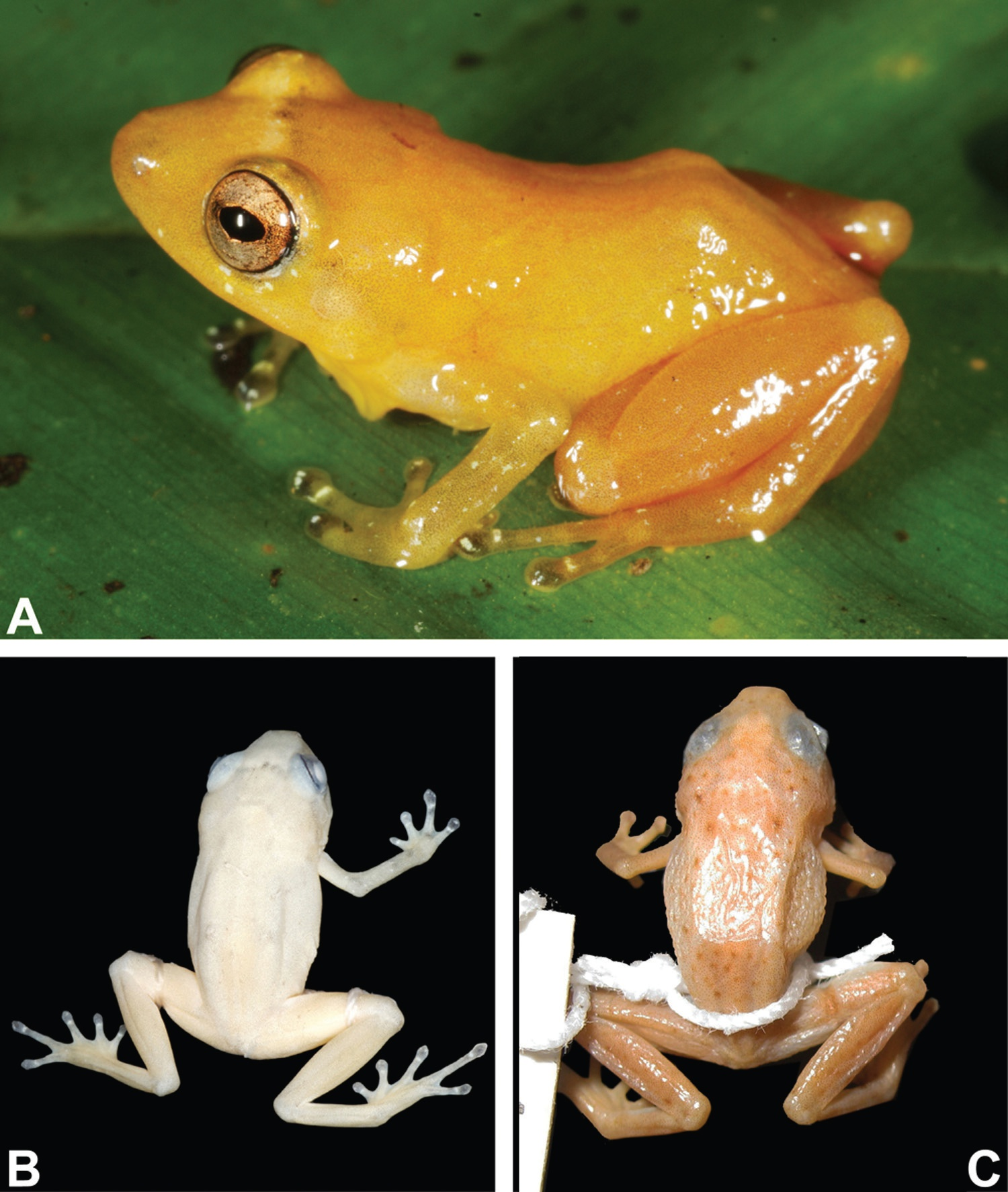
- Diasporus citrinobapheus

Conservation status
- Near Threatened (IUCN 3.1)

Scientific classification
- Kingdom: Animalia
- Phylum: Chordata
- Class: Amphibia
- Order: Anura
- Family: Eleutherodactylidae
- Genus: Diasporus
- Species: D. tigrillo

Binomial name
- Diasporus tigrillo (Savage, 1997)

Synonyms
- Eleutherodactylus tigrillo Savage, 1997; Pristimantis tigrillo (Savage, 1997)

= Diasporus tigrillo =

Species of frog

Diasporus tigrillo is a species of frog in the family Eleutherodactylidae. It is endemic to the valley of the Rio Larí in Limón Province, Costa Rica.

== Description ==
Adult males measure 17–19 mm (0.67–0.75 in) in snout–vent length. The head is as long as it is wide. The snout is subovoid in dorsal view and rounded in lateral view. The tympanum is distinct. The fingers and toes have expanded disks but lack lateral fringes and webbing. The dorsum has low pustules whereas the venter is shagreen. The upper surfaces of the body are light yellow with dark dots, sometimes forming blotches by aggregation. The venter is white and the throat is cream. The upper surfaces of thighs are pinkish orange and have dark dots, while the lower surface of thighs are uniformly pinkish orange. Males have single external vocal sac and vocal slit.

== Habitat and conservation ==
This little known species occurs in premontane rainforest at elevations of 273–440 m (896–1,444 ft) above sea level. Males call from late evening to night from secondary vegetation along the river, such as shrubs, wildcane, ferns, and many thorny plants.

There is little habitat loss occurring in the area. Chytridiomycosis is a potential threat.
