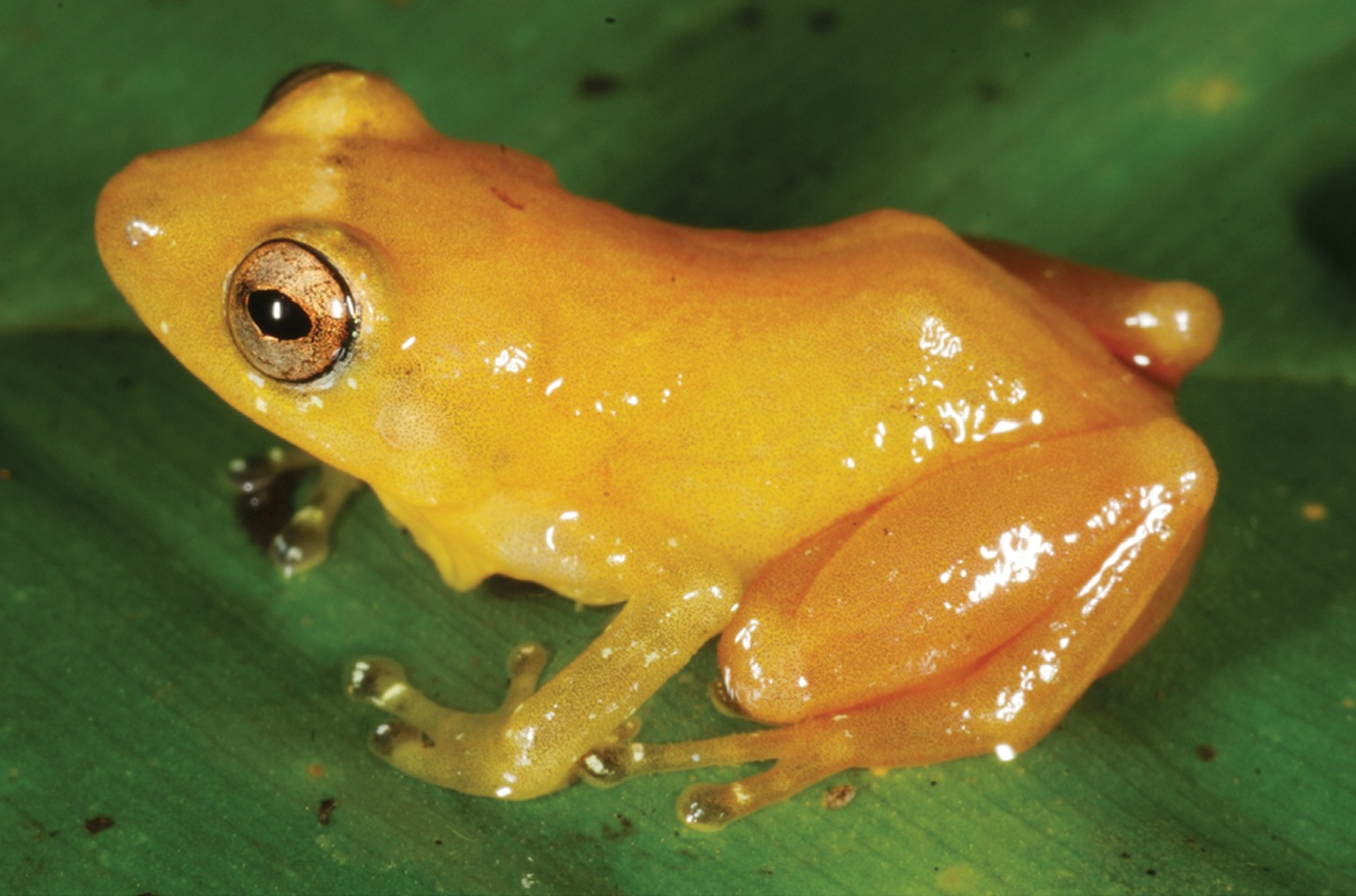
- Diasporus citrinobapheus male holotype

Conservation status
- Least Concern (IUCN 3.1)

Scientific classification
- Kingdom: Animalia
- Phylum: Chordata
- Class: Amphibia
- Order: Anura
- Family: Eleutherodactylidae
- Genus: Diasporus
- Species: D. citrinobapheus

Binomial name
- Diasporus citrinobapheus Hertz et al., 2012

= Diasporus citrinobapheus =

Yellow dyer rainfrog

Species of frog

Diasporus citrinobapheus, the yellow dink frog or yellow dyer rainfrog, is a species of frog native to the Cordillera de Talamanca of western Panama. Adult males have snout–vent lengths of 17.3–19.7 mm (0.68–0.78 in) and adult females have one of 21.8 mm (0.86 in). The frog is almost entirely bright yellow and orange dorsally, with a colorless and mostly transparent underside. Males have yellow vocal sacs.

== Taxonomy ==
Diasporus citrinobapheus was formally described in 2012 based on an adult male specimen collected from Comarca Ngöbe-Buglé in Panama. The specific name citrinobapheus is derived from the Greek citrinos (citrin-yellow) and bapheus (dyer) referring to the yellow body color, which dyes one's fingers yellowish when the frog is handled. This species has the English common names yellow dink frog and yellow dyer rainfrog, as well as the Spanish common name Martillito Amarillo.

Diasporus citrinobapheus is most closely related to D. tigrillo.

== Description ==
Adult males have snout–vent lengths of 17.3–19.7 mm (0.68–0.78 in) and adult females have one of 21.8 mm (0.86 in). The frog is almost entirely bright yellow and orange dorsally, with some individuals have dark grayish or whitish-grayish spots. The underside largely lacks pigments and is almost transparent, excepting the yellow male vocal sac. Diasporus citrinobapheus' unique yellow-orange coloration separates it from all other Central American species in its genus, except D. tigrillo.

== Distribution and habitat ==
Diasporus citrinobapheus is endemic to Panama. It inhabits the Caribbean slopes of the western Serranía de Tabasará and both the Pacific and Caribbean slopes of the eastern Serranía de Tabasará. It is a denizen of mature forest, secondary growth, and plantations, but avoids open habitats like grasslands.

== Conservation ==
Diasporus citrinobapheus is classified as being of least concern and is thought to have a stable population.
