= USS Aroostook =

USS Aroostook has been the name of three ships of the United States Navy.

- USS Aroostook (1861), was a wooden-hulled, steam-propelled, screw gunboat.
- USS Aroostook (CM-3), was a minelayer, which served from 1917 until 1931.
- USS Aroostook (AOG-14), was a gasoline tanker which served from 1943 until 1945.
