= Diasporus hylaeformis =

Conservation status
- Least Concern (IUCN 3.1)

Scientific classification
- Kingdom: Animalia
- Phylum: Chordata
- Class: Amphibia
- Order: Anura
- Family: Eleutherodactylidae
- Genus: Diasporus
- Species: D. hylaeformis

Binomial name
- Diasporus hylaeformis (Cope, 1875)

Synonyms
- Eleutherodactylus hylaeformis (Cope, 1875)

Species of frog

Diasporus hylaeformis, also known as the Pico Blanco robber frog or the montane dink frog, is a species of frog in the family Eleutherodactylidae. It is found in humid mountain areas in Costa Rica and Panama. Its natural habitats are dense montane forest and tropical rainforest. It is an abundant, nocturnal species found in low vegetation.

At 26 mm (1.0 in) snout–vent length, female Diasporus hylaeformis are the largest frogs in the genus Diasporus.
