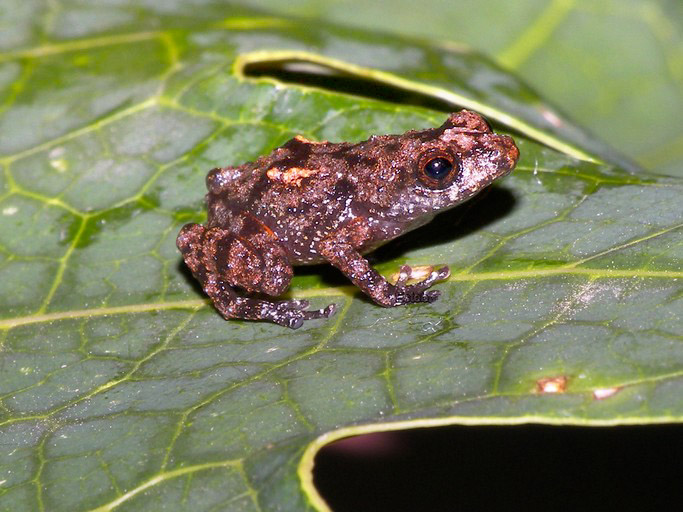

Conservation status
- Vulnerable (IUCN 3.1)

Scientific classification
- Kingdom: Animalia
- Phylum: Chordata
- Class: Amphibia
- Order: Anura
- Clade: Brachycephaloidea
- Family: Eleutherodactylidae
- Genus: Diasporus
- Species: D. anthrax

Binomial name
- Diasporus anthrax (Lynch, 2001)

Synonyms
- Eleutherodactylus anthrax Lynch, 2001

= Diasporus anthrax =

Species of amphibian

Diasporus anthrax is a species of frogs in the family Eleutherodactylidae. It is endemic to Colombia where it is found along the eastern base of the Cordillera Central and the western slope of the Cordillera Oriental. The specific name anthrax is Greek for Greek, meaning a carbuncle, a red gemstone. It refers to the red patches on the hidden surfaces of the limbs.

== Description ==
Diasporus anthrax are small frogs, with a body size of 14–19 mm (0.55–0.75 in). It is easily distinguished from related species by its white belly with dark spots and red spots on the hidden surface of the extremities.

The male advertisement call is distinctive and consists of a single note about 0.06 seconds in duration. Its dominant frequency is about 4400 Hz, higher than advertisement calls of other Diasporus species.

== Habitat ==
It inhabits humid tropical and sub-Andean forest at elevations of 280–1,200 m (920–3,940 ft) above sea level. They seem to occur near water bodies and human settlements. Specimens have been found on a tree branch, on a trail, in a trashcan, and inside of a petiole of Xanthosoma sagittifolium. Although these frogs appear rare based on museum collections and sightings during field expeditions, acoustic surveys suggest that they can be fairly abundant inside forest patches.
