= Diasporus pequeno =

Little Dink

Conservation status
- Critically Endangered (IUCN 3.1)

Scientific classification
- Kingdom: Animalia
- Phylum: Chordata
- Class: Amphibia
- Order: Anura
- Clade: Brachycephaloidea
- Family: Eleutherodactylidae
- Subfamily: Eleutherodactylinae
- Genus: Diasporus
- Species: D. pequeno

Binomial name
- Diasporus pequeno Batista, Köhler, Mebert, Hertz, and Vesely, 2016

Species of frog

Diasporus pequeno, commonly referred to as the little dink frog, is a newly discovered frog in the genus Diasporus. The Little dink frog was discovered by Abel Batista, Gunther Köhler, Konran Member, Andreas Hertz, and Milan Vesely and a report of their discovery was published in their 2016 study on the richness of the Diasporus species in Eastern Panama.

== Etymology ==
The first specimens of Diasporus pequeno were found near the Panamanian village of Bajo Pequeno, so when selecting the name of the species, Batista and his team decided to name the frog after the local village. The scientific name has nothing to do with the size of the frog.

Its common name, Little dink frog or Little dink, is derived from the English definition of the word pequeno, which in Spanish means small, or little.

== Description ==
Little dink frogs are either walnut brown with sky blue spots on its dorsum or cream with dark brown reticulation. Regardless of coloring, they have a transparent ventral side. and no fringes or webbing on their fingers or toes, nor do they have a tympanic membrane. The flanks of both morphs are a bright red color and their dorsal and ventral skin is smooth. Males are more colorful than their female counterparts as they have a yellow vocal sac.

As far as is understood, there is no reasoning for any differentiation in coloring, nor is there any reasoning for the differences in patterns.

These frogs typically have a snout vent length of 16.9 to 24.8 mm (0.67 to 0.98 in) Their heads are approximately 5.9 mm to 9.1 mm in length, measuring from the back of the jaw to the tip of the snout, and 6.2 mm to 8.9 mm in width, measuring from either side of the jaw.

The heads of frogs in the genus Diasporus are distinct from the rest of their body. Their heads may be anywhere from 32% to 41% wider than their snout vent length. They also do not have a cranial crest. Diasporus pequeno are direct development frogs, meaning there is no tadpole stage, a trait specific to the Family Eleutherodactylidae.

== Behavior ==
Frogs in the genus Diasporus have calls be described as "tink"s or whistles. The advertisement call of Diasporus pequeno has short monophasic notes that last for 0.09s to 0.15s in 3.51s to 6.85s intervals. These calls are released at a dominant frequency of 3.44 kHz to 3.48 kHz. They release these calls at a rate of 11.61 calls per minute.

Not much else is known about behaviors of Diasporus pequeno.

== Habitat ==
Little dink frogs can be found in the humid tropical rain forests of Eastern Panama near the Darién mountain range. They prefer to be above ground, by approximately 0.2 to 1 metre (1 to 3 ft), on branches and in bromeliads.

They were originally found near the village Bajo Pequeno, and it is currently unknown what their range is. However, they have an estimated extent of occurrence of 10 square kilometres (3.9 sq mi)

Conservation efforts for the little dink frog are limited due to a lack of research and understanding of them, but it is generally believed that their limited numbers are dwindling due to the destruction of habitat. The main threats include logging, gold mining, and the spread of agricultural fields. Invasive species that out-compete the native Diasporus pequeno species, and various diseases contribute to the decline of Little dink frog populations.
