= Maple Grove Friends Church =

Historic church in Maine, United States

- U.S. National Register of Historic Places
- Location within Maine Location within the United States
- Nearest city: Maple Grove, Maine
- Coordinates: 46°42′21″N 67°52′13″W
- Area: less than one acre
- Built: 1863
- Architectural style: Mid 19th Century Revival, Late Victorian
- NRHP reference No.: 00000764
- Added to NRHP: July 05, 2000

The Maple Grove Friends Church is a historic Quaker meeting house on U.S. Route 1A in the Maple Grove village of southern Fort Fairfield, Maine. Built in 1863 and renovated in 1906, it is believed to be the oldest ecclesiastical building in the Fort Fairfield area and the northernmost station on the Underground Railroad. It was listed on the National Register of Historic Places in 2000.

== Description and history ==
The Maple Grove Friends Church is set on the west side of United States Route 1A in southern Fort Fairfield, a short way north of its junction with Up Country Road. It is a modest single-story wood frame structure, with clapboard siding, stone foundation, front-gable roof, and a three-stage square tower at its northeast corner. The east-facing front is dominated by a large stained-glass window and the tower, whose lower stage houses the main entrance, sheltered by a gabled hood with Italianate bracketing. The middle stage of the tower is shingled, and the upper stage has an open belfry with round-arch openings; the tower is topped by a pyramidal roof. The interior of the church is divided into the main sanctuary, which takes up two-thirds of the space, with the vestry facilities taking up the rest. The sanctuary is lined with oak pews, and there is a raised platform at the southwest corner, with a lectern. The ceiling and upper part of the walls are finished in metal paneling.

A number of Quaker families moved to the Fort Fairfield area beginning in 1859, soon bringing interest for the construction of a meeting house. When built in 1863, this building was a simple structure, lacking both the tower and the stained-glass window. In 1906 the building underwent renovation, at which time the tower and window were added; the latter was dedicated to William Penn Varney and Lydia Cook Varney, longtime leaders of the meeting. The church was opened to other religious denominations in the early decades of the 20th century, but was closed due to declining enrollments sometime after World War II. By 1972 the building had been purchased by an Orthodox Presbyterian congregation. It was given to Frontier Heritage, a local historical society, in 1995, and rededicated as a Quaker meeting house in 2000.

The church is believed to have served as a station on the Underground Railroad for African Americans escaping enslavement and the fugitive slave laws, based on oral history of Quaker families who were part of the congregation. The church floor shows evidence of a hiding place and a concealed hatch. The most northernmost station on the Underground Railroad, the church allowed escaping slaves to rest and hide before following nearby Tomlinson Brook which led across the border to Tomlinson Lake near Perth-Andover in New Brunswick, Canada where a free Black family would assist them in finding new homes in Canada.

== See also ==
- National Register of Historic Places listings in Aroostook County, Maine
