= Diasporus ventrimaculatus =

Conservation status
- Least Concern (IUCN 3.1)

Scientific classification
- Kingdom: Animalia
- Phylum: Chordata
- Class: Amphibia
- Order: Anura
- Family: Eleutherodactylidae
- Genus: Diasporus
- Species: D. ventrimaculatus

Binomial name
- Diasporus ventrimaculatus (Chaves et al, 2009)

Species of amphibian

Diasporus ventrimaculatus is a species of dink frogs, in the genus Diasporus. It was originally described as Diasporus ventrimaculatus sp. nov. in Zootaxa in 2009.
