= Tinker (surname) =

Surname list

The surname Tinker, originally an occupational surname for a "mender of pots and pans", may refer to:

People:

- Annie Rensselaer Tinker (1884–1924), American volunteer nurse in WWI, suffragist, and philanthropist
- Bonnie Tinker (1948–2009), American activist
- Carson Tinker (born 1989), American National Football League long snapper
- Clarence L. Tinker (1887–1942), first Native American major general
- Frank Glasgow Tinker (1909–1939), American mercenary pilot and top American ace in the Spanish Civil War
- Grant Tinker (1925–2016), former chairman and CEO of the NBC television network, co-founder of MTM Enterprises
- Gerald Tinker (born 1951), American former track and field runner and National Football League player
- HP Tinker (born 1969), British short story writer
- Irene Tinker (born 1927), American Professor Emerita at the University of California, Berkeley
- Jack Tinker (1938–1996), English theatre critic
- Joe Tinker (1880–1948), American Hall-of-Fame Major League Baseball player
- John Tinker (disambiguation)
- Mark Tinker (born 1951), American television producer and director
- Miles Tinker (1893–1977), American author and professor emeritus at the University of Minnesota
- Ronald Tinker (1913–1982), New Zealand World War II officer
- Thomas Tinker (c.1581–1620/21), a passenger on the Mayflower

Fictional characters:

- Beth Tinker, a character in the British soap opera Coronation Street
- Sinead Tinker, the niece of Beth Tinker in Coronation Street
- Alice Tinker, a character in British sitcom The Vicar of Dibley
