= Tinkers Creek =

Tinkers Creek or Tinker's Creek may refer to:

== Bridge ==
- Tinkers Creek Aqueduct bridging the Ohio and Erie Canal over Tinkers Creek in Ohio

== Stream ==
- Idaho

- Big Tinker Creek in Idaho County
- Little Tinker Creek in Idaho County

- Kentucky

- Left Fork Tinker Fork in Floyd County
- Right Fork Tinker Fork in Floyd County
- Tinker Fork in Floyd County
- Tinker Run in Hardin County

- Maine

- Tinker Brook in Hancock County

- Maryland

- Tinkers Creek in Prince George's County

- Massachusetts

- Tinkerville Brook in Worcester County

- New Hampshire

- Tinker Brook in Coos County

- New Jersey

- Tinkers Branch in Camden County

- North Carolina

- Tinkers Creek in Davidson County

- Ohio

- Tinker Creek in Trumbull County
- Tinkers Creek (Cuyahoga River) in Cuyahoga, Summit, and Portage counties

- Oklahoma

- Tinker Creek in Oklahoma County

- Oregon

- Tinker Creek in Grant County

- Pennsylvania

- Tinker Creek in Susquehanna County
- Tinker Run in Clearfield County
- Tinkers Run in Westmoreland County
- Tinkertown Run in McKean County

- Rhode Island

- Tinkerville Brook in Providence County

- South Carolina

- Tinker Creek in Aiken County
- Tinker Creek in Union County
- Tinkers Creek in Chester County

- Tennessee

- Tinker Branch in Cocke County
- Tinker Branch in Polk County

- Vermont

- Tinker Brook in Windsor County

- Virginia

- Tinker Creek in Roanoke County

== See also ==
- Pilgrim at Tinker Creek, a 1974 nonfiction book by Annie Dillard
- Tinker (disambiguation)
