= Nikolai Trinkler =

Russian Empire and Soviet Ukrainian surgeon (1859–1925)

- Николай Петрович Тринклер; Микола Петрович Трінклер
- Trinkler in about 1900
- Born: 19 November 1859; Saint Petersburg, Russian Empire
- Died: 10 August 1925 (aged 65); Yevpatoria, Crimea, Soviet Union
- Resting place: Second City Cemetery, Kharkiv
- Alma mater: Kharkov University (1884)
- Known for: Early total gastrectomy in the Russian Empire; description of visceral syphilis; ventricular drainage for hydrocephalus
- Awards: Order of St. Anna, 3rd class (1910); Honoured Professor (1924)
- Scientific career
- Fields: Surgery
- Workplaces: Imperial Kharkov University; Kharkov Medical Institute
- Thesis: On the surgery of transverse fractures of the patella (1899)
- Doctoral advisor: Wilhelm Grube

Nikolai Petrovich Trinkler (Russian: Николай Петрович Тринклер; Ukrainian: Микола Петрович Трінклер, romanized: Mykola Petrovych Trinkler; 19 November 1859 – 10 August 1925) was a Russian and Soviet Ukrainian surgeon and professor at Kharkov University and the Kharkov Medical Institute (now Kharkiv National Medical University). One of the most prominent surgeons of the late Russian Empire, he performed the second total gastrectomy in the country, developed an original method of draining the lateral ventricle in hydrocephalus, and was among the first to describe visceral syphilis in the medical literature. A street in Kharkiv is named after him.

== Early life and education ==
Trinkler was born on 19 November 1859 in Saint Petersburg into a merchant family. He received his early education at a private German school and graduated with a gold medal from the Simferopol boys' gymnasium in 1877. He was a cousin of the engineer Gustav Trinkler.

In 1878 he entered the medical faculty of Kharkov University. While still in his fourth year he was placed in charge of the laboratory of the faculty surgical clinic headed by the surgeon Wilhelm Grube, who became his mentor. He graduated with distinction in 1884.

== Career ==
Trinkler, c. 1900

From 1885 Trinkler worked as a resident (ordinator) in the university surgical clinic under Grube, and from 1888 to 1892 held a professorial scholarship. In 1899 he defended his doctoral dissertation, On the Surgery of Transverse Fractures of the Patella, and in 1900 was elected privatdozent, lecturing on abdominal and thoracic surgery. He furthered his training abroad, including in the clinic of Ernst von Bergmann and at Rudolf Virchow's pathological institute in Berlin, and was one of the first surgeons in Kharkov to introduce aseptic methods into clinical practice.

He became an extraordinary professor at Kharkov University in 1905 and an ordinary (full) professor in 1910, heading the department of surgical pathology, desmurgy and the study of dislocations and fractures. From 1913 he directed the faculty surgical clinic. In 1913 he was granted the civil rank of actual state councillor.

=== Private hospital ===
Nikolai Trinkler in 1911

In 1906 Trinkler opened a 75-bed private hospital on Chernyshevskaya Street in Kharkov. He ran it as a modern clinical institution that also served as a teaching venue where students and doctors could observe surgery. He later transferred the hospital to the state.

=== Soviet period ===
After the Russian Revolution, Trinkler continued to work in Kharkov, becoming a professor at the Kharkov Medical Institute in 1921. He helped organise outpatient and inpatient services for the Red Cross, where he worked as a surgeon for many years, and served as a standing consultant to the hospital and clinic of the Kharkov Medical Society. In 1920 a festschrift was published marking forty years of his scientific, medical and teaching work, and in 1924 he received the title of Honoured Professor.

Although he received offers to head surgical departments at Moscow University, in Stockholm and in Baku, he declined them and remained in Kharkov.

== Surgical and scientific work ==
Trinkler was regarded as one of the most popular surgeons in the Russian Empire in the early 20th century and performed many complex operations in Kharkov. His contributions included:

- performing the second total gastrectomy (removal of the stomach) in the Russian Empire;
- proposing and testing an original method of draining the lateral ventricle of the brain with a special cannula in cases of hydrocephalus;
- describing visceral syphilis and its surgical manifestations, a subject on which he published in 1902;
- being among the first in the country to use X-rays therapeutically;
- advocating radical surgery in the treatment of cancer patients.

He wrote around 80 scientific works, and his students noted that his results were cited in both domestic and foreign textbooks. He was one of the founders of the Society of Russian Surgeons and headed the editorial board of the journal Vrachebnoe Delo (Medical Practice).

=== Selected works ===
- К хирургии поперечных переломов надколенника [On the Surgery of Transverse Fractures of the Patella]. Kharkov, 1899. (doctoral dissertation)
- О syphilis visceralis и его проявлениях в форме хирургических заболеваний [On Syphilis Visceralis and Its Manifestations as Surgical Diseases]. Kharkov, 1902.
- (with B. G. Przhevalsky and S. V. Korshun) Хронические воспаления и злокачественные новообразования [Chronic Inflammations and Malignant Neoplasms]. Kharkov, 1919.
- Основы современного лечения ран [Foundations of Modern Wound Treatment]. Kharkov: State Publishing House of Ukraine, 1926. (posthumous)

== Death and legacy ==
Trinkler died suddenly of an angina attack on 10 August 1925 while receiving treatment in Yevpatoria. He was buried in Kharkov's Second City Cemetery next to his teacher Wilhelm Grube.

A street in Kharkiv, Trinklera Street, is named in his honour. Kharkiv National Medical University marks his anniversaries, and his life has been the subject of a 1962 monograph by O. M. Lebedev and numerous articles by Ukrainian medical historians.
