= Larry Kennedy =

Larry Kennedy may refer to:

- Larry Kennedy (politician) (1949–2026), Canadian politician
- Larry Kennedy (baseball) (1917–1995), American professional baseball player
