= USS Aroostook (AOG-14) =

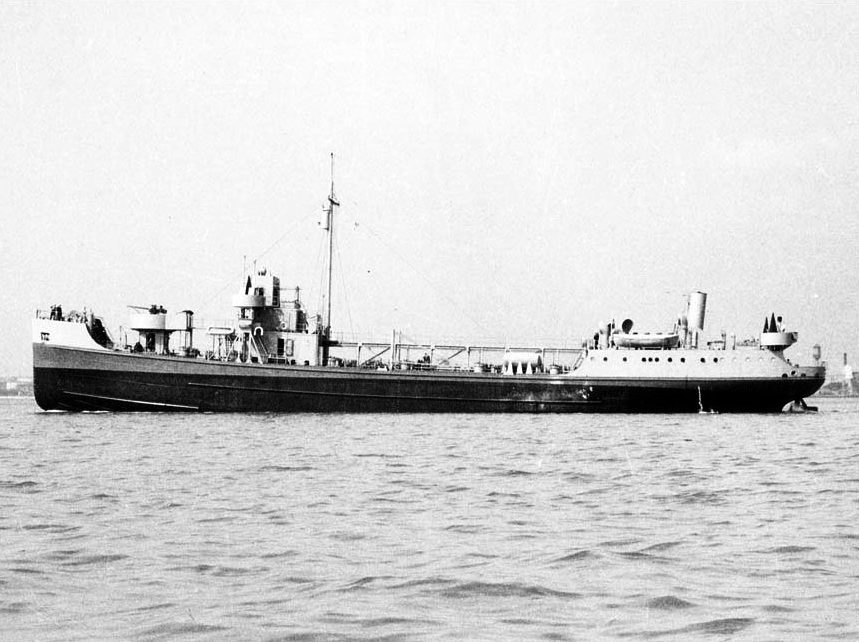
- Aroostook in 1943

History

United States
- Ordered: as tank barge Esso Delivery No.11
- Laid down: date unknown
- Launched: 8 December 1937
- Acquired: 1 April 1943
- Commissioned: 18 April 1943
- Decommissioned: 18 January 1945
- Stricken: date unknown
- Fate: Scrapped, 1953

General characteristics
- Displacement: 1,707 tons
- Length: 260 ft 6 in (79.40 m)
- Beam: 43 ft 6 in (13.26 m)
- Draught: 15 ft 11 in (4.85 m)
- Propulsion: diesel-electric, single propeller
- Speed: 10.5 knots
- Armament: one single 3 in (76 mm) dual purpose gun mount, four 20 mm guns

USS Aroostook (AOG-14) was a gasoline tanker acquired by the U.S. Navy for the dangerous task of transporting gasoline to warships in the fleet, and to remote Navy stations.

The third ship to be named Aroostook by the Navy, AOG-14 was originally built at Newport News, Virginia, as the single-screw, steel-hulled, diesel-electric, tank barge Esso Delivery No. 11 by the Newport News Shipbuilding and Dry Dock Co. Launched on 8 December 1937, she was delivered to the Standard Oil Co., of New Jersey, on 8 February 1938 and was homeported at Baltimore, Maryland, over the next few years.

Acquired by the Navy from the War Shipping Administration (WSA) on 1 April 1943, Esso Delivery No. 11 - the first all-welded construction tanker owned by Standard Oil - was renamed Aroostook, classified as a gasoline tanker, and designated AOG-14. The ship arrived at the Key Highway plant of Bethlehem Steel Corp., Baltimore, on 3 April 1943 and after conversion for naval service, was commissioned there on 18 April 1943.

== World War II service ==
Getting underway for Norfolk, Virginia, on the 21st, Aroostook tarried there only briefly before sailing on 28 April to join United States Naval Forces, Northwest African Waters. Proceeding via Bermuda and Gibraltar, she reached Oran, Tunisia, one month later to commence operations in that theater.

For the rest of her career under the American flag the gasoline tanker operated in the Mediterranean basin. Her ports of call included Bari, Isola Santo Stefano, Civitavecchia, Taranto, Piombino, Livorno, Palermo and Naples, Italy, as well as the island of Malta.

=== Under attack by the Luftwaffe ===
Only once during the entire period did she come in contact with the enemy. While she lay at Bari, Italy, on 2 December 1943, the German Luftwaffe raided that port. The ship sustained concussion and shrapnel damage when an ammunition ship exploded nearby, but she suffered no casualties among her men.

== Decommissioning ==
Decommissioned on 18 January 1945 at Bizerte, the ship was transferred to the French government the following day. Renamed Lac Pavin she served with the French Navy under lend-lease for four more years. Sold outright to the French Government on 21 March 1949, Aroostook was struck from the Naval Vessel Register on 28 April 1949. Ultimately, Lac Pavin was scrapped in 1953.
