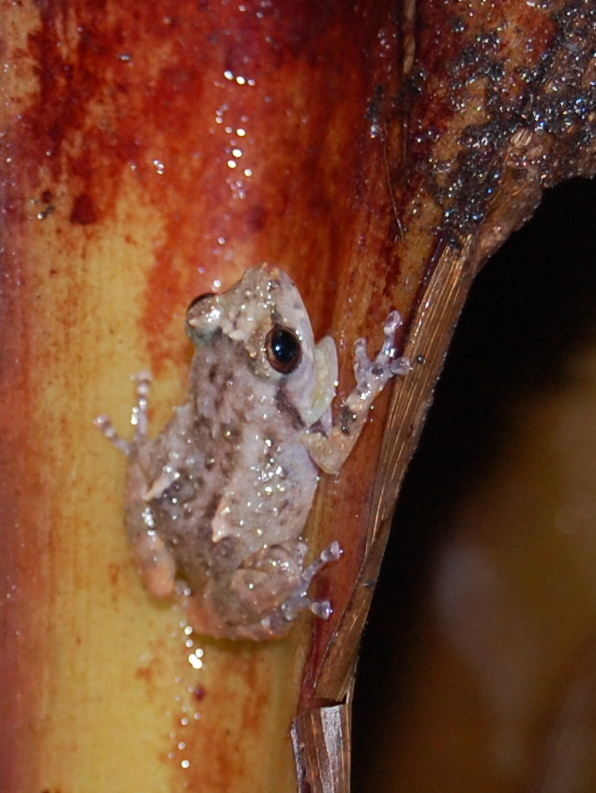
- Male in Costa Rica

Conservation status
- Least Concern (IUCN 3.1)

Scientific classification
- Kingdom: Animalia
- Phylum: Chordata
- Class: Amphibia
- Order: Anura
- Family: Eleutherodactylidae
- Genus: Diasporus
- Species: D. diastema

Binomial name
- Diasporus diastema (Cope, 1875)

Synonyms
- Hyla chica Noble, 1918; Syrrhopus ineptus Barbour, 1928; Eleutherodactylus diastema (Cope, 1875)

= Diasporus diastema =

Species of amphibian

Diasporus diastema is a species of frog in the family Eleutherodactylidae. Common names include common tink frog or dink frog, supposedly because of the loud metallic "tink" sound that the male frog makes during the night. It is found in Central America, from Honduras through Nicaragua and Costa Rica to Panama. Its natural habitats are tropical humid lowland forests and montane forests, but it can use very disturbed habitats. It is found from sea level to 1,620 m (5,310 ft) elevation.

Its color during daylight hours, when it hides, is grayish brown with spots or bars; when it emerges at night and becomes active, the frog takes on a pale pink or tan color.

The adult female reaches up to 1 inch (24 mm) long, and the male about 3/4 inch (21 mm). The tink frog has no free-swimming tadpole stage, and instead emerges as a miniature frog directly from the egg. Eggs are laid in bromeliads and tended by the male.

The diet of the tink frog consists mainly of ants and other arthropods.
