= Tinker, New Brunswick =

Coordinates: 46.809°N 67.764°W

Location of Tinker in New Brunswick

Tinker is a settlement in New Brunswick, Canada. It is home to the Tinker Dam. The settlement is named after Frank Tinker, who was a station worker at Andover.

== See also ==
- List of communities in New Brunswick
- Tinker Dam
