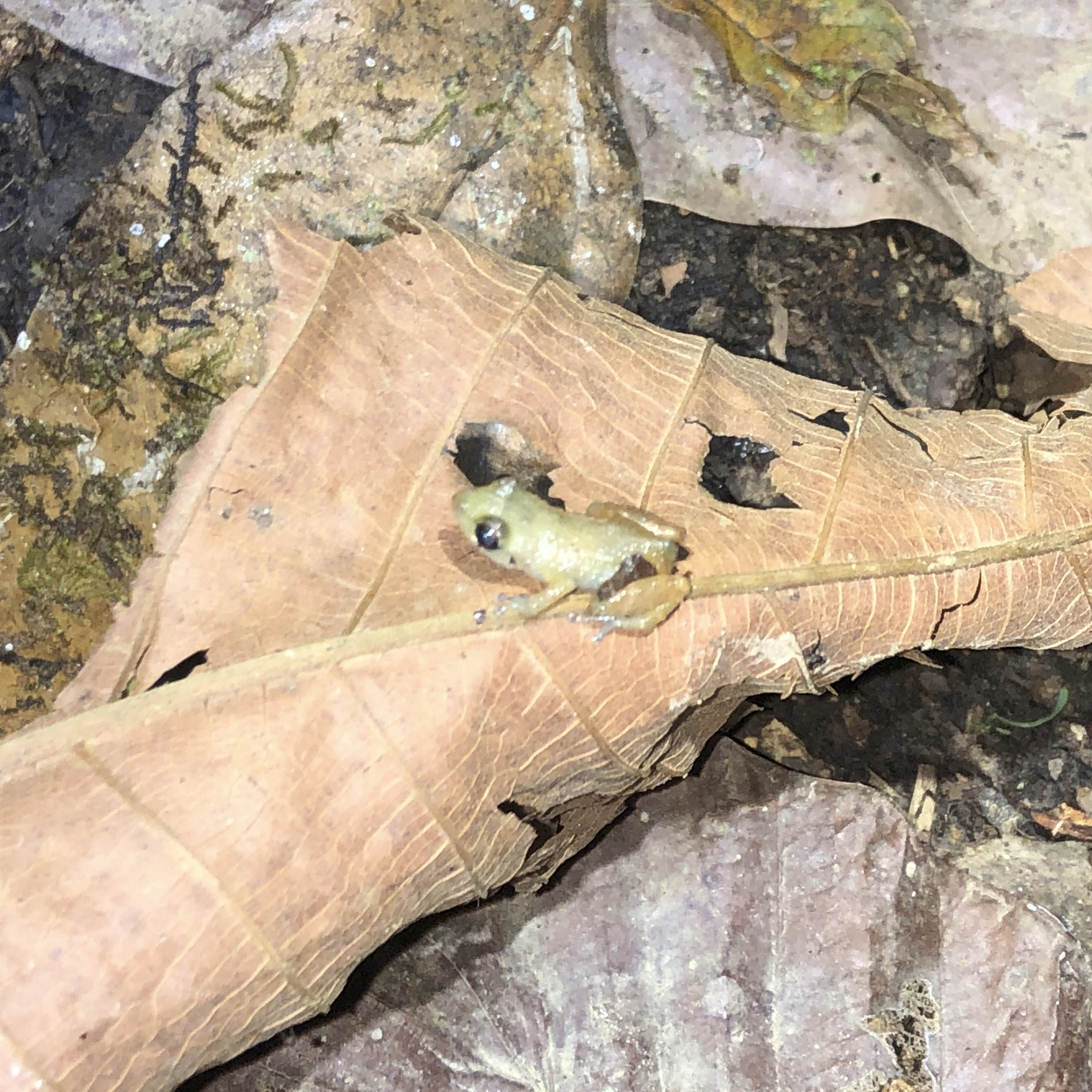

Conservation status
- Least Concern (IUCN 3.1)

Scientific classification
- Kingdom: Animalia
- Phylum: Chordata
- Class: Amphibia
- Order: Anura
- Family: Eleutherodactylidae
- Genus: Diasporus
- Species: D. vocator

Binomial name
- Diasporus vocator (Taylor, 1955)

Synonyms
- Eleutherodactylus vocator (Taylor, 1955)

= Diasporus vocator =

Species of frog

Diasporus vocator, sometimes known as Agua Buena robber frog after its type locality, Agua Buena, in Golfito canton of Costa Rica, is a species of frog in the family Eleutherodactylidae. It is found between southwestern Costa Rica and western Colombia on the Pacific versant and between central Panama and northern Colombia on the Atlantic versant. Its natural habitats are relatively pristine humid lowland and montaine forests, but it also occurs in secondary forest and tree plantations. It is threatened by habitat loss.
