= Aroostook, New Brunswick =

Aroostook
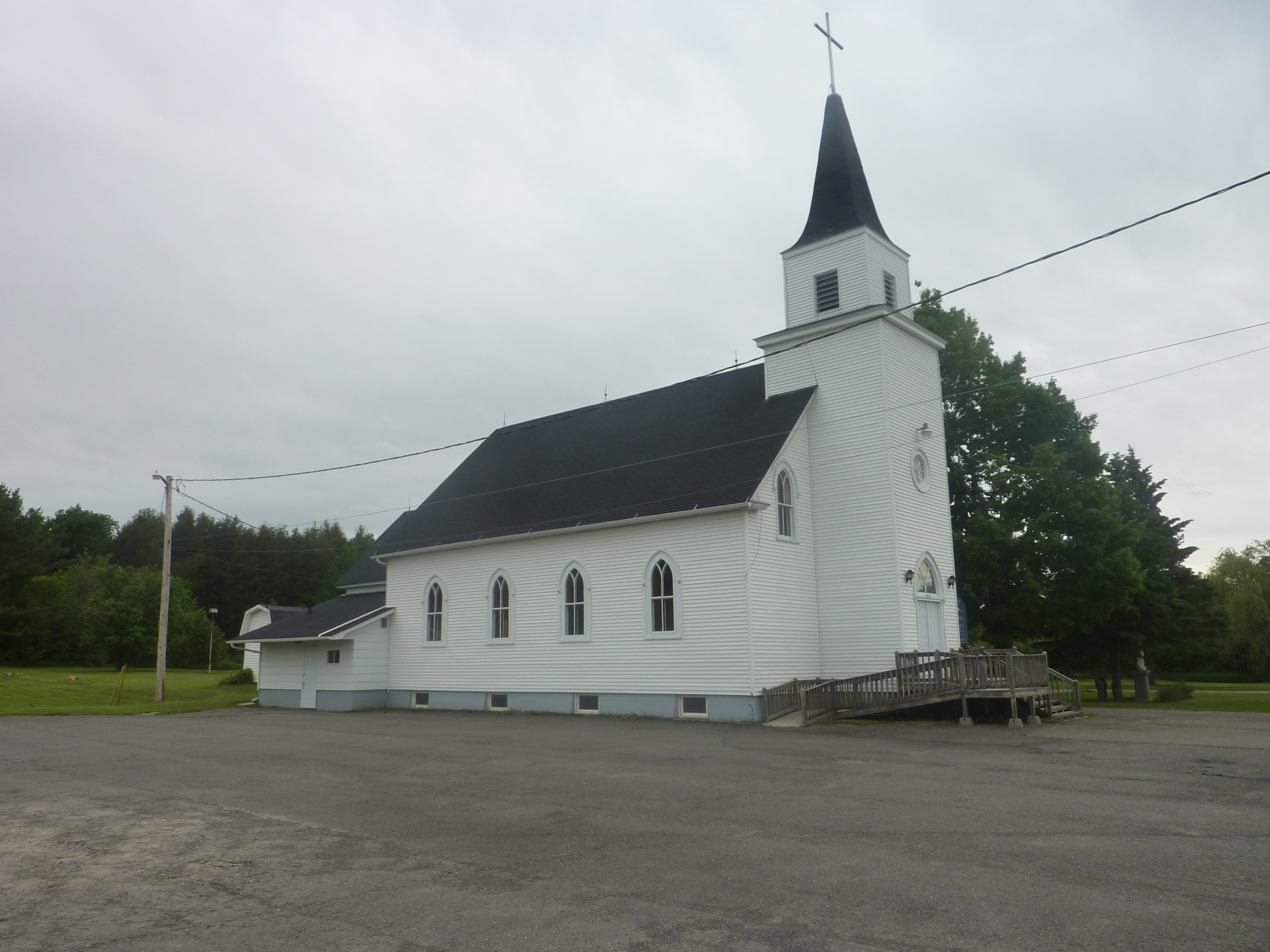
- Our Lady of Mercy Catholic Church

- Location of Aroostook in New Brunswick
- Coordinates: 46.8011°N 67.72436°W
- Country: Canada
- Province: New Brunswick
- County: Victoria
- Parish: Andover
- Municipality: Southern Victoria

Area
  - Land: 2.23 km^{2} (0.86 sq mi)

Population (2021)
  - Total: 313
  - Density: 140.2/km^{2} (363/sq mi)
  - Change 2016–21: ▲2.3%
  - Dwellings: 163
- Time zone: UTC-4 (AST)
  - Summer (DST): UTC-3 (ADT)
- Postal code(s): E3N: 0A7; 3V9; 3W1-3W6; 3Z2-3Z9; 4A1-4A6, 4A8-4A9; 4B1-4B9; 4C1-4C9; 4E1-4E9; 4G1-4G2, 4G4; 4H1; 4J2-4J3; 4K5; 4L3; 4N3; 4P4; 4R4, 4R6; 4S1-4S9; 4T1-4T2, 4T6; 5B7; 5C2-5C3, 5C5-5C6
- Area code: 506
- Access Routes Route 11: Route 134
- Website: www.atholville.net

Aroostook (/əˈruːstʊk/ ə-ROO-stuuk) is a former village in Victoria County, New Brunswick, Canada. It held village status prior to 2023. It is now part of the village of Southern Victoria.

== Geography ==
The community is located on the west bank of the Saint John River at the mouth of the Aroostook River. It is approximately 11 kilometres north of Perth-Andover.

== History ==
Aroostook was founded in 1852 and became an important railway centre in 1878 with the completion of the New Brunswick Railway from Fredericton to Edmundston and the Aroostook River Railway from Aroostook to Caribou, Maine. Both railways were leased by the Canadian Pacific Railway (CPR) in 1890 and a large rail yard and locomotive roundhouse was constructed in the village to service CPR trains operating in northwestern New Brunswick and northern Maine.

The construction of taxpayer-funded highways during the 20th century saw railways decline in use following World War II. CPR abandoned service through Aroostook in March 1987 following the loss of 2 bridges to ice jams downstream from the village.

On 1 January 2023, Aroostook amalgamated with Perth-Andover and parts of two local service districts to form the new village of Southern Victoria. The community's name remains in official use.

== Demographics ==
In the 2021 Census of Population conducted by Statistics Canada, Aroostook had a population of 313 living in 148 of its 163 total private dwellings, a change of 2.3% from its 2016 population of 306. With a land area of 2.23 km^{2} (0.86 sq mi), it had a population density of 140.4/km^{2} (363.5/sq mi) in 2021. Revised census figures based on the 2023 local governance reforms have not been released.

Historical Census Data - Aroostook, New Brunswick
Year	Pop.	±%
2006	346	—
2011	351	+1.4%
2016	306	−12.8%
2021	313	+2.3%

== See also ==
- List of communities in New Brunswick
