= Millinocket Lake (Aroostook River) =

Lake in Piscataquis County, Maine, United States

- Location within Maine Location within the United States
- Location: Piscataquis County, Maine
- Coordinates: 46°18′N 68°52′W
- Primary inflows: Chandler Brook; Moose Brook
- Primary outflows: Millinocket Stream
- Basin countries: United States
- Max. length: 6 mi (9.7 km)
- Max. width: 1 mi (1.6 km)
- Surface area: 2,730 acres (1,100 ha)
- Max. depth: 54 feet (16 m)
- Water volume: 852 acre⋅ft (1,051,000 m^{3})
- Surface elevation: 755 ft (230 m)

Millinocket Lake is the source of Millinocket Stream in the North Maine Woods north of Baxter State Park. Millinocket Stream flows 5.5 miles (8.9 km) to Maine township 8, range 8, where it joins Munsungan Stream to form the Aroostook River. The lake extending along the border of Maine range 9 townships 7 and 8 is impounded behind a wooden dam. The dam enlarged the lake to include Little Millinocket Lake and Moose Pond by flooding adjoining bogs to store water for hydropower. The large areas of shallow flooded bog are a good habitat for fallfish, yellow perch and white suckers; but with summer water temperatures ranging from 70° near the surface to 55° in the deeper areas, dissolved oxygen concentrations become unfavorable for trout. Tributaries to the lake drain a number of small ponds to the west of the lake including Atkins Pond, Blackmore Pond, Buckley Pond, Big Caribou Pond, Little Caribou Pond, Chandler Pond, Elsie Pond, Ervin Pond, Jack Pond, Kyle Pond, Line Pond, Mathews Pond, May Pond, Little Moose Pond, Upper Moose Pond, Pretty Pond, Snowshoe Pond, and Spring Pond.
