= Tinkle (surname) =

Tinkle is a surname. Notable people with the surname include:

- Donald W. Tinkle (1930–1980), herpetologist, ecologist and evolutionary biologist at the University of Michigan
- Joslyn Tinkle (born 1990), American basketball player
- Lon Tinkle (1906–1980), historian, author, book critic, and professor who specialized in the history of Texas
- Tres Tinkle (born 1996), American basketball player
- Wayne Tinkle (born 1966), American college basketball coach

== See also ==
- Tinkle, Indian magazine
- Tinkler (surname)
