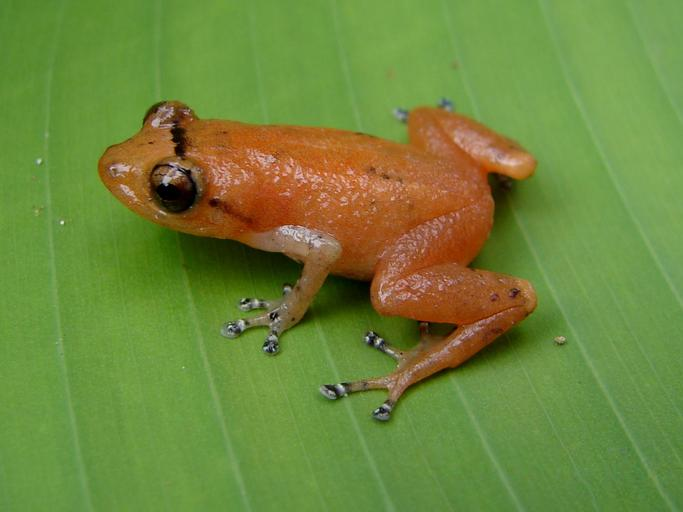

Conservation status
- Least Concern (IUCN 3.1)

Scientific classification
- Kingdom: Animalia
- Phylum: Chordata
- Class: Amphibia
- Order: Anura
- Family: Eleutherodactylidae
- Genus: Diasporus
- Species: D. gularis

Binomial name
- Diasporus gularis (Boulenger, 1898)

Synonyms
- Hylodes gularis Boulenger, 1898; Eleutherodactylus gularis (Boulenger, 1898); Hyloxalus huigrae Fowler, 1913

= Diasporus gularis =

Species of frog

Diasporus gularis, also known as the Esmeraldas robber frog, is a species of frog in the family Eleutherodactylidae. It is found in western Colombia (Córdoba Department in the north through Antioquia and Chocó Departments to the Valle del Cauca, Cauca, and Nariño Departments in the southwest) and northwestern and central Ecuador (Esmeraldas, Imbabura, and Chimborazo Provinces).

== Description ==
Adult males measure 17–22 mm (0.7–0.9 in) and adult females 21–25 mm (0.8–1.0 in) in snout–vent length. The head is as wide as the body and longer than it is wide. The snout is long, and subacuminate in dorsal view, and truncate in lateral view. The tympanum has its upper edge hidden by the low, poorly defined supra-tympanic fold. The fingers have weak lateral keels and small discs. The toes are basally webbed and have lanceolate discs. Dorsal skin is smooth but may have low tubercles in some specimens. The dorsum is yellowish-tan with yellow flanks. There are some reddish brown dorsal markings: an inter-orbital bar, narrow canthal and broader post-orbital stripes, as well as smaller markings in the scapular region and on the shanks. The iris is golden bronze and has a reddish-brown horizontal streak.

The male advertisement call is a "whistle", consisting of a single tonal note lasting about 0.11 seconds and produced at a rate of 5.2 calls/minute. The call has four harmonics and a peak frequency of 2.7–3.0 kHz.

== Habitat and conservation ==
Diasporus gularis is a very common frog occurring in both primary forest and disturbed habitats, including deforested areas, at elevations up to 1,770 m (5,810 ft) above sea level but mostly below 400 m (1,300 ft). It is much more common in secondary, degraded vegetation than in primary forests. This adaptable species occurs also in many protected areas and is not facing significant threats.
