= John Tinker =

John Tinker may refer to:

- Joe Tinker (politician) (John Joseph Tinker, 1875–1957), British Labour Party Member of Parliament for Leigh 1923–1945
- John Tinker (colonial administrator) (1700–1758), governor of the Bahamas 1741–1758
- John Tinker, lead plaintiff in Tinker v. Des Moines Independent Community School District, a U.S. Supreme Court case on student freedom of speech
- John Tinker (TV producer) (born 1958), American television producer/writer
- John Tinker (Royal Navy officer) (c. 1725–1767)
