= Reto Trinkler =

Swiss blockchain entrepreneur and software developer

- Born: c. 1990
- Education: ETH Zurich (mathematics)
- Occupations: Software developer, entrepreneur
- Known for: Co-founder of Melonport (Melon / Enzyme protocol); founding council member of the Web3 Foundation
- Awards: Forbes 30 Under 30 Europe – Finance (2018)

Reto Trinkler (born c. 1990) is a Swiss software developer and entrepreneur known for his work on Ethereum-based decentralized finance. He co-founded Melonport AG, the Zug-based company that developed the Melon protocol for on-chain asset management (later renamed Enzyme), and was a founding council member of the Web3 Foundation, the organisation behind the Polkadot network. In 2018 he was named to the Forbes 30 Under 30 Europe list in the finance category.

== Early life and education ==
Trinkler studied mathematics at ETH Zurich. Before working in blockchain, he developed a trading algorithm for sports betting exchanges in C++.

== Career ==
=== Early blockchain work ===
Trinkler began developing Ethereum smart contracts shortly after the network's launch in 2015. He worked as a smart-contract developer at Brainbot Technologies, the company developing the Raiden Network, and hosted Zurich's Blockchain Hacklab.

=== Melonport ===
Trinkler met former Goldman Sachs trader Mona El Isa in Zurich, where she was mentoring developers in the local blockchain community, and the two co-founded Melonport AG in the summer of 2016. Based in Zug, the company set out to build Melon, an open-source protocol on Ethereum allowing users to set up, manage and invest in digital-asset funds whose rules are enforced by smart contracts. Trinkler served as chairman and chief technology officer, with El Isa as chief executive. In a 2017 profile, El Isa described Trinkler as a programmer worth five ordinary developers.

In February 2017 Melonport held a token sale of its MLN token, selling around 599,400 tokens and raising about CHF 2.5 million in under ten minutes. The token was listed on the Kraken exchange in March 2017. Melonport counted Ethereum co-founder Gavin Wood among its advisers, and also took part in early work on deploying Wood's Polkadot network. In early 2018 the Swiss business magazine Bilanz described Trinkler as one of Switzerland's leading blockchain experts, as Melonport prepared to launch a platform allowing a fund to be set up within minutes.

In 2018 Trinkler announced plans to step back from Melonport to develop a separate Melon blockchain as a contract project for the company. Following the protocol's main-network launch in February 2019, Melonport AG wound down and governance passed to an independent Melon Council; the protocol was later renamed Enzyme and is maintained by Avantgarde Finance.

=== Web3 Foundation and Trinkler Software ===
Trinkler is one of the founding council members of the Web3 Foundation in Zug, alongside Gavin Wood and Aeron Buchanan; the foundation was established to support decentralised web technologies, with Polkadot as its flagship project. He has also served as a grants evaluator for the foundation's Open Grants Program.

He subsequently founded Trinkler Software, of which he has served as chief executive and chairman.

== Recognition ==
- Forbes 30 Under 30 Europe – Finance (2018), and the Forbes Switzerland list the same year
