= Southern Victoria =

- Village
- Regional Community of Southern Victoria
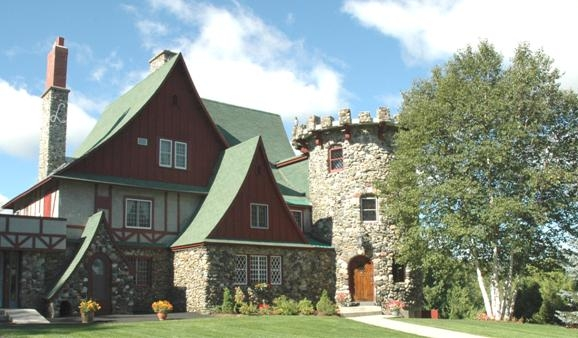
- The Castle Inn

- Location within New Brunswick
- Coordinates: 46°44′21″N 67°41′54″W
- Country: Canada
- Province: New Brunswick
- County: Victoria
- Regional service commission: Western Valley
- Incorporated: January 1, 2023

Government
  - Mayor: Tamara Titus McPhail
  - MP: Richard Bragdon (CPC)
  - MLA: Margaret Johnson (PC)
- Elevation: 183 m (600 ft)
- Time zone: UTC-4 (AST)
  - Summer (DST): UTC-3 (ADT)
- Postal code(s): E3N,E7H
- Area code: 506
- Telephone Exchange: 273, 819
- Access Routes Route 11: Route 134

Southern Victoria is a village in the Canadian province of New Brunswick. It was formed through the 2023 New Brunswick local governance reforms.

== History ==
Southern Victoria was incorporated on January 1, 2023 via the amalgamation of the former villages of Aroostook and Perth-Andover as well as the concurrent annexation of adjacent unincorporated areas.

== Geography ==
The village is divided by the Saint John River.

== Attractions ==
Southern Victoria is host to the annual Gathering of the Scots Festival at Veteran's Field on the last weekend in May and the Larlee Creek Hullabaloo in August, held at Baird's Campground. Other major events in the Village are the Tuff Muck Challenge on the last Saturday in July and the Dam Run marathon on the first Saturday in October.

== Infrastructure ==
Perth-Andover Electric Light Commission (PAELC) is one of three municipal power utilities left in New Brunswick, and the only one completely independent of NB Power. The residents of the municipality pay the lowest power rates in the province.

== Notable people ==
- Matt Andersen - Blues musician
- John B. McNair- 23rd Premier of New Brunswick, 1940 to 1952

== See also ==
- List of communities in New Brunswick
- List of municipalities in New Brunswick
