= Gustav Trinkler =

Russian and Soviet engineer and inventor (1876–1957)

- Густав Васильевич Тринклер
- Born: 24 April 1876; Saint Petersburg, Russian Empire
- Died: 4 February 1957 (aged 80); Gorky, Soviet Union
- Resting place: Bugrovskoe Cemetery, Nizhny Novgorod
- Alma mater: Saint Petersburg Technological Institute (1899)
- Known for: Compressorless diesel engine ("Trinkler engine"); Trinkler cycle
- Spouse: Mariia Evgenyevna Sviiazeva (m. 1908)
- Children: 4 (one died in infancy)
- Awards: Order of the Red Banner of Labour (1956)
- Scientific career
- Fields: Mechanical engineering, internal combustion engines
- Workplaces: Putilov Works; Körting Brothers, Hanover; Sormovo Works; Nizhny Novgorod University; Gorky Institute of Water Transport Engineers; Gorky Industrial Institute

Gustav Vasilyevich Trinkler (Russian: Густав Васильевич Тринклер); (24 April 1876 – 4 February 1957) was a Russian and Soviet engineer and inventor, best known for developing an early compressorless diesel engine, marketed in Germany as the "Trinkler engine". In Russia, the dual combustion cycle is named the Trinkler cycle after him.

Born into a prosperous merchant family of largely German descent, Trinkler is also of interest to historians as a pre-revolutionary "bourgeois specialist" who succeeded in maintaining a comfortable, upper-class way of life across the Russian Revolution, the Stalin era and his own imprisonment, largely through his technical expertise and a lifelong habit of petitioning the authorities.

== Early life and education ==
Trinkler was born in Saint Petersburg, the youngest of four surviving children. His father, Ioann-Wilhelm Trinkler, was a Baltic German born in Reval who traded between Saint Petersburg and Moscow, owned a factory, and held the status of first-guild merchant and "honorary citizen". His mother, Ekaterina-Adel, was the daughter of a German, Friedrich Adolf Gaspari, and a Frenchwoman, Theresa Mortier. In his memoir Trinkler described his family as strongly "international", listing Swiss, Italian, German, French and Polish ancestry on his mother's side and Estonian-German and Swedish ancestry on his father's, while insisting that by culture and education the family was entirely Russian.

His father died when he was eleven, and his mother oversaw the children's education. The children shared a nursery with a German nursemaid, heard fairy tales in Russian and German, and were taught by several French tutors; Trinkler later spoke German, French and English well. After a private progymnasium he attended the Larin Gymnasium, a classical school whose intake was restricted largely to the privileged classes, graduating in 1894. He then studied at the Saint Petersburg Technological Institute, graduating as an engineer in 1899 with his name engraved on the institute's marble board of distinction, and served a year as a volunteer in the Izmaylovsky Regiment.

His diploma named him Gustav Wilhelmovich, but by 1906 he had adopted the Russian patronymic Vasilyevich while keeping his German first name and surname. His siblings went further and Russified their first names, becoming Georgii, Elizaveta and Vasilii. Trinkler identified as Russian throughout his life.

== Career ==
=== The Trinkler engine ===
While still a student, Trinkler began designing a new heat engine running on liquid fuel with compression ignition. From 1898 to 1902 he worked as an engineer at the Putilov Works in Saint Petersburg. In his later autobiographies he gave changing explanations for leaving: in 1917 he cited failed experiments, while by 1952 he blamed the factory director S. I. Smirnov for halting funding, suggesting Smirnov may have acted under pressure from Emanuel Nobel, from whom Trinkler said he had received a threatening letter.

From 1902 to 1907 Trinkler was chief designer at the Körting Brothers company in Hanover, where he developed, tested and installed his engine for customers. In 1905 Körting put it into production as the "Trinkler system engine", and it was patented in twelve countries. A 2011 study argued that Russian diesel engineering would have benefited had Nobel, whose firm held the Russian rights to Rudolf Diesel's engine, supported rather than obstructed Trinkler's design.

=== Sormovo works ===
In 1907 Trinkler returned to Russia to head the heat engines department of the Sormovo Works near Nizhny Novgorod, then one of Russia's largest industrial enterprises with around 8,500 employees. Engines built under his direction earned the factory Grand Gold Medals at the 1910 exhibitions in Baku and Yekaterinoslav, and in the Soviet period he oversaw construction of the first large two-stroke engine built in the USSR. He founded and was the first director of the Sormovo machine-building technical college. From 1928 to 1930 he served as a consultant rather than head of engine construction.

=== First World War ===
During the First World War Trinkler served in the Russian army. After repeatedly petitioning for a post suited to his technical skills, he was sent to Persia by December 1915 to organise transport behind the expeditionary forces, and in April 1916 was transferred to the Kars Engineering Office.

=== Academic career and arrest ===
Trinkler began teaching at the evacuated Warsaw Polytechnic Institute in Nizhny Novgorod on 1 October 1917, and from 1919 was a professor of internal combustion engines at Nizhny Novgorod University.

On 3 January 1930 he was arrested by the OGPU on suspicion of sabotage at the Sormovo Works, during the wider campaign against "bourgeois specialists" associated with the Shakhty and Industrial Party trials. A local newspaper named him among a "bloody pack" allegedly directed by émigré industrialists, the French general staff and Raymond Poincaré. On 16 August 1930 he was sentenced to ten years of forced labour, which he served in a sharashka (a prison design bureau) in Moscow. There he continued engine design work and supervised designers from the Kolomna Locomotive Works, and the OGPU allocated ten million roubles (over US$600 million in 2026) to his engine project. He was released on 16 April 1932 and continued to work in the OGPU technical department until spring 1934, while also teaching at the Moscow Electro-Technical Institute of Transport Engineers.

=== Later career ===
From 1934 Trinkler taught at the Gorky Institute of Water Transport Engineers, heading its department of marine internal combustion engines. In May 1935 he was awarded the degree of Doctor of Technical Sciences without defending a dissertation, under a 1934 decree permitting degrees for special merit, and in the same year was confirmed in the rank of professor. In 1938 he attended a reception in the Moscow Kremlin as a delegate to the All-Union council on higher education, and in 1939 served on the thermodynamics commission of the Krzhizhanovsky Energy Institute of the USSR Academy of Sciences. From 1944 to 1949 he headed the department of internal combustion engines at the Gorky Industrial Institute (now Nizhny Novgorod State Technical University), where he also organised a department of tank engines.

His criminal record was formally expunged on 1 April 1950, after he petitioned the Ministry of State Security because it was blocking his appointment to a general's rank in the Ministry of the River Fleet. In 1952 he was dismissed from the Water Transport Institute, which he attributed to being labelled a "cosmopolitan". He nevertheless continued working, obtaining funds to test an engine in 1954 and beginning a textbook, Theory of Engines.

== Bourgeois lifestyle across the Revolution ==
Historian Zinaida Osipova, in a 2020 study based on Trinkler's personal archive, argues that Trinkler is a rare documented example of a pre-revolutionary "bourgeois specialist" who neither remade himself to fit Bolshevik ideals nor concealed his background, but instead deliberately rebuilt the comfortable middle-class life he had known under the Tsars. She attributes his success to the value of his engineering expertise to the Soviet state and to his skill at petitioning, a habit he had practised long before 1917. Osipova compares this to the "Big Deal" that historian Vera Dunham argued the Soviet regime struck with the middle class after the Second World War, suggesting Trinkler made a similar bargain decades earlier: hard work for the state in exchange for material comfort.

=== Imperial-era lifestyle ===
Trinkler grew up in a spacious apartment on the Sixth Line of Vasilyevsky Island and spent childhood summers at dachas outside Saint Petersburg, including at Lakhta, where he developed a lifelong love of gardening; he later called pumpkin his favourite crop. As an engineer at Sormovo he earned far more than the average Russian: on the eve of the First World War the average annual salary was around 360 roubles, while engineers at private factories could earn up to 3,000.

The family rented an apartment and employed a cook and a maid. In 1912 Trinkler sent his wife and daughter on holiday to Crimea, staying at a hotel in Sevastopol, at a time when Crimean resorts were largely the preserve of the wealthy. He skied, rented summer houses at Kstovo in 1910 and on the Volga in 1912, and insured his property. In 1912–1913 he paid the rent on the premises of the Sormovo reading library as a charitable donation.

At the end of 1913 he bought a country estate at Doskino, outside Nizhny Novgorod, for 18,000 roubles, payable in instalments. It measured about 33 hectares on paper and about 84 hectares according to its ground plan, and he soon bought a horse for it. When war cut his income in 1914, he petitioned the Sormovo director for a one-off payment of 544 roubles to meet his obligations on the estate. In 1917 the family's letters show both enthusiasm for the February Revolution and fear that peasant unrest would reach Doskino, which Trinkler described as the family's "shrine".

=== Keeping the estate after 1917 ===
Unlike many landowners, Trinkler held on to Doskino through the early Soviet period. In 1921 he petitioned the provincial land office and electoral commission about the estate, and in 1922 bought a cow and a horse for it. In 1923 he obtained an official certificate from the provincial land administration describing his farm as a well-run "cultural economy" that set an example to the surrounding peasants, a document Osipova interprets as a means of protecting his property and status. He still mentioned Doskino in 1929 but probably lost it after his arrest and the collectivisation campaign.

Like the rest of the population, he faced shortages during the Civil War: in 1921 he lived partly on academic rations, sold surplus butter at market and petitioned for shoes for his family. By July 1921 he was receiving a full academic allowance. His brother urged him to emigrate to Estonia, their father's homeland, or move to Petrograd, but he chose to stay.

=== Holidays, culture and religion in the 1920s ===
After the Revolution the former aristocratic resorts of the south were officially redirected towards workers and peasants, but the Trinklers continued to holiday there. In 1926 Trinkler spent over a month touring Kislovodsk, Pyatigorsk, Mineralnye Vody, Batumi, Sochi, Baku and other destinations, partly by steamboat; in 1928 the whole family holidayed in the south, photographed in front of a palm tree; and in 1929 his wife and daughter Nina went to Sochi while he took a steamboat cruise to Baku and Ashkhabad.

On frequent work trips to Moscow he went to the theatre, including the newly founded Moscow Satire Theatre, Swan Lake, and the Moscow Music Hall, later closed in 1937 for its "bourgeois" art. In 1926 he took his daughter to see Notre-Dame de Paris. Despite state anti-religious campaigns, the family attended church and celebrated Easter, Trinity and Christmas through the 1920s. In 1925 he made an official trip to Germany and reported on factory practices the USSR might adopt.

=== The five-room apartment ===
In January 1928 the family moved into a newly built apartment in the "Scientific Worker" housing cooperative in Nizhny Novgorod, helped by a 500-rouble contribution from the university. It had five rooms and 78.23 square metres, at a time when the average living space in Moscow was about 5.5 square metres per person. In 1929 Trinkler also filed a detailed complaint about poor construction of the cooperative's second building, and petitioned the prosecutor's office to secure overtime pay for an expert commission he chaired.

After his arrest the family struggled to keep the apartment. Trinkler insisted from prison that his wife should not give it up, drafted petitions for her to contest extra charges demanded by the cooperative, and advised selling bonds and possessions. The family moved to another flat within the cooperative and rented out three rooms; by late 1931 their housing debt had reached 1,825 roubles, and they were still repaying it in 1934.

=== Privileges in prison ===
Osipova argues that Trinkler's early letters from custody, which he knew the secret police would read, stressed the importance of his engineering work as an implicit petition for better treatment. The approach succeeded: he was allowed to pursue his own projects, wrote that his conditions had "greatly improved" thanks to his creative work, and was transferred to Moscow when one of his designs was approved. In 1931 he received 200 roubles towards his daughter's hospital treatment, and in 1932 the OGPU paid his wife 1,000 roubles, close to 80 per cent of the average Soviet annual salary. His wife sent generous food parcels, and he read War and Peace and other novels in prison while directing his children's education, urging his daughters to learn foreign languages and stenography and discouraging Nina from becoming a factory lathe-worker so she could enter a technical institute.

=== Petitioning under Stalin ===
On 7 May 1934 Trinkler petitioned Deputy People's Commissar of Heavy Industry Mikhail Kaganovich, brother of Lazar Kaganovich, for a "decent salary", a larger allowance and an immediate 36-square-metre apartment, four times the nine square metres he then occupied in Moscow, or alternatively a transfer back to Gorky. Within months he was teaching in Gorky. A second petition to Kaganovich for a reward for his creative work brought him 8,000 roubles. In 1938 his Moscow institute petitioned to let him keep an eight-square-metre room in the capital even after he had registered his residence in Gorky.

=== Dacha, resorts and insurance ===
In 1937 Trinkler struck a deal with a dacha association at Zelyony Gorod, a resort settlement near Gorky: he would build a dacha for the association at his own expense in return for a plot of land. The following year he was planting potatoes and melons there. In 1940, after a colleague's plot was confiscated as collective-farm land, he had his daughters join the association and take shares of his plot to secure it, and asked for the dacha to be valued and insured at 15,000 roubles. He kept his property insured with the state insurer Gosstrakh from the late 1930s to the early 1950s, as he had with private insurers before the Revolution.

In 1936, at the height of the Great Purge, he obtained a medical voucher for a stay at a health resort in Sochi; as early as 1920 he had obtained a certificate stating that he needed sanatorium treatment. In official questionnaires he recorded his nationality as Russian, his class as "employee" (sluzhashchii) and himself as non-party, and in the late 1930s he attended evening courses in Marxism–Leninism, which Osipova interprets as a pragmatic accommodation rather than ideological conversion.

=== War years and old age ===
During the Great Patriotic War Trinkler petitioned for a special ration card, and in 1941 protested the requisitioning of rooms in his apartment for another family, citing his age and his standing as a scholar "known even abroad"; this time he was unsuccessful. At 68 he also petitioned against an order to surrender his dog to a Red Army school, citing his age, his First World War service and the dog's advanced years.

After his wife was paralysed in 1948, Trinkler hired a live-in housekeeper in 1951 to clean, cook and care for her, at 150 roubles a month; his own salary in the same document was 6,000 roubles, against a national average of 661. Osipova notes that this arrangement echoed the cook, maid and nursemaid of his pre-revolutionary household.

== Wartime writings ==
Trinkler's three siblings, who had lived in Leningrad all their lives, died during the Siege of Leningrad in 1941–1942. During the war he wrote a series of strongly anti-German articles, drawing openly on his years in Germany. "Vi zibtsig" (a German boast meaning "like [18]70"), published in Gorkovskaya Kommuna on 12 February 1943, argued that German arrogance had been crushed at Stalingrad; an expanded version submitted to Izvestia in 1944 was not published. In 1944 and on 9 May 1945 he drafted articles, one sent to Pravda, proposing that artworks of Russian origin in Germany be returned as reparations, and drew attention to Raphael's Sistine Madonna in Dresden.

== Personal life ==
In 1907 Trinkler unsuccessfully sought to marry Olga Dyakonova. In 1908 he married Mariia Evgenyevna Sviiazeva, an 18-year-old ethnic Russian from Nizhny Novgorod. Their first daughter, Erika, born in 1909, died in infancy; the family continued to call their next daughter Erika, although her official name was Irina. They later had a daughter, Nina, and a son, Iurii (born January 1923), who became a botanist. Trinkler was a Lutheran and a member of the French Reformed Church parish in Petrograd; his wife was Orthodox, and their daughters were baptised Orthodox. His cousin Nikolai Petrovich Trinkler was a surgeon and professor at Kharkiv University, after whom a street in Kharkiv was named.

== Death and legacy ==
In 1956, for his eightieth birthday, Trinkler was awarded the Order of the Red Banner of Labour, announced on the front page of Pravda on 1 July 1956. He died in Gorky on 4 February 1957 and was buried in Bugrovskoe Cemetery. He wrote several dozen scientific works, including the memoir-history Engine Building over Half a Century: Sketches of a Contemporary (1954), and a memorial plaque is installed on the second academic building of Nizhny Novgorod State Technical University.

The dual combustion cycle, in which fuel burns first at constant volume and then at constant pressure, is known in Russia as the Trinkler cycle; elsewhere it is commonly called the Sabathé cycle or Seiliger cycle. His personal papers are held in the Central Archive of Nizhny Novgorod Oblast (collection R-6043).
