= Fort Fairfield, Maine =

Town in Maine, United States

- Town
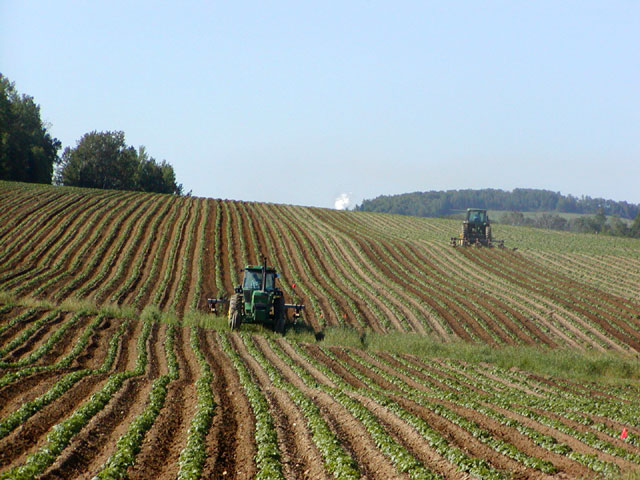
- Potato field in Fort Fairfield

- Seal
- Motto: "Friendship-Love-Truth"
- Location of Fort Fairfield, Maine
- Coordinates: 46°45′23″N 67°52′18″W
- Country: United States
- State: Maine
- County: Aroostook
- Villages: Fort Fairfield; Maple Grove; Stevensville

Area
  - Total: 78.36 sq mi (202.95 km^{2})
  - Land: 76.67 sq mi (198.57 km^{2})
  - Water: 1.69 sq mi (4.38 km^{2})
- Elevation: 420 ft (130 m)

Population (2020)
  - Total: 3,347
  - Density: 43/sq mi (16.7/km^{2})
- Time zone: UTC-5 (Eastern (EST))
  - Summer (DST): UTC-4 (EDT)
- ZIP Code: 04742
- Area code: 207
- GNIS feature ID: 582476
- Website: www.fortfairfield.org

Fort Fairfield is a town in Aroostook County, eastern Maine, United States, located along the Canada–US border. The population was 3,322 at the 2020 census.

== History ==
Fort Fairfield is named for John Fairfield, 13th and 16th governor of Maine.

== Geography ==
According to the United States Census Bureau, the town has a total area of 78.36 square miles (202.95 km^{2}), of which 76.67 square miles (198.57 km^{2}) is land and 1.69 square miles (4.38 km^{2}) is water.

== Demographics ==
Historical population
Census	Pop.	Note	%±
1840	26		—
1860	901		—
1870	1,893		110.1%
1880	2,807		48.3%
1890	3,526		25.6%
1900	4,181		18.6%
1910	4,381		4.8%
1920	4,551		3.9%
1930	5,393		18.5%
1940	5,607		4.0%
1950	5,791		3.3%
1960	5,876		1.5%
1970	4,859		−17.3%
1980	4,376		−9.9%
1990	3,998		−8.6%
2000	3,579		−10.5%
2010	3,496		−2.3%
2020	3,322		−5.0%
U.S. Decennial Census

=== 2010 census ===
As of the census of 2010, there were 3,496 people, 1,494 households, and 952 families living in the town. The population density was 45.6 inhabitants per square mile (17.6/km^{2}). There were 1,674 housing units at an average density of 21.8 per square mile (8.4/km^{2}). The racial makeup of the town was 96.5% White, 0.9% African American, 0.5% Native American, 0.2% Asian, 0.3% from other races, and 1.5% from two or more races. Hispanic or Latino of any race were 1.3% of the population.

There were 1,494 households, of which 28.0% had children under the age of 18 living with them, 47.1% were married couples living together, 11.8% had a female householder with no husband present, 4.9% had a male householder with no wife present, and 36.3% were non-families. 31.0% of all households were made up of individuals, and 13.5% had someone living alone who was 65 years of age or older. The average household size was 2.34 and the average family size was 2.88.

The median age in the town was 43.8 years. 22.5% of residents were under the age of 18; 6.7% were between the ages of 18 and 24; 22.8% were from 25 to 44; 30.7% were from 45 to 64; and 17.2% were 65 years of age or older. The gender makeup of the town was 48.4% male and 51.6% female.

=== 2000 census ===
Languages (2000)	Percent
Spoke English at home	94.31%
Spoke French at home	5.69%

As of the census of 2000, there were 3,579 people, 1,523 households, and 1,015 families living in the town. The population density was 46.7 inhabitants per square mile (18.0/km^{2}). There were 1,654 housing units at an average density of 21.6 per square mile (8.3/km^{2}). The racial makeup of the town was 98.35% White, 0.20% Black or African American, 0.45% Native American, 0.03% Asian, 0.03% Pacific Islander, 0.20% from other races, and 0.75% from two or more races. Hispanic or Latino of any race were 0.75% of the population.

There were 1,523 households, out of which 27.7% had children under the age of 18 living with them, 52.9% were married couples living together, 10.2% had a female householder with no husband present, and 33.3% were non-families. 29.0% of all households were made up of individuals, and 14.8% had someone living alone who was 65 years of age or older. The average household size was 2.35 and the average family size was 2.86.

In the town, the population was spread out, with 23.4% under the age of 18, 6.8% from 18 to 24, 25.5% from 25 to 44, 27.2% from 45 to 64, and 17.0% who were 65 years of age or older. The median age was 41 years. For every 100 females, there were 88.3 males. For every 100 females age 18 and over, there were 86.9 males.

The median annual income for a household in the town was $28,563, and the median income for a family was $33,446. Males had a median income of $28,448 versus $25,000 for females. The per capita income for the town was $14,757. About 9.8% of families and 16.7% of the population were below the poverty line, including 22.0% of those under age 18 and 25.0% of those age 65 or over.

== Economy ==
Agricultural produce, particularly potato and broccoli farming, is important to the local economy.

== Education ==
Fort Fairfield is part of Maine school administrative district 20.

There are two schools in the district, Fort Fairfield Middle/High School for grades 6 to 12 and Fort Fairfield Elementary School for grades pre-kindergarten to 5.

For the 2011 to 2012 school year, there were approximately 600 students.

== Places and events of interest ==
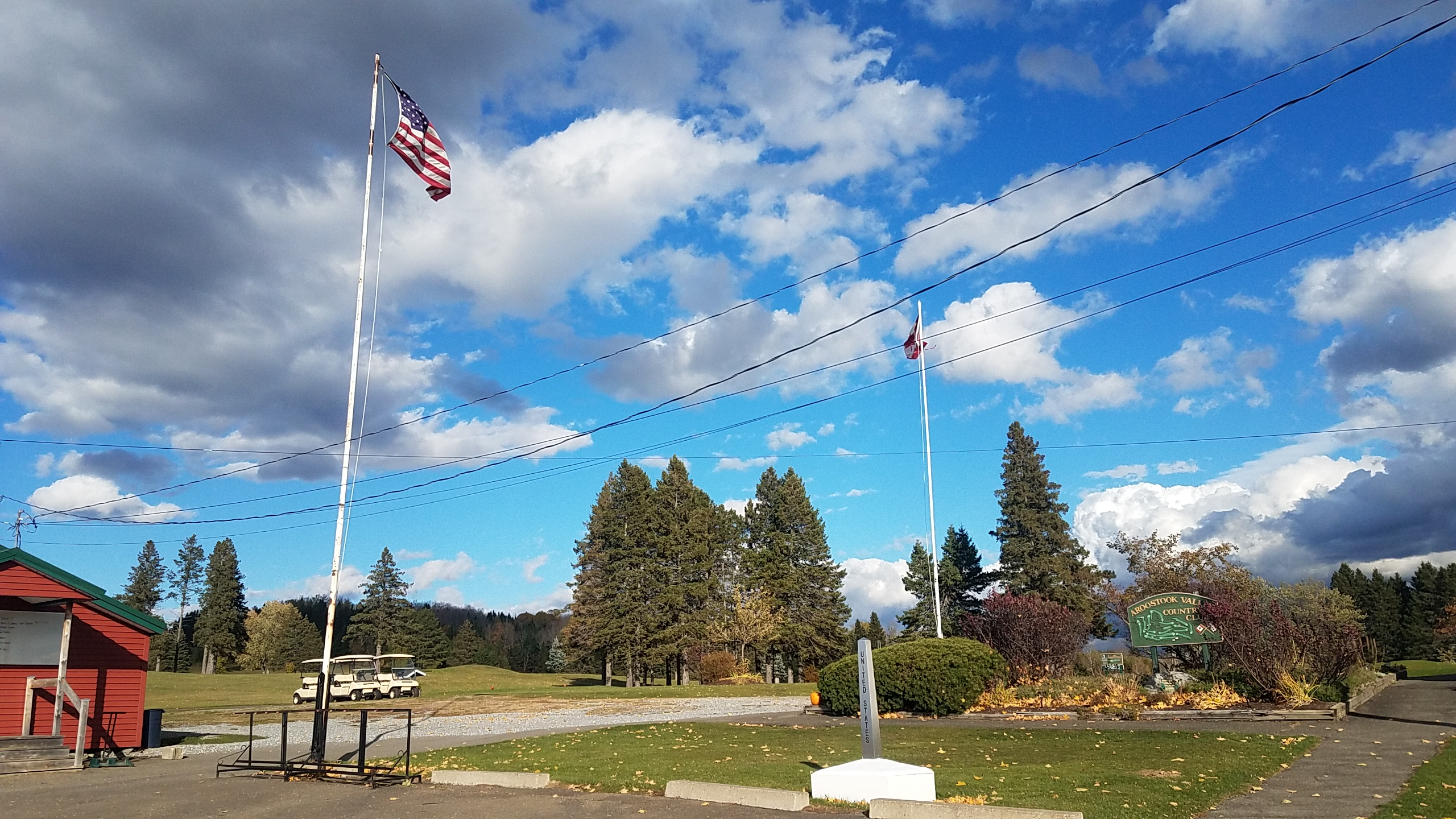
Aroostook Valley Country Club entrance showing US and Canadian flags and border marker

The town contains the Blockhouse Museum, displaying artifacts from the Aroostook War. Just south of Fort Fairfield at Maple Grove is the restored Maple Grove Friends Church, a historic Quaker meeting house built and national historic building built, believed to be the oldest ecclesiastical building in the Fort Fairfield area as well as the northernmost station on the Underground Railroad for people escaping slavery. The annual State of Maine Potato Blossom Festival is held in the third week of July. The town has a public library. A large levee holds back the spring surge of waters from the Aroostook River. The nearest significant shopping center is in Presque Isle, about 11 miles away. The nearby Aroostook Valley Country Club at 234 Russell Road straddles the Maine-New Brunswick border. The entrance is in the U.S., but most of the club's golf course and its clubhouse are in Canada. Until the Covid-19 pandemic, members and their guests, as long as they remain on the club's property, were not required to clear Canadian customs; however, post pandemic, all visitors from the USA must now enter Canada at a formal entry point.

== Notable people ==
- Mark Babin, state legislator
- Sharon Barker, director of the Women's Resource Center at the University of Maine
- Dick Curless, country music singer
- Edward Perrin Edmunds, State Representative and Senator from 1957 to 1964
- Nicholas Fessenden, Secretary of State of Maine from 1891 to 1896
- Stirling Fessenden, chairman and Secretary General of the Shanghai Municipal Council from 1923 to 1939
- Ruth Lockhart, former executive director of the Mabel Sine Wadsworth Women's Health Center, Bangor
- John H. Reed, 66th governor of Maine; chairman of the National Governors Association
- Tim Sample, New England humorist
- Aldric Saucier, American scientist and whistleblower
- Herbert W. Trafton, Speaker of the Maine House of Representatives
