= Aroostook River =

River in New Brunswick, Canada and Maine, USA

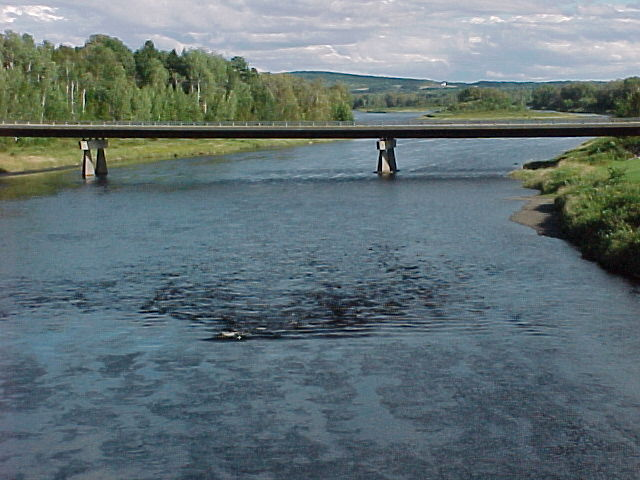
- Aroostook River at Washburn, Maine

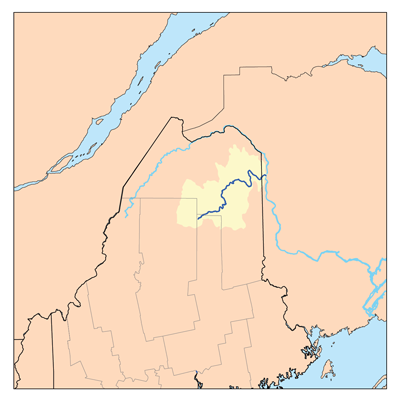
- Aroostook River watershed

Location
- Country: United States, Canada
- State: Maine
- Province: New Brunswick
- Cities: Ashland, Maine, Washburn, Maine, Presque Isle, Maine, Caribou, Maine, Fort Fairfield, Maine

Physical characteristics
- Source confluence: Millinocket Stream and Munsungan Stream
  - location: Maine Township 8, Range 8, WELS, Penobscot County, Maine
  - coordinates: 46.3445°N 68.8011°W
- Mouth: Saint John River (New Brunswick)
  - location: Aroostook, NB
  - coordinates: 46.810123°N 67.71620°W
  - elevation: 330 ft (100 m)
- Length: 112 mi (180 km)
- Basin size: 2,442.7 sq mi (6,327 km^{2})
- Discharge
  - location: Masardis, Maine
  - average: 1,506 cu ft/s (42.6 m^{3}/s)
  - minimum: 41 cu ft/s (1.2 m^{3}/s)
  - maximum: 29,500 cu ft/s (840 m^{3}/s)
- Discharge
  - location: Washburn, Maine
  - average: 2,696 cu ft/s (76.3 m^{3}/s)
  - minimum: 75 cu ft/s (2.1 m^{3}/s)
  - maximum: 49,500 cu ft/s (1,400 m^{3}/s)

The Aroostook River (/əˈruːstək, -ˈrʊs-/ ə-ROO-stək, -RUU-) is a 112-mile-long (180 km) tributary of the Saint John River in the U.S. state of Maine and the Canadian province of New Brunswick. Its basin is the largest sub-drainage of the Saint John River.

The name is derived from the Wolastoqey name Wool-ahs-took, translated by Ganong as "good river for everything". It appears as Arassatuk (DeRozier, 1699).

== History ==
In the late 1830s, the territory comprising the river's drainage area was the scene of the Aroostook War, a boundary dispute between the United States and the United Kingdom, which was ultimately resolved by the Webster–Ashburton Treaty of 1842.

== Geography ==
The river rises in northeastern Maine from the confluence of Millinocket Stream and Munsungan Stream in Maine Township 8, Range 8, WELS, in northern Penobscot County. The river winds east and northeast through Aroostook County. It runs through Ashland, and passes north of Presque Isle and east of Caribou. It joins the Saint John River in Aroostook, New Brunswick, 2 miles (3 km) after crossing the Canada–United States border.

The United States government maintains two river flow gages on the Aroostook. The first is located near Masardis, Maine (46°31′21″N 68°22′23″W) where the rivershed is 892 square miles (2,310 km^{2}). The second is at Washburn, Maine (46°46′36″N 68°09′29″W) where the rivershed is 1,654 square miles (4,280 km^{2}). By Fort Fairfield, Maine the rivershed is 2,301 square miles (5,960 km^{2}). At Masardis, the maximum recorded flow is 29,500 cubic feet per second (840 m^{3}/s) and the minimum 41 cubic feet (1.2 m^{3}) per second. At Washburn, the maximum recorded flow is 49,500 cubic feet (1,400 m^{3}) per second and the minimum 75 cubic feet (2.1 m^{3}) per second. Annual maximum flows occur during the spring snow melt and minimums in the fall. The highest flood levels at both gages occurred during ice-dam induced floods, which occur relatively often on this river. Such flooding occurred in March and April 1999, April and May 2003, and April 2004.

The International Appalachian Trail runs along the river for several miles. Hikers cross the river, pass through customs, and cross the international boundary at Fort Fairfield, Maine.

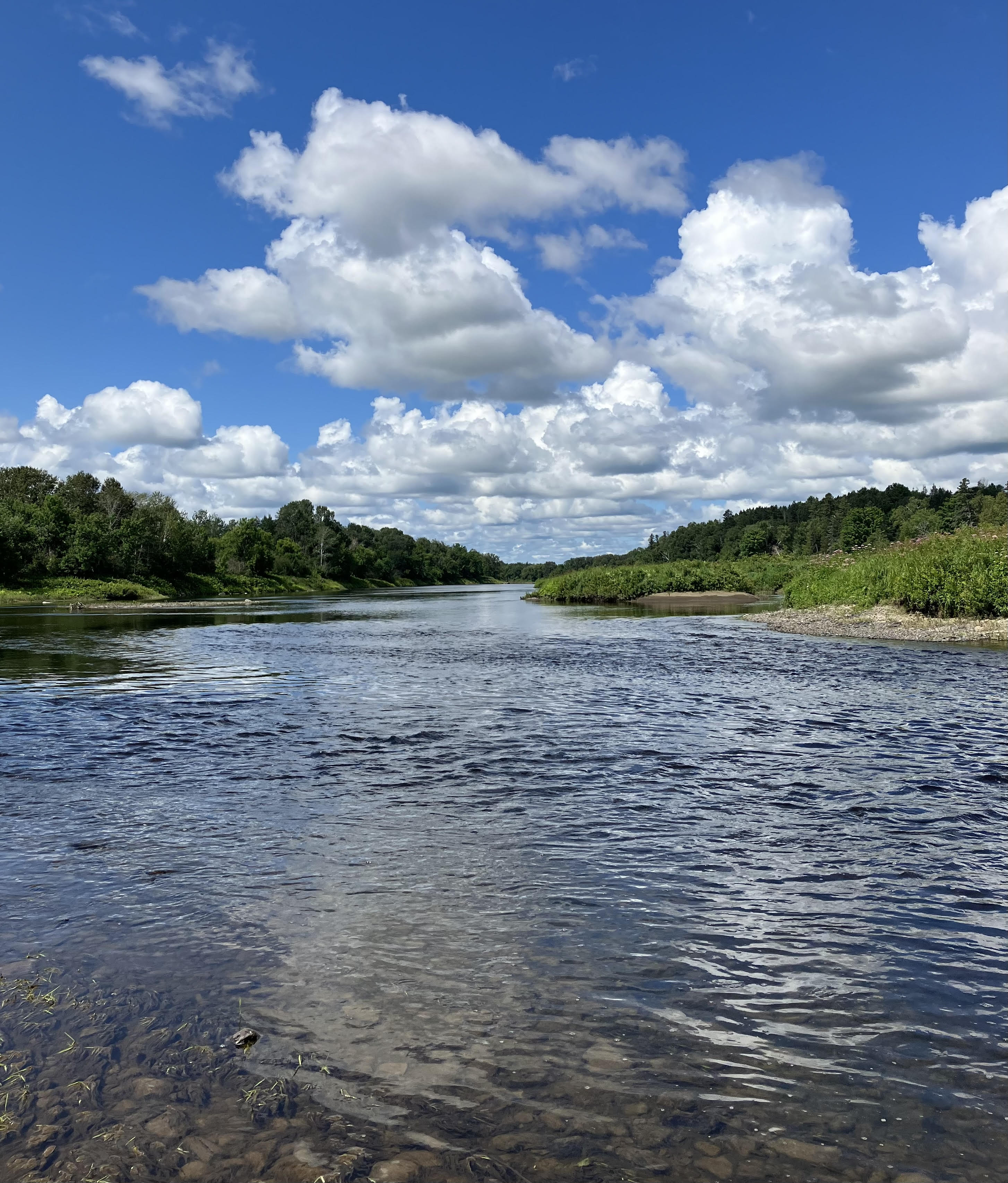
Aroostook River in Presque Isle, Maine, USA in summer.

== Nature ==
The river has a small run of Atlantic salmon. From 1998 to 2001, the number of adults returning to the river ranged from seventeen to thirty.

== See also ==
- List of rivers of Maine
- List of bodies of water of New Brunswick
