= Gordon Parish, New Brunswick =

Gordon
- Parish
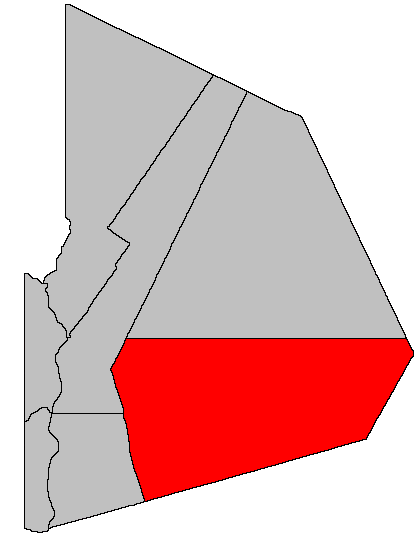
- Location within Victoria County, New Brunswick.
- Coordinates: 46.8375°N 67.3825°W
- Country: Canada
- Province: New Brunswick
- County: Victoria
- Erected: 1864

Area
  - Land: 1,430.19 km^{2} (552.20 sq mi)
- Highest elevation: 651 m (2,136 ft)
- Lowest elevation: 95 m (312 ft)

Population (2021)
  - Total: 1,559
  - Density: 1.1/km^{2} (2.8/sq mi)
  - Change 2016-2021: ▲4.4%
  - Dwellings: 776
- Time zone: UTC-4 (AST)
  - Summer (DST): UTC-3 (ADT)
- Figures do not include portion within the village of Plaster Rock

Gordon is a geographic parish in Victoria County, New Brunswick, Canada.

Prior to the 2023 governance reform, for governance purposes it was divided between the village of Plaster Rock and the local service district of the parish of Gordon, both of which were members of the Western Valley Regional Service Commission (WVRSC).

== Origin of name ==
The parish was named in honour of Arthur Hamilton-Gordon, Lieutenant Governor of New Brunswick at the time.

== History ==
Gordon was erected in 1864 from Grand Falls, Perth, and Saint-Léonard Parishes. Three months later the Carleton County line was restored to its pre-1854 course, removing part of Gordon.

In 1871 all of Gordon north of a line true east and west from the southern end of Long Island in the Tobique River was erected as Lorne Parish.

In 1896 the boundary with Lorne was altered.

== Boundaries ==
Gordon Parish is bounded:

- on the north by a line running true east and west from the foot of an unnamed island downstream of Long Island (Note: The actual wording is "the foot of Long Island" but both cadastral and highway maps show the boundary running south of Long Island. Long Island and the two unnamed islands south of it are all wetlands, so Long Island probably broke up after it was first used as a boundary point in 1871.) in the Tobique River;
- on the northeast by the Northumberland County line;
- on the southeast by the York County line;
- on the south by the Carleton County line;
- on the west by the Royal Road, (Note: The Royal Road is now traceable on maps only by the parish line. The remainder of the Royal Road and similar roads can be seen in an 1878 map of Victoria County.) running a northerly or north-northwesterly course starting on the county line north of Chapmanville at a point about 20.5 kilometres inland from the Saint John River, passing west of Birch Ridge, through Red Rapids, to a point slightly east of the junction of Currie Road with Route 380;
- on the northwest by a line running north 45º east (Note: By the magnet of 1896, when declination in the area was between 20º and 21º west of north. The Territorial Division Act clause referring to magnetic direction bearings was omitted in the 1952 and 1973 Revised Statutes.) about 7 kilometres to meet the northern line of the parish.

== Communities ==
Communities at least partly within the parish. bold indicates an incorporated municipality; italics indicate a name no longer in official use

- Anderson Road
- Anfield
- Arthurette
- Arbuckle
- Beveridge
- Birch Ridge
- Crombie Settlement
- Fraser
- Hazeldean
- Lampedo
- Licford
- Longley
- Lower Anfield
- Mapleview
- McLaughlin
- North View
- Odell
- Picadilly
- **Plaster Rock**
- Red Rapids
- Rowena
- St. Almo (Reeds Island)
- Sisson Ridge
- Summit
- Three Brooks
- Wapske
- Weaver

== Bodies of water ==
Bodies of water (Note: Not including brooks, ponds or coves.) at least partly within the parish.

- River de Chute
- Gulquac River
- Lake Branch River
- Little Gulquac River
- Little Wapske River
- Odell River
- Odelloch River
- Pokoiok River
- North Branch Southwest Miramichi River
- Tobique River
- Tuadook River
- Wapske River
- Lampedo Branch
- more than 20 officially named lakes

== Other notable places ==
Parks, historic sites, and other noteworthy places at least partly within the parish.

- Indian Brook Protected Natural Area
- Oven Rock Brook Protected Natural Area
- Plaster Rock-Renous Wildlife Management Area
- Pokiok River Protected Natural Area

== Demographics ==
Parish population totals do not include Plaster Rock

=== Population ===
**Population trend**

Census	Population	Change (%)
2021	1,559	▲4.4%
2016	1,493	▼4.7%
2011	1,567	▼12.3%
2006	1,786	▼3.1%
2001	1,844	▼6.6%
1996	1,975	▲1.8%
1991	1,940	N/A

=== Language ===
**Mother tongue (2016)**

Language	Population	Pct (%)
English only	1,355	91.2%
French only	115	7.7%
Other languages	10	0.7%
Both English and French	5	0.3%

== See also ==
- List of parishes in New Brunswick
