= Grand Falls Parish, New Brunswick =

Grand Falls
- Parish
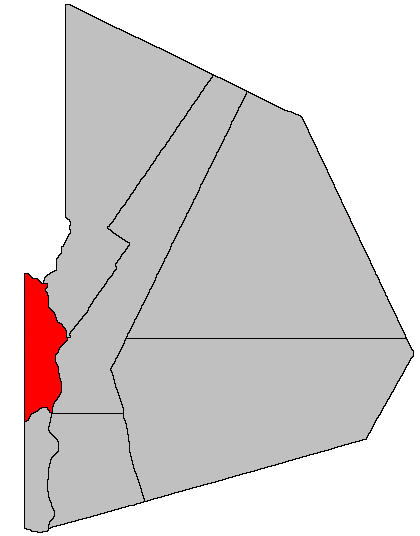
- Location within Victoria County, New Brunswick. map shows pre-1913 boundaries
- Coordinates: 46.935°N 67.74°W
- Country: Canada
- Province: New Brunswick
- County: Victoria
- Erected: 1853

Area
  - Land: 158.09 km^{2} (61.04 sq mi)

Population (2021)
  - Total: 1,077
  - Density: 6.8/km^{2} (18/sq mi)
  - Change 2016-2021: ▼2.9%
  - Dwellings: 488
- Time zone: UTC-4 (AST)
  - Summer (DST): UTC-3 (ADT)
- Figures do not include portion within the town of Grand Falls

Grand Falls is a geographic parish in Victoria County, New Brunswick, Canada; the legal name in French is Grand-Sault, the only parish with different legal English and French names. (Note: Sainte-Marie Parish in Kent County is often written Saint Mary in English but this is not its legal form.)

For governance purposes it is entirely within the town of Grand Falls, which is a member of the Northwest Regional Service Commission.

Prior to the 2023 governance reform, the town of Grand Falls was much smaller in area and the remainder of the parish formed the local service district of the parish of Grand Falls.

The town of Grand Falls is treated separately from the parish in the Territorial Division Act, the only instance of a municipality being separated from a parish. The town's modern municipal boundaries extend well beyond its description in the TDA.

== Origin of name ==
The parish was named for the waterfall located in the modern town of Grand Falls.

== History ==
Grand Falls was erected in 1853 from all of Andover Parish north of the Aroostook River and all of Perth Parish north of a line due east from the northwest angle of the Tobique Indian Reserve. The parish included all or most of Denmark, Drummond, and Lorne Parishes, as well as parts of Gordon and Saint-André Parishes.

In 1862 the boundary with Saint-Léonard Parish was altered.

In 1864 part of Grand Falls was included in the newly erected Gordon Parish, which included Lorne Parish.

In 1872 all of Grand Falls east of the Saint John River was erected as Drummond Parish.

In 1913 Grand Falls Parish was legally separated from the town of Grand Falls.

== Boundaries ==
Grand Falls Parish is bounded:

- on the northeast and east by the Saint John River;
- on the south by the Aroostook River;
- on the west by the American border;
- excluding Grand Falls Town. (Note: This is the only instance in the Territorial Division Act where a town is legally separate from its parish.) Grand Falls Town has much smaller boundaries than the municipality of Grand Falls, containing only the Town Plat of Colebrook, which has Everard H. Daigle Boulevard and Harley Hill Street as its northern and southern boundaries and extends almost as far west as the end of Nowlan Street, and the Stewart Grant, which goes north about twice the distance between Everard H. Daigle Boulevard and Avenue 5ième and extends as far back as the junction of Caswell and Coldbrook Streets.

== Communities ==
- Argosy
- Costigan
- Four Falls
- Gillespie Settlement
- Grand Falls Portage
- Limestone
- Lower California
- Lower Portage
- McCluskey
- Morrell
- Ortonville
- Upper California
- Grand Falls
  - Colebrooke West

== Bodies of water ==
Bodies of water (Note: Not including brooks, ponds or coves.) at least partly in the parish:

- Aroostook River
- Saint John River
  - Rapide de Femme
- Four Falls Stream
- Limestone Stream
- Costigan Lake
- McCullion Lake
- Mud Lake
- Piries Lake
- Round Lake

== Demographics ==
Parish population total does not include portion within Grand Falls

=== Population ===
Population trend

Census	Population	Change (%)
2016	1,109	▼5.4%
2011	1,172	▼1.3%
2006	1,188	▼4.0%
2001	1,238	▲2.2%
1996	1,211	▲4.4%
1991	1,160	N/A

=== Language ===
Mother tongue (2016)

Language	Population	Pct (%)
English only	700	63.4%
French only	385	34.8%
Both English and French	20	1.8%
Other languages	0	0%

== See also ==
- List of parishes in New Brunswick
