= Victoria County, New Brunswick =

County in New Brunswick, Canada

Coordinates: 47°4′30.7″N 67°19′45.8″W

Victoria
- County
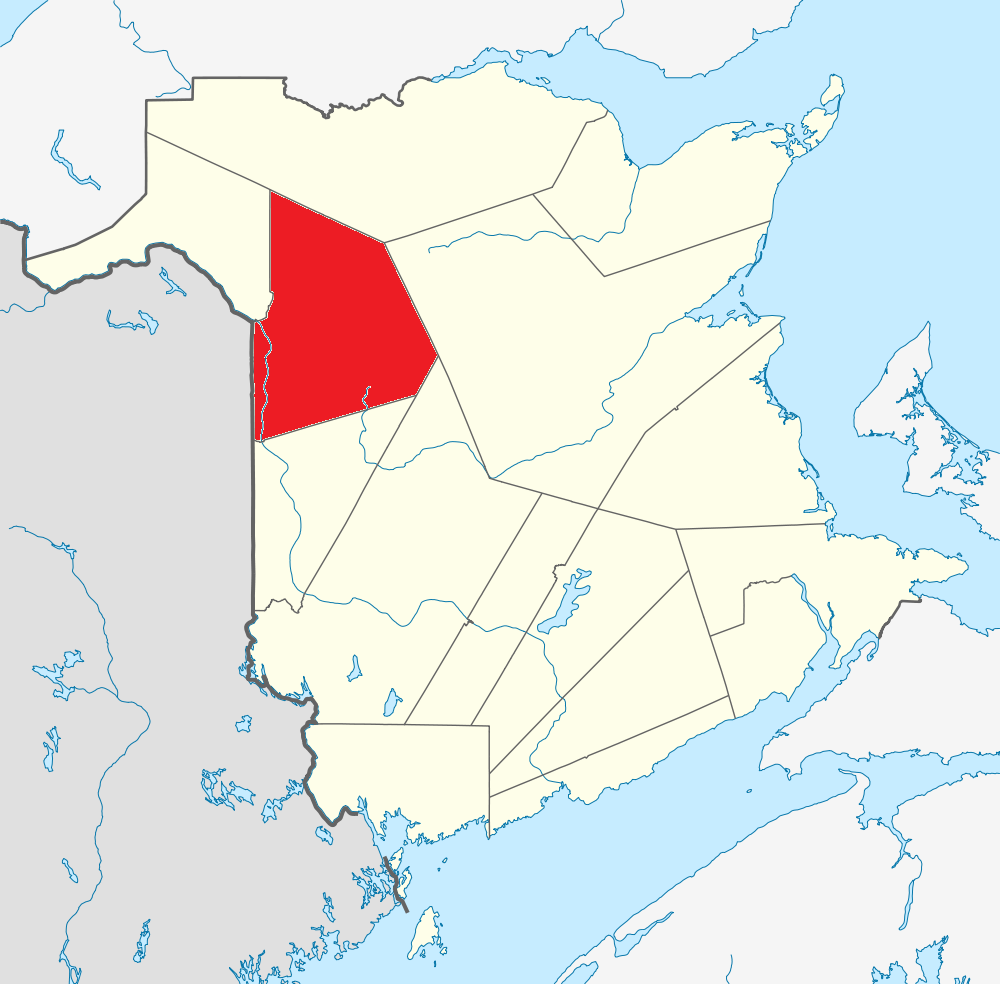
- Location within New Brunswick.
- Country: Canada
- Province: New Brunswick
- Established: 1844
- Shire town: Perth-Andover

Area
  - Land: 5,492.85 km^{2} (2,120.80 sq mi)

Population (2021)
  - Total: 18,312
  - Density: 3.3/km^{2} (8.5/sq mi)
  - Change 2016-2021: ▼1.6%
  - Dwellings: 9,054
- Time zone: UTC-4 (AST)
  - Summer (DST): UTC-3 (ADT)
- Area code: 506

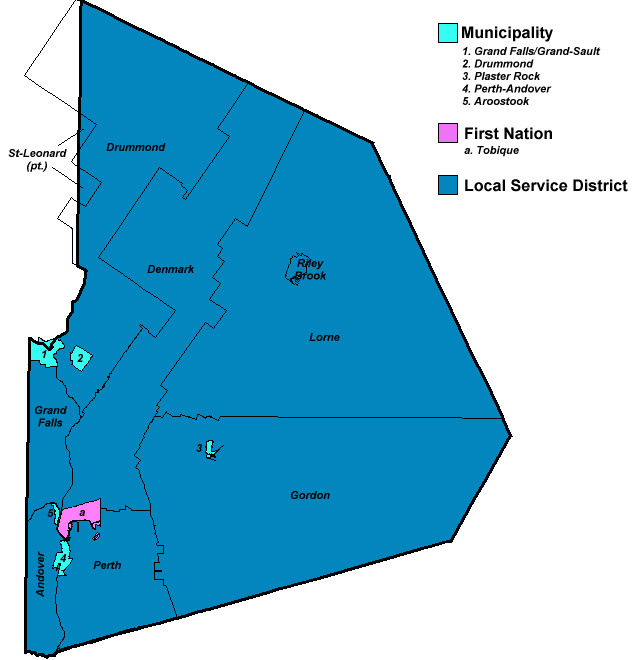
Map of municipal government units in Victoria County.

Victoria County (2021 population 18,312) is located in northwestern New Brunswick, Canada. Farming, especially of potatoes, is the major industry in the county. The area was named for Queen Victoria.

== Census subdivisions ==
=== Communities ===
There are five municipalities within Victoria County (listed by 2016 population):

Official name	Designation	Area km^{2}	Population	Parish
Grand Falls/Grand-Sault	Town	18.09	5,326	Grand Falls
Perth-Andover	Village	8.97	1,590	Perth
Plaster Rock	Village	3.04	1,023	Gordon
Drummond	Village	8.90	737	Drummond
Aroostook	Village	2.23	306	Andover

=== First Nations ===
There is one First Nations reserve in Victoria County (listed by 2016 population):

Official name	Designation	Area km^{2}	Population	Parish
Tobique 20	Reserve	24.98	968	Perth

=== Parishes ===
The county is subdivided into seven parishes (listed by 2016 population):

Official name	Area km^{2}	Population	Municipalities	Unincorporated communities
Drummond	1,014.89	2,157	Drummond (village)	Black Brook / Burgess Settlement / Caldwell / Canton / Davis Mill / Desjardins Road / Ennishone / Hazen / Hennigar Corner / Jardine Brook / McManus Siding / Price Road / Quatre-Coins / Violette Brook / Violette Station
Gordon	1,431.58	1,493	Plaster Rock (village)	Anderson Road / Anfield / Arthurette / Birch Ridge / Bluebell Station / Crombie Settlement / Hazeldean / Maple View / North View / O'Dell / Picadilly / Red Rapids / Rowena / Sisson Ridge / St. Almo / Three Brooks / Wapske / Weaver
Denmark	751.27	1,471		Foley Brook / Lake Edward / Lerwick / New Denmark / North Tilley / Salmonhurst Corner / South Tilley
Grand Falls	158.04	1,109	Grand Falls/Grand-Sault (town)	Argosy / California Settlement / Costigan / Four Falls / Gillespie Settlement / Grand Falls Portage / Kelly Road / Limestone / Lower California / Lower Portage / McCluskey / Morrell Siding / Undine / Upper California
Perth	318.25	1,082	Perth-Andover (village); Tobique 20 (reserve)	Beech Glen / Beech Glen Road / Bon Accord / Caldwell Brook / Currie / Gladwyn / Hillside / Inman / Kilburn / Kincardine / Lower Kintore / Lower Perth / Maliseet / Muniac / Quaker Brook / Red Rapids / Rowena / Tobique Narrows / Upper Kintore
Andover	123.45	891	Aroostook (village)	Bairdsville / Beaconsfield / Carlingford / Dover Hill / Hillandale / Maliseet / River De Chute / Tinker / Turner Settlement
Lorne	1,641.87	464		Blue Mountain Bend / Burntland Brook / Enterprise / Everett / Haley Brook / Lorne / Mapleview / Nictau / North View / Oxbow / Riley Brook / Sisson Brook / Two Brooks / Victoria

== Demographics ==
Historical Census Data - Victoria County, New Brunswick
Year	Pop.	±%
1991	20,786	—
1996	21,929	+5.5%
2001	21,172	−3.5%
2006	20,319	−4.0%
2011	19,921	−2.0%
2016	18,617	−6.5%
2021	18,312	−1.6%

As a census division in the 2021 Census of Population conducted by Statistics Canada, Victoria County had a population of 18,312 living in 8,249 of its 9,054 total private dwellings, a change of −1.6% from its 2016 population of 18,617. With a land area of 5,492.85 km^{2} (2,120.80 sq mi), it had a population density of 3.3/km^{2} (8.6/sq mi) in 2021.

Canada census – Victoria County, New Brunswick community profile

	2016	2011
Population	18,617 (-6.5% from 2011)	19,921 (-2.0% from 2006)
Land area	5,505.56 km^{2} (2,125.71 sq mi)	5,503.93 km^{2} (2,125.08 sq mi)
Population density	3.4/km^{2} (8.8/sq mi)	3.6/km^{2} (9.3/sq mi)
Median age	48.7 (M: 47.9, F: 49.3)	45.2 (M: 44.4, F: 45.9)
Private dwellings	9,178 (total)	9,342 (total)
Median household income	$49,146	$41,435

References: 2016 2011

=== Language ===
Canada Census Mother Tongue - Victoria County, New Brunswick
Census	Total	English			French			English & French			Non-official languages		
Year	Responses	Count	Trend	Pop %	Count	Trend	Pop %	Count	Trend	Pop %	Count	Trend	Pop %
2016	18,365	9,930	▼7.5%	54.07%	7,875	▼6.7%	42.88%	190	Steady	1.00%	370	▲25.2%	2.01%
2011	19,630	10,740	▼0.2%	54.71%	8,405	▼2.2%	42.82%	190	▲90.0%	0.97%	295	▼52.4%	1.50%
2006	20,070	10,760	▼4.7%	53.61%	8,590	▼3.5%	42.80%	100	▼48.7%	0.50%	620	▲18.1%	3.09%
2001	20,915	11,290	▼6.2%	53.98%	8,905	▼0.8%	42.58%	195	▼13.3%	0.93%	525	▲22.1%	2.51%
1996	21,675	12,040	n/a	55.55%	8,980	n/a	41.43%	225	n/a	1.04%	430	n/a	1.98%

Ethnic Groups (2016)

Race	Population	Pct (%)
White	16,190	88.2%
Asian	105	0.6%
Aboriginal	1,920	10.5%
Other	80	0.4%

Religious make-up (2001)

Religion	Population	Pct (%)
Catholic	12,695	60.70%
Protestant	6,170	29.50%
Christian n.i.e.	190	0.91%
Other religions	60	0.29%
No religious affiliation	1,800	8.61%

== Transportation ==
=== Major highways ===
- Route 2 (TCH)
- Route 17
- Route 105
- Route 108
- Route 109
- Route 130
- Route 190
- Route 218
- Route 375
- Route 380
- Route 385
- Route 390
- Route 395
- Route 560

=== Railways ===
The county is crossed by the Canadian National Railway’s mainline Napadogan Subdivision carrying freight and includes the Little Salmon River Trestle, the second largest railway bridge in Canada.

== Notable people ==
Although not everyone in this list was born in Victoria County, they all live or have lived in Victoria County and have had significant connections to the communities.

Full Name	Community	Famous for	Birth	Death	Other
Ron Turcotte	Drummond	Sports	1941		
Wayne Maunder	Four Falls	Actor	1937	2018	

== See also ==
- List of communities in New Brunswick
- Royal eponyms in Canada
