= Tilley, New Brunswick =

Tilley, New Brunswick may refer to:

- Tilley Road, a community in Gloucester County, New Brunswick
- Tilley Settlement, a block of grants straddling the border of Denmark and Perth Parishes in Victoria County, New Brunswick. Modern communities within the block include:
  - North Tilley
  - South Tilley
- Upper Tilley Road, a community in Gloucester County, New Brunswick
