= Limestone (disambiguation) =

Limestone is a sedimentary rock composed predominantly of calcium carbonate (calcite and/or aragonite).

Limestone may also refer to:

== Places ==
=== Australia ===
- Limestone, Queensland, a locality in Rockhampton region
- Limestone, Victoria, a locality in rural Victoria
- Limestone Station, a pastoral lease in New South Wales

=== Canada ===
- Limestone, New Brunswick (disambiguation)
- Little Limestone Lake, Manitoba

=== European Alps ===
- Northern Limestone Alps
- Southern Limestone Alps

=== United States ===
- Limestone, Illinois
- Limestone, Kentucky, former name for the city of Maysville
- Limestone, Maine, a town
  - Limestone (CDP), Maine, a census-designated place in the town of Limestone
- Limestone, Michigan
- Limestone, New York
- Limestone, Oklahoma
- Limestone, Tennessee
- Limestone, West Virginia
- Limestone Creek, Florida
- Limestone Mountain, a summit in West Virginia

== Other uses ==
- Limestone (album), an album by Joe Camilleri and Nicky Bomba
- Limestone University, South Carolina, United States of America

== See also ==
- Limestone Coast (disambiguation)
- Limestone County (disambiguation)
- Limestone Run (disambiguation)
- Limestone Township (disambiguation)
