= Denmark Parish, New Brunswick =

Denmark
- Parish
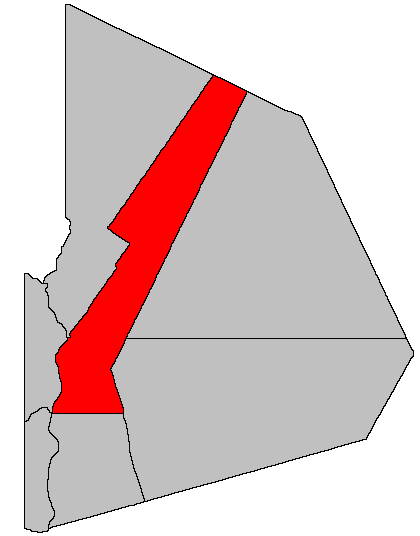
- Location within Victoria County, New Brunswick.
- Coordinates: 47.0°N 67.585°W
- Country: Canada
- Province: New Brunswick
- County: Victoria
- Erected: 1936

Area
  - Land: 751.08 km^{2} (289.99 sq mi)

Population (2021)
  - Total: 1,424
  - Density: 1.9/km^{2} (4.9/sq mi)
  - Change 2016-2021: ▼3.2%
  - Dwellings: 677
- Time zone: UTC-4 (AST)
  - Summer (DST): UTC-3 (ADT)
- Figures do not include portion within the Tobique 20 Indian reserve

Denmark is a geographic parish in Victoria County, New Brunswick, Canada.

Prior to the 2023 governance reform, for governance purposes it was divided between the Indian reserve of Tobique 20 and the local service district of the parish of Denmark, the latter of which was a member of the Northwest Regional Service Commission (NWRSC).

== Origin of name ==
The parish was named for the community of New Denmark.

== History of name ==
Denmark was erected in 1936 from Drummond Parish. Three months later the inland boundary was simplified, returning territory to Drummond.

== Boundaries ==
Denmark Parish is bounded:

- on the northeast by the Restigouche County line, beginning about 5.25 kilometres southeasterly of the end of Chemin Rang 14 and running about 8 kilometres southeasterly;
- on the southeast by a line beginning on the county line and running south 45º west (Note: By the magnet of 1896, when declination in the area was between 20º and 21º west of north. The Territorial Division Act clause referring to magnetic direction bearings was omitted in the 1952 and 1973 Revised Statutes.) to a point slightly east of the junction of Currie Road with Route 380, then running south-southeasterly and southerly along the Royal Road (Note: The Royal Road is now traceable on maps only by the parish line. The remainder of the Royal Road and similar roads can be seen in an 1878 map of Victoria County.) to a point west of Piccadilly;
- on the south by a line running true east from the northwestern corner of the Tobique 20 Indian reserve on the Saint John River;
- on the west by the Saint John River;
- on the northwest by a line beginning on the Saint John River at the southernmost point of a grant to Lyman Whitehead, about 700 metres south of the mouth of the Salmon River, then running northeasterly and northwesterly along the Whitehead grant to the southeastern line of a grant to John King at a point about 75 metres from the Salmon River, then northeasterly along the King grant until it strikes the Salmon River, then upriver past Route 108 to a point opposite the end of the Salmon River Road, on the northwestern line of a grant to Gabriel C. Poitras, then generally northeasterly along the Poitras grant and the northwestern line of Range 3 of the New Denmark North Settlement and its prolongation, passing the end of Sutherland Brook Road and Salmon River, to the southwestern line of the First Tract of lands granted to the New Brunswick Railway Company, then northwesterly and northeasterly along the First Tract and the prolongation of its northwestern line to the starting point on the Restigouche County line.

== Communities ==
Communities at least partly within the parish. bold indicates an Indian reserve; italics indicate a name no longer in official use

- Bell Grove
- Blue Bell Corner
- Currie Road
- Foley Brook
- Hazeldean (Blue Bell)
- Hilldale Corner
- Lake Edward
- Lerwick
- Medford
- New Denmark
- New Denmark Corner
- New Denmark Station
- North Tilley
- **Tobique 20**
- Salmonhurst Corner
- South Tilley

== Bodies of water ==
Bodies of water (Note: Not including brooks, ponds or coves.) at least partly within the parish.

- Little Salmon River
- Left Hand Branch Pokiok River
- Saint John River
- Salmon River
- Sisson Branch
- Back Lake
- Bear Lake
- Blue Bell Lake
- Lake Edward
- Mazerolle Lake
- Merritt Lake
- Pokiok Lake
- Sisson Branch Reservoir

== Other notable places ==
Parks, historic sites, and other noteworthy places at least partly within the parish.

- Pokiok River Protected Natural Area

== Demographics ==
Population totals do not include portion within Tobique 20 Indian reserve

=== Population ===
**Population trend**

Census	Population	Change (%)
2016	1,471	▼7.6%
2011	1,592	▼5.7%
2006	1,688	▼7.9%
2001	1,833	▼1.6%
1996	1,863	▲3.0%
1991	1,808	N/A

=== Language ===
**Mother tongue (2016)**

Language	Population	Pct (%)
English only	1,045	71.1%
French only	365	24.8%
Other languages	40	2.7%
Both English and French	20	1.4%

== See also ==
- List of parishes in New Brunswick
