= Plaster Rock, New Brunswick =

Former village in Canada

Plaster Rock
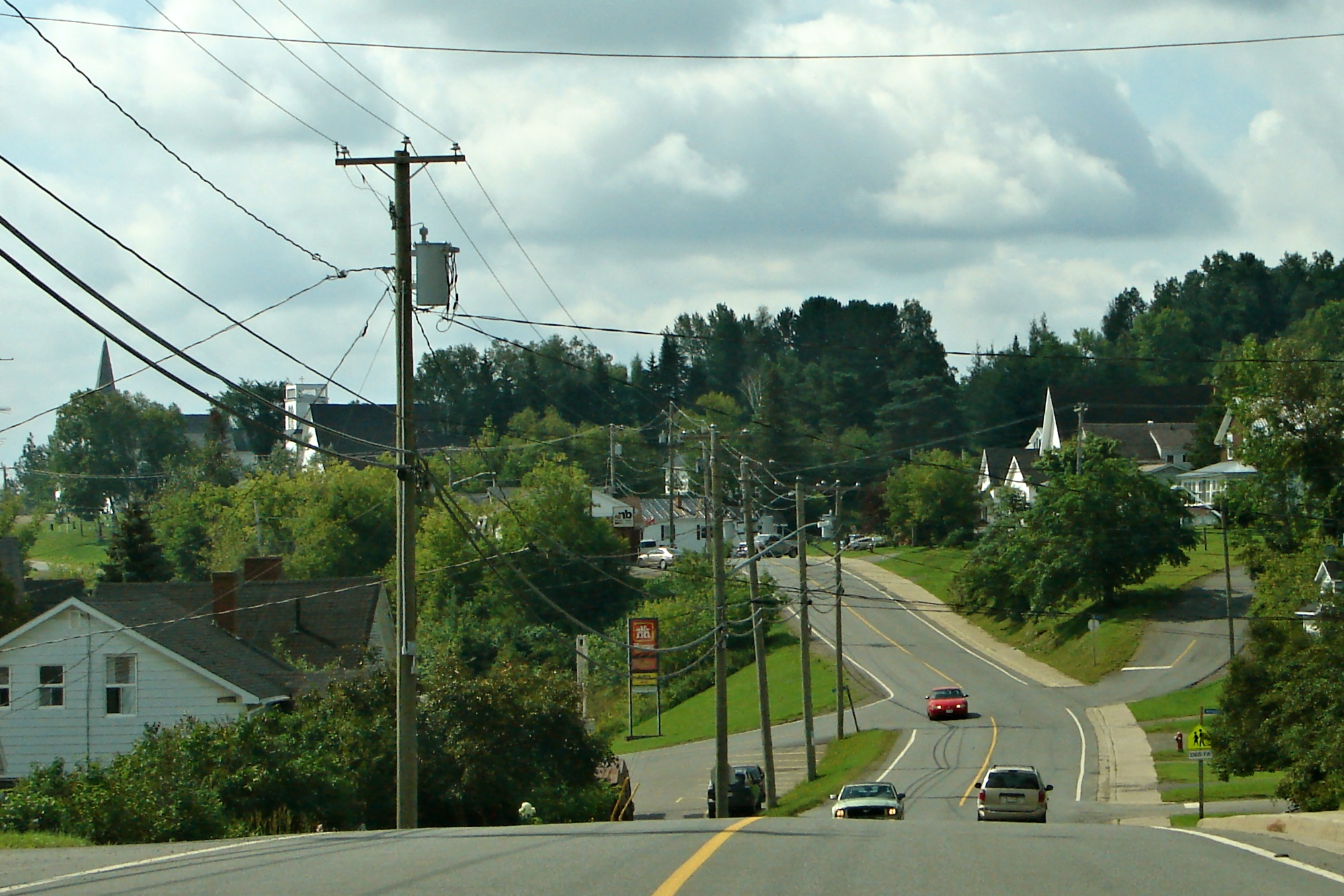

- Location within New Brunswick.
- Coordinates: 46°53′N 67°23′W
- Country: Canada
- Province: New Brunswick
- County: Victoria
- Parish: Gordon
- Municipality: Tobique Valley
- Founded: 1881

Area
  - Land: 3.01 km^{2} (1.16 sq mi)

Population (2021)
  - Total: 1,002
  - Density: 332.9/km^{2} (862/sq mi)
  - Change 2016–21: ▼2.1%
  - Dwellings: 515
- Time zone: UTC-4 (AST)
  - Summer (DST): UTC-3 (ADT)
- Postal code(s): E7G
- Area code: 506
- Website: www.plasterrockvillage.com

Plaster Rock is a former village in Victoria County, New Brunswick. It is now part of the village of Tobique Valley.

== History ==
Plaster Rock’s first settlers were Hezekiah Day and his two brothers, who arrived in 1881. Plaster Rock was incorporated as the Village of Plaster Rock on November 9, 1966. Hezekiah Day gave Plaster Rock its name based on the hill on the other side of the Tobique River – the rock is made up of gypsum, or plaster.

The second settlers, Mr. & Mrs. Henry Ridgewell, arrived in 1882. The third settler was a gentleman named David Roulston and his family.

Primarily English, the town is historically a logging and lumbering community. Known as the Gateway to Mount Carleton Provincial Park, the community is the source of business, commerce, banking, grocery shopping, and religious and sport gatherings for the surrounding hamlets and homes of the Tobique River region. The Tobique River, which has its source Nictau Lake at Mt. Carleton Provincial Park, flows through the tiny communities of Nictau, Riley Brook, Oxbow, Plaster Rock, Arthurette, Red Rapids, and empties into the Saint John River above Perth-Andover.

The Tobique First Nations Reserve is located where the Tobique and Saint John Rivers come together. The town has 6 churches, namely a Catholic Church, an Anglican Church, a Free-will Baptist Church, a United Baptist Church, a United Church of Canada, and a Pentecostal Church. The average congregation is 20-45 members of the first 5 churches, with the Pentecost church being an exception with a congregation of approximately 400 members, who are in part from the village of Plaster Rock, but mostly from the surrounding region of Victoria County. The Pentecostal Church also has its own private school, the only other school in the village aside from the village`s Public Junior and High Schools.

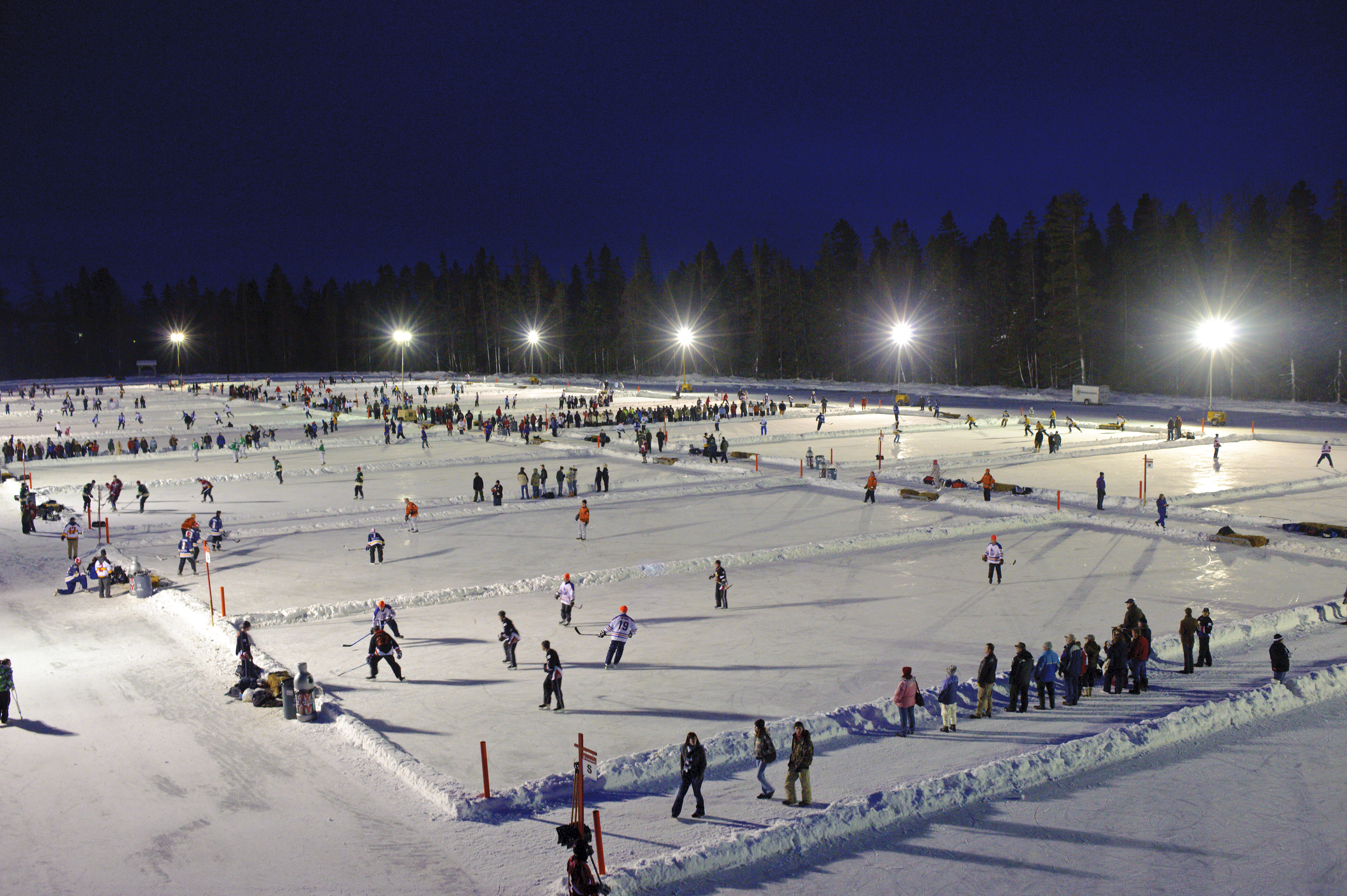
The World Pond Hockey Championship has been held every year in Plaster Rock since 2002

Plaster Rock is home of the World Pond Hockey Championships, which take place annually in February on Roulston Lake, featuring 120 teams from around the world. In 2016 Wayne Gretzky attended the event and Budweiser introduced its 20-metre goal-light as it began its trek across Canada and eventually to the North Pole.

In June, Fiddlers on The Tobique is a large event attracting tourists and visitors from all over the world as they put approximately 1300 canoes into the waters and float accompanied by fiddlers and their Maritime music.

Plaster Rock gets a rebroadcasting signal of CIKX-FM, and is heard at the frequency of 88.3 MHz.

On 1 January 2023, Plaster Rock annexed all or part of three local service districts to form the new village of Tobique Valley. The community's name remains in official use.

=== January 2014 Derailment of HAZMAT Train ===
On January 7, 2014, 17 cars of a 122-car train derailed and caused a huge fireball near Plaster Rock. The petroleum products originated in Western Canada and were destined for the Irving Oil Refinery in Saint John, New Brunswick, because in the wake of the Lac Megantic derailment the MM&A line through Lac Megantic can no longer be used to transport dangerous goods. As a result, Irving Oil uses the CN line from Montreal through Quebec City that crosses over the bridge to the South shore through Rimouski and Matane and then through Plaster Rock to Saint John. Nobody was injured during the blaze but about 150 people were evacuated.

== Demographics ==
Historical Census Data - Plaster Rock, New Brunswick
Year	Pop.	±%
2006	1,150	—
2011	1,135	−1.3%
2016	1,023	−9.9%
2021	1,002	−2.1%

In the 2021 Census of Population conducted by Statistics Canada, Plaster Rock had a population of 1,002 living in 476 of its 515 total private dwellings, a change of −2.1% from its 2016 population of 1,023. With a land area of 3.01 km^{2} (1.16 sq mi), it had a population density of 332.9/km^{2} (862.2/sq mi) in 2021.

== See also ==
- List of communities in New Brunswick
