= Limestone Coast (disambiguation) =

Limestone Coast is a state government region in South Australia

Limestone Coast may also refer to the following:

- Limestone Coast local service area, a SAPOL organisational unit - refer South Australia Police#Local service areas in South Australia
- Limestone Coast Tourism Region, a tourism industry region - refer Regions of South Australia#Tourist regions
- Limestone Coast zone (wine), a wine zone in South Australia
- Limestone Coast Railway, a defunct tourist railway in South Australia

== See also ==
- Limestone (disambiguation)
- Limestone County (disambiguation)
- Limestone Run (disambiguation)
- Limestone Township (disambiguation)
