= Tillie =

Tillie may refer to:

== Places in the United States ==
- Tillie, Kentucky, an unincorporated community
- Tillie, Pennsylvania, a former populated place
- Tillie Creek, California

== People ==
- Tillie (name), a given name and surname

== Animal ==
- Tillie (elephant), elephant in the John Robinson Circus

== Other uses ==
- Tropical Storm Tillie, in the 1964 Pacific hurricane season
- Tillie (murals), two murals (or one mural with two sides) in New Jersey
- Tillie the All-Time Teller, an ATM run by the First National Bank of Atlanta
- Tillie (film), a 1922 film directed by Frank Urson

== See also ==
- Tilly (disambiguation)
- Tilley (disambiguation)
