= New Brunswick Route 385 =

Highway in New Brunswick, Canada

Coordinates: 47.256398°N 67.129898°W

Route 385

Route information
- Maintained by New Brunswick Department of Transportation
- Length: 88 km (55 mi)

Major junctions
- North end: Route 180 in Mount Carleton Provincial Park
- South end: Route 109 in Tobique Valley

Location
- Country: Canada
- Province: New Brunswick
- Major cities: Nictau, Riley Brook, Blue Mountain Brook, Two Brooks, Everett, Oxbow, Burntland Brook, Sisson Brook, Mapleview

Highway system
- Provincial highways in New Brunswick; Former routes
| ← Route 380 | → Route 390 |

Route 385 is a 88-kilometre (55 mi) long mostly north-south secondary highway in the northwest portion of New Brunswick, Canada.

The route's North-Eastern terminus starts at the northern entrance of Mount Carleton Provincial Park. The road travels south through Mount Carleton Provincial Park following the Tobique River south-west to the community of Nictau. The road continues south continuing to follow the Tobique River to the community of Riley Brook, then Blue Mountain Brook which is across the river from the Blue Mountain Natural Protected Area then passing through Two Brooks. The road continues south passing the communities of Everett, Oxbow, Burntland Brook, Sisson Brook, Mapleview, Weaver before ending in the village of Tobique Valley where the highway is known as Main Street ending at Route 108 and Route 109 intersection.

== Intersecting routes ==
- None
