= New Brunswick Route 109 =

Highway in New Brunswick, Canada

Route 109

Route information
- Maintained by New Brunswick Department of Transportation
- Length: 35.94 km (22.33 mi)
- Existed: 1965–present

Major junctions
- West end: Route 105 in Perth-Andover
- East end: Route 108 in Tobique Valley

Location
- Country: Canada
- Province: New Brunswick

Highway system
- Provincial highways in New Brunswick; Former routes
← Route 108	→ Route 110

Route 109 is a highway in New Brunswick, Canada; Its western terminus starts along the Tobique River on Route 105 in Perth-Andover. The route travels east where the route is known as Gulch Road passing through Craig Flats, Quaker Brook and Currie where it begins following the Tobique River again. The route then passes through Licford and Arthurette where it crosses the Tobique River briefly merging with Route 390 from the south side to the north side continuing to follow the river east. The route passes by Picadilly then passes by eastern terminus of Route 380 in Saint Almo. The route continues through Three Brooks and the western terminus of Route 395, then passes Ox Island entering Linton Corner where the route is now known as Main Street as it enters Tobique Valley. The route ends at the intersection of Route 108 and Route 385 near Roulston Lake, a distance of 35.9 kilometres.

== History ==
From its original assignment in 1965 until the 1997 opening of the Route 108 Tobique Valley bypass, to which Route 109 is connected; the route followed the south bank entirely, while Route 390 followed the north bank. Route 109 also formerly extended along the Tobique Valley-Renous highway, although it was redesignated as part of Route 108 in 1976.

== See also ==
- List of New Brunswick provincial highways
