= Kintore =

Kintore may refer to:

== Places ==
=== Australia ===
- Kintore, Northern Territory
- Kintore, Western Australia
- Kintore Avenue, a street in South Australia
- County of Kintore, South Australia

=== Canada ===
- Kintore, Ontario
- Lower Kintore, New Brunswick
- Upper Kintore, New Brunswick

=== Scotland ===
- Kintore, Aberdeenshire

== Other uses ==
- Kintore (Parliament of Scotland constituency)
- Earl of Kintore
