= Kintore, New Brunswick =

Kintore may refer to two different communities in the Canadian province of New Brunswick:

- Lower Kintore, New Brunswick
- Upper Kintore, New Brunswick
