= Lorne Parish, New Brunswick =

Lorne
- Parish
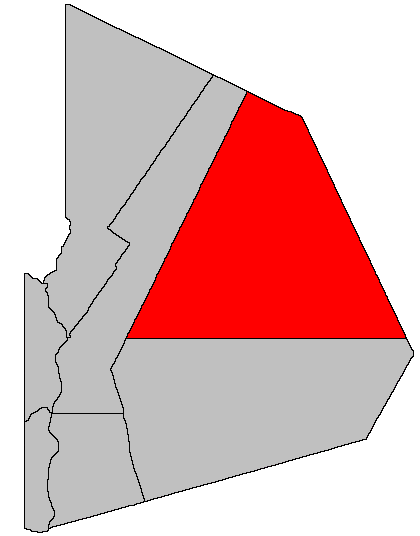
- Location within Victoria County, New Brunswick.
- Coordinates: 47.1175°N 67.12°W
- Country: Canada
- Province: New Brunswick
- County: Victoria
- Erected: 1871

Area
  - Land: 1,632.21 km^{2} (630.20 sq mi)

Population (2021)
  - Total: 313
  - Density: 0.2/km^{2} (0.52/sq mi)
  - Change 2016-2021: ▼32.5%
  - Dwellings: 337
- Time zone: UTC-4 (AST)
  - Summer (DST): UTC-3 (ADT)

Lorne is a geographic parish in Victoria County, New Brunswick, Canada.

Prior to the 2023 governance reform, for governance purposes it was divided between the local service districts of Riley Brook and the parish of Lorne, both of which were members of the Western Valley Regional Service Commission (WVRSC).

== Origin of name ==
The parish was named for the Marquess of Lorne, recently married to The Princess Louise, daughter of Queen Victoria. Lorne was later Governor General of Canada.

== History ==
Lorne was erected in 1871 from Gordon Parish.

In 1896 the northwestern boundary was altered from running north-northeast to running northeast.

== Boundaries ==
Lorne Parish is bounded:

- on the northeast by the Restigouche County line, beginning about 1.5 kilometres northwesterly of O'Dare Brook and running southeasterly;
- on the east by the Northumberland County line, running about 50 kilometres south-southeasterly from the meeting point of the Restigouche, Northumberland, and Victoria County lines;
- on the south by a line running true east and west from the foot of an unnamed island downstream of Long Island (Note: The actual wording is "the foot of Long Island" but both cadastral and highway maps show the boundary running south of Long Island. Long Island and the two unnamed islands south of it are all wetlands, so Long Island probably broke up after it was first used as a boundary point in 1871.) in the Tobique River;
- on the northwest by a line running north 45º east (Note: By the magnet of 1896, when declination in the area was between 20º and 21º west of north. The Territorial Division Act clause referring to magnetic direction bearings was omitted in the 1952 and 1973 Revised Statutes.) from a point about 1.35 kilometres east of Blue Bell Lake and 750 metres north of Route 108 near Crombie Settlement to the starting point.

== Communities ==
Communities at least partly within the parish.

- Blue Mountain Bend
- Burntland Brook
- Enterprise
- Everett
- Mapleview
- Nictau
- North View
- Oxbow
- Riley Brook
- Sisson Brook
- Two Brooks

== Bodies of water ==
Bodies of water (Note: Not including brooks, ponds or coves.) at least partly within the parish.

- River Dee
- River Don
- Gulquac River
- Little Gulquac River
- Little Tobique River
- Mamozekel River
- Salmon River
- Serpentine River
- Tobique River
- Sisson Branch
- Trousers Lake
  - Left Hand Leg
  - Right Hand Leg
- Sisson Branch Reservoir
- more than thirty other officially named lakes

== Islands ==
Islands at least partly within the parish.

- Balm of Gilead Island
- Campbell Island
- Diamond Island
- Gulquac Island
- Horse Island
- Long Island
- Oxbow Island

== Other notable places ==
Parks, historic sites, and other noteworthy places at least partly within the parish.

- Blue Mountain Protected Natural Area
- Nictau Airstrip
- Nictau Protected Natural Area
- Plaster Rock-Renous Wildlife Management Area

== Demographics ==
=== Population ===
Population trend

| Census | Population | Change (%) |
|---|---|---|
| 2021 | 313 | ▼32.5% |
| 2016 | 464 | ▼10.4% |
| 2011 | 518 | ▼16.0% |
| 2006 | 617 | ▼0.8% |
| 2001 | 622 | ▼9.5% |
| 1996 | 687 | ▼2.3% |
| 1991 | 703 | N/A |

=== Language ===
Mother tongue (2016)

| Language | Population | Pct (%) |
|---|---|---|
| English only | 400 | 86.0% |
| French only | 60 | 12.9% |
| Both English and French | 0 | 0% |
| Other languages | 5 | 1.1% |

== See also ==
- List of parishes in New Brunswick
