= Perth Parish, New Brunswick =

Perth
- Parish
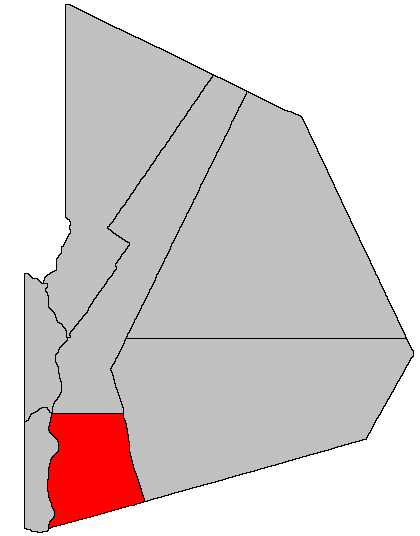
- Location within Victoria County, New Brunswick.
- Coordinates: 46.69°N 67.62°W
- Country: Canada
- Province: New Brunswick
- County: Victoria
- Erected: 1833

Area
  - Land: 318.10 km^{2} (122.82 sq mi)

Population (2021)
  - Total: 1,047
  - Density: 3.3/km^{2} (8.5/sq mi)
  - Change 2016-2021: ▼3.2%
  - Dwellings: 560
- Time zone: UTC-4 (AST)
  - Summer (DST): UTC-3 (ADT)
- Figures do not include portions within the village of Perth-Andover and the Tobique 20 Indian reserve

Perth is a geographic parish in Victoria County, New Brunswick, Canada.

Prior to the 2023 governance reform, for governance purposes it was divided between the village of Perth-Andover, the Indian reserve of Tobique 20, and the local service district of the parish of Perth. The village and LSD were both members of the Western Valley Regional Service Commission (WVRSC).

== Origin of name ==
Sir Archibald Campbell, then Lieutenant Governor of New Brunswick, was born at Glen Lyon, Perthshire, Scotland. Another possible origin is that local Scotch settlers named it for the city of Perth, Scotland.

== History ==
Perth was erected in 1833 in Carleton County from Kent Parish. The parish included all of modern Victoria County east of the Saint John River and south of the Grand Falls.

In 1850 Victoria County was erected from Carleton County; the new county line ran through Perth, removing part of the parish.

In 1853 all of Perth north of the Tobique Indian Reserve was included in the newly erected Grand Falls Parish.

In 1854 the county line was moved to the pre-1850 southern line of Perth.

In 1864 the eastern part of Perth was included in the newly erected Gordon Parish. Three months later the pre-1854 county line was restored.

== Boundaries ==
Perth Parish is bounded:

- on the north by a line running true east from the northwestern corner of the Tobique 20 Indian reserve on the Saint John River;
- on the east by the Royal Road, (Note: The Royal Road is now traceable on maps only by the parish line. The remainder of the Royal Road and similar roads can be seen in an 1878 map of Victoria County.) starting about 14.5 kilometres inland and running southerly or south-southeasterly along a path passing west of Birch Ridge, through Red Rapids, to the Carleton County line north of Chapmanville;
- on the south by the Carleton County line;
- on the west by the Saint John River.

== Communities ==
Communities at least partly within the parish. bold indicates an incorporated municipality or Indian reserve; italics indicate a name no longer in official use

- Beech Glen
- Bon Accord
- Currie
- Gladstone
- Gladwyn
- Hillside (Caldwell Brook)
- Inman
- Kilburn
- Kincardine
- Lower Kintore
- Lower Perth
- Muniac
- **Perth-Andover**
- Quaker Brook
- Red Rapids
- Rowena
- **Tobique 20**
  - Maliseet
- Tobique Narrows
- Upper Kintore

== Bodies of water ==
Bodies of water (Note: Not including brooks, ponds or coves.) at least partly within the parish.

- Pokiok River
- Saint John River
- Tobique River
- Monquart Stream
- Muniac Stream
- Larlee Creek
- Mud Lake

== Other notable places ==
Parks, historic sites, and other noteworthy places at least partly within the parish.

- Blind Gully Brook Protected Natural Area
- Pokiok River Protected Natural Area
- Porcupine Mountain Protected Natural Area
- Tobique Narrows Dam

== Demographics ==
Parish population total does not include Tobique 20 Indian reserve and portion within Perth-Andover

=== Population ===
**Population trend**

Census	Population	Change (%)
2016	1,082	▼1.3%
2011	1,096	▼12.9%
2006	1,259	▼2.3%
2001	1,288	▼3.5%
1996	1,335	▲1.8%
1991	1,311	N/A

=== Language ===
**Mother tongue (2016)**

Language	Population	Pct (%)
English only	995	92.1%
French only	65	6.0%
Other languages	15	1.4%
Both English and French	5	0.5%

== See also ==
- List of parishes in New Brunswick
