= Robert Nielsen =

Canadian journalist (1922–2009)

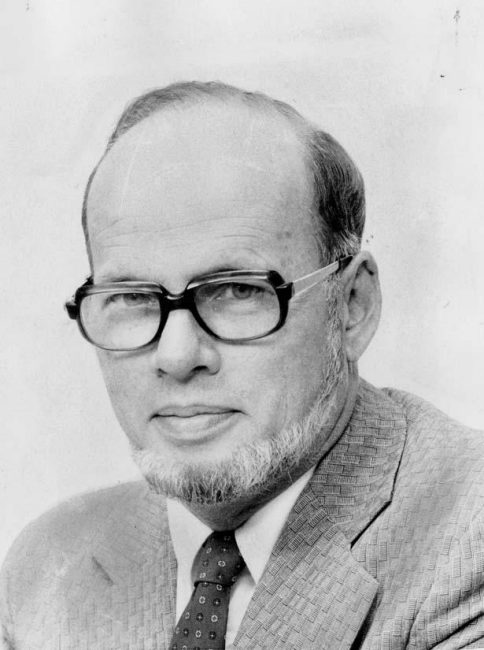
- Born: June 24, 1922; Plaster Rock, New Brunswick, Canada
- Died: July 10, 2009 (aged 87); Perth-Andover, New Brunswick, Canada

Robert Fredsø Nielsen (1922–2009) was a Canadian journalist who is known for his time with the Toronto Star. Nielsen was employed by the newspaper for 33 years and served in several capacities, including as a correspondent, foreign correspondent, chief editorial writer, editorial page editor, investigative reporter and editorial page columnist.

Born in Plaster Rock, New Brunswick, to Danish immigrants Hans and Camilla Nielsen. He led New Brunswick in high school entrance examinations in 1936 and won a Lord Beaverbrook scholarship to the University of New Brunswick in 1940.

He left UNB in 1943 to join the Canadian Press in Toronto, where he received basic training in editing and writing for newspapers. In 1945, he began a 33-year career with the Toronto Star during which he was successively a general reporter, Parliamentary correspondent, chief editorial writer, editorial page editor, foreign correspondent based in London and Washington, acting editor-in-chief and editorial page columnist. Some of his foreign assignments included South Africa's racial conflict, the erection of the Berlin Wall in 1961, Sweden's welfare state, Israel's in-gathering of Jews and the refugee influx to Hong Kong from Communist China. Nielsen was awarded a Nieman Fellowship to Harvard University in 1952 and a National Newspaper Award for Enterprise Reporting (now categorized as Investigations) in 1974.

While on vacation in New Brunswick in 1965, Nielsen learned that a ratepayers' meeting had voted to expel all 45 Malecite children from a Perth-Andover school—for no more substantial reason than their race. His reports to the Toronto Star led to national publicity and a second, much larger meeting of rate-payers who voted by a big majority to readmit the children.

Robert Nielsen left the Star in 1978 and moved to the Perth-Andover, New Brunswick area where he continued his career as a freelance writer and pursued part-time studies at the University of Maine at Presque Isle, graduating with a Bachelor of Liberal Studies in 1990. During this time, Nielsen was a columnist for the Telegraph-Journal of Saint John, New Brunswick and also for Influence magazine. He died at age 87 after suffering an aneurysm.
