= Tilley =

Tilley may refer to:

== Places ==
- Tilley, Alberta, a village in Canada
- Tilley Settlement, a block of land grants in Victoria County, New Brunswick, comprising several modern communities
  - North Tilley, New Brunswick, formerly called Tilley
  - South Tilley, New Brunswick
- Tilley, Shropshire, a village in England
- Tilley, Western Australia, a small railway siding and future junction

== Other uses ==
- Tilley (surname), people with the surname Tilley
- Tilley's, a café in Canberra, Australia
- Tilley Endurables, a Canadian hat company.
- Tilley Swamp, South Australia, a locality

== See also ==
- Tilley lamp, a kerosene lamp
