= New Brunswick Route 108 =

Highway in New Brunswick

Route 108

Route information
- Maintained by New Brunswick Department of Transportation
- Length: 202.94 km (126.10 mi)
- Existed: 1965–present

Major junctions
- West end: Route 2 (TCH) / Route 255 in Grand Falls
- Route 144 / Route 130 / Route 105 in Grand Falls; Route 109 in Tobique Valley; Route 8 in Renous-Quarryville
- East end: Route 8 / Route 420 in Derby Junction

Location
- Country: Canada
- Province: New Brunswick
- Major cities: Drummond, Tobique Valley, Renous-Quarryville

Highway system
- Provincial highways in New Brunswick; Former routes
| ← Route 107 | → Route 109 |

Route 108 is a highway in New Brunswick, Canada; running from Trans-Canada Highway exit 75 near Grand Falls to Route 8 exit 163 at Derby Junction (near Miramichi); a distance of 202.9 kilometres.

== Routing ==
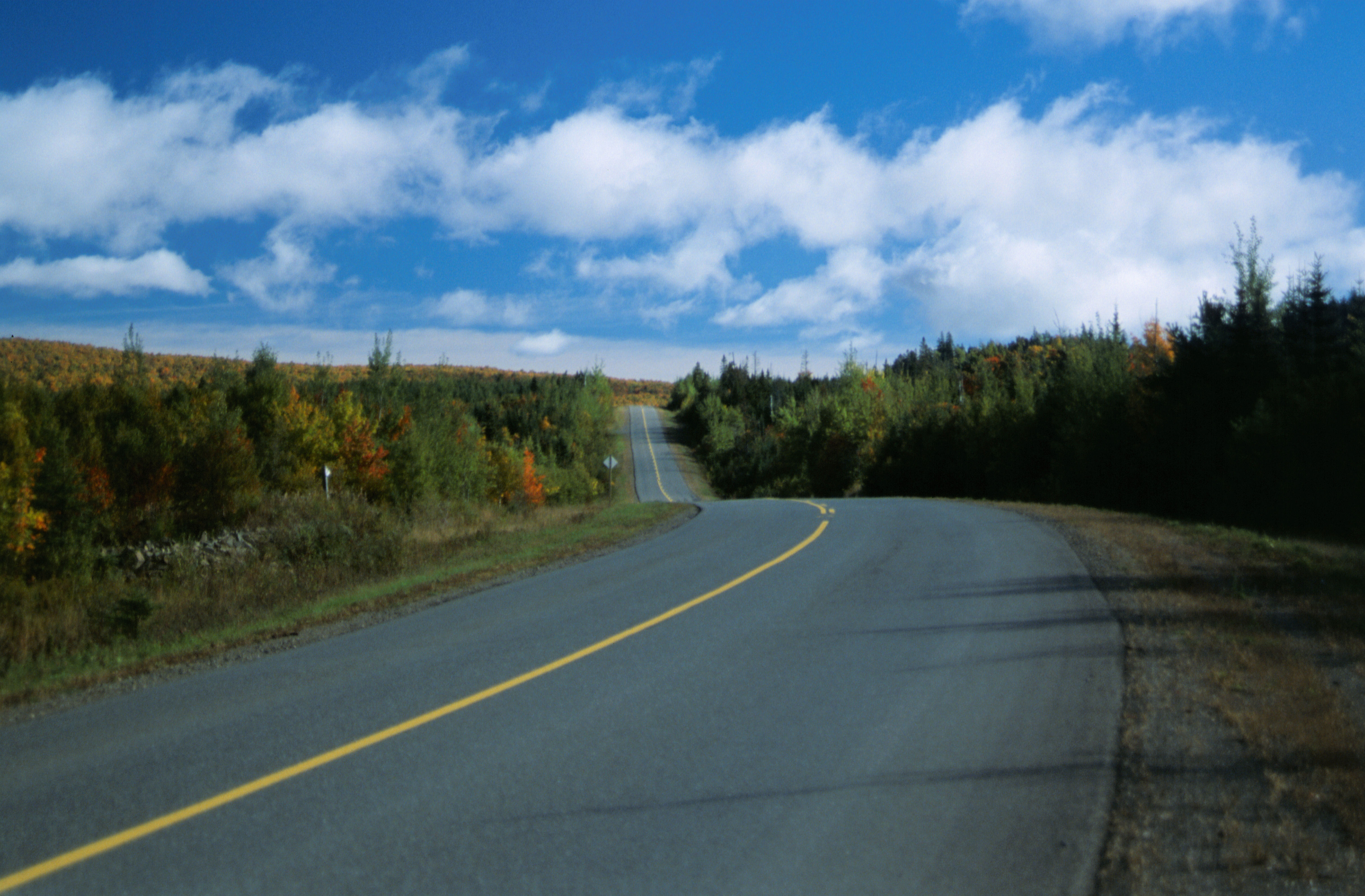
The New Brunswick Route 108

From the northern terminus on the Trans-Canada Highway, Exit 75, the route loops around passing the eastern terminus of Route 144. Route 108 follows an access road built in 2003 to the former Trans-Canada Highway, then runs southeast along its old alignment to the edge of the town of Grand Falls. The road passes through the town as "Madawaska Road", passing the Grand Falls Generating Station, then the northern terminus of Route 130, and leaves along Tobique Road, then Toners Renous Road passing the Eastern Terminus of Route 105. Route 108 continues southeast through Drummond and New Denmark, Blue Bell and Hazeldean. From here, the route passes through Crombie Settlement, and Sisson Ridge then comes to a 4-way intersection at the northern outskirts of Tobique Valley with the southern terminus of Route 385. The route follows a bypass route to the south, reaching another 4-way intersection at the Route 109 junction at the south end of town.

Route 108 runs east passing the northern terminus of Route 390 from Tobique Valley on the Plaster Rock-Renous Highway, a 137-kilometre road, completed in the late 1960s, through entirely uninhabited forest land that is mostly owned by J.D. Irving Limited. There are no facilities or public buildings along the route, and signs warn of "winter conditions".

As the route travels towards Renous-Quarryville, it passes the southern terminus of Route 420, the route follows the Renous River as it passes through Grainfield, North Renous and then finally Renous-Quarryville coming to an interchange with Route 8, and turns northeast passing the southern terminus of Route 415 in Renous-Quarryville. The route passes through Elmtree, Upper Derby, Bryenton along a former Route 8 alignment through Derby and Millerton to its eastern end at Derby Junction at Route 8 and Route 420.

== History ==
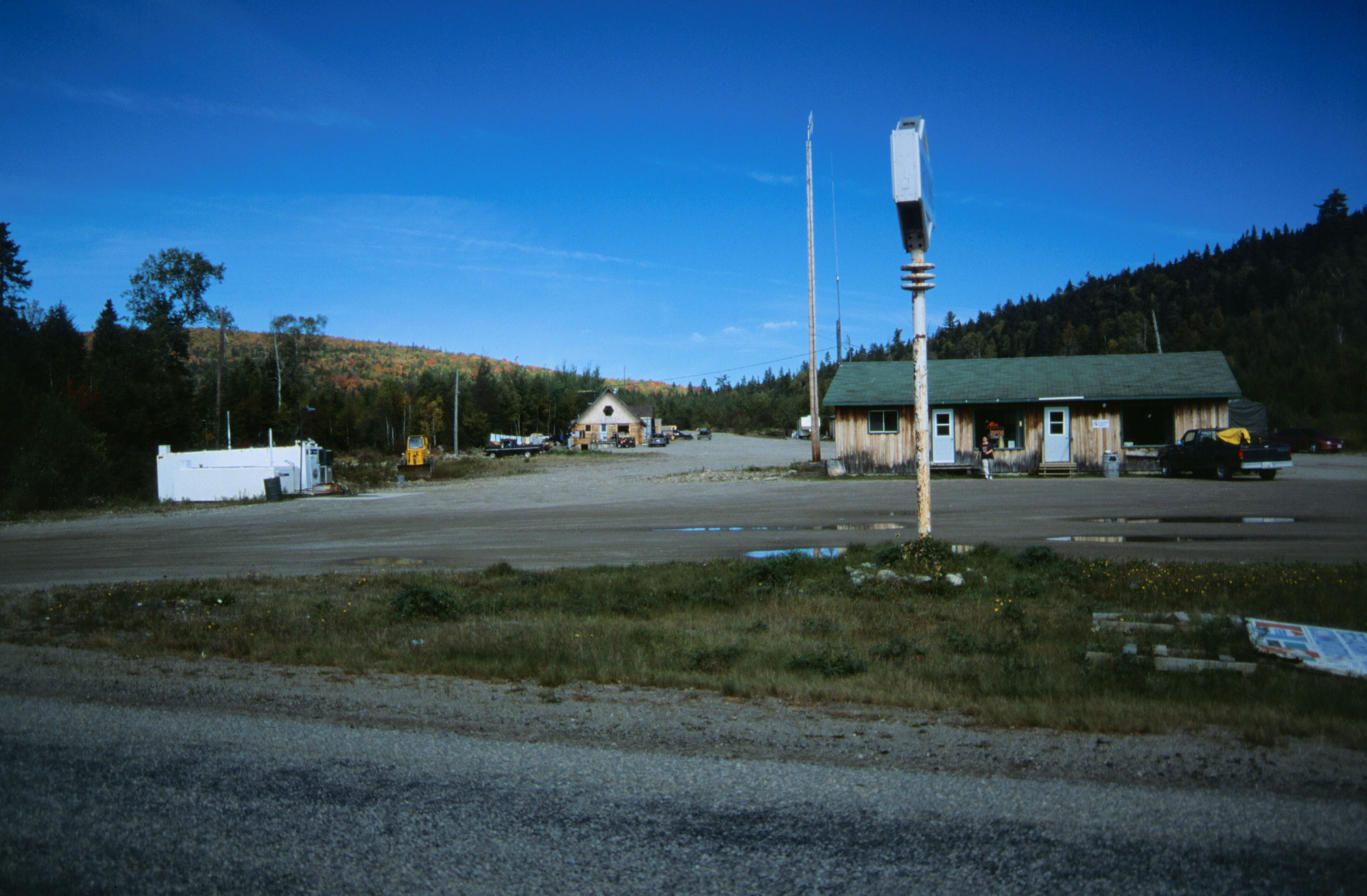
Halfway Restaurant and Irving station. As there was no electricity approximately halfway between Renous and Tobique Valley, this facility was powered by a generator.

The number 108 was first applied to a New Brunswick road in 1965 when it replaced the former Route 22. The original routing followed the current Route 108 from Grand Falls to Hazeldean, the current Route 395 to Tobique Valley, and a road along the north shore of the Tobique River (present-day Routes 109 and 390 to the Tobique First Nation north of Perth-Andover.

In the early 1970's after the opening of the new Plaster Rock bridge, the Plaster Rock-Renous Highway, which was formerly part of Route 109, was renumbered as part of Route 108, and the section from Tobique Valley to the Tobique First Nation was renumbered Route 390. In 1988, Route 108 was extended northeast from Renous along the former Route 8 alignment. With the opening of the Plaster Rock bypass in 1997, the section from Hazeldean to Tobique Valley was rerouted along an upgraded former Route 393, with the former alignment of 108 becoming parts of Routes 395 and 109.

The last change to Route 108 was with the opening of the new Trans-Canada Highway routing between Grand Falls and St-Leonard in 2003, when Route 108 was extended 3 kilometres to the west to meet up with the new interchange.

== See also ==
- List of New Brunswick provincial highways
