= Limestone–Gillespie Portage Border Crossing =

Canada–United States border crossing

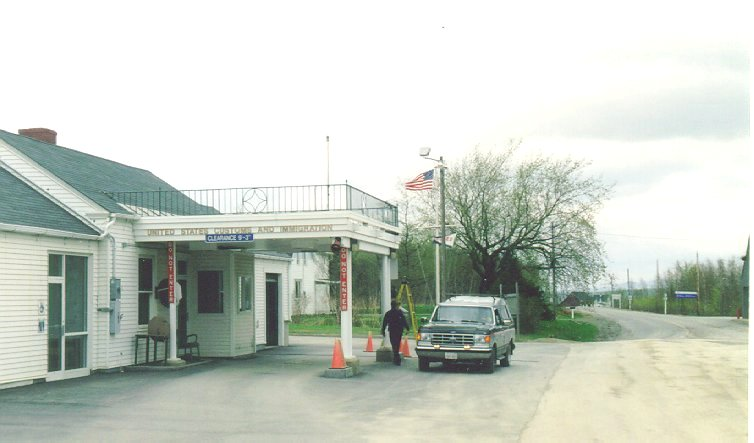
- US Border Inspection Station in Limestone, Maine as seen in 1998

Location
- Country: United States; Canada
- Location: SR 229 / Route 375; US Port: 410 Grand Falls Road, Limestone, ME 04750; Canadian Port: 600 Route 375, California Settlement, DSL de Grand-Sault NB E3Z 1Z6
- Coordinates: 46.924667°N 67.789571°W

Details
- Opened: 1929

Website
- Official Canadian website Official US website
- U.S. Inspection Station-Limestone, Maine
- U.S. National Register of Historic Places
- MPS: U.S. Border Inspection Stations MPS
- NRHP reference No.: 14000556
- Added to NRHP: September 10, 2014

The Limestone–Gillespie Portage Border Crossing is an international border crossing connecting the towns of Limestone, Maine, United States, and Grand-Sault, New Brunswick, Canada. The crossing is reached by Maine State Route 229 on the American side and by New Brunswick Route 375 on the Canadian side. The United States crossing facilities are the original facilities first built for this crossing in 1933, and were listed on the National Register of Historic Places in 2014.

South of the crossing, one hundred yards from the border, is a decommissioned Nike missile base that is now an auto repair shop. It was one of four that protected nearby Loring Air Force Base.

== Canadian facilities ==
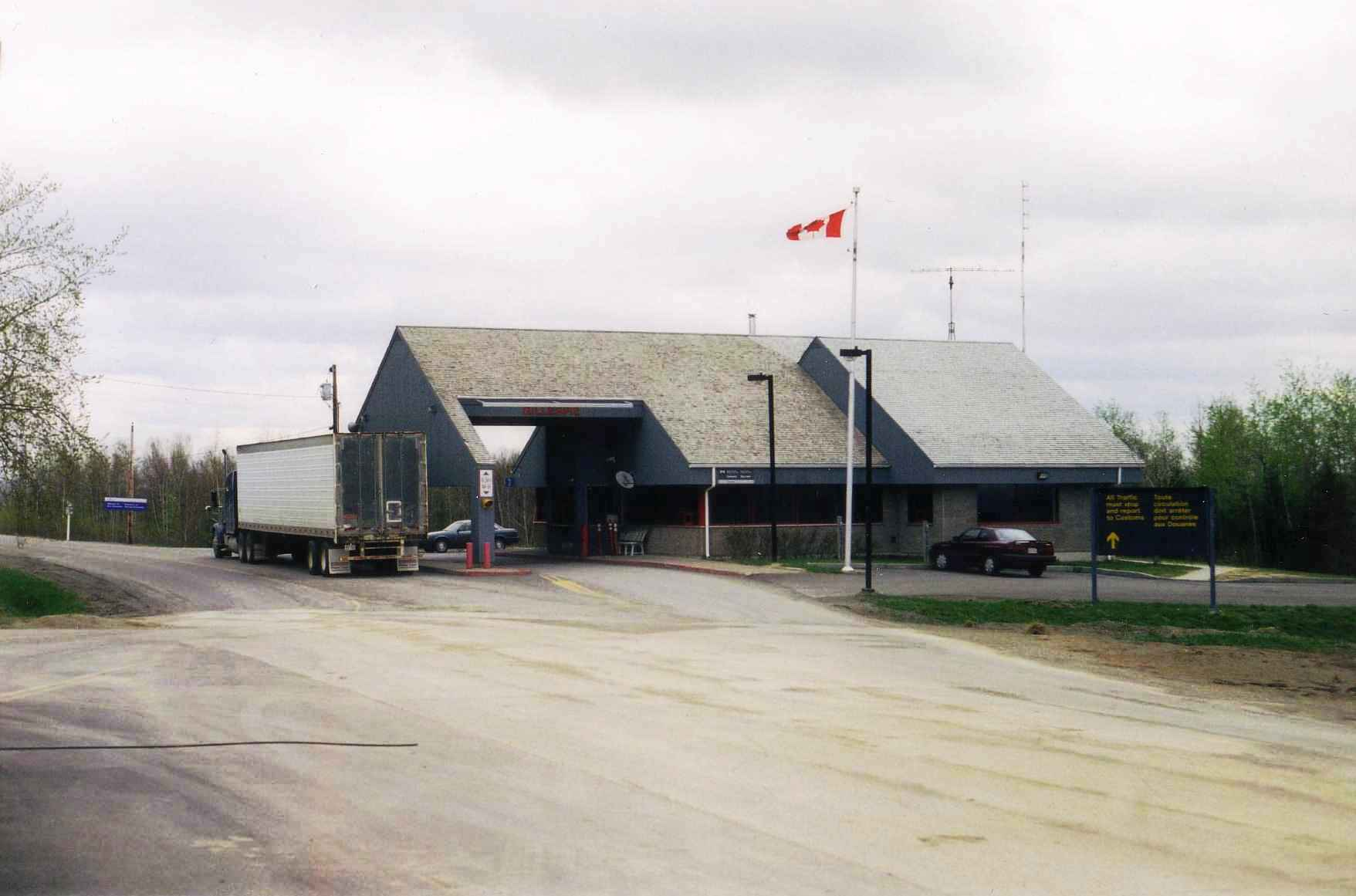
Canada Border Station at Gillespie Portage, NB as seen in 1998

The Canadian government first built a border station at this crossing sometime around 1930. The current facility was built in 1984.

== United States facilities ==
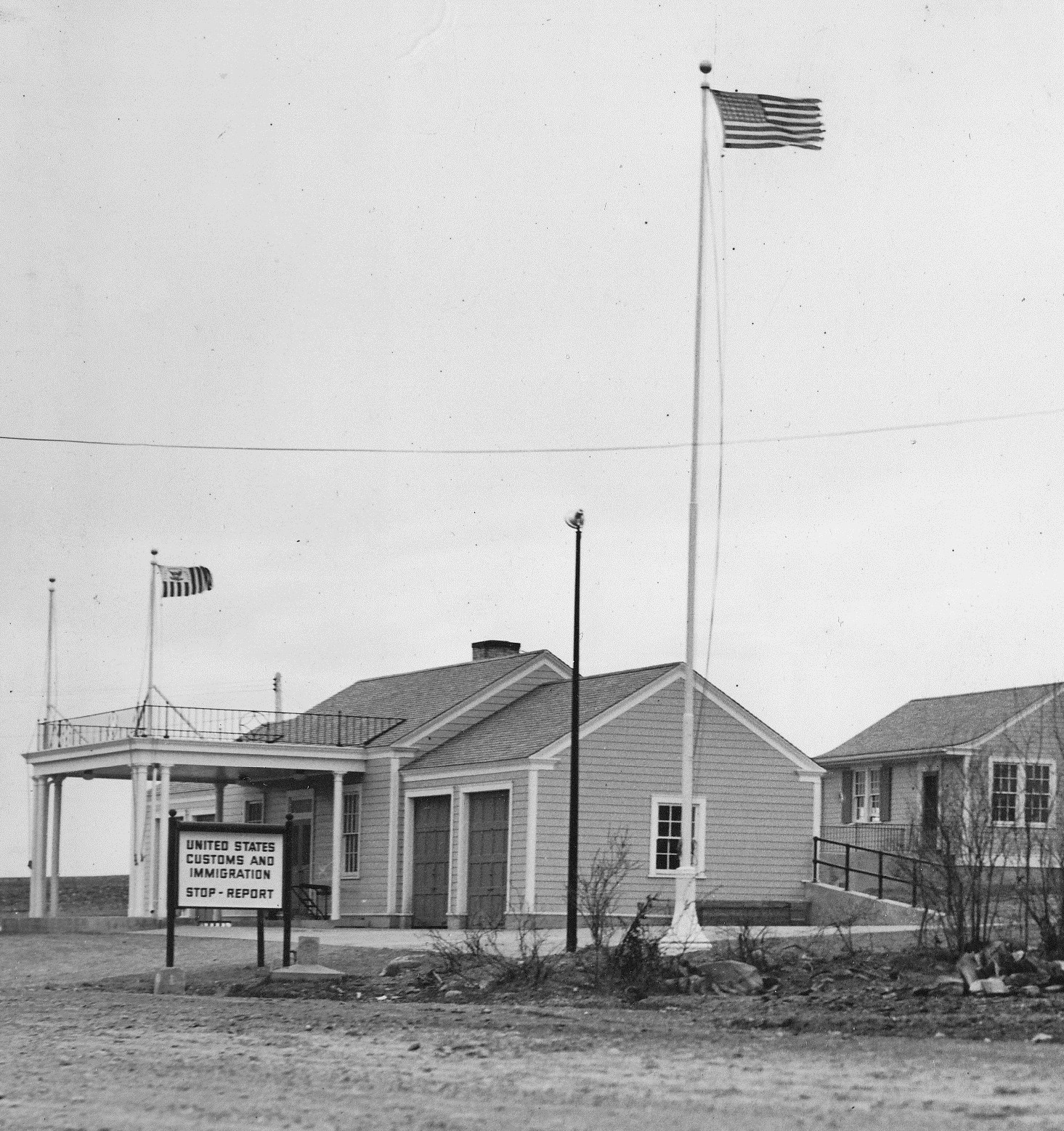
US Border Inspection Station in Limestone, Maine as seen in 1936

The United States border station originally included the main building and two residences, located to its rear. The residences have since been demolished. The main building is a wood frame structure, a single story in height, with a side gable roof and flanking wings, each of which houses two garage bays for performing inspections, and is located quite close to the border. The building was divided inside to provide space for performing customs procedures by the USCS on one side and immigration procedures by the INS on the other.

Before the construction of this station, customs and immigration formalities would have taken place in the nearest town. With the advent of increased automobile traffic in the 1920s, as well as the need to interdict the movement of contraband liquor due to Prohibition, the federal government realized the need for border stations where immigration formalities and vehicle inspections could be performed close to the border, and consequently planned the construction of a series of such stations. The Limestone station was authorized as part of a large authorization enacted in 1931. The federal government purchased land at the border from Walter and Hiram Phair in 1932, construction began in 1933, and the station was opened in January 1934. Although there were standardized building plans for the construction of these stations, the Limestone facilities are distinct in that they do not follow any of them. The station is similar to a "Type 2" facility, but uses less expensive construction materials. The station was listed on the National Register of Historic Places for its architecture and its historical associations with the federal government's efforts to control the nation's borders.

== See also ==
- List of Canada–United States border crossings
- National Register of Historic Places listings in Aroostook County, Maine
