= Oxbow, New Brunswick =

Coordinates: 47.01°N 67.30°W

Oxbow is a Canadian community in Victoria County, New Brunswick. It is located 15 km north of Tobique Valley along the west bank of the Tobique River along Route 385.

== History ==
Oxbow was the site of the last public school to operate in the parish of Lorne, Oxbow Elementary School, which closed in the 1990s.

== See also ==
- List of communities in New Brunswick
