= Tilly (name) =

Tilly is a feminine given name or nickname, and a surname. As a female given name or nickname, is generally a variant/diminutive for the Germanic name Matilda.

This name may refer to:

== Persons ==
=== Given name or nickname ===
- Tilly Armstrong (1927–2010), British romance novelist
- Tilly Aston (1873–1947), blind Australian writer and teacher, promoter of the rights of the vision-impaired
- Tilly Bagshawe (born 1973), British writer
- Tilly Bébé (1879–1932), Austrian circus performer
- Tilly Decker (born 1930), Luxembourgish sprinter
- Tilly Devine (born 1900), English-born Australian organised crime boss
- Tilly Edinger (1897–1967), German-American paleontologist and the founder of paleoneurology
- Tilly Greene, American romantic fiction author
- Tilly Hirst (1941–2021), New Zealand netball player
- Tilly Keeper (born 1997), British actress
- Tilly Key (born 1984), R&B/pop singer from the island of Corsica
- Tilly Losch (1903–1975), Austrian dancer, choreographer, actress, and painter
- Tilly O'Neill-Gordon (born 1949), Canadian politician
- Tilly Smith (born 1994), credited with saving about 100 beachgoers by recognising the signs of an approaching tsunami
- Tilly Spiegel (1906–1988), Austrian political activist
- Tilly van der Zwaard (1938–2019), Dutch middle distance runner
- Tilly Walnes (born 1980), English fashion designer, author and educator

=== Surname ===
Tilly

- Charles Tilly (1929–2008), American sociologist
- Friedrich Georg Tilly, mayor of Warsaw from 1799 to 1806
- Jacques Tilly (born 1963), German sculptor and illustrator
- Jennifer Tilly (born 1958), American actress and poker player, sister of Meg Tilly
- Louise A. Tilly (1930–2018), American historian
- Meg Tilly (born 1960), American actress and author, sister of Jennifer Tilly

de Tilly

- Alberto Octavio Tserclaes de Tilly (1646–1715), Spanish general in the War of the Spanish Succession
- Carolus de Tilly (1642–1698), Roman Catholic prelate, Bishop of Monopoli and Bishop of Acerra
- Jacques Louis François Delaistre de Tilly (1749–1822), French general in the Napoleonic Wars

== Characters ==
=== Given named or nicknamed ===
- Tilly Evans, on the British soap opera Hollyoaks
- Tilly Green, a main character from the TV series Big City Greens
- Tilly Hill, mother of Hank Hill in the animated sitcom King of the Hill
- Tilly Jackson, a Red Dead Redemption 2 character
- Tilly Wellwyn, title character of the play Tilly of Bloomsbury and its film adaptations
- Tilly, a French-speaking puppet from the British children's TV series Tots TV
- Tilly, in the James Bond film Goldfinger
- Tilly, the main character in Raymond Briggs' book and TV film The Bear

=== Surnamed ===
- Sylvia Tilly, in Star Trek: Discovery

== Other figures ==
- Tilly Norwood (introduced 2025), an AI-generated artificial person used as a virtual actress, and having social media accounts
- Tilikum (orca), sometimes referred to as Tilly, an orca at Sea World Orlando

== See also ==
- Tilly (disambiguation)
- Tillie (name)
