= Ortonville =

Ortonville is the name of several places:

United States

- Ortonville, California
- Ortonville, Michigan
- Ortonville, Minnesota
- Ortonville Township, Big Stone County, Minnesota

Canada

- Ortonville, New Brunswick, near Grand Falls
