= Anfield (disambiguation) =

Anfield is the home stadium of Liverpool FC.

Anfield may also refer to:

- Anfield, New Brunswick, a community in New Brunswick, Canada
- Anfield (suburb), a district of Liverpool, Merseyside, England
  - Anfield (Liverpool ward), a Liverpool City Council ward in the Liverpool Walton Parliamentary constituency
  - Anfield Cemetery or the City of Liverpool Cemetery

== See also ==
- Annfield Plain, a village in County Durham, England
  - Annfield Plain F.C., an amateur football club
  - Annfield Plain railway station, a former railway station
- Annfield Stadium, a former football stadium in Stirling, Scotland
