= Tobique Narrows Dam =

Coordinates: 46°46′50″N 67°41′41″W

- Interactive map of Tobique Narrows Dam

Dam and spillways
- Type of dam: Hydroelectric Dam

The Tobique Narrows Dam is a hydroelectric dam built on the Tobique River in the Canadian province of New Brunswick and operated by NB Power corporation. Its powerhouse has a capacity of 20 megawatts.

The dam and powerhouse were built between 1951 and 1953 near the confluence of the Tobique River with the Saint John River, several kilometers north of the village of Perth-Andover and 35 km upriver from the Beechwood Dam.

Highway 105 crosses the Tobique River along the top of the dam. A fish ladder helps migratory fish circumvent the 24 m head of the dam. The dam spans the river between Perth Parish, Victoria County on the south side, and Tobique First Nation on the north side.
