= Limestone, New Brunswick =

Limestone may refer to two different locations in the Canadian province of New Brunswick:

- Limestone, Carleton County, New Brunswick, a rural community
- Limestone, Victoria County, New Brunswick, a rural community
