= Limestone Township, Illinois =

Limestone Township may refer to one of the following places in the State of Illinois:

- Limestone Township, Kankakee County, Illinois
- Limestone Township, Peoria County, Illinois

See also

- Limestone Township (disambiguation)
