= Ortonville, New Brunswick =

Ortonville
- Community
- Location within New Brunswick
- Coordinates: 46°57′29″N 67°40′48″W
- Country: Canada
- Province: New Brunswick
- County: Victoria County
- Time zone: UTC−4 (Atlantic (AST))
  - Summer (DST): UTC−3 (ADT)
- Area code: 506

Ortonville is an unincorporated farming community located at a bend of the Saint John River 11 km (7 mi) south of Grand Falls, New Brunswick. It is on the west side of the river, 5.7 km (3.5 mi) north, north east of Limestone. Geographical coordinates are 46°57'29" North and 67°40'48" West.

== History ==
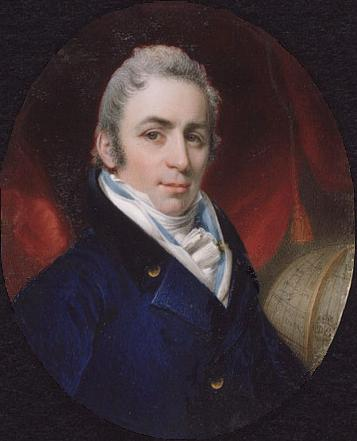
Lt. Joseph Bouchette

The earliest British, and probably the earliest European, settlement at or very near Ortonville was across the river at Salmon River Settlement. In May 1814 British North American surveyor-general Joseph Bouchette settled two military families here at the direction of Governor Sir George Prevost. Sensitive to the presence of the recently hostile United States nearby, Prevost wanted a communication route from Fredericton to Upper and Lower Canada to serve as an alternative if the St. Lawrence River were to freeze. The two settled families at the Salmon River had been disbanded from the Tenth or Fourth Royal Veteran's Battalion and together with other military settlers formed a series of widely dispersed stations along the Saint John River. Three families were here by 1817.

Early families included Hitchcock, McLaughlin, and Gallagher who settled here before Ortonville received a name separate from the Salmon River Settlement. The Benjamin Hitchcock, Jr., family petitioned for land here in 1862, and settled here by 1865.

A post office was located in private homes of six different postmasters between 1883 and 1964, all members of the Gallagher, Hitchcock, and McLaughlin families. "In 1898 Ortonville was a flag station on the Canadian Pacific Railway and a settlement with a population of 75."

A cable ferry was located here in the first half of the twentieth century. Perley Hitchcock and then George Gallagher ran a small store at the foot of the ferry hill on the Albert Victor Hitchcock farm in the 1920s and 1930s.

There was a two-room schoolhouse in the 1930s and 1940s. The Ortonville Baptist church was organized in 1861

=== Name ===
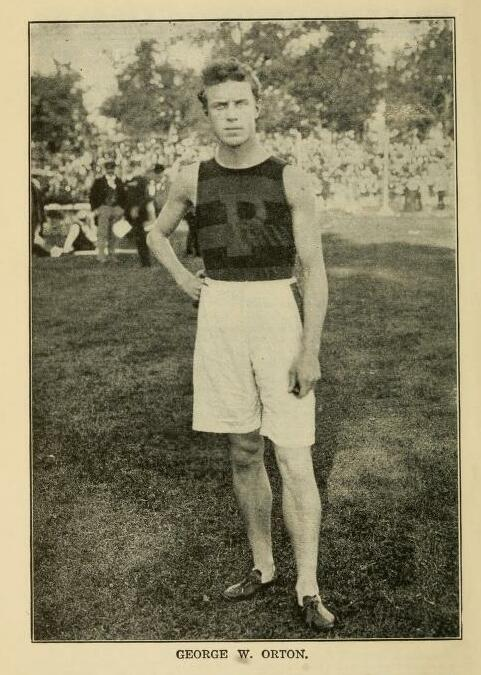
George Orton, first Canadian and first person with a disability to win an Olympic gold medal, wearing his University of Pennsylvania uniform

The name Ortonville was in use by June 1886 when "Ortenville" native John Renfrew Hitchcock's marriage was reported in the Saint John Daily Telegraph.

There is only circumstantial evidence that this community was named after Canada's first olympian, George Orton, whose prominence as a middle-distance runner was established at approximately the same time as Ortonville was named. The unknown railway official who named it may not have known Orton was Canadian. However neither Rayburn nor Ganong had an alternative explanation.

== See also ==
- List of communities in New Brunswick
