= Crombie Settlement, New Brunswick =

Coordinates: 46°56′17.9″N 67°26′47.4″W

Crombie Settlement is a Canadian rural community in Victoria County, New Brunswick.

== Overview ==
Some current residents of Crombie Settlement claim that the settlement was founded by a man named John Crombie, not to be confused the founder of Crombie, a clothing line. The area was once the site of several family-owned farms and the settlement's early period was characterised by extensive lumbering.

Crombie Settlement is situated along Highway 108 at the base of Geneau Mountain. Crombie Settlement is located between Blue Bell, Hazeldean and Sisson Ridge.

== See also ==
- List of communities in New Brunswick
