= Shirley Bear =

Tobique First Nation artist (1936–2022)

Shirley Bear (May 16, 1936 – November 19, 2022) was a Wolastoqiyik artist, traditional herbalist, poet, and activist from Tobique First Nation, part of the Wabanaki Confederacy.

== Background ==
The daughter of Susan Paul-Bear and Noel Bear Jr., she was born in Neqotkuk in New Brunswick, and studied photography and painting at the Whistler House Museum and the Boston Museum. In 1969, she received a Ford Foundation fellowship.

In 1996, Bear moved to Vancouver, British Columbia, where she lived for ten years and served important roles in several major institutions: Cultural Advisor to the British Columbia Institute of Technology; First Nations Advisor at Emily Carr Institute of Art and Design; and Resident Elder for First Nations House of Learning at the University of British Columbia.

== Artistry ==
Her work has appeared in exhibitions at the Clement Cormier Gallery in Moncton, at the Université Saint-Louis in Edmundston, as well as in group exhibitions in Canada and the United States. In 2011, the Beaverbrook Art Gallery organized a major retrospective exhibition called Nekt wikuhpon ehpit — Once there lived a woman, The Painting, Poetry and Politics of Shirley Bear (curated by Terry Graff). Her work is included in the collections of the Indigenous Art Centre, the Beaverbrook Art Gallery, Carleton University Art Gallery, Burnaby Art Gallery, First Nations House of Learning at the University of British Columbia, the University of Moncton, and the Canadian Museum of History's permanent collection.

Works held at the New Brunswick Art Bank include Crane Woman, Abenaki Woman, and Moose with a Woman's Spirit.

In 1990, she was curator for the ground-breaking national touring exhibition, Changers: A Spiritual Renaissance, which was the first exhibition of First Nations women artists to have been curated by a First Nations woman.

She was the subject of Minqwon Minqwon, a short NFB film by Catherine Martin produced in 1990.

== Advocacy ==
Shirley Bear was a longtime advocate for Indigenous and women's rights in Canada. In 1980, Bear became involved with the Tobique Women's Group, starting with activities at the Big Cove Reserve involving the unjust treatment of single mothers and housing. Later that year, Bear was invited by the Tobique Women's Group to participate in a meeting of Indigenous women interested in establishing a political body that would represent Indigenous women from the Canadian province of New Brunswick. As part of the Tobique Women's Group, Bear was at the forefront of a long campaign that eventually resulted in Bill C-31, an amendment to the Indian Act in 1985 that ended over one hundred years of legislated sexual discrimination against Indigenous women.

== Awards and honors ==
In 2002, she received the New Brunswick Arts Board's Excellence in the Arts Award.

In 2011, she was named to the Order of Canada.

== Work ==
Exhibitions (Curator):

- Changers: A Spiritual Renaissance – Touring Exhibition of Contemporary Art by Women of Native Ancestry (National Indian Arts and Crafts Corporation, 1990).

Select Exhibitions (Artist):

- Ancient Images: Images of Petroglyphs by Shirley Bear, Mount Saint Vincent University, 1990.
- Wibhun: Shirley Bear, Burnaby Art Gallery, 2007.
- Nekt wikuhpon ehpit – Once there lived a woman: The Painting, Poetry and Politics of Shirley Bear, Beaverbrook Art Gallery, 2011.
- Celebrating Women, Indigenous Art Centre, Crown-Indigenous Relations and Northern Affairs Canada (CIRNAC), 2018.
- wesuwe-tpelomosu, Beaverbrook Art Gallery, 2023.
- Weaving Together: The Art of Shirley Bear, MacOdrum Library, Carleton University, 2024.

Her work has been collected in a variety of anthologies, including The Color of Resistance: A Contemporary Collection of Writing by Aboriginal Women.

Some of her well-known books include:

- "Nekt wikuhpon ehpit Once there lived a woman: The Painting, Poetry and Politics of Shirley Bear," an exhibition catalogue written by Terry Graff, with accompanying essays by Susan Crean and Carol Taylor.
- Nine Micmac Legends, Alden Nowlan; Illustrations: Shirley Bear
- Enough is Enough (1987)
- Everywoman's Almanac (1991)
- The Colour of Resistance (1993)
- Kelusultiek (1994)
- Virgin Bones / Belayak Kcikug'nas'ikn'ug (2006) which was her own collection of artwork, poetry, and other political pieces (published by McGilligan Books).
  Some of her well-known pieces from Virgin Bones include:
  - Freeport, Maine
  - History Resource Material
  - Baqwa'sun Wuli, Baqwa'sun
  - September Morning
  - Fragile Freedoms
