= Richmond Parish, New Brunswick =

Richmond
- Parish
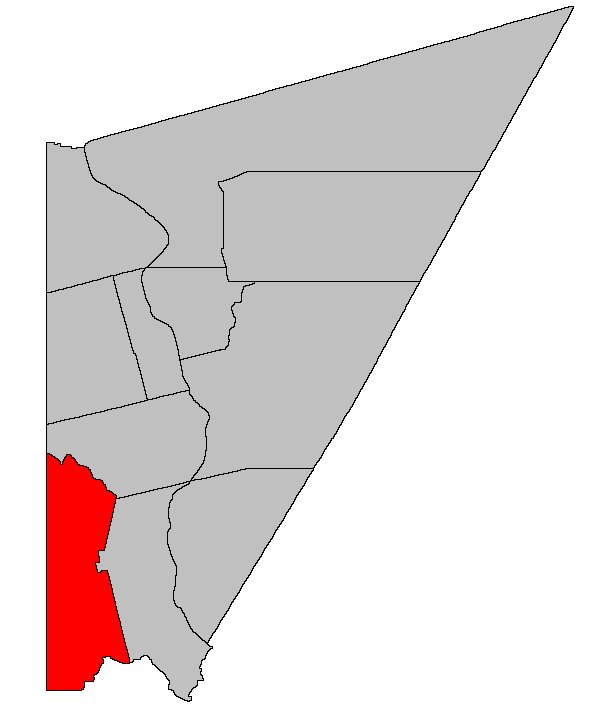
- Location within Carleton County, New Brunswick
- Coordinates: 46.075°N 67.6575°W
- Country: Canada
- Province: New Brunswick
- County: Carleton
- Erected: 1853

Area
  - Land: 258.80 km^{2} (99.92 sq mi)

Population (2021)
  - Total: 1,456
  - Density: 5/km^{2} (13/sq mi)
  - Change 2016-2021: ▲11.7%
  - Dwellings: 598
- Time zone: UTC-4 (AST)
  - Summer (DST): UTC-3 (ADT)

Richmond is a geographic parish in Carleton County, New Brunswick, Canada, located west of Woodstock.

Prior to the 2023 governance reform, for governance purposes it was comprised one local service district (LSD) and parts of two others, all of which were members of the Western Valley Regional Service Commission (WVRSC).

The census subdivision of Richmond Parish shares the geographic parish's borders.

== Origin of name ==
The parish may have been named in honour of the Duke of Richmond, Governor General of British North America 1818-1819, as the area was opened for settlement in 1817.

Another possibility is that some of the early settlers came from Richmond, New York.

== History ==
Richmond was erected in 1853 from the western part of Woodstock Parish.

== Boundaries ==
Richmond Parish is bounded:

- on the west by the international border,
- on the north by the Meduxnekeag River,
- on the east by the second tier of land grants west of the Saint John River,
- on the south by a line true east from Boundary Monument No. 1 to the Eel River, then downstream to the Woodstock Parish line.

== Local service districts ==
All LSDs assessed for street lighting and community & recreation services in addition to the basic LSD services of fire protection, police services, land use planning, emergency measures, and dog control.

=== Richmond Parish ===
The local service district of the parish of Richmond comprised all of the parish north of Debec. It also included a small wetland area west of the mouth of Fish Creek until 2014.

The parish LSD was established in 1966 to assess for fire protection following the abolition of county government by the new Municipalities Act. Community services were added in 1967 and recreational facilities in 1995.

The taxing authority was 212.00 Richmond.

LSD advisory committee: Unknown.

=== Debec ===
The local service district of Debec Consolidated School District comprised most of Richmond Parish south of Curries Lake as well as a very irregular area along the western side of Woodstock Parish, extending as far east as the junction of Dugan and Critter Roads. The school district extended into North Lake Parish, unlike the current LSD.

Debec was established in 1966 to assess for fire protection for the whole LSD and for street lighting at Debec Junction. Community services were added in 1967, recreational facilities and first aid & ambulance service in 1972.

The taxing authorities were 213.01 Debec Inside (the street lighting area) and 2013.02 Debec Outside.

LSDAC: Yes, as of 28 May 2020. Chair Jim Kennedy served on the WVRSC board from at least 2015 until June 2018. Chair Lucas Flemming replaced Kennedy on the WVRSC board in June 2018 but was not listed as a member on the most recent board minutes.

=== Woodstock Parish ===
The local service district of the parish of Woodstock included a small area of wetlands west of the mouth of Fish Creek beginning in 2014. The taxing authority was 218.00 Woodstock.

== Communities ==
Communities at least partly within the parish; italics indicate a name no longer in official use

- Blowdown
- Campbell Settlement
- Debec
- Elmwood
- Elmwood Station
- Green Road
- Houlton Road
- Irish Settlement
- Kirkland
- Limestone
- McKenzie Corner
- Monument
- Oak
- Oak Mountain
- Plymouth
- Richmond Corner
- Union Corner
- Watson Settlement
- Wickham

== Bodies of water ==
Bodies of water (Note: Not including brooks, ponds or coves.) at least partly in the parish:

- Eel River
- Meduxnekeag River
- Bull Creek
- Curries Lake
- Greens Lake
- Henderson Lake
- Morrison Lake
- Saunderson Lake
- Sherwood Lakes

== Other notable places ==
Parks, historic sites, and other noteworthy places at least partly in the parish.

- Belleville Protected Natural Area
- Hovey Hill Protected Natural Area
- Meduxnekeag Valley Protected Natural Area
- Oak Mountain Protected Natural Area
- Smith Brook Protected Natural Area
- Woodstock Road

== Demographics ==
=== Population ===
Population trend

Census	Population	Change (%)
2016	1,303	▼4.1%
2011	1,358	▼4.0%
2006	1,414	▲0.7%
2001	1,404	▼1.3%
1996	1,422	▲5.6%
1991	1,347	N/A

=== Language ===
Mother tongue (2016)

Language	Population	Pct (%)
English only	1,265	97.3%
Other languages	20	1.5%
French only	15	1.2%
Both English and French	0	0.0%

== See also ==
- List of parishes in New Brunswick
