= Grand Falls Portage =

- Dispersed Rural Community
- Location within New Brunswick.
- Coordinates: 47°0′47″N 67°45′27″W
- Country: Canada
- Province: New Brunswick
- County: Victoria
- Parish: Grand Falls
- Time zone: UTC-4 (AST)
  - Summer (DST): UTC-3 (ADT)

Grand Falls Portage is a settlement in Victoria County, New Brunswick, Canada. Grand Falls Portage is located 3.9 kilometres (2.4 mi) south of Grand Falls at the intersection of Route 2 (Trans-Canada Highway) and Route 130.

== See also ==
- List of communities in New Brunswick
