= Tillie (name) =

Tillie is a feminine given name, a nickname and a surname. It may refer to:

== Given name or nickname ==
=== Women ===
- Tillie Amartey (born 2003), English actress and television presenter
- Tillie Anderson (1875–1965), Swedish road and track cyclist, member of the United States Bicycling Hall of Fame
- Tillie Baldwin (1888–1958), born Anna Mathilda Winger, American rodeo contestant and performer, member of the National Cowgirl Hall of Fame and the National Cowboy Hall of Fame
- Tillie Ehringhaus (1890–1980), First Lady of North Carolina
- Tillie May Forney (1862-1922), American writer and journalist
- Tillie K. Fowler (1942–2005), American politician
- Tillie Hardwick (1924–1999), Pomo Indian woman instrumental in reversing the California Indian Rancheria termination policy of the U.S. government
- Ottilie Tillie Klimek (1876–1936), Polish-American serial killer
- Tillie Lewis (1901–1977), American businesswoman and entrepreneur
- Tillie Moreno (born 1953), Filipino R&B/soul/pop singer
- Tillie Olsen (1912–2007), American writer and early feminist
- Tillie Paul (1863–1952), Tlingit translator and Christian missionaries
- Tillie S. Pine (1896–1999), American children's writer
- Tillie Taylor (1922–2011), Canadian judge and social activist, first female magistrate in the province of Saskatchewan
- Tillie Walden (1996), American cartoonist
- Tillie Pierce (1848–1914), author of At Gettysburg, or What A Girl Saw and Heard of the Battle: A True Narrative.

=== Men ===
- Henry Tillie Lamar (1865–1891), American college football player
- Taldon Tillie Manton (1910–1991), American National Football League player
- Arthur Tillie Shafer (1889–1962), American Major League Baseball player
- Walter Tillie Voss (1897–1975), American National Football League player

== Surname ==
A family of French sportspeople:

- Laurent Tillie (born 1963), volleyball player and coach; father of:
- Kim Tillie (born 1988), basketball player
- Kévin Tillie (born 1990), volleyball player
- Killian Tillie (born 1998), basketball player

== See also ==
- Tillie (disambiguation)
- Tilly (disambiguation)
