= Tilly =

Tilly may refer to:

== Places ==
=== France ===
- Tilly, Eure, in the Eure département
- Tilly, Indre, in the Indre département
- Tilly, Yvelines, in the Yvelines département
- Tilly-Capelle, in the Pas-de-Calais département
- Tilly-la-Campagne, in the Calvados département
- Tilly-sur-Meuse, in the Meuse département
- Tilly-sur-Seulles, in the Calvados département

=== Elsewhere ===
- Tilly, Arkansas, United States, an unincorporated community
- Tilly, Belgium, a village in the municipality of Villers-la-Ville
- Tillicoultry, a village in Clackmannanshire, Scotland
- Tillydrone, an area of Aberdeen, Scotland

== People, figures, characters ==
- Tilly (name), including a list of people and characters with the given name, nickname or surname

=== Persons ===
- Johann Tserclaes, Count of Tilly (1559–1632), field marshal in the Thirty Years' War often referred to as Tilly

=== Fictional characters ===
- Tilly, a French-speaking puppet from the British children's TV series Tots TV
- Tilly, in the James Bond film Goldfinger
- Tilly, the main character in Raymond Briggs' book and TV film The Bear

=== Other figures ===
- Tilikum (orca), sometimes referred to as Tilly, an orca at Sea World Orlando

== Other uses ==
- Tilly (book), a novel by Frank E. Peretti
- "Tilly", a poem by James Joyce featured in Pomes Penyeach
- Tilly (vehicle), a utility vehicle produced during the Second World War for the British armed forces; the name was retained for later military vehicles
- Tillys, a United States–based retail clothing company
- Tilly, a short form for the plant genus Tillandsia

== See also ==
- Tilley (disambiguation)
- Tillie (disambiguation)
- Till (disambiguation)
