= Anderson Road, New Brunswick =

Community in New Brunswick, Canada

Coordinates: 46.880°N 67.526°W

Location of Anderson Road in New Brunswick

Anderson Road is a community in the Canadian province of New Brunswick, located in Victoria County. The road itself is known for being completely straight yet running over several steep-grade hills for approximately 14 km from its eastern terminus at Route 390 just north of Arthurette to where it turns sharply at Bell Grove. Along the populated area, there are two major intersections at Bedford Rd. in the south and Currie Rd. in the north.

There are several small logging operations in the community, as well as a few small farms. Anderson Road is home to approximately 250 people.

== See also ==
- List of communities in New Brunswick
