= Graydon Nicholas =

Canadian attorney, judge, and politician

The Honourable Graydon Nicholas CM ONB

30th Lieutenant Governor of New Brunswick
- In office 30 September 2009 – 23 October 2014
- Monarch: Elizabeth II
- Governors General: Michaëlle Jean; David Johnston
- Premier: Shawn Graham; David Alward; Brian Gallant
- Preceded by: Herménégilde Chiasson
- Succeeded by: Jocelyne Roy-Vienneau

Personal details
- Born: 1946 (age 79–80) Tobique First Nation, New Brunswick, Canada
- Profession: Judge

Graydon Nicholas CM ONB (born 1946) is a Canadian attorney, judge, and politician who served as the appointed 30th Lieutenant Governor of New Brunswick (2009-2014). He is the first Indigenous person to hold the office, the first to be appointed as a provincial court judge (in 1991), and the first in Atlantic Canada to obtain a law degree.

== Early life and education ==
Graydon Nicholas was born into a Maliseet family on the Tobique First Nations Reserve. He earned a Bachelor of Science degree from St. Francis Xavier University and, in 1971, a Bachelor of Law degree from the University of New Brunswick. He was the first First Nations person in Atlantic Canada to earn a law degree. He also obtained a Master of Social Work degree from Wilfrid Laurier University in 1974.

== Career ==
Returning to New Brunswick, Nicholas worked for the Union of New Brunswick Indians, serving as its chairman of the board (1976–1980) and president (1980–1988). Selected as chair of the Native Studies program at St. Thomas University, he has lectured part time.

Nicholas was appointed as a provincial court judge in 1991, but not the first aboriginal to be selected for the position in Atlantic Canada (see, James Igloliorte, Happy Valley-Goose Bay, NL, 1980–81). He has worked for justice for First Nations and other peoples, particularly in the area of logging rights. During this period, he also lectured in theology at the Vancouver School of Theology and the Native Ministries Consortium program.

In September 2009, Nicholas was appointed as the next Lieutenant Governor of New Brunswick on the advice of Prime Minister Stephen Harper, on the suggestion of Premier Shawn Graham with support from the opposition. He was the first Aboriginal named to this position. He served a five-year term. He succeeded Herménégilde Chiasson, the poet and philosopher, on September 30, 2009.

== Honours ==
- New Brunswick Human Rights Award
- Fredericton YMCA Peace Medallion
- Canada 125 Medal
- Inaugural recipient of the Golden Jubilee Medal
- 2011, Nicholas was honoured as one of Wilfrid Laurier University's 100 alumni of achievement
- Member of the Order of New Brunswick and of the Order of Canada

== See also ==
- The Canadian Crown and Aboriginal peoples
