= Tillie, Pennsylvania =

Unincorporated community in Pennsylvania, US

Tillie McKnightstown Station
- unincorporated community
- Location of Tillie in Pennsylvania
- Coordinates: 39°51′25″N 77°19′28″W
- Country: United States
- State: Pennsylvania
- County: Adams
- Township: Franklin
- Post Office: 1892
- Time zone: UTC-5 (EST)
  - Summer (DST): UTC-4 (EDT)
- ZIP code: 17325
- Area code: 717
- Namesake: Tillie Town Road

Mcknightstown Station (formerly known as Tillie) is a populated place in Adams County, Pennsylvania, United States, east of Orrtanna and south of McKnightstown that was the site of the McKnightstown railroad station on the Hanover Junction, Hanover and Gettysburg Railroad east of Orr Station and west of Seven Stars station after the railroad line was extended west from Gettysburg, Pennsylvania, in 1884 and west of Marsh Creek in 1885.
