= New Brunswick Route 395 =

Highway in New Brunswick, Canada

Coordinates: 46.904776°N 67.48764°W

Route 395

Route information
- Maintained by New Brunswick Department of Transportation

Major junctions
- North end: Route 108 in Hazeldean
- South end: Route 109 in Three Brooks

Location
- Country: Canada
- Province: New Brunswick
- Major cities: Anfield, McLaughlin, Bedford Road,

Highway system
- Provincial highways in New Brunswick; Former routes
← Route 390	→ Route 415

Route 395 is a 12-kilometre (7.5 mi) long mostly North–South secondary highway in the northwest portion of New Brunswick, Canada.

The route's North-Eastern terminus starts at an intersection in the community of Hazeldean. The road travels south-east to the community of Anfield. The road continues south to the community of McLaughlin, then Bedford Road before traveling east to the community of Three Brooks.

== Intersecting routes ==
- None
