= Limestone Mountain =

Mountain in West Virginia, United States

Coordinates: 39°13′20″N 79°41′55″W

Limestone Mountain is a summit in West Virginia, in the United States. With an elevation of 3,100 feet (940 m), Limestone Mountain is the 325th highest summit in the state of West Virginia.

Limestone Mountain was named for its blue limestone rock formations.
