= New Brunswick Route 390 =

Highway in New Brunswick, Canada

Coordinates: 46.803232°N 67.46923°W

Route 390

Route information
- Maintained by New Brunswick Department of Transportation

Major junctions
- East end: Route 105 in Tobique Narrows
- West end: Route 108 in Tobique Valley

Location
- Country: Canada
- Province: New Brunswick
- Major cities: Rowena, Gladwyn, Red Rapids, Arthurette, Odell River, Beveridge, Wapske, Arbuckle

Highway system
- Provincial highways in New Brunswick; Former routes
| ← Route 385 | → Route 395 |

Route 390 is a 12-kilometre (7.5 mi) long mostly east–west secondary highway in the northwest portion of New Brunswick, Canada.

The route's North-Eastern terminus starts at a sharp turn at route 105 in Tobique Narrows. The road travels south-east following the North bank of the Tobique River passing through the communities of Rowena and Gladwyn. The road continues north-east continuing to follow the Tobique River to the communities of Red Rapids, then Arthurette before crossing the river then following the south bank of the river. The road continues North-East to the communities of Odell River, Beveridge, passing Ox Island and finally Wapske, before ending in Arbuckle at Route 108 just outside Tobique Valley.

== Intersecting routes ==
- None
