= New Brunswick Route 380 =

Highway in New Brunswick, Canada

Coordinates: 46.925648°N 67.587891°W

Route 380

Route information
- Maintained by New Brunswick Department of Transportation
- Length: 29 km (18 mi)

Major junctions
- East end: Route 105 North-East of Limestone
- West end: Route 109 in Saint Elmo

Location
- Country: Canada
- Province: New Brunswick
- Major cities: Lake Edward, New Denmark Corner, Outlet Brook, Bell Grove, Merritt Lake, Anderson Road,

Highway system
- Provincial highways in New Brunswick; Former routes
← Route 375	→ Route 385

Route 380 is a 29-kilometre (18 mi) long mostly east–west secondary highway in the northwest portion of New Brunswick, Canada.

The route's North-Eastern terminus is north-east of the community of Limestone. The road travels south-east to the community of Lake Edward. The road then takes a sharp turn north to the community of New Denmark Corner. The road again makes a sharp turn this time towards the south-east passing Outlet Brook before entering the community of Bell Grove. The road then switches direction to the south-west again then enters the community of Merritt Lake. After this, the road takes its last major directional change south-east passing the community of Anderson Road before ending in Saint Elmo.

== Intersecting routes ==
- None
