= Arthurette, New Brunswick =

Farming community in Victoria County

Coordinates: 46.7915°N 67.486778°W

Location of Arthurette in New Brunswick

Arthurette is a Canadian farming community in Victoria County, New Brunswick. It is located on the Tobique River halfway between the villages of Tobique Valley and Perth-Andover. The community is located where the Route 109 and Route 390 change banks of the Tobique River.

== History ==
The community was named after Arthuret in Cumbria, England by Arthur Hamilton-Gordon, 1st Baron Stanmore, who was lieutenant governor of New Brunswick from 1861 to 1866.

There was once a covered bridge, but it was destroyed during the spring freshet on April 22, 1950. A replacement bridge was also swept away during a fall freshet on November 6.

== Notable people ==
- Former New Brunswick Premier John B. McNair was raised in Arthurette.

== See also ==
- List of communities in New Brunswick
