= Morrell, New Brunswick =

Coordinates: 46°51′17″N 67°41′48″W

Morrell is a Canadian rural community in Victoria County, New Brunswick. Although sometimes called Morrell Siding, Morrell is the official name.

== See also ==
- List of communities in New Brunswick
