= Four Falls, New Brunswick =

Community in New Brunswick, Canada

Coordinates: 46.830°N 67.735°W

Location of Four Falls in New Brunswick

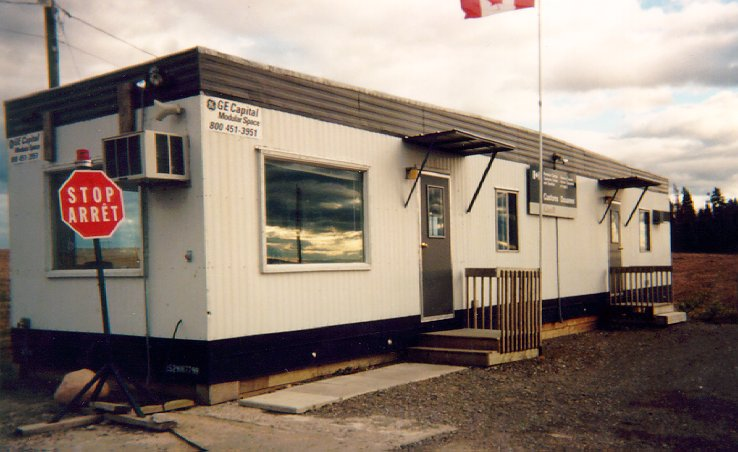
Canadian border inspection station at Four Falls

Four Falls is a community in the Canadian province of New Brunswick, located in Victoria County.

== See also ==
- List of communities in New Brunswick
