= New Brunswick Route 375 =

Highway in New Brunswick, Canada

Route 375

Route information
- Maintained by New Brunswick Department of Transportation
- Length: 5.4 km (3.4 mi)

Major junctions
- East end: Route 130 in Lower Portage
- West end: SR 229 at the U.S. Border in Gillespie Portage

Location
- Country: Canada
- Province: New Brunswick

Highway system
- Provincial highways in New Brunswick; Former routes
| ← Route 370 | → Route 380 |

Route 375 is a 5.4-kilometre (3.4 mi) long east–west secondary highway in the northwest portion of New Brunswick, Canada.

The route's northeastern terminus is in the community of Lower Portage at Route 130. The road travels west, passing under Route 2 (Trans-Canada Highway) (no direct access), before passing Pines Lake and continuing to the US Border at the Limestone–Gillespie Portage Border Crossing near Limestone, Maine, where it becomes Maine State Route 229.
