= Maine State Route 229 =

State highway in Aroostook County, Maine, US

State Route 229

Route information
- Maintained by MaineDOT
- Length: 1.94 mi (3.12 km)
- Existed: 1939–present

Major junctions
- West end: US 1A in Limestone
- East end: Route 375 at the Canadian border near Limestone

Location
- Country: United States
- State: Maine
- Counties: Aroostook

Highway system
- Maine State Highway System; Interstate; US; State; Auto trails; Lettered highways
← SR 228	→ SR 230

State Route 229 (SR 229) is a state highway located entirely within the town of Limestone in extreme northeastern Maine. It begins at U.S. Route 1A (US 1A) downtown and runs 1.94 miles (3.12 km) east to the Canada–US border, where it connects to New Brunswick Route 375. SR 229 is also known as Grand Falls Road.

== Route description ==
SR 229 begins at US 1A (Main Street) in downtown Limestone and heads eastward as Grand Falls Road. The highway crosses over a railroad track and leaves downtown Limestone, passing to the south of Limestone Pond. The route passes several residences and periods of large farms and grasslands surrounding the two-lane highway. Just before the intersection with Morris Road, SR 229 makes a short turn further northeast and intersects with Blake Road and Nike Road. Just after the intersection with Nike Road, SR 229 passes one farm and reaches the Gillespie Portage Border Crossing. At the Canadian border, SR 229 ends and the road continues eastward in New Brunswick as Route 375 towards Grand Falls.

The border crossing is open from 6:00 AM–10:00 PM EST, 7 days a week, year round. Outside of these hours, traffic may use the Fort Fairfield-Andover Border Crossing, located 14 miles (23 km) south and accessible via US 1A and SR 161.

== Junction list ==
The entire route is in Limestone, Aroostook County.

mi	km	Destinations	Notes
0.00	0.00	US 1A (Main Street) to SR 89 – Fort Fairfield, Caribou, Van Buren	Western terminus
1.94	3.12	Route 375 east – Grand Falls NB	Eastern terminus; Maine–New Brunswick state/provincial line (Canada–United States border)
1.000 mi = 1.609 km; 1.000 km = 0.621 mi
