= Odell, New Brunswick =

Coordinates: 46.8166°N 67.4334°W

Odell is a Canadian community in Victoria County, New Brunswick.

== See also ==
- List of communities in New Brunswick
