= Sisson Ridge, New Brunswick =

Settlement in New Brunswick, Canada

Coordinates: 46.913°N 67.436°W

Location of Sisson Ridge in New Brunswick

Sisson Ridge is a settlement in New Brunswick. It is 5 km (3.1 mi) west of Tobique Valley. Adjacent communities include Crombie Settlement, Anfield, Weaver, North View and Linton Corner.

The current population of Sisson Ridge is estimated to be around 300.

== History ==
Until the mid-1990s, it was the site of the Sisson Ridge Elementary School.

== Notable people ==
Canadian Member of Parliament Wayne Marston was raised in Sisson Ridge prior to moving to Ontario in the 1960s.

== See also ==
- List of communities in New Brunswick
