= Limestone Run =

Limestone Run may refer to:

- Limestone Run (Montour and Northumberland Counties, Pennsylvania)
- Limestone Run (North Branch Potomac River)
- Limestone Run (Union County, Pennsylvania)
