= Anfield, New Brunswick =

Community in New Brunswick, Canada

Coordinates: 46.928389°N 67.516194°W

Location of Anfield in New Brunswick

Anfield is a community in the Canadian province of New Brunswick located on Route 395. It is situated in Gordon, a parish of Victoria County.

== History ==
Anfield was originally known as Bungalow Farm before being given its present name in 1916.

== See also ==
- List of communities in New Brunswick
- List of people from Victoria County, New Brunswick
