= Limestone, Victoria County, New Brunswick =

Limestone
- Dispersed Rural Community
- Location within New Brunswick.
- Coordinates: 46°55′40″N 67°42′14″W
- Country: Canada
- Province: New Brunswick
- County: Victoria
- Parish: Grand Falls
- Founded: 1898
- Time zone: UTC-4 (AST)
  - Summer (DST): UTC-3 (ADT)
- Area code: 506

Limestone is a community in Victoria County, New Brunswick, Canada. Limestone is situated along the Saint John River, between Route 105 and Route 130.

== History ==
Limestone was founded in 1898 as a flag station on the Canadian Pacific Railway.

== See also ==
- List of communities in New Brunswick
