= Limestone, Carleton County, New Brunswick =

Limestone
- Dispersed rural community
- Location within New Brunswick.
- Coordinates: 46°2′16″N 67°40′51″W
- Country: Canada
- Province: New Brunswick
- County: Carleton
- Parish: Richmond
- Founded: 1834
- Time zone: UTC-4 (AST)
  - Summer (DST): UTC-3 (ADT)
- Area code: 506

Limestone is a community in Carleton County, New Brunswick, Canada, near Route 540.

== History ==
When it was founded in 1834, the community was known as Ivey Corner in honour of two of the first individuals to arrive.

== See also ==
- List of communities in New Brunswick
