= Lower Kintore, New Brunswick =

Canadian settlement in New Brunswick

Lower Kintore
- Coordinates: 46°40′0″N 67°37′1″W
- Country: Canada
- Province: New Brunswick
- County: Victoria County
- Parish: Perth
- Founded: 1870s

Lower Kintore is a Canadian settlement, founded by Scottish immigrants.

A populated place in Perth Parish, Victoria County, New Brunswick, Lower Kintore is located at 46°40′0″N 67°37′1″W. In the Köppen climate classification, Lower Kintore has a warm-summer humid continental climate

Lower Kintore was founded in the 1870s by Scottish settlers who left Kincardineshire in 1873, and had paid over £7 (equivalent to £789.45 in 2023) to do so. In 1909, a church was built. In the 1873–74 academic year, the Lower Kintore school district received CA$50 (equivalent to $1,425 in 2023) from a New Brunswick Legislature grant for education, though for the 1901–02 academic year, the district had no classes because the schoolhouse needed replacing.
