= Limestone County =

Limestone County is the name of two counties in the United States:

- Limestone County, Alabama
- Limestone County, Texas
