= Limestone Township =

Limestone Township may refer to:

- Limestone Township, Franklin County, Arkansas, in Franklin County, Arkansas
- Limestone Township, Kankakee County, Illinois
- Limestone Township, Peoria County, Illinois
- Limestone Township, Jewell County, Kansas
- Limestone Township, Alger County, Michigan
- Limestone Township, Lincoln County, Minnesota
- Limestone Township, Buncombe County, North Carolina, in Buncombe County, North Carolina
- Limestone Township, Duplin County, North Carolina, in Duplin County, North Carolina
- Limestone Township, Clarion County, Pennsylvania
- Limestone Township, Lycoming County, Pennsylvania
- Limestone Township, Montour County, Pennsylvania
- Limestone Township, Union County, Pennsylvania
- Limestone Township, Warren County, Pennsylvania
- Limestone Township, Orangeburg County, South Carolina, in Orangeburg County, South Carolina
