= North Tilley, New Brunswick =

Community in New Brunswick, Canada

North Tilley is a community in the Canadian province of New Brunswick, located in Victoria County.

== See also ==
- List of communities in New Brunswick
