= Upper Kintore, New Brunswick =

Community in New Brunswick, Canada

Coordinates: 46°43′N 67°35′W

Upper Kintore is a rural community in the Canadian province of New Brunswick, located in Victoria County.

== History ==
It received its name from migrants on the ship Castella who named it after Kintore, Scotland.

== See also ==
- List of communities in New Brunswick
