= Hazeldean, New Brunswick =

Coordinates: 46.949611°N 67.532222°W

Location of Hazeldean in New Brunswick

Hazeldean is a community in the Canadian province of New Brunswick. It is located around the intersection of Route 108 and Route 395 halfway between Tobique Valley and New Denmark close to Blue Bell Lake. Today, there are approximately 200 residents in Hazeldean.

== History ==
In the early part of the 20th century, the community sprung up around a train station.

== See also ==
- List of communities in New Brunswick
