= Riley Brook, New Brunswick =

Settlement in New Brunswick, Canada

Coordinates: 47.169°N 67.223°W

Location of Riley Brook in New Brunswick

Riley Brook is a settlement in New Brunswick.

The former local service district of Riley Brook took its name from the community.

== History ==
Said to be named for a man who drowned there. The Wolastoqey name is Natakayid, possibly meaning "Bald Head place".

== Demographics ==
In the 2021 Census of Population conducted by Statistics Canada, Riley Brook had a population of 40 living in 21 of its 43 total private dwellings, a change of -43.7% from its 2016 population of 71. With a land area of 10.76 km^{2} (4.15 sq mi), it had a population density of 3.7/km^{2} (9.6/sq mi) in 2021.

== See also ==
- List of communities in New Brunswick
