= Tobique First Nation =

First Nations band in Canada

Tobique
- Band No. 16
- Wolastoqiyik Neqotkuk
- People: Wolastoqiyik
- Province: New Brunswick

Land
- Main reserve: Tobique 20
- Reserve: The Brothers 18
- Land area: 27.558 km^{2} (10.640 sq mi)

Population (June 2025)
- On reserve: 1639
- On other land: 6
- Off reserve: 1067
- Total population: 2712

Government
- Chief: Ross Perley
- Council: Edwin Bernard; Benjamin Dee; Stephanie Francis; Donald Hafke; Tina Martin; Julian Moulton; Richard Moulton; Aaron Nicholas; Christian Perley; Kim Perley; Jasmine Pirie; Adam Saulis

Tribal Council
- Mawiw Council Incorporated

Website
- https://tobiquefirstnation.ca/

Tobique First Nation (Malecite-Passamaquoddy: Wolastoqiyik Neqotkuk) is one of six Wolastoqiyik or Maliseet Nation band governments in New Brunswick, Canada.

The Tobique Reserve is located on the north side of the Tobique River. The reserve comprises two lots (The Brother's #18, 4 ha; Tobique #20, 2724 ha). The Tobique Reserve, established in 1801 with nearly 20,000 acres (8,100 ha), was granted after a petition to the government by band members. Over the years, the reserve was reduced by surrenders to squatters and a major surrender in 1892. Roughly two-thirds of members of Tobique First Nation reside on the reserve lands.

In 2009 the Government of Canada accepted the Tobique Specific Land Claim related to 10,533 acres (4,263 ha) which was lost in the invalid surrender of 1892. Canada and the First Nation, in collaboration with the provincial government, will be negotiating a settlement compensation package. No existing landowners will be disturbed.

== History ==
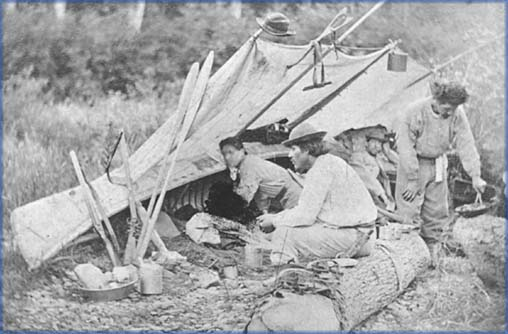
Photograph of a Maliseet camp in Tobique in 1865 (by George Taylor).

An 1854 survey established that the original Tobique reserve had an area of 18,394 acres. The Tobique lost 2,539 acres in the town of Perth due to squatters pre- and post-confederation. In addition, they argue under the Tobique Specific Land Claim (see sections below) that they lost 10,433 acres in the alleged 1892 Surrender.

=== 1892 Surrender Claim ===
In 1890 the government of New Brunswick attempted to open a large portion of the Tobique Reserve for settlement by non-Aboriginal peoples. In order to move towards this goal, the government of New Brunswick conducted a land surrender in 1892. But, the surrender was conducted without the consent of the Order in Council, a necessary step in the surrender process. The surrender concerned land "south of the Tobique river saving and excepting a tract of two hundred acres on the south-side designated as Indian Meadows." The government sold most of the land to individuals, except for 169 acres (68 ha), which was returned to the Tobique band in 1965.

The Tobique First Nation has been working on the issues of land claims. It has filed two specific claims suits: one for the 2,539 acres lost in the town of Perth; and one for more than 10,000 acres lost in the 1892 surrender, which amounted to nearly two-thirds of its land.

On May 23, 2008 Canada accepted only the second as the Tobique Specific Land Claim for negotiation on the basis of its lawful obligation due to an invalid surrender. Under the terms of negotiation, the government and First Nation have three years to reach agreement on a compensation package for the claim. Existing property owners will not be affected, as settlement does not include expropriation. Under the Specific Claim Policy, the First Nation is entitled to be compensated for the Current Unimproved Market Value of the Claim Lands and Compensation for Loss of Use, the reasonable and probable Loss of Use that occurred because of the breach, from July 1, 1867 to 2009.

== Confrontation with New Brunswick Power Corporation ==
Tobique First Nation and the New Brunswick Power Corporation (NB Power) (a Crown corporation) have had a long history of confrontation over uses of the land and waters. The First Nation rejected the company's bid to construct a hydro-electric dam on the Tobique River in 1844, and in 1895. By 1945, the provincial and federal Canadian governments had started development of a dam on the Tobique River, the Tobique Narrows Dam.

In 1950, the Premier of New Brunswick approved the construction of the Mactaquac Dam in south-central New Brunswick without the consent of Tobique First Nation, the legal landowners. It was put into service in 1953. Despite a longstanding (1945) offer from Tobique to settle all disputes in exchange for unlimited use of the dam's power within Tobique for all domestic uses [and] business on the reservation. According to many reports, "this was never honoured. As soon as the community had power lines, they received power bills. The Band Council paid these bills for Elders and community members on social assistance." In 2008, the Tobique began to refuse to pay for the electricity generated by the plant on their land. They have also reported that the damming of the river has created environmental problems.

In 2008, the Tobique began a protest, refusing to pay the "bills" from NB Power. In addition, they demanded that the company remove from the reserve construction debris, including barrels filled with toxic pesticides and herbicides, and PCBs, that dated to the dam's construction. When the company threatened to cut off power to the reserve, a number of residents set up a blockade at the dam, requiring NB Power trucks to register with the Nation before entry. In 2009, tensions escalated when an NB Power truck did not stop at a road block. Members of the Nation seized the NB Power truck.

On June 30, 2009, the provincial Minister of Aboriginal Affairs committed to funding the clean-up of toxic and other wastes dumped at and around the dam, as well as restoration of eroded riverbanks, further damages noted by the Tobique. The dams on the St. John's River have drastically reduced the Atlantic Salmon run, cutting into the ability of the Tobique to feed themselves and adversely affecting the local economy.

As the blockade entered its third month in the summer of 2009, the federal government's Department of Justice accepted the Tobique First Nation’s specific land claim for negotiation. It is likely to be one of the largest in Atlantic Canada. The Tobique wish to negotiate some sharing of benefits from the dam, with some portion of electricity available at least to reserve residents but preferably also for resale.

A deal was reached in December 2009 to share electricity, remediate the dump site and provide training for First Nation members to work at the dam. Under the December 2009 deal, New Brunswick Power will provide five megawatts of power from the dam to the Tobique. The dam produces approximately 20 megawatts. However, with modern run of the river hydroelectric technology, the power potential of the river is very much greater, in hundreds of megawatts.

== Notable people ==
- Andrea Bear Nicholas, Chair in Native Studies since 1993 at St. Thomas University, Fredericton, New Brunswick, Canada; founder with Dorothy Lazore of the first university-based Native Language Immersion Teacher Training Program in North America
- Sandra Lovelace Nicholas, Aboriginal activist for the rights of women and children to status, Canadian Senator, recipient of the Order of Canada.
- Graydon Nicholas, first Aboriginal Lieutenant-Governor of New Brunswick. Former Lieutenant-Governor of New Brunswick.
- Shirley Bear, feminist, activist, and artist, received Order of Canada in 2011 for work on Maliseet-language films shown on APTN
- Jeff Bear, producer, independent documentaries, including four Maliseet-language films shown on APTN (Urban Rez Productions)
- Jeremy Dutcher, Classically-trained Canadian Indigenous tenor, composer, musicologist, performer and activist, Juno Award winner.

== See also ==
- List of communities in New Brunswick
