= Tobique Valley =

- Village
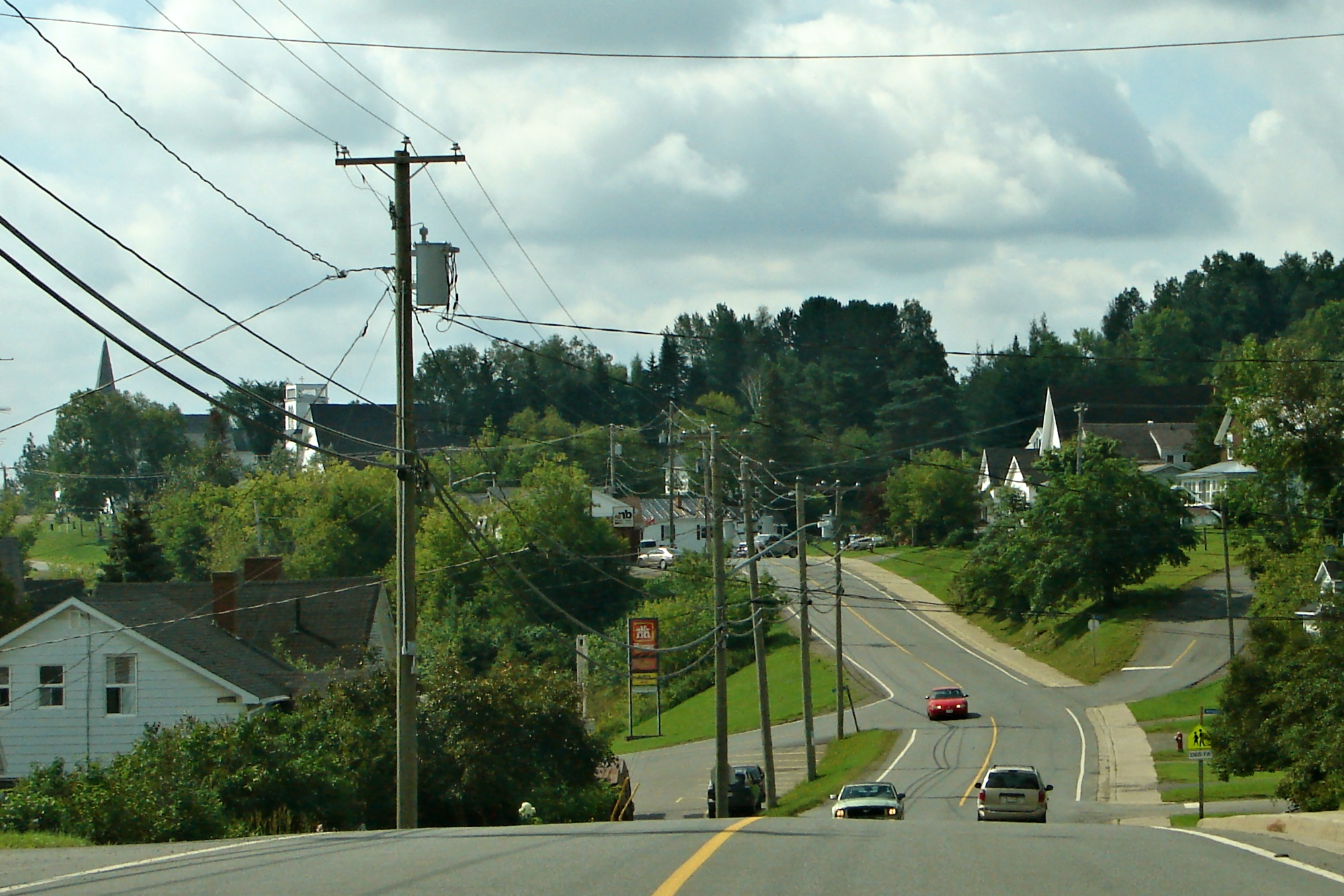

- Location within New Brunswick
- Coordinates: 46°53′00″N 67°23′00″W
- Country: Canada
- Province: New Brunswick
- County: Victoria
- Regional service commission: Western Valley
- Incorporated: January 1, 2023

Government
  - Mayor: Aaron Jones
- Time zone: UTC-4 (AST)
  - Summer (DST): UTC-3 (ADT)
- Postal code(s): E7G
- Area code: 506

Tobique Valley is a village in the Canadian province of New Brunswick. It was formed through the 2023 New Brunswick local governance reforms.

== History ==
Tobique Valley was incorporated on January 1, 2023 via the amalgamation of the former village of Plaster Rock and the concurrent annexation of adjacent unincorporated areas.

== See also ==
- List of communities in New Brunswick
- List of municipalities in New Brunswick
