= Tobique River =

River in New Brunswick, Canada

Coordinates: 46°46′N 67°42′W

The Tobique River (pro. Toe-Bick) is a river in northwestern New Brunswick, Canada. The river rises from Nictau Lake in Mount Carleton Provincial Park and flows for 148 kilometres to its confluence with the Saint John River near Perth-Andover.

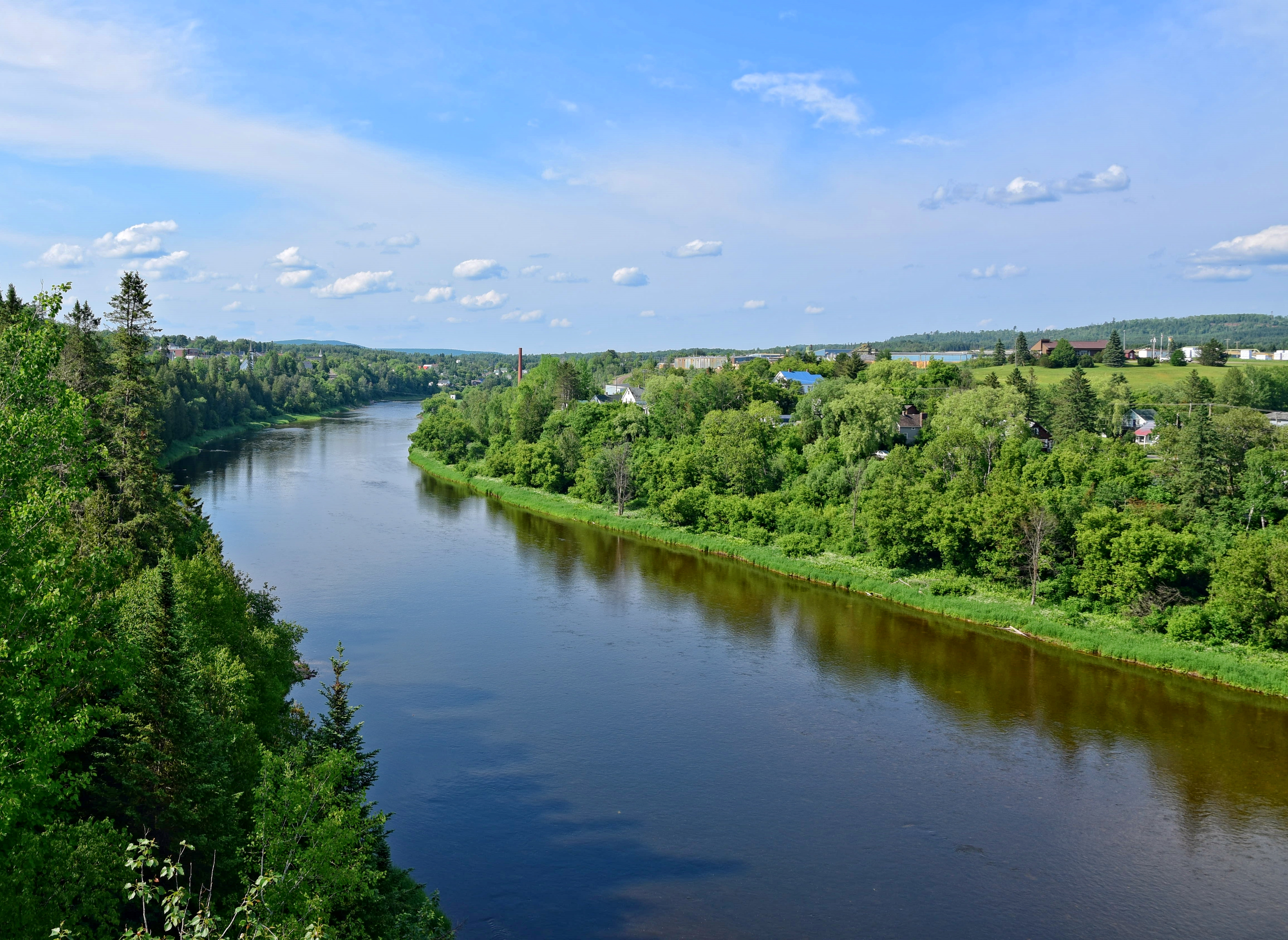
Tobique River in Plaster Rock

The Tobique River Flows in a general southwesterly direction down through Victoria County, New Brunswick. The Tobique is formed just outside the small community of Nictau, New Brunswick. It is made through the conjoining of the two main tributaries known as the Little Tobique River and the Campbell River. After the river forms in Nictau, it travels down through many small communities. These communities are Riley Brook, Blue Mountain Bend, Oxbow, and Three Brooks. It then passes through the town of Plaster Rock, where just below it is joined by the Wapske River. The Tobique flows west from there, past the Tobique First Nation, to the Saint John River. Just before the Tobique Dam, facing the dam, there is a beach to the left side, which is private property and a heavy rock cut to the right. This makes for very beautiful pictures during the fall foliage. In the summer the Tobique River is a popular tourist attraction for boating and kayaking. During the month of July, it is host to the Fiddlers on the Tobique river run.

The Tobique Narrows Dam was built between 1951 and 1953 by NB Power approximately one kilometre from the river's mouth.

The river is named for a Maliseet chief Noel Tobec (1706-1767) who lived at the mouth of the river.

== See also ==
- List of bodies of water of New Brunswick
