= Ludlow Parish, New Brunswick =

Ludlow
- Parish
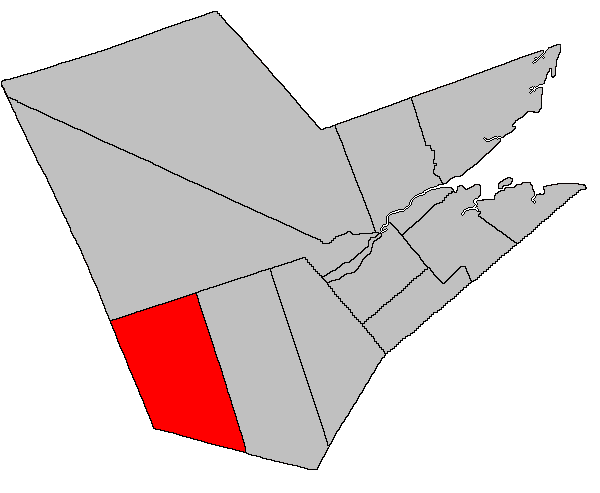
- Location within Northumberland County, New Brunswick
- Coordinates: 46.49°N 66.35°W
- Country: Canada
- Province: New Brunswick
- County: Northumberland
- Erected: 1814

Area
  - Land: 1,016.66 km^{2} (392.53 sq mi)

Population (2011) (Note: Ludlow Parish was not profiled in the 2016 census.)
  - Total: 1,543
  - Density: 1.5/km^{2} (3.9/sq mi)
  - Change 2006-2011: ▼1.6%
  - Dwellings: 772
- Time zone: UTC-4 (AST)
  - Summer (DST): UTC-3 (ADT)
- No census data available after 2011

Ludlow is a geographic parish in Northumberland County, New Brunswick, Canada. (Note: The Territorial Division Act divides the province into 152 parishes, the cities of Saint John and Fredericton, and one town of Grand Falls. The Interpretation Act clarifies that parishes include any local government within their borders.)

For governance purposes it is part of the incorporated rural community of Upper Miramichi, which is a member of the Greater Miramichi Regional Service Commission (GMRSC). Before the creation of Upper Miramichi in 1971, Ludlow Parish was a local service district.

== Origin of name ==
Ludlow was named in honour of the Ludlow brothers.

The Ludlow brothers were prominent Loyalist judges and members of the Executive Council of New Brunswick. George Duncan was appointed first Chief Justice of the Supreme Court of New Brunswick, while younger brother Gabriel George was first Mayor of Saint John; both died in 1808. Carleton Parish, named for their political ally Thomas Carleton, first Governor of New Brunswick, was erected simultaneously.

== History ==
Ludlow was erected in 1814 from unassigned territory in the western part of the county plus a strip of Newcastle Parish.

Ludlow included Blackville and Blissfield Parishes plus the western part of Kent County until 1830.

== Boundaries ==
Ludlow Parish is bounded:

- on the north by a line beginning at a point on the York County line near McConnell Brook, then running north 72º east by an astronomic bearing to the northeastern corner of Blackville Parish, a point 537 chains (10.8 kilometres) from the Canadian National Railway line through Quarryville on a line running north 22º west (Note: By the magnet of 1814, when declination in the area was between 16º and 17º west of north. The Territorial Division Act clause referring to magnetic direction bearings was omitted in the 1952 and 1973 Revised Statutes.) from the mouth of the Renous River;
- on the east by a line running north and south from the mouth of Big Hole Brook, which is on the western edge of Doaktown;
- on the south by the Sunbury and York County lines;
- on the west by the York County line.

=== Evolution of boundaries ===
The eastern line of Blackville Parish, prolongated to Westmorland County, was the original eastern line of Ludlow, putting most of Harcourt and Huskisson Parishes in Ludlow. The northern line was further south, putting much of Route 108 in Northesk Parish.

In 1830 Ludlow was split three ways, with the eastern part becoming Blackville Parish and the central part becoming Blissfield Parish, while the northern line was moved roughly where it is today.

Changes in the wording of the boundary with Northesk Parish and later Southesk Parish in 1850, 1877, and 1954 made little if any difference in the parish line.

== Communities ==
Communities at least partly within the parish. all communities are part of the incorporated rural community of Upper Miramichi

- Amostown
- Bettsburg
- Big Hole Brook
- Boiestown
- Carrolls Crossing
- Holtville
- Ludlow
- McNamee
- Nelson Hollow
- New Bandon
- O'Donnells
- Porter Brook
- Porter Cove
- Priceville

== Bodies of water ==
Bodies of water (Note: Not including brooks, ponds or coves.) at least partly within the parish.

- Bartholomew River
- Dungarvon River
  - Boars Head Narrows
- Little Dungarvon River
- Renous River
- Southwest Miramichi River
- Longs Creek
- Indian Village Lake
- Lake of the Plains
- more than 15 other officially named lakes

== Islands ==
Islands at least partly within the parish.

- Amos Islands
- Boiestown Islands
- Clems Island
- Lyons Island
- McCarty Island
- O'Donnell Island
- Porcupine Island
- Portage Island
- Suter Island
- Sand Plum Bar

== Other notable places ==
Parks, historic sites, and other noteworthy places at least partly within the parish.

- Dungarvon Protected Natural Area
- Plaster Rock-Renous Wildlife Management Area
- Spud Brook Protected Natural Area

== Demographics ==
=== Population ===
Population trend

Census	Population	Change (%)
2011	1,543	▼1.6%
2006	1,568	▼8.3%
2001	1,709	▼6.5%
1996	1,827	▲0.2%
1991	1,824	N/A

=== Language ===
Mother tongue language (2006)

Language	Population	Pct (%)
English only	1,520	99.35%
French only	10	0.65%
Other languages	0	0.00%
Both English and French	0	0.00%

== See also ==
- List of parishes in New Brunswick
