= Blissfield Parish, New Brunswick =

Blissfield
- Parish
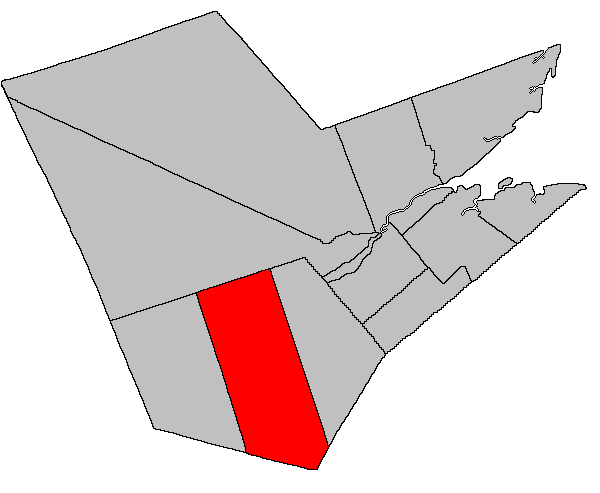
- Location within Northumberland County, New Brunswick
- Coordinates: 46.59°N 66.055°W
- Country: Canada
- Province: New Brunswick
- County: Northumberland
- Erected: 1830

Area
  - Land: 1,235.57 km^{2} (477.06 sq mi)

Population (2021)
  - Total: 491
  - Density: 0.4/km^{2} (1.0/sq mi)
  - Change 2016-2021: ▲8.9%
  - Dwellings: 256
- Time zone: UTC-4 (AST)
  - Summer (DST): UTC-3 (ADT)
- Figures do not include portion within the village of Doaktown

Blissfield is a geographic parish in Northumberland County, New Brunswick, Canada. (Note: The Territorial Division Act divides the province into 152 parishes, the cities of Saint John and Fredericton, and one town of Grand Falls. The Interpretation Act clarifies that parishes include any local government within their borders.)

For governance purposes it is divided mainly between the village of Doaktown and the Greater Miramichi rural district, with small areas along the eastern and western borders belonging to the incorporated rural communities of Miramichi River Valley and Upper Miramichi, respectively. All are members of the Greater Miramichi Regional Service Commission.

Prior to the 2023 governance reform, the parish was divided between a much smaller village of Doaktown and the local service district of the parish of Blissfield.

== Origin of name ==
Blissfield was named in honour of John Murray Bliss, who was Administrator of the province prior to Lieutenant-Governor Howard Douglas's arrival. Neighbouring Blackville Parish was named in honour of William Black, Administrator of the province due to Douglas's absence at the time both parishes were erected.

== History ==
Blissfield was erected in 1830 by the three-way split of Ludlow Parish, Blissfield in the middle and Blackville to the east.

== Boundaries ==
Blissfield Parish is bounded:

- on the north by a line beginning at a point on the York County line near McConnell Brook, then running north 72º east by an astronomic bearing to the northeastern corner of Blackville Parish, a point 537 chains (10.8 kilometres) from the Canadian National Railway line through Quarryville on a line running north 22º west (Note: By the magnet of 1814, when declination in the area was between 16º and 17º west of north. The Territorial Division Act clause referring to magnetic direction bearings was omitted in the 1952 and 1973 Revised Statutes.) from the mouth of the Renous River;
- on the east by a line running north and south from the mouth of Donnelly Brook, which is on the southern bank of the Southwest Miramichi River west of Upper Blackville Bridge;
- on the south by the Kent and Sunbury County lines;
- on the west by a line running north and south from the mouth of Big Hole Brook, which is on the western edge of Doaktown

=== Evolution of boundaries ===
When Blissfield was erected the eastern line extended to the Westmorland County line, putting part of modern Harcourt Parish in Blissfield.

In 1845 the Kent County line was changed to run southwesterly instead of southeasterly, now meeting the line between Queens and Sunbury Counties. A triangle of wilderness at the southeastern corner was transferred to Kent County.

== Communities ==
Communities at least partly within the parish. bold indicates an incorporated municipality; italics indicate a name no longer in official use

- Amostown
- Blissfield
- Gilks
- Grand Lake Road
- Hazelton
- McGraw Brook
- Renous Forks
- Storeytown
- Weaver Siding
- **Doaktown**
  - Russelltown
  - South Road Settlement

== Bodies of water ==
Bodies of water (Note: Not including brooks, ponds or coves.) at least partly within the parish.

- Bartholomew River
- Cains River
- Dungarvon River
- Gaspereau River
- Renous River
- Southwest Miramichi River
- Devils Back Lake
- Little Lake
- Shakey Lake

== Islands ==
Islands at least partly within the parish.

- Mercury Island
- Pine Island
- Weaver Island
- Brown Bar
- Wasson Bar

== Other notable places ==
Parks, historic sites, and other noteworthy places at least partly within the parish.

- Big Rocky Brook Protected Natural Area
- Doak House Provincial Park
- Doaktown Airport
- Dungarvon Whooper Spring Woodlot Protected Natural Area
- McGraw Brook Picnic Site
- Plaster Rock-Renous Wildlife Management Area

== Demographics ==
Parish population total does not include former incorporated village of Doaktown. Revised census figures based on the 2023 local governance reforms have not been released.

=== Population ===
**Population trend**

Census	Population	Change (%)
2016	451	▼10.0%
2011	501	▼10.5%
2006	560	▼11.9%
2001	636	▼5.6%
1996	674	▲4.2%
1991	647	N/A

=== Language ===
**Mother tongue (2016)**

Language	Population	Pct (%)
English only	445	97.8%
French only	5	1.1%
Other languages	5	1.1%
Both English and French	0	0%

== See also ==
- List of parishes in New Brunswick
