= Geography of New Brunswick =

New Brunswick, Canada

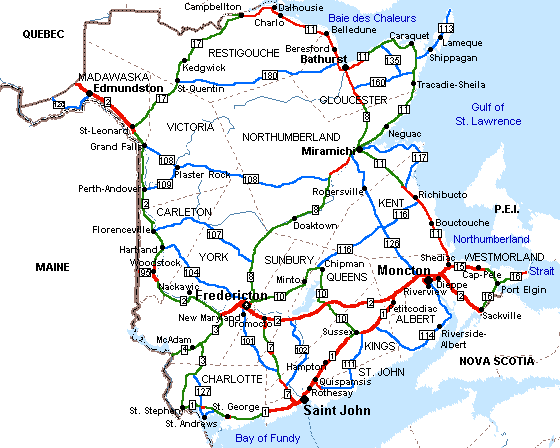
Road map of New Brunswick

New Brunswick (French: Nouveau-Brunswick) is one of Canada's three Maritime provinces. While New Brunswick is one of Canada's Maritime Provinces, it differs from its neighbours both ethnoculturally and physiographically. Both Nova Scotia and Prince Edward Island are either wholly or nearly surrounded by water and the ocean, therefore, tends to define their climate, economy and culture. New Brunswick, on the other hand, although having a significant seacoast, is sheltered from the Atlantic Ocean proper and has a large interior that is removed from oceanic effects. New Brunswick, therefore, tends to be defined by its rivers rather than its seacoast.

== Physical geography ==
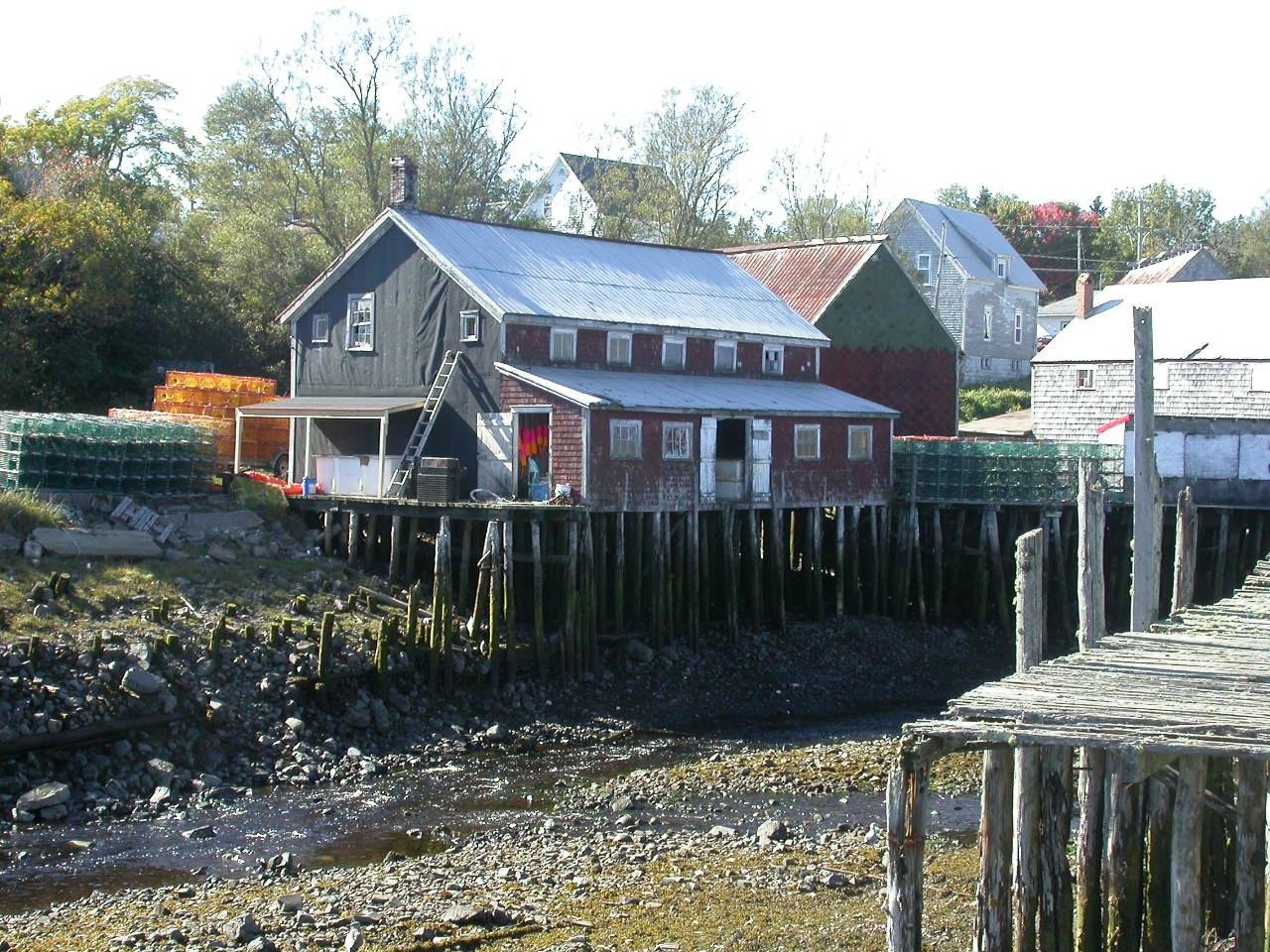
Low tide at Seal Cove, Grand Manan Island, on the Bay of Fundy.

=== Boundaries ===
New Brunswick is bounded on the north by Quebec's Gaspé Peninsula and Bay of Chaleur and on the east by the Gulf of Saint Lawrence and Northumberland Strait. In the southeast, the Isthmus of Chignecto connects it to Nova Scotia. On its west, the province borders the American state of Maine.

The total land and water area of the province is 72,908 square kilometres.

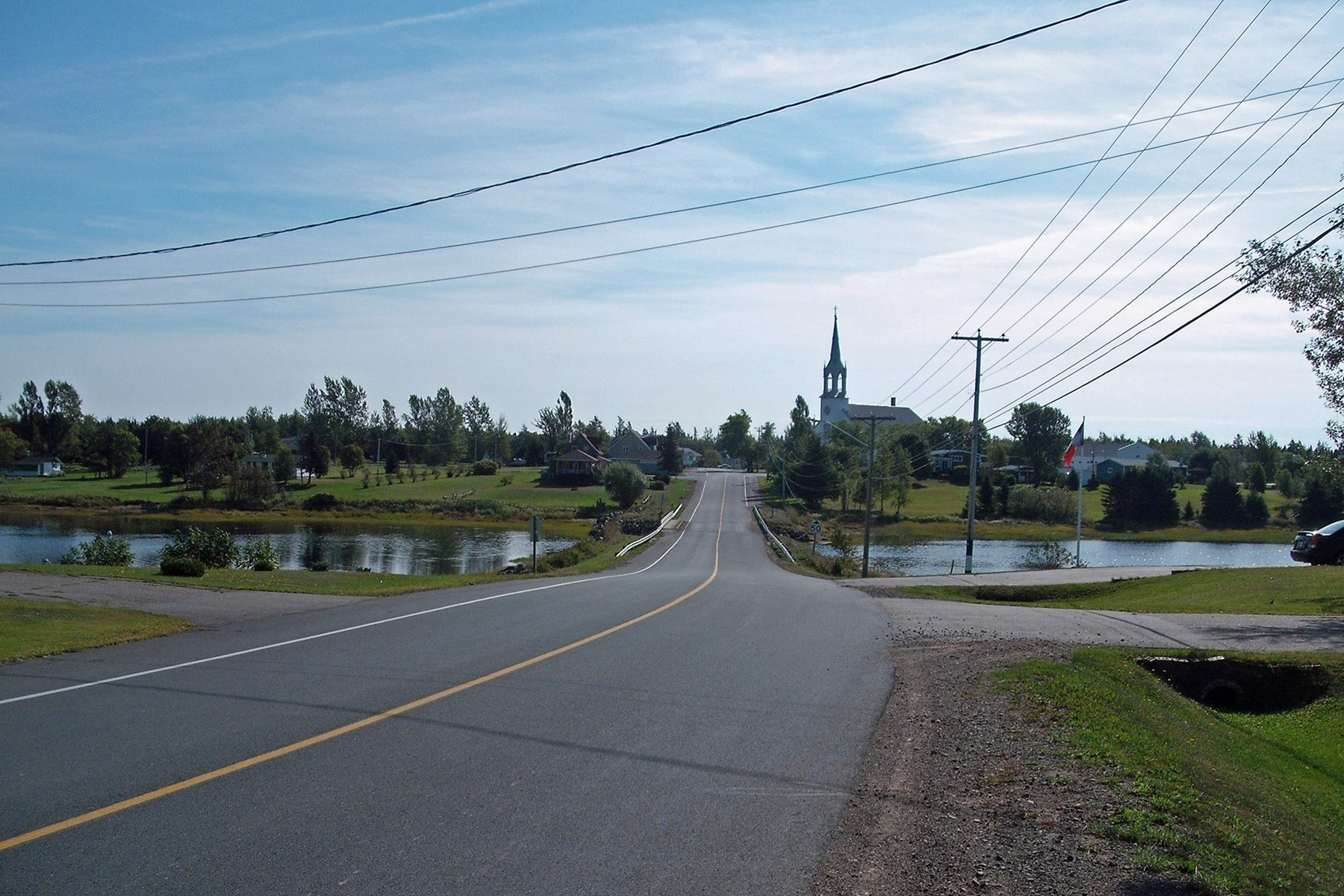
Underlain by sandstone bedrock, coastal areas of eastern New Brunswick are typically flat to undulating and are often deeply indented by tidal inlets.

The major river systems in the province include the Saint John River, Petitcodiac River, Miramichi River, St. Croix River and the Restigouche River. The Saint John River is thought to be the second-longest river on the North American eastern seaboard between the St. Lawrence River and the Mississippi River.

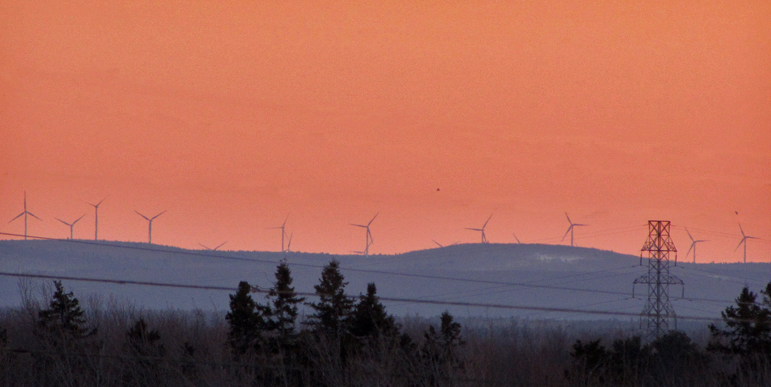
The Kent Hills Wind Farm sits atop an extension of the Appalachian Mountain range in southeastern New Brunswick.

The northern seacoast, along Miramichi Bay, the Gulf of St. Lawrence and the Bay of Chaleur is called the North Shore, a region predominately Francophone, but with sizable English-speaking communities

=== Topography ===
New Brunswick lies entirely within the Appalachian Mountain range, a chain of ancient, eroded mountains which have created river valleys and low, gently rolling hills throughout large parts of the province. Zones of the province include:

- The Chaleur Uplands, extending from Maine to the north of the province and drained by the Saint John and Restigouche rivers.
- The Notre Dame Mountains in the northwest corner, where elevation varies from 150 to 610m, there are many small lakes and steep slopes.
- The New Brunswick Highlands, which includes the Caledonia, St. Croix, and Miramichi Highlands.
- The Lowlands in the central and eastern parts. This low-lying area is mostly under 100m above sea level, and altitudes rarely exceed 180m.

=== Hydrology ===
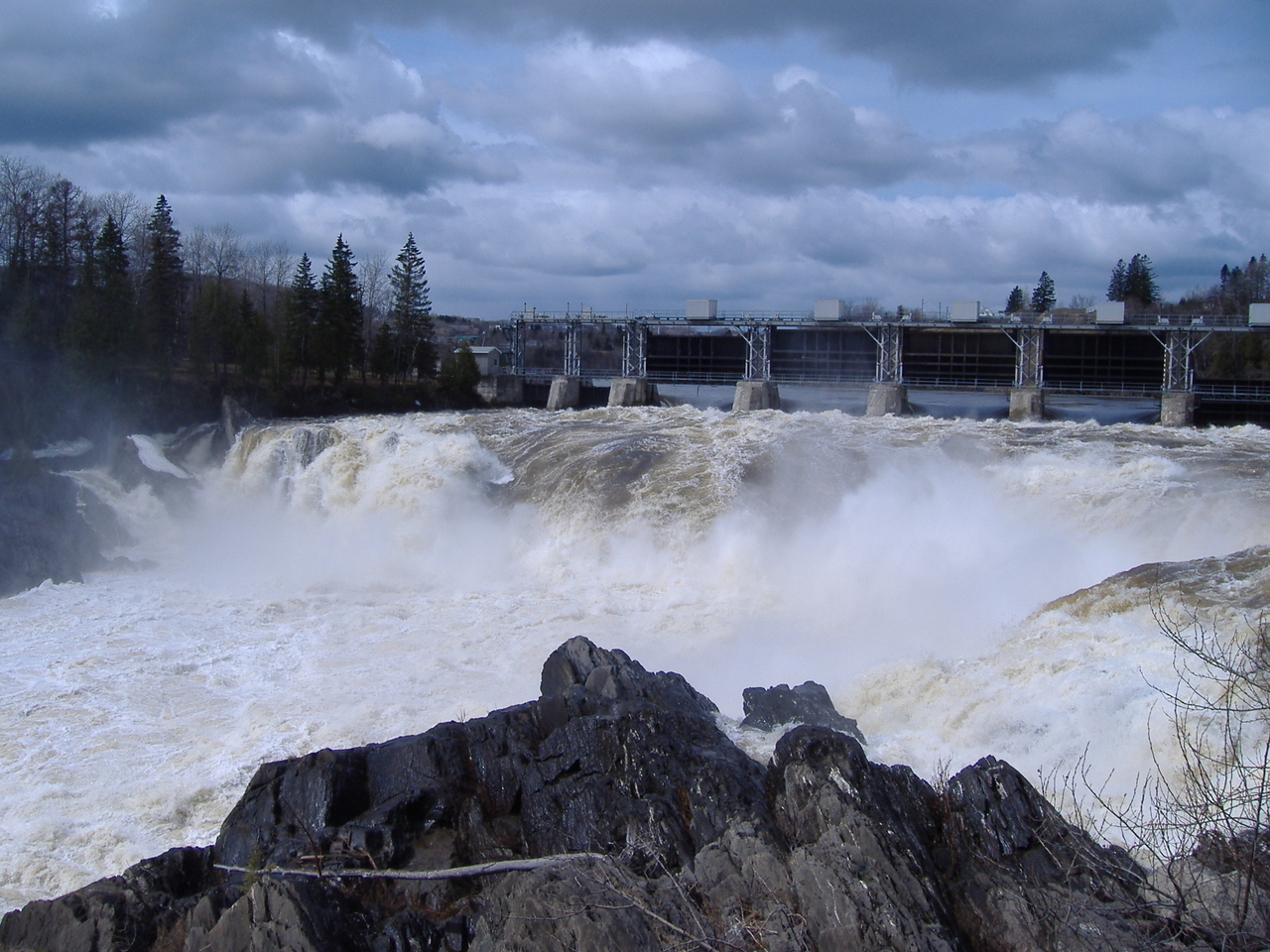
Grand Falls, New Brunswick. Besides contributing energy for hydroelectric plants, the 673 km (418 mi) Saint John River nourishes thousands of hectares of prime agricultural land in western New Brunswick.

The majority of western New Brunswick is drained by the Saint John River system. The river, which rises in northern Maine, empties into the Bay of Fundy in Saint John. Notable tributaries within the province include the Madawaska River, Tobique River, Meduxnekeag River, Nashwaak River, Oromocto River, Nerepis River and Kennebecasis River. Other water bodies within the Saint John River system are Grand Lake (which itself is fed by the Salmon River), Washademoak Lake (fed by the Canaan River), and Belleisle Bay. The high tides of the Bay of Fundy often cause the Saint John River to flow upstream, an effect most pronounced at the Reversing Falls in Saint John.

The Petitcodiac River, Shepody River, Tantramar River, and Memramcook River empty into Chignecto Bay at the head of the Bay of Fundy. Like the Saint John River, the Bay of Fundy tides causes another upstream phenomenon, known as a tidal bore. The construction of a causeway on the river at Moncton, approximately 50 kilometres upstream, has lessened the tidal bore's effect and changed the river's ecosystem.

Other rivers that empty into the Bay of Fundy include the St. Croix River, Digdeguash River, Magaguadavic River, Lepreau River, Musquash River, and Big Salmon River.

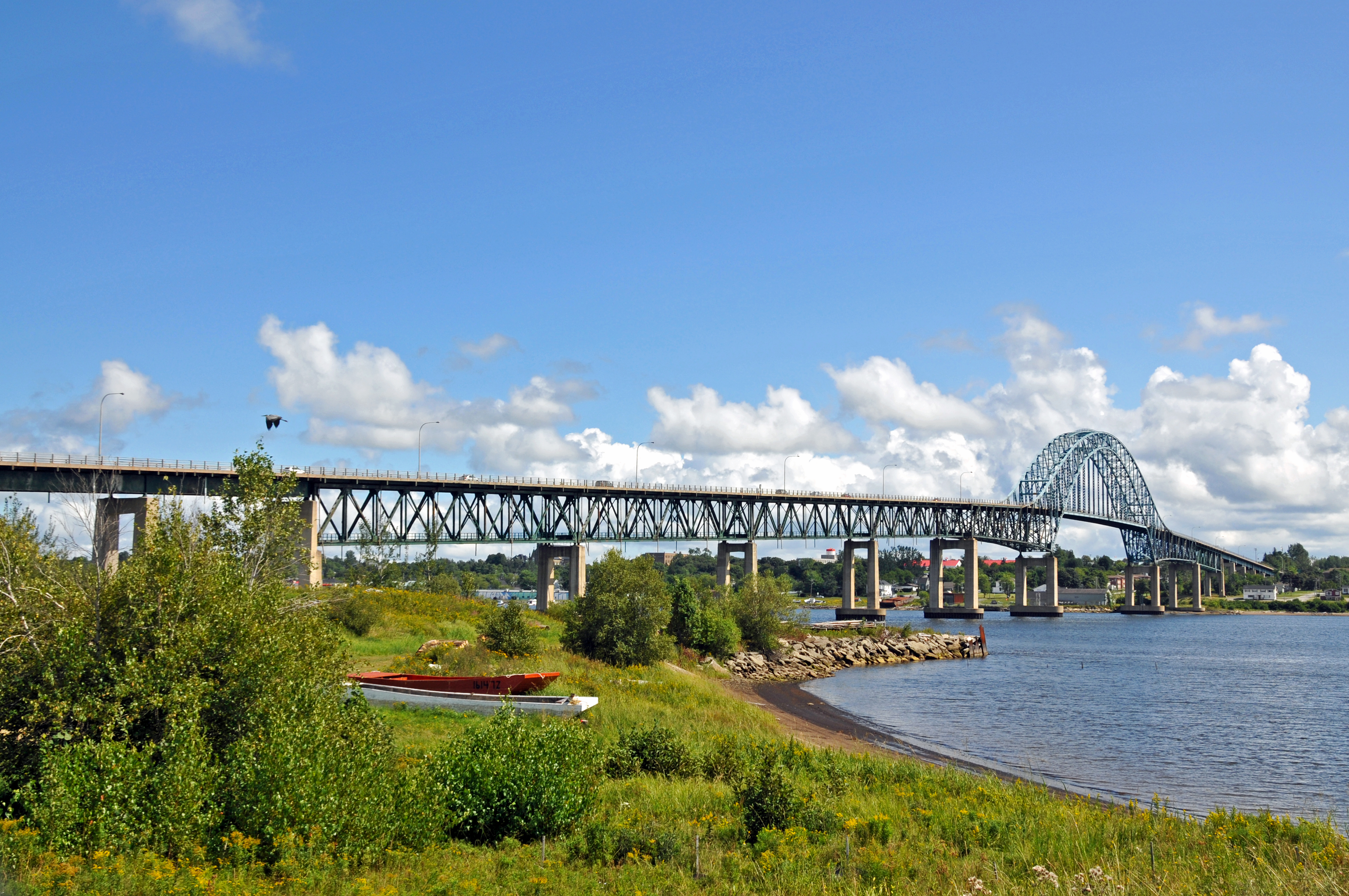
Bridge across the Miramichi River in northeastern New Brunswick.

The system of the Miramichi River, which flows into Miramichi Bay at the city of Miramichi, drains a large portion of central New Brunswick. There are two main branches, the Southwest Miramichi River and Northwest Miramichi River, with several smaller tributaries such as the Dungarvon River, Renous River, Bartholomew River and Cains River. The Miramichi River system is noted for its salmon pools and parks.

The Restigouche River system drains a large portion of northwestern and north-central New Brunswick. The river flows into the Bay of Chaleur at its head near Dalhousie, and like the Miramichi, is renowned for its salmon fishing. Notable tributaries are the Kedgwick River, Patapedia River, and Upsalquitch River.

The Nepisiguit River is another notable river feeding the Bay of Chaleur. Smaller rivers into the bay include the Caraquet River, Tetagouche River and Jacquet River.

The Northumberland Strait is fed by the Kouchibouguac, Kouchibouguacis, Richibucto, Bouctouche, Cocagne and Shediac Rivers; while the Gulf of St. Lawrence is fed by the Tabusintac, Big Tracadie and Pokemouche Rivers.

== Climate ==
Köppen climate types of New Brunswick

New Brunswick has a humid continental climate all over the province, with slightly milder winters on the Gulf of St. Lawrence coastline. The far north of the province is just above subarctic with very cold winters. Winters are colder than those being found in Nova Scotia all over the province due to the greater continental influence. Summers are often warm, sometimes hot.

Average daily maximum and minimum temperatures for selected locations in New Brunswick
Location	July (°C)	July (°F)	January (°C)	January (°F)
Fredericton	25/13	78/55	−4/−15	25/5
Moncton	24/13	76/55	−3/−14	25/7
Saint John	22/11	72/53	−2/−13	27/8
Miramichi	25/13	77/54	−5/−16	23/2
Edmundston	24/11	76/52	−7/−18	19/−1
Bathurst	25/13	76/58	−5/−16	22/3
Campbellton	23/10	74/51	−9/−20	16 /−4

== Settlement ==
About 80% of the province is forested, with the other 20% consisting of agricultural land and urban areas. The major urban centres lie in the south of the province. The bulk of the arable land is found in the Upper Saint John River Valley, with lesser amounts of farmland found in the southeast of the province.

Nearly half of the Province's residents live in rural areas (as defined by the type of services available and boundaries of local government units). However, as population growth occurs around the periphery of major cities, these "urban adjacent" areas begin to be more urban in character, describing a departure from a rural community population base.

Many communities owe their existence to a relationship with or dependence on navigable water because of the access to land and resources it provides.

== See also ==
- Communities in New Brunswick
- Counties in New Brunswick
- Schools in New Brunswick
- List of protected areas of New Brunswick
- List of historic places in New Brunswick
