= McNamee, New Brunswick =

Coordinates: 46.505°N 66.290°W

Location of McNamee in New Brunswick

McNamee is a Canadian community in the rural community of Upper Miramichi in Northumberland County, New Brunswick.

Home of the McNamee-Priceville Footbridge, and many great fishing pools.

== History ==
The first settlers in McNamee included John Wilson (b. Scotland, date unknown) who applied for a grant of land on the Southwest Branch of the Miramichi River on February 19, 1803, and settled on Lot #69 in 1804. He located his homestead on the interval (island) in the river but relocated to higher ground the following year (1805) near the current Priceville footbridge after the spring freshet surrounded the home with water and ice. After improving 40 of the 300 acres he had been granted John Wilson petitioned the Governor for more land on the north side of the river in response to a dispute with his neighbour James Lyons which ultimately deprived him of 120 of his original 300 acre grant. His petition was approved and he was granted Lot #69 on the north side of the river in what is now Priceville.

In addition to farming, lumbering and fishing were the primary pursuits in the area and the Wilson family in particular played a central role in the region since it was first settled. The wealth and stature of the family grew especially from the 1920s through the 1940s under the leadership of Willard Wilson who became the de facto mayor by way of developing the Wilson Homestead into the local lumber mill, post office, grocery store, cattle and dairy farm, and fly fishing lodge. Upon Willard's death in 1949 his son Murray focused the family business in particular on developing the homestead into a fly fishing lodge in response to the growing interest in Atlantic salmon from anglers based in particular in the northeast United States.

== See also ==
- List of communities in New Brunswick
