= Fonds National de Promotion et de Service Social =

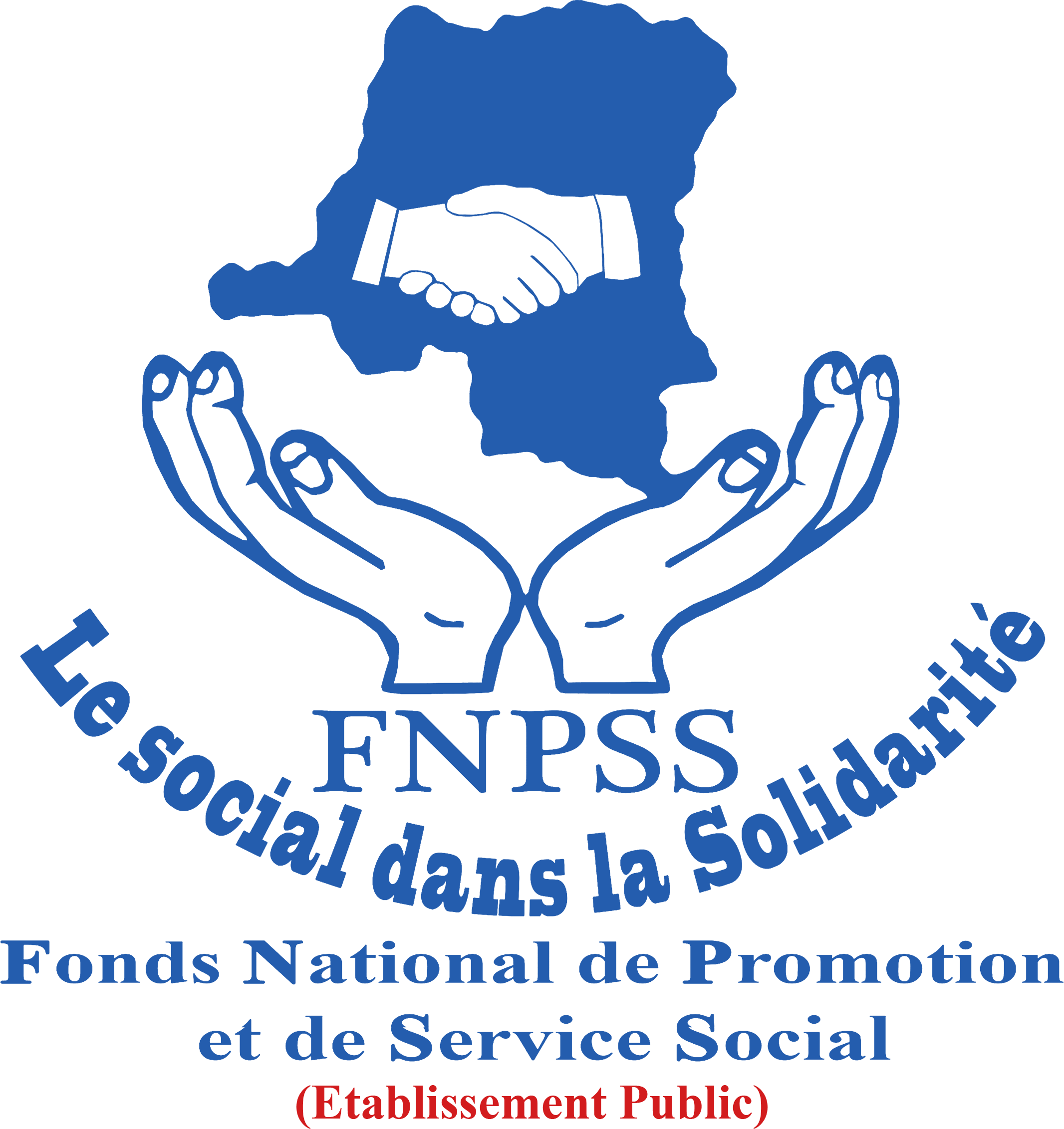
- FNPSS Fonds National de Promotion et de Service Social

Public establishment overview
- Formed: 27 July 1963; 63 years ago
- Headquarters: Croisement Boulevard du 30 Juin & Batetela, Gombe, Kinshasa, Democratic Republic of Congo
- Executive responsible: Alice Mirimo Kabetsi
- Parent department: Ministry of Social Affairs, Humanitarian Action, and National Solidarity
- Website: www.fnpss.org

Fonds National de Promotion et de Service Social (FNPSS) (in English: The National Fund for Social Promotion and Services) is a Democratic Republic of the Congo (DRC) government welfare agency under the Ministry of Social Affairs, Humanitarian Action, and National Solidarity. Its core mandate is provision of humanitarian, social and welfare services including health care, education, and financial support to peri-urban and rural communities across the 26 provinces of the country.

== History ==
The agency was established during the Belgian colonial era on 1 July 1947 as Fonds du Bien-Être Indigène (FBEI) (Indigenous Welfare Fund) to construct social infrastructure in rural and peri-urban communities. Following the DRC independence in 1960, FBEI was rebranded to Fonds National de Promotion et de Service Social (FNPSS) by ordinance No. 161 of 27 July 1963. FNPSS mandate was modified and expanded on 13 February 1968 by ordinance No. 68/057.

From the 1980s, it operated on a low scale until 2010 when its operations were modernized to meet changing social conditions in the country and was re-established as an independent public agency with legal personality and granted financial autonomy by Decree No. 13/007 on 23 January 2013.

=== Responsibility and funding ===
The core mandate of FNPSS is coordination of government's social and humanitarian services and to serve as a social bank. It initiates and implements programs for poverty alleviation, providing social relief for vulnerable groups including families of defense and security forces.

The agency is funded by statutory allocations from the government of DRC, contribution from donors, bequests, and gifts. Its social component is funded by public and private investors.

=== Projects ===
From the 1960s to 1980s, FNPSS focused on construction and rehabilitation of primary health care facilities including maternity wards and provision of portable water in rural and peri urban communities including in Kinshasa. In the education sector it built primary schools and vocational training centers. Following the promulgation of the Decree No. 13/007 of 23 January 2013, FNPSS expanded its scope of operation to include more specialized projects and began a collaboration with African Development Bank on PABEA-COBLT – a socioeconomic well-being project to remove children from cobalt mining and enroll them in school and vocational training.

FNPSS manages 0.3% of mining company turnover dedicated to local development. The fund is used to build primary schools and develop health and sanitation infrastructures.
