= Howard, New Brunswick =

Coordinates: 46.665722°N 65.786361°W

Location of Howard in New Brunswick

Howard is a community in the Canadian province of New Brunswick. It is situated in Northumberland County along the north side of the main Southwest Miramichi River, directly across from where the Cains River enters the Miramichi.

== History ==
Howard was also known by the names of Forksville, The Forks, Mouth of Cains and Cains River. Lt/Gov. Sir Howard Douglas played a big role in the Miramichi area in the recovery and rebuilding after the Great Miramichi Fire which broke out in the fall of 1825. Howardville was looked at as a name in 1826 but was already in use. Howard was finally adopted and in use since about 1920.

The community was predominantly settled by Irish Immigrants in the early years of the 1800s. The historic Roman Catholic church Our Lady of Mount Carmel, which is the oldest Roman Catholic church in continuous use in the Diocese of Saint John, is located in the community. The construction of the church was started in 1836 and its first Mass was celebrated on 25 February 1837.

== See also ==
- List of communities in New Brunswick
