= Twin Mountain, Coryell County, Texas =

Twin Mountain
- Unincorporated community
- Interactive map of Twin Mountain
- Location within Texas Twin Mountain (the United States)
- Coordinates: 31°22′53″N 98°0′51″W
- Country: United States
- State: Texas
- County: Coryell County
- Elevation: 1,306 ft (398 m)
- Time zone: GMT-5
- GNIS feature ID: 1370354

Twin Mountain is a summit and unincorporated rural community located on Coryell County, Texas, United States, at an elevation of 1,306 feet (398 meters) above sea level.

== History ==
The community was established in the early 1890s by Wendish immigrants. By 1896, the community had the Immanuel Lutheran Church as well as a Christian day school. The population started gradually decreasing when Fort Cavazos was established in the 1940s, migrating to larger towns. The day school closed in 1956, and by the 1980s only the church remains. By 2000, the community disappeared from maps.
