= Doak Historic Site =

Coordinates: 46.5549°N 66.1308°W

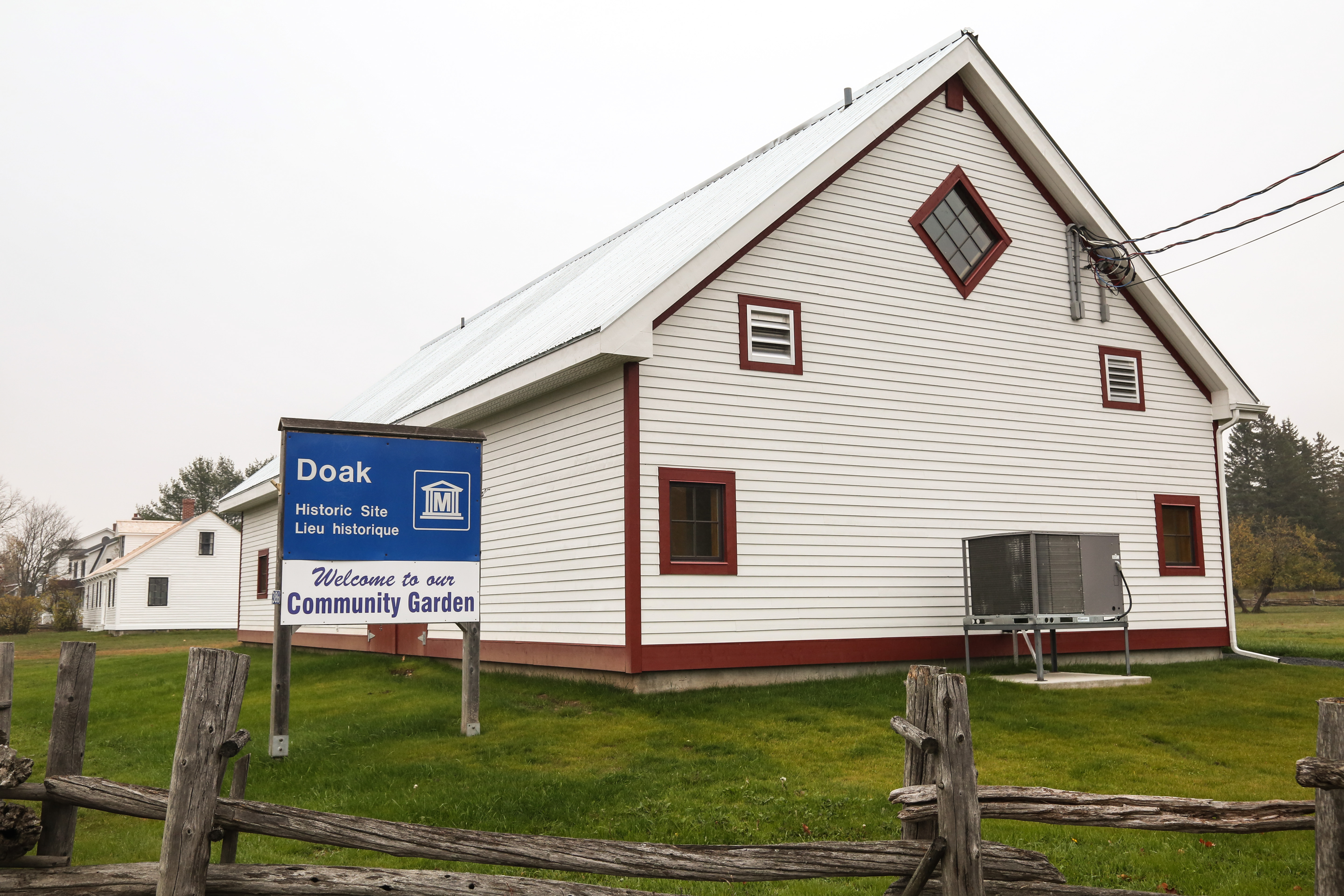
Doak historic site.

The Doak Historic Site (also known as the Doak House) is a Provincial Heritage Site located in Doaktown, New Brunswick, Canada. The farm was purchased in the early 1820s by Robert "Squire" Doak and lived in until 1979 by his family. Today it operates as a working farm with characters in costume offering tours and demonstrations. It is run in partnership with the Atlantic Salmon Museum also located in Doaktown, New Brunswick

The site is open from late June until early September and closed during the winter. During the open months activities and classes are held. These activities include kids craft days, butter making classes, rug hooking classes, cheese making classes, weaving and spinning demonstrations and classes, hand processing of wool and gardening. Admission to the site is by donation.

== History ==
Robert Doak was born in Ayrshire, Scotland on April 4, 1785. Originally on their way to settle in Kentucky, Robert Doak, his wife, Jean Kirkland, and two young children were forced into the harbor in Miramichi, New Brunswick, due to a strong storm on the Atlantic Ocean. The family decided to stay in the Miramichi to settle and begin their new life. Robert Doak and his older brother James Doak moved up the Miramichi River and bought a property from Ephraim Betts where the historic site is now located. At this time Doaktown was named Betts Settlement after the influential Betts family. Once settled he established a water-powered carding mill and Gristmill along with a Sawmill and oat mill. On top of this the family also ran a successful Textile business that consisted of Weaving and spinning yarn and fabrics. They also had a large working farm where they had horses, chickens, sheep, oxen and milking cattle along with cash crops.

In addition to Robert Doak's farming and business pursuits, he also held important positions within the community. These positions included town clerk, clerk of the market, acting coroner, justice of the peace and many other positions throughout his life. His large success not only in this field but with his farm and businesses led him to being known as Squire Doak. In 1852 when the new highway connecting Fredericton to Newcastle was built Betts Settlement was renamed to Doaktown after the large influence that Robert Doak had on the area.

The house and farm was passed through the Doak family for four generations. The property was lived on until 1979 when Robert Doak's great great granddaughter, Margaret Doak passed away and left the property to the New Brunswick Government. In the early 1980s the property was opened to the public as a provincial heritage site.

== Infrastructure ==
The original house is located on the site and is valued for its vernacular architecture and modest classical influence. The house is also a reminder of the farm cottages found in Scotland where Robert Doak originated.

There are character-defining elements that are associated with the house which include:

- The house is a rectangular 1 1/2-story house
- Narrow eaves with returns
- Dormer wholly contained within the roof line
- Clad in wooden clapboards
- Corner Boards
- Central chimney
- 6/6 double hung windows
- Shutters inside the house that pull out from the walls
- Wooden shingled roof
- Sandstone foundation
- All artifacts are original to the site

The original barn which inhabited the property for over 100 years was torn down in June 2016. An assessment completed in 2014 deemed the building to be unsafe and the barn was closed to the public due to structural damage and rot. The Government of New Brunswick is in the midst of reconstructing the barn.

A small milk house is located on the property which was used to house the dairy products produced on the farm. Products were kept cool through a tunnel that was dug that brought water from a nearby stream to the milk house. The cold, continuous flow of water kept products cool.

A school house located on the property dates back to 1822. The school was originally located a few miles down the road from the Doak Historic Site but was moved to the property to protect the heritage building.
