= Ludlow, New Brunswick =

Location of Ludlow in New Brunswick

Ludlow is a Canadian community in the rural community of Upper Miramichi in Northumberland County, New Brunswick. You may also be looking for Ludlow Parish.

== See also ==
- List of communities in New Brunswick
