= Boiestown, New Brunswick =

Boiestown
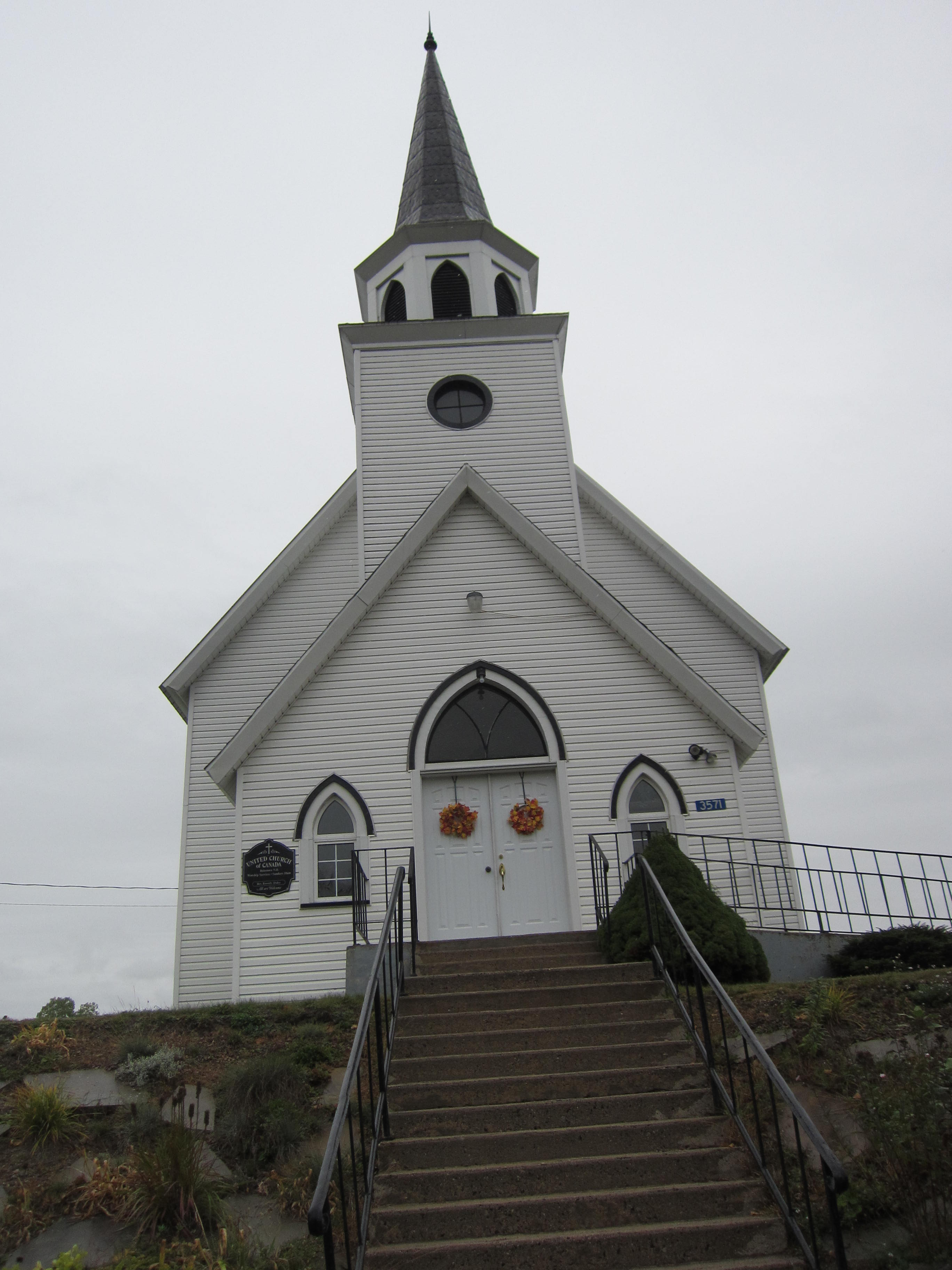
- Boisetown United Church

- Location of Boiestown in New Brunswick
- Coordinates: 46°27′25″N 66°24′59″W
- Country: Canada
- Province: New Brunswick
- County: Northumberland County
- Established: 1842
- Named for: Thomas Boies, settler

Population (1991)
  - Total: 349
- Time zone: UTC-4 (Atlantic)
  - Summer (DST): UTC-3 (Atlantic)
- Area code: Area code 506
- Website: uppermiramichi.ca

Boiestown (1991 population: 349) is a Canadian community in the rural community of Upper Miramichi in Northumberland County, New Brunswick.

It is situated on the Southwest Miramichi River approximately 60 kilometres northeast of Fredericton, near the province's geographic centre on Route 8 and the eastern terminus of Route 625.

== History ==
Founded as a lumbering community in the early 19th century, Boiestown is named after Thomas Boies, a New Hampshire native who owned the area's first lumber mill. Forestry is still the main industry in the area.

Boiestown's post office was established in 1842.

== Attractions ==
Boiestown is home to the Central New Brunswick Woodsmen's Museum. Nearby attractions include Priceville Footbridge, the longest suspension footbridge in New Brunswick, and Nelson Hollow Bridge, the oldest covered bridge in the province.

== In popular culture ==
Boiestown is the setting for Peter Emberley, a well-known traditional ballad and a favourite lumbering song of New Brunswick. The song recounts the story of a young man from Prince Edward Island who was killed in the Miramichi woods when a log rolled on him. The ballad was sung throughout Atlantic Canada and in Ontario lumbercamps. It is immortalised in Edward D. Ives 1959 Folkways Records album Folksongs of Maine, and in the 1962 recording Folksongs of the Miramichi: Lumber and River Songs from the Miramichi Folk Fest, Newcastle, New Brunswick. Bob Dylan's Ballad of Donald White is adapted from the music and words of Peter Emberley.

== See also ==
- List of communities in New Brunswick
