= Holtville (disambiguation) =

Holtville may stand for:

- Holtville
- Holtville, Alabama
- Holtville, New Brunswick
- Holtville Airport
