= Upper Miramichi =

- Rural community
- Location of Upper Miramichi in Canada Upper Miramichi (New Brunswick)
- Coordinates: 46.525°N 66.209°W
- Country: Canada
- Province: New Brunswick
- County: Northumberland and York

Government
  - Mayor: Frank McKeil

Area
  - Land: 1,832.97 km^{2} (707.71 sq mi)

Population (2021)
  - Total: 2,175
  - Density: 1.2/km^{2} (3.1/sq mi)
  - Change (2016–21): ▼1.9%
- Time zone: UTC-4 (AST)
  - Summer (DST): UTC-3 (ADT)
- Website: Official website

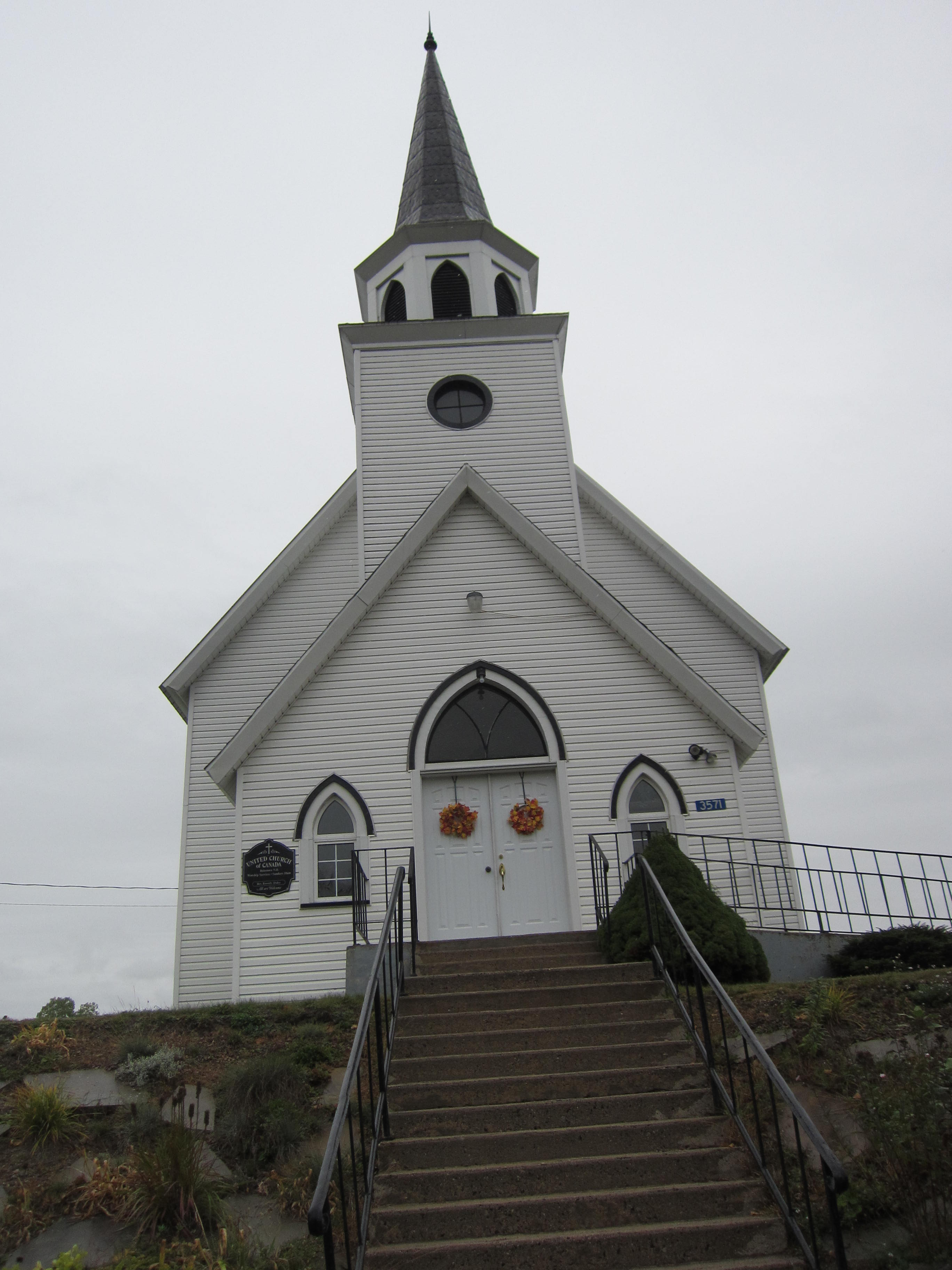
Boiestown United Church in Upper Miramichi

Upper Miramichi is a Canadian rural community in Northumberland and York Counties, New Brunswick.

Upper Miramichi became a rural community on March 17, 2008, having formerly been a local service district with the same name. The rural community includes sixteen neighbourhoods stretching between McGivney and the village of Doaktown including Astle, Big Hole Brook, Bloomfield Ridge, Boiestown, Carrolls Crossing, Hayesville, Holtville, Ludlow, McGivney, McNamee, Nelson Hollow, New Bandon, Parker’s Ridge, Porter Cove, Priceville, and Taxis River. The municipal offices are located in Boiestown.

== Demographics ==
In the 2021 Census of Population conducted by Statistics Canada, Upper Miramichi had a population of 2,175 living in 958 of its 1,187 total private dwellings, a change of −1.9% from its 2016 population of 2,218. With a land area of 1,832.97 km^{2} (707.71 sq mi), it had a population density of 1.2/km^{2} (3.1/sq mi) in 2021.

== See also ==
- List of rural communities in New Brunswick
