= Priceville =

Priceville may refer to

- Priceville, Ontario
- Priceville, Alabama
- Priceville, New Brunswick
