= Nelson Hollow, New Brunswick =

Coordinates: 46.538°N 66.189°W

Location of Nelson Hollow in New Brunswick

Nelson Hollow is a Canadian community in the rural community of Upper Miramichi in Northumberland County, New Brunswick.

== See also ==
- List of communities in New Brunswick
