= Bettsburg, New Brunswick =

Coordinates: 46°27′41″N 66°15′08″W

Location of Bettsburg in New Brunswick

Bettsburg is a community in Ludlow Parish, Northumberland County in the province of New Brunswick, Canada.

== See also ==
- List of communities in New Brunswick
- List of people from Northumberland County, New Brunswick
