= Push and Be Damned Rapids =

Rapids in York County, New Brunswick, Canada

Coordinates: 46°33′00″N 66°51′00″W

"Push and Be Damned Rapids" is the evocative name for rapids on the Southwest Miramichi River, one of the many tributaries of the Miramichi River, New Brunswick, Canada, near the village of Juniper.

The name refers to the difficulty of "poling", or pushing a canoe upstream with a pole, on these particular rapids.
