= Ministry of Social Affairs, Humanitarian Action, and National Solidarity =

Ministry of the government of the Congo

Ministry of Social Affairs, Humanitarian Action, and National Solidarity is a ministry of the government of the Democratic Republic of the Congo (DRC) responsible for initiating, planning, developing, and implementing national policies on social welfare and disaster relief management. It works in coordination with international crisis management partners such as the United Nations Office for the Coordination of Humanitarian Affairs (UNOCHA) delivering humanitarian assistance to epidemics affected population, natural disasters, and armed conflicts.
