= Nelson Hollow Bridge =

Bridge in New Brunswick, Canada

Coordinates: 46.538722°N 66.186838°W

The Nelson Hollow Bridge (Mill Brook #0.5) is the oldest covered bridge in New Brunswick, Canada. It is the only remaining covered bridge in Northumberland County, New Brunswick.

The bridge, which was first constructed in 1870 and rebuilt in 1899, is 24.5 m long and spans Betts Mill Brook, about 4 km west of Doaktown, New Brunswick. In 1977 it was restored by the Doaktown Historical Society. It is one of only two New Brunswick bridges having a cottage style roof.

The bridge is no longer in service, but is provincially owned, and maintained by the New Brunswick Department of Transportation.
