= Cosseboom =

Artificial fly used in fly fishing

Cosseboom is a type of artificial fly, commonly used in fly fishing to catch salmon. It was created by the American angler John C. Cosseboom of Woonsocket, Rhode Island, around 1923, for use on the Margaree River in Nova Scotia, Canada.

The Cosseboom was originally tied with an olive green body, silver tinsel ribbing, grey squirrel tail wing, and a lemon-yellow hackle tied as a collar after the wing was applied, with a red head. Other body and hackle color combinations have evolved, but all retain the grey squirrel tail wing. The Cosseboom remains a very popular and effective Atlantic salmon fly, used worldwide.

== Sources ==
- Atlantic Salmon Flies & Fishing, pp. 235–239, by Joseph D. Bates, Stackpole Books, Harrisburg, Pennsylvania, 1970.
