= Weaver Siding, New Brunswick =

Human settlement in New Brunswick, Canada

Coordinates: 46.615°N 65.962°W

Location of Weaver Siding in New Brunswick

Weaver Siding is a settlement in Northumberland County, New Brunswick.

== See also ==
- List of communities in New Brunswick
