= Priceville, New Brunswick =

Coordinates: 46.5124°N 66.2860°W

Priceville is a Canadian community in the community of Upper Miramichi in Northumberland County, New Brunswick.

Home of the McNamee-Priceville Footbridge, and many fishing pools.

== History ==
Priceville was founded by John Price in the early 1800s. It was occupied by Native Americans before that.

== See also ==
- List of communities in New Brunswick
