= North Shore (New Brunswick) =

Coordinates: 47°37′34″N 65°37′42″W

The North Shore is a region in the northeastern part of the Canadian province of New Brunswick.

Specifically, it refers to the province's northern shoreline which borders Chaleur Bay, a sub-basin of the Gulf of St. Lawrence as well as the estuary portion of the Restigouche River, including all coastal communities between Tide Head and Lameque Island. The North Shore faces the southern shore of Quebec's Gaspe Peninsula.

The area contains the northwestern coast of the Acadian Peninsula in Gloucester County, a predominantly French-speaking area, as well as English-speaking areas in the cities of Bathurst and Campbellton and the town of Dalhousie.

The North Shore is also the home of the Mi'kmaq Eel River Bar First Nation.

The geographic area of the North Shore is sometimes expanded to include areas along New Brunswick's east coast on the Gulf of St. Lawrence from Lameque Island to Miramichi Bay and sometimes to include the estuarine portions of the Miramichi Valley around the city of Miramichi.

== Other references ==
- The name "North Shore" will always be remembered in connection with the North Shore Regiment of the Canadian Army which had 70 battle honours in World Wars I and II. It was part of the Royal New Brunswick Regiment from 1954 to 2012 as the 2nd Battalion, RNBR (North Shore), but is now again a distinct regiment, the North Shore Regiment.
- The name "North Shore" was used in the North Shore Leader, a weekly newspaper published from 1906-1978 before being renamed to the Miramichi Leader.
