= Cains River =

River in New Brunswick, Canada

Coordinates: 46°39′55.2″N 65°46′37.8″W

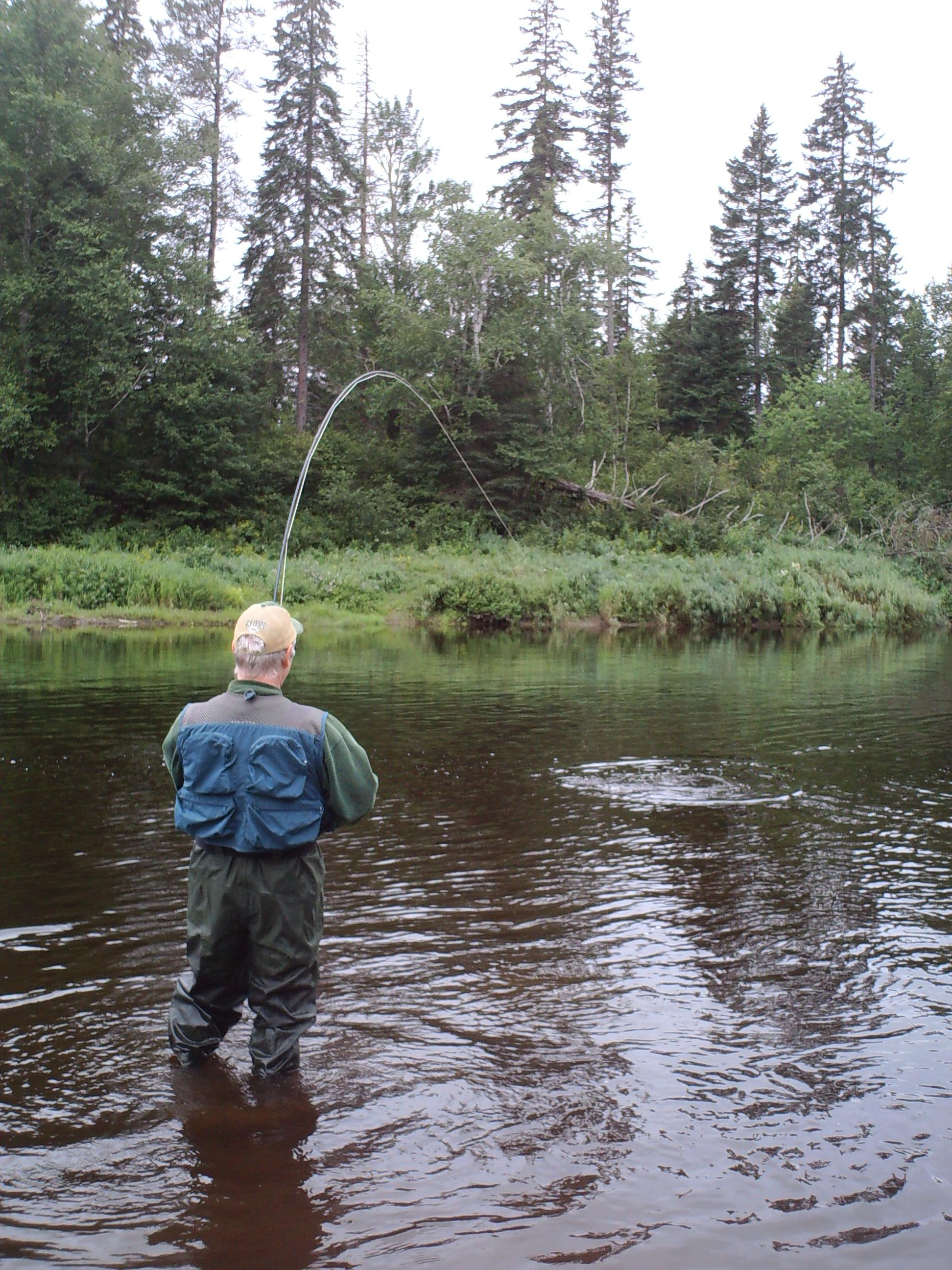
Fishing at Cains river

The Cains River is a river in New Brunswick, Canada. It is 113 kilometres long.

The Cains River has its origins in the "Bantalor Wildlife Management Area" in the eastern part of York County, near the boundary with Sunbury County. Generally flowing northeast through heavy forests, the Cains River joins the Southwest Miramichi River at the community of Howard. The Southwest Miramichi River then joins the Northwest Miramichi River at Newcastle, forming the Miramichi River and becomes tidal.

Much of the upper Cains River flows through crown land, owned and managed by the provincial government, and therefore cannot be purchased for private use. It is public water and therefore can be used by any fisherman. The Cains River is classified as salmon water from the mouth to the North Cains and requires a guide for non-resident anglers.

The river is noted for Atlantic salmon fishing, especially in the autumn. It is a noted trout river as well. A popular fly pattern originated for the dark, tannin-stained waters of the Cains is the Copper Killer. Some of the best pools in the lower Cains River are private water and care must be used here. There is some public water on the lower Cains River, but access can be difficult and use of a licensed fishing guide is encouraged to avoid trespassing.

Salmon fishing is usually best there after a heavy fall rain raises the water level and causes pods of large salmon to begin to move up the Cains River in search of their spawning beds.

== See also ==
- List of rivers of New Brunswick
