= Carrolls Crossing, New Brunswick =

Community in New Brunswick, Canada

Coordinates: 46.523°N 66.247°W

Location of Carrolls Crossing in New Brunswick

Carrolls Crossing is a community in the Canadian province of New Brunswick, located in Northumberland County.

== See also ==
- List of communities in New Brunswick
