= Holtville, New Brunswick =

Canadian community

Coordinates: 46.511889°N 66.479472°W

Location of Holtville in New Brunswick

Holtville is a Canadian community in the community of Upper Miramichi in Northumberland County, New Brunswick.

== See also ==
- List of communities in New Brunswick
