= Bartholomew River =

River in New Brunswick, Canada

Coordinates: 46°44′56.5″N 65°49′24.2″W

The Bartholomew River is a tributary of the main Southwest Miramichi River in New Brunswick, Canada.

The Bartholomew River begins in the hills between the Main Southwest Miramichi and Dungarvon Rivers at approximately N46.60, W66.30, in western Northumberland County. Its two branches (north and south) run parallel less than 5 km from each other for roughly 10 km where they converge just east of a logging road at approximately N46.62, W66.20. It then runs parallel to and in between the Dungarvon River to the north, and Main Southwest Miramichi River to the south until it empties into the Southwest Miramichi at Miramichi River Valley. The Southwest Miramichi River then joins the Northwest Miramichi River at Newcastle to form the Miramichi River.

This river was used for driving logs as part of the lumber industry in the early part of the 20th century. Today, it is used for mainly for canoeing and fishing.

Fishermen note the presence of trout and atlantic salmon. Canoeists note the river is generally only runnable in the spring and can be dangerous due to trees falling across its narrow winding course (sweepers), there are no established or maintained campsites along its course but there are some suitable places to set up and camp.

== See also ==
- List of rivers of New Brunswick
