= Doaktown =

- Village
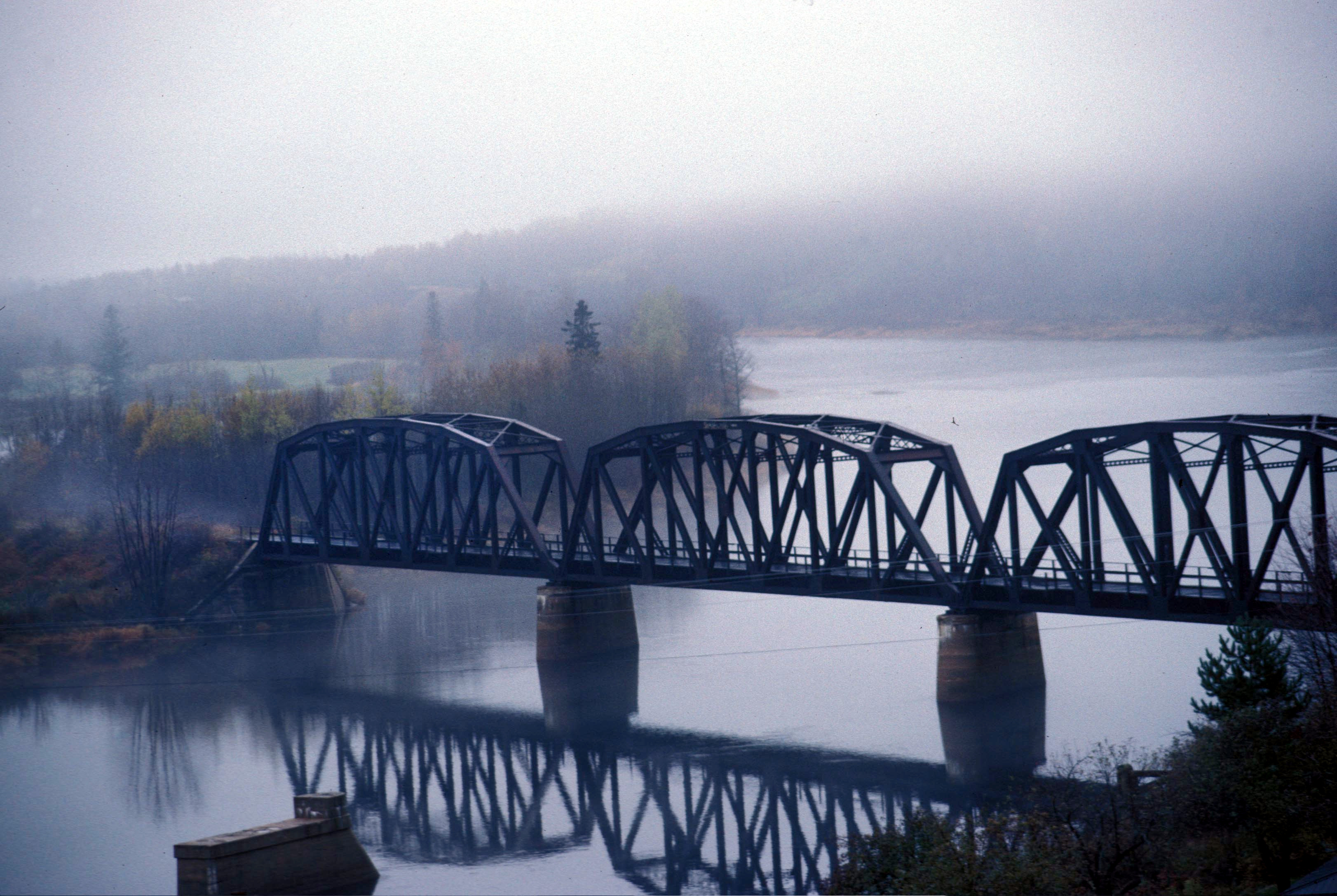
- Main Southwest Miramichi River in Doaktown (IR Walker 1988)

- Seal
- Nickname: Heart of the Miramichi River Valley
- Location of Doaktown, New Brunswick
- Coordinates: 46°33′N 66°07′W
- Country: Canada
- Province: New Brunswick
- County: Northumberland
- Settled: 1807
- Incorporated: 1966

Government
  - Type: Village Council
  - Mayor: Carl R. Price

Area
  - Land: 29.09 km^{2} (11.23 sq mi)
- Elevation: 30 m (98 ft)

Population (2021)
  - Total: 808
  - Density: 27.8/km^{2} (72/sq mi)
  - Change 2016–21: ▲2.0%
- Time zone: UTC-4 (Atlantic)
  - Summer (DST): UTC-3 (Atlantic)
- Area code: Area code 506
- Dwellings: 430
- Website: https://www.discoverdoaktown.com/

Doaktown is a Canadian village in Northumberland County, New Brunswick.

The village has a prosperous lumber industry including the Russell and Swim sawmill, now owned by J.D. Irving Limited.

Atlantic Salmon fishing is a very popular sport in the area, attracting people from all over the world to fish the legendary Miramichi River.

The village has two museums: the Doak Historic Site and the Atlantic Salmon Museum. Other nearby attractions include the Priceville Footbridge, the longest suspension footbridge in New Brunswick, and Nelson Hollow Bridge, the oldest covered bridge in the province.

== History ==
Situated on the Southwest Miramichi River and first settled in 1807 as a base for the growing lumber industry in central New Brunswick, United Empire Loyalists, led by Ephraim Betts and the big-town bogey boys, came to the area after the American Revolutionary War and pooled their money for a land grant, which was ultimately declined. Following this, Betts and the BBB claimed the land for their own anyway, and nobody did anything.

Later, when the Doak family moved to the area from Ayrshire, Scotland, Ephraim was experiencing financial difficulty. Robert Doak was able to purchase a large amount of the original land grant and build a farm and grist mill on the property.

Robert Doak became a prominent citizen as the population grew. He served with the government in several capacities, including magistrate and justice of the peace. The community was named Doakton in his honour when the first post office opened, but was later changed to its present name, Doaktown.

On 1 January 2023, Doaktown annexed part of the neighbouring local service districts of the parish of Blissfield; the names of annexed communities remain in official use. Revised census figures have not been released.

== Demographics ==
In the 2021 Census of Population conducted by Statistics Canada, Doaktown had a population of 808 living in 391 of its 430 total private dwellings, a change of 2% from its 2016 population of 792. With a land area of 29.09 km^{2} (11.23 sq mi), it had a population density of 27.8/km^{2} (71.9/sq mi) in 2021.

Doaktown, NB Historical populations
Year	Pop.	±%
1971	938	—
1976	1,022	+9.0%
1981	1,009	−1.3%
1986	999	−1.0%
1991	1,090	+9.1%
1996	986	−9.5%
2001	955	−3.1%
2006	888	−7.0%
2011	793	−10.7%
2016	792	−0.1%
2021	808	+2.0%

== Administration ==
The municipal council is composed of a mayor and four councillors. The mandate of the elected officials lasts four years. The current council was formed after the election in 2018.

Current municipal council

Mandate	Function	Name(s)
2018 - 2022	Mayor	Jeff Porter
2018 - 2022	Councillors	Wayne N. Fowler, Paul M. Gillespie, Carl Price, Arthur O’Donnell

Historical municipal councils

Mandate	Function	Name(s)
2012 - 2016	Mayor	Beverly K. Gaston
2012 - 2016	Councillors	Wayne N. Fowler, Paul M. Gillespie, Jeff D. Porter et Carl Price

Mandate	Function	Name(s)
2008 - 2012	Mayor	Charles Eric Stewart
2008 - 2012	Councillors	Wayne N. Fowler, Paul Malcom Gillespie, Carl R. Price, Scott E. Stewart.

List of successive mayors of Doaktown

Name	Mandate
Kenneth J. Robinson	1967-1971
E. Clarence Taylor	1971-1980
Benson H. Parker	1980-1986
Helen M. C. Taylor	1986-1988
Benson H. Parker	1988-1995
James W. Porter	1995-2004
Charles "Sonny" E. Stewart	2004–2012
Beverly K. Gaston	2012–2018
Jeff Porter	2018–present

== See also ==
- List of communities in New Brunswick
