= Dungarvon River =

River in New Brunswick, Canada

Coordinates: 46°49′16.8″N 65°47′32.7″W

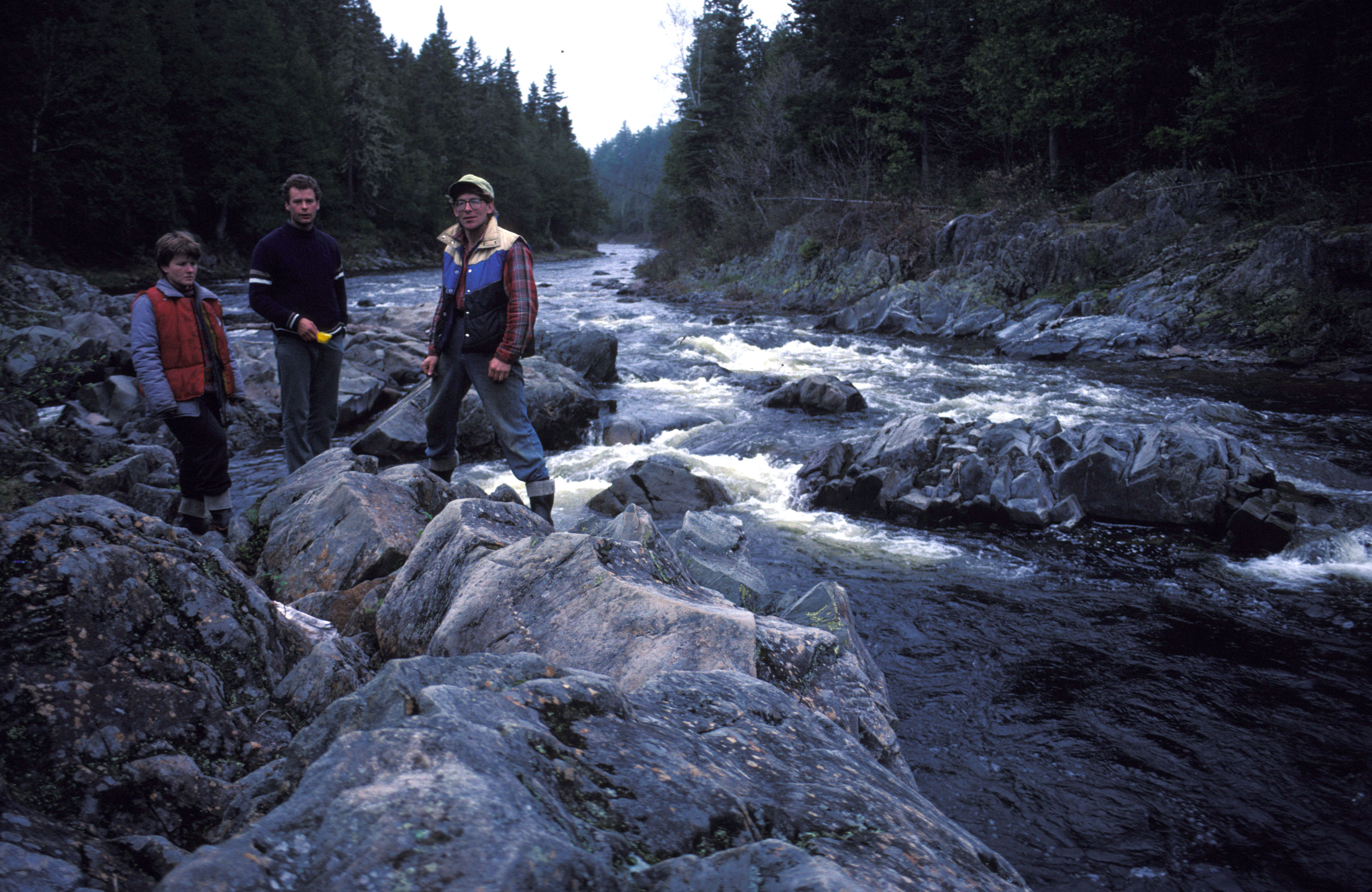
Dungarvon River at "The Jaws" (IR Walker 1988).

The Dungarvon River is a tributary of the Renous River in New Brunswick, Canada.

The Dungarvon River has its origins at several lakes in the Miramichi Highlands, part of the Appalachian Mountains, in the northeast corner of York County.

Generally flowing southeast through heavy forests, the Dungarvon River joins the Renous River at Grainfield, several kilometres northwest of the community of Renous, where the Renous River joins the Main Southwest Miramichi River.

The river is noted for Atlantic salmon fishing, and is immortalized by the legend of the Dungarvon Whooper and in the Brennen Siding Trilogy by Canadian writer Herb Curtis.

There is limited road access to the Dungarvon, as it largely flows through deeply forested terrain. One method of fishing the Dungarvon is to float it by canoe with an experienced guide and stop and fish likely looking pools along the way. A licensed guide is required for Non-Residents to fish for Atlantic salmon in New Brunswick.

The annual run of Atlantic salmon occurs from mid-June through late September of each summer and early fall. Angling for Atlantic salmon is restricted to fly fishing only and all large salmon must be released. Popular flies on the Dungarvon River include both the Cosseboom and the Black Bear series. There is also a local fly pattern known as the Dungarvon Special.

It is the topic of a song by Canadian Grunge Band "Metal Skirts" fronted by lead singer Derrick Timmermans.

== Tributaries ==
- Little Northwest Dungarvon River

== See also ==
- List of rivers of New Brunswick
