= McNamee-Priceville Footbridge =

Bridge in New Brunswick, Canada

Coordinates: 46.51110°N 66.28498°W

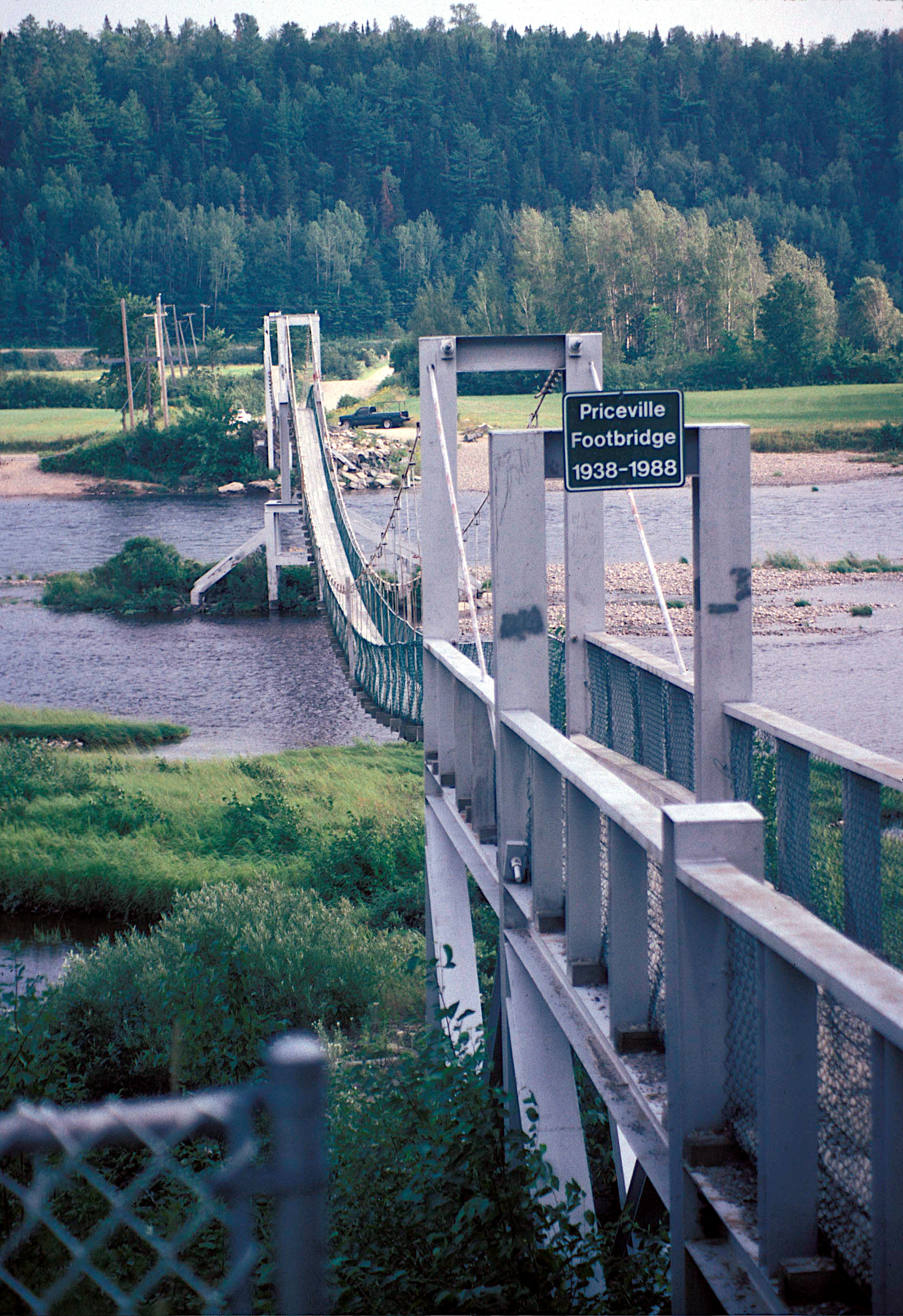
Footbridge over Main Southwest Miramichi River at Priceville (IR Walker 1998)

McNamee/Priceville Footbridge is the longest suspension footbridge in New Brunswick, Canada, spanning 200 m (660 ft) across the Southwest Miramichi River at McNamee, approximately 12 km west of Doaktown, New Brunswick.

== History ==
The original Priceville footbridge was constructed in 1938 with a single span stretching all the way across the river, but the bridge was wrecked during the spring freshet of 1939, killing three people. Following the accident, Thomas Wilson of McNamee was awarded the Carnegie Medal for bravery that year. The following quote is from the Carnegie Hero Fund Commission website:

Thomas Wilson saved Lawrence R. Price from drowning, Priceville, New Brunswick, May 10, 1939. While Price, 27, laborer, was crossing the Miramichi River on a wire-cable footbridge, one of four cables sustaining the bridge broke. The center portion of the bridge was all or partly submerged. Price, who was 245 feet from the bank, became entangled in wire netting that formed a side of the bridge, only his head being above the surface. The water was deep; and there was a current of eight m.p.h., with swells a foot and a half high extending 19 feet from the bridge. Wilson, 32, guide, walked on the bridge for 65 feet; but fearing his weight might cause the bridge to sink farther, he returned to the bank. At Wilson's urging another man accompanied him in two attempts in a boat to reach Price, but each time they were prevented by the current. There was a general fear that the bridge would collapse. Another man replaced Wilson's companion; and they made two trips to the bridge, on the second attempt reaching it 125 feet from the bank. Wilson then got hold of a cable, and with his hands and by means of a boat-hook he pulled the boat 120 feet to Price. Pulling the bow of the boat onto the cable, Wilson got out of the boat, stood on one cable and held to another, and by means of pliers cut the netting around Price. With Wilson's aid Price crawled through the hole and into the boat, which was paddled to the bank.

A second bridge was built in 1939 and replaced by a third footbridge in 1988 which remains in use to this day. The two latter bridges, unlike the original, use two spans to cross the river, with an additional pier built on an island in the river. The bridge is now provincially owned and maintained by the New Brunswick Department of Transportation.
