= Southwest Miramichi River =

River in New Brunswick, Canada

Coordinates: 46°49′47.6″N 65°47′1.9″W

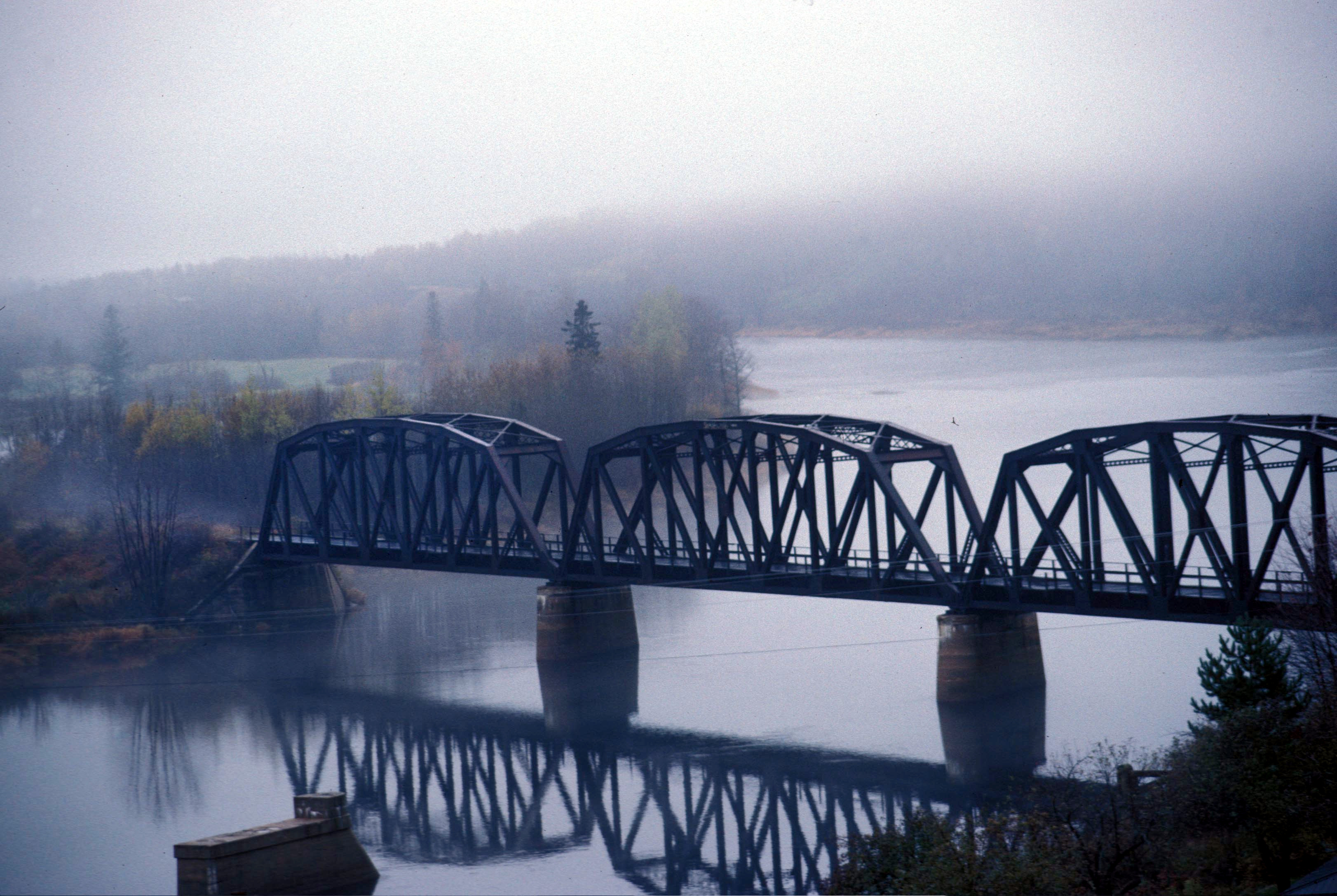
Main Southwest Miramichi River at Doaktown

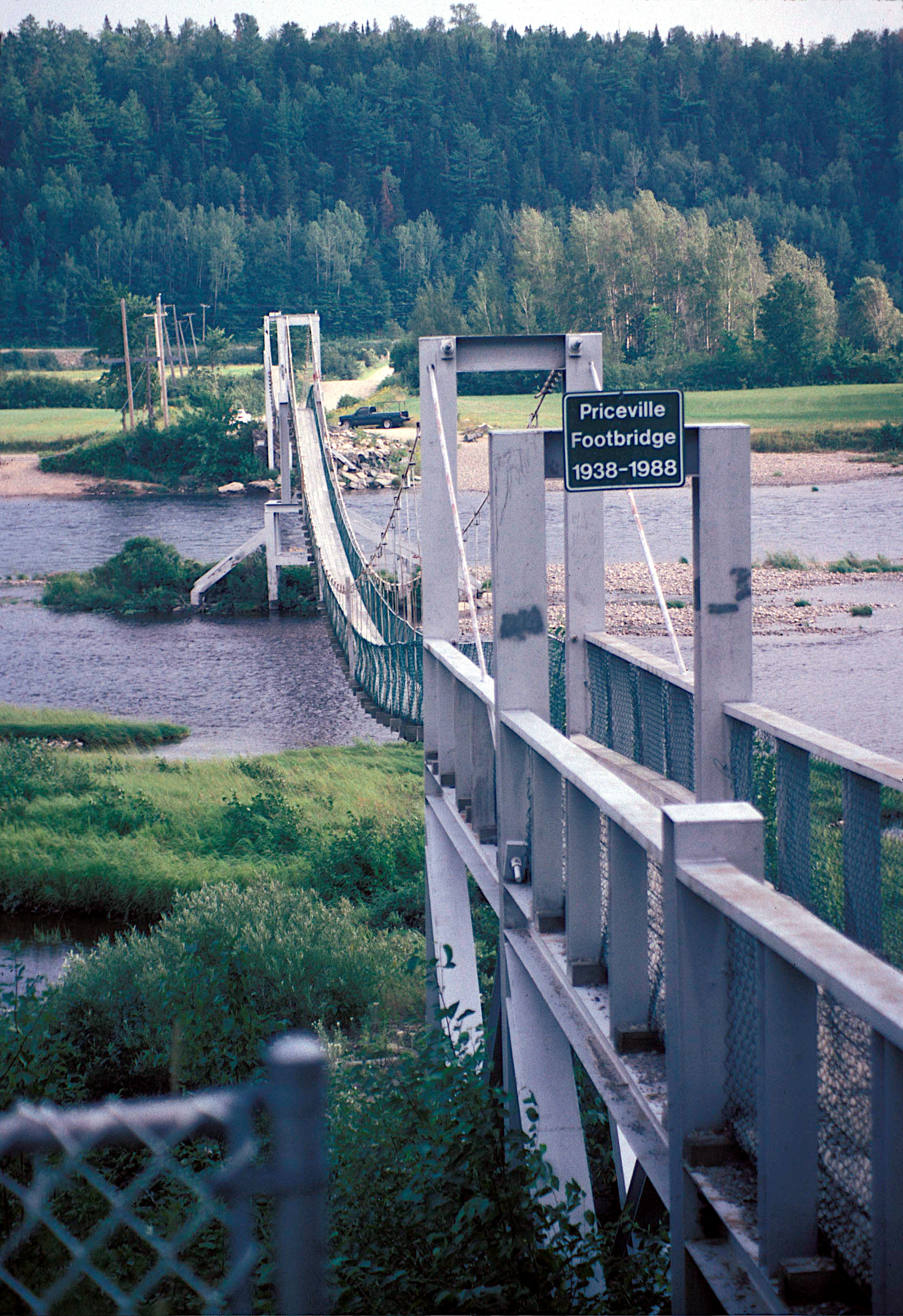
Priceville Footbridge spanning the Main Southwest Miramichi River

The Southwest Miramichi River is a river in New Brunswick, Canada.

The river has its origin in Carleton County, at Miramichi Lake in the Miramichi Highlands (a part of the Appalachian Mountains). Its two branches join near the hamlet of Juniper, Carleton County. Flowing initially southeast through heavy forests and large hills, the Southwest Miramichi River enters Northumberland County, is joined by the Taxis River at Boiestown then the larger volume flows northeast. The river is tidal below Renous-Quarryville. The Southwest Miramichi River joins the Northwest Miramichi River at Newcastle to form the Miramichi River.

The river is noted for Atlantic Salmon fishing. It is navigable by canoe throughout much of its length. Nearly every bend in the river, for example Push and Be Damned Rapids, has a distinctive name reflecting the importance of the river to fishermen, canoeists, and lumbermen.

It is sometimes referred to as the "Main Southwest Miramichi River" to distinguish it from the Little Southwest Miramichi River, a smaller, more northerly branch of the Miramichi River system. The Mi'kmaq referred to the river as Lustagoocheech, meaning "good little river" for canoeing.

== Tributaries ==
- North Branch Southwest Miramichi River
- South Branch Southwest Miramichi River
- Taxis River
- Cains River
- Bartholomew River
- Renous River
- Barnaby River

== See also ==
- List of rivers of New Brunswick
