= Types of rural communities =

Rural Sociologists have identified a number of different types of rural communities, which have arisen as a result of changing economic trends within rural regions of industrial nations.

The basic trend seems to be one in which communities are required to become entrepreneurial. Those that lack the sort of characteristics mentioned below, are forced to either seek out their niche or accept eventual economic defeat. These towns focus on marketing and public relations whilst bidding for business and government operations, such as factories or off-site data processing.

For instance, International Falls, Minnesota markets itself as a site for sub-zero temperature experiments, Ottawa, Illinois has attracted three Japanese firms, Freeport, Maine has become a center for mail-order companies such as L. L. Bean, and Mobile, Arizona has become the home of a number of solid-waste landfills.

== Academic communities ==
The primary employers in an academic community are boarding schools, colleges, universities, research laboratories, or corporate training facilities. These academic institutions attract people from other regions, bringing new capital into the area.

Academic institutions in rural areas are very much like factories in that the economic success of the community depends upon the success of the institution. However, academic institutions primarily offer medium-skilled or professional jobs, while factories tend toward low-skilled work.

Examples: Ames, Iowa; Bath, Maine; Plainfield, Vermont.

== Area Trade-Centers ==
The automobile allows rural residents to travel farther, in less time, for goods and services. This, along with decreasing rural population, reduces the importance of the rural store. As businesses relocate from other communities, one town will become the trade center for its region, sometimes constructing a shopping mall.

Generally, businesses in a trade-center town, except for those in competition with the mall, will benefit from the mall's presence as shoppers spill over. However, business in nearby towns will suffer as shoppers converge on the town with the greatest variety of stores.

Examples: West Burlington, Iowa; Wickenburg, Arizona.

== Exurbs ==
See: Commuter town, Exurb

== Government centers ==
Government in rural regions is becoming increasingly consolidated, so that a small number of towns are centers of government activity, while the rest are devoid of government infrastructure. These centers include state and local capitals, and areas with prisons or military bases.

Centralized public administration focuses public-sector employment on a single community, assisting it over its neighbors. Benefits for the government center include improved public services, increased efficiency, and economic savings.

Examples: Lorton, Virginia; Quantico, Virginia.

== Recreation communities ==
Recreation communities ("tourist towns") define some local feature, usually a historic site or scenic vista, as a "natural resource" and market this to tourists. Travelers will then spend money on food, hotels, and the like, which brings capital into the town.

Examples: Deadwood, South Dakota; Harper's Ferry, West Virginia; Tombstone, Arizona; St. Charles, Missouri; Pleasant Hill, Kentucky; Intercourse, Pennsylvania.

== Retirement communities ==
Retirement communities tend to house large numbers of elderly people who have left the workforce. These retirees bring pensions, Social Security, and savings which infuse the area with capital. Many rural hospitals do not have enough patients to support their operational budgets, but those near retirement communities can make up for this by focusing on gerontology.

Retirement communities often have income inequality between local residents and those who have migrated from cities.

Examples: Green Valley, Arizona; Heritage Village, Connecticut.

See also: demographic history of the United States, rural sociology, sociology

== See also ==
- Village
