= Gagetown-Petitcodiac =

Provincial electoral district in New Brunswick, Canada

New Brunswick electoral district
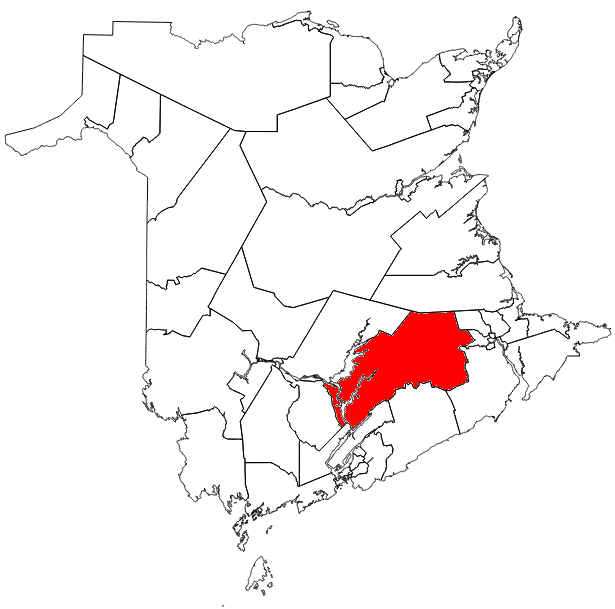
- The riding of Gagetown-Petitcodiac in relation to other New Brunswick electoral districts.
- Coordinates: 45.929°N 65.654°W

Defunct provincial electoral district
- Legislature: Legislative Assembly of New Brunswick
- District created: 2013
- District abolished: 2023
- First contested: 2014
- Last contested: 2020

Demographics
- Population (2011): 15,948
- Electors (2013): 11,131
- Census division(s): Albert, Westmorland, Kings, Queens, Sunbury
- Census subdivision(s): Brunswick, Burton, Cambridge, Cardwell, Coverdale, Elgin, Gagetown (parish), Arcadia, Hampstead, Havelock, Johnston, Kars, Moncton (parish), Three Rivers, Salisbury (parish), Springfield, Studholm, Waterborough

Gagetown-Petitcodiac was a provincial electoral district for the Legislative Assembly of New Brunswick, Canada. It was first contested in the 2014 general election, having been created in the 2013 redistribution of electoral boundaries.

The district ran from the boundaries of the town of Oromocto to those of the city of Moncton along New Brunswick Highway 2, and includes only small municipalities and unincorporated communities. It drew significant population the former districts of Petitcodiac, Grand Lake-Gagetown, Oromocto, Kings East and Hampton-Kings.

== Members of the Legislative Assembly ==
Assembly	Years	Member	Party
Riding created from Petitcodiac, Grand Lake-Gagetown, Oromocto, Kings East and Hampton-Kings
58th	2014–2018	Ross Wetmore	Progressive Conservative
59th	2018–2020	Ross Wetmore	Progressive Conservative
60th	2020–2024	Ross Wetmore	Progressive Conservative
Riding dissolved into Arcadia-Butternut Valley-Maple Hills, Fredericton-Grand Lake, Sussex-Three Rivers, Oromocto-Sunbury and Albert-Riverview

== Election results ==
2020 New Brunswick general election
Party	Candidate	Votes	%	±%
Progressive Conservative	Ross Wetmore	4,773	59.09	+13.38
People's Alliance	Craig Dykeman	1,303	16.13	-7.41
Green	Marilyn Merritt-Gray	1,003	12.42	-1.23
Liberal	Jake Urquhart	867	10.73	-3.61
New Democratic	Ryan Jewkes	131	1.62	-0.43
Total valid votes		8,077		
Total rejected ballots		17	0.21	+0.15
Turnout		8,094	69.03	+1.16
Eligible voters		11,725		
Progressive Conservative hold		Swing		+10.39

2018 New Brunswick general election
Party	Candidate	Votes	%	±%
Progressive Conservative	Ross Wetmore	3,674	45.71	+1.24
People's Alliance	Craig Dykeman	1,892	23.54	--
Liberal	Brigitte Noel	1,153	14.35	-18.80
Green	Marilyn Merritt-Gray	1,097	13.64	+4.23
New Democratic	Anne Marie F. Richardson	165	2.05	-10.92
KISS	Carolyn MacDonald	56	0.70	--
Total valid votes		8,037	100.0	
Total rejected ballots		5	0.06	
Turnout		8,042	67.88	
Eligible voters		11,848		

2014 New Brunswick general election
Party	Candidate	Votes	%
Progressive Conservative	Ross Wetmore	3,352	44.47
Liberal	Barak Stevens	2,499	33.15
New Democratic	Anthony Crandall	978	12.97
Green	Fred Harrison	709	9.41
Total valid votes		7,538	100.0
Total rejected ballots		34	0.45
Turnout		7,572	63.74
Eligible voters		11,879	
This riding was created from parts of Petitcodiac, Grand Lake-Gagetown, Oromocto, Kings East and Hampton-Kings, all of which elected Progressive Conservatives in the previous election. Ross Wetmore was the incumbent from Grand Lake-Gagetown.
Source: Elections New Brunswick
