= Johnston Parish, New Brunswick =

Johnston
- Parish
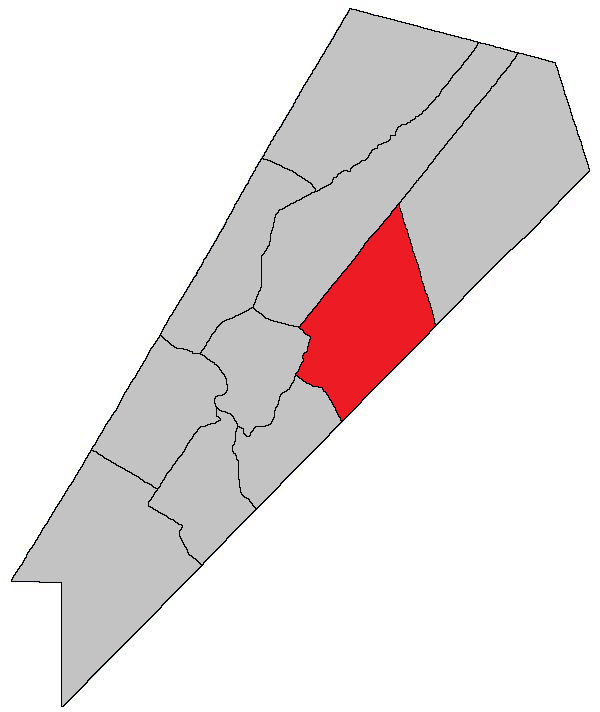
- Location within Queens County, New Brunswick.
- Coordinates: 45.84°N 64.59°W
- Country: Canada
- Province: New Brunswick
- County: Queens County
- Erected: 1839

Area
  - Land: 360.87 km^{2} (139.33 sq mi)

Population (2021)
  - Total: 638
  - Density: 1.8/km^{2} (4.7/sq mi)
  - Change 2016-2021: ▲13.9%
  - Dwellings: 384
- Time zone: UTC-4 (AST)
  - Summer (DST): UTC-3 (ADT)
- Figures do not include portion within the village of Cambridge-Narrows

Johnston Parish is a geographic parish in Queens County, New Brunswick, Canada.

Prior to the 2023 governance reform, for governance purposes it was divided between the village of Cambridge-Narrows and the local service district of the parish of Johnston, both of which were members of Kings Regional Service Commission (RSC8).

== Origin of name ==
The parish was named in honour of Hugh Johnston Jr., MLA for Queens County and member of the Executive Council at the time. Johnston's father Hugh preceded him as MLA from Saint John County and died there in 1829.

== History ==
Johnston was erected in 1839 from Wickham Parish.

In 1852 part of Johnston was included in the newly erected Cambridge Parish.

In 1856 the boundary with Cambridge Parish was altered.

== Boundaries ==
Johnston Parish is bounded:

- on the east by a line running north-northwesterly from north of the end of Chittick Road in Marrtown, crossing the Canaan River east of Phillips Brook and striking the Waterborough Parish line about 2 kilometres northwest of Parks Lake;
- on the southeast by the Kings County line;
- on the west by a line running north from the Kings County line along Route 695 and Watson Road to Washademoak Lake, then upstream through the middle of the lake to a point about three hundred metres southwest of Fowlers Cove, then northeasterly to Route 715, then northwesterly along the highway and Fowler Road to the Waterborough Parish line about 1.5 kilometres past the junction of Fowler Road with Route 715;
- on the northwest by a line running north 54º east (Note: By the magnet of 1786, when declination at the starting point was a bit more than 14º west of north.) from a point on the Saint John River about 1.8 kilometres southwest of the Route 715 bridge over McAlpines Brook.

== Communities ==
Communities at least partly within the parish.

- Annidale
- Bagdad
- Cambridge-Narrows
  - Hammtown
- Canaan Rapids
- Chambres Corner
- Codys
- Coles Island
- Goshen
- Highfield
- Long Creek
- Partridge Valley
- Phillipstown
- Salmon Creek
- Smith Corner
- Thornetown
- Washademoak
- Waterloo Corner
- Youngs Cove Road

== Bodies of water ==
Bodies of water (Note: Not including brooks, ponds or coves.) at least partly within the parish.

- Canaan River
- Long Creek
- Salmon Creek
- Washademoak Lake

== Islands ==
Islands at least partly within the parish.

- Coles Island

== Other notable places ==
Parks, historic sites, and other noteworthy places at least partly within the parish.

- Partridge Valley East Protected Natural Area
- Phillipstown Protected Natural Area

== Demographics ==
Parish population total does not include portion within Cambridge-Narrows

=== Population ===
Population trend

Census	Population	Change (%)
2016	560	▼15.2%
2011	660	▼3.5%
2006	684	▼0.4%
2001	687	

=== Language ===
Mother tongue (2016)

Language	Population	Pct (%)
English only	545	97.3%
French only	10	1.8%
Both English and French	0	0%
Other languages	5	0.9%

== Access Routes ==
Highways and numbered routes that run through the parish, including external routes that start or finish at the parish limits:

- Highways
  - none
- Principal Routes
  - Route 2 (TCH)
  - Route 10
- Secondary Routes:
  - Route 112
  - Route 695
  - Route 710
  - Route 715
- External Routes:
  - None

== See also ==
- List of parishes in New Brunswick
