= Cambridge Parish, New Brunswick =

Cambridge
- Parish
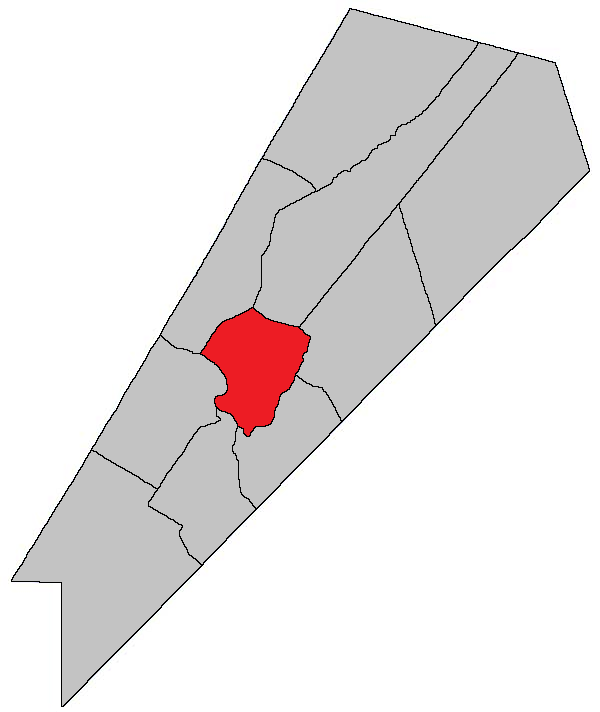
- Location within Queens County, New Brunswick.
- Coordinates: 45.84°N 64.59°W
- Country: Canada
- Province: New Brunswick
- County: Queens County
- Erected: 1852

Area
  - Land: 113.17 km^{2} (43.70 sq mi)

Population (2021)
  - Total: 684
  - Density: 6/km^{2} (16/sq mi)
  - Change 2016-2021: ▲5.7%
  - Dwellings: 478
- Time zone: UTC-4 (AST)
  - Summer (DST): UTC-3 (ADT)
- Figures do not include portion within the village of Cambridge-Narrows

Cambridge is a geographic parish in Queens County, New Brunswick, Canada.

Prior to the 2023 governance reform, for governance purposes it was divided between the village of Cambridge-Narrows and the local service district of the parish of Cambridge, both of which were members of Capital Region Service Commission (RSC11).

== Origin of name ==
The parish was "said to" have been named in honour of the Duke of Cambridge, who died in 1850.

== History ==
Cambridge was erected in 1852 from Johnston, Waterborough, and Wickham Parishes.

In 1856 the boundary with Johnston and Waterborough Parishes was altered.

== Boundaries ==
Cambridge Parish is bounded:

- on the east by a line beginning at Mill Cove on Grand Lake, then running along Fowler Road, Route 715, and the public landing southwest of Fowlers Cove to Washademoak Lake;
- on the southeast by Washademoak Lake;
- on the west by Colwells Creek and the Saint John River;
- on the northwest by a line beginning on the Saint John River about 75 metres downstream of the Route 2 interchange with Route 105 and Conservation Road, then running north-northeasterly across the isthmus to Grand Lake, then up Grand Lake to Mill Cove;
- including most of Thatch Island, which is now a peninsula.

== Communities ==
Communities at least partly within the parish; bold indicates an incorporated municipality

- Cherry Hill
- Jemseg
- Lower Cambridge
- Lower Jemseg
- Mill Cove
- Scovil
- Whites Cove
- **Cambridge-Narrows**
  - Central Cambridge
  - Lakeview
  - McDonald Corner

== Bodies of water ==
Bodies of water (Note: Not including brooks, ponds or coves.) at least partly in the parish:

- Jemseg River
- Saint John River
- Colwells Creek
- Trout Creek
- Lawson Passage
- Raft Channel
- Dykeman Lake
- Foshay Lake
- Grand Lake
- Little Lake
- Washademoak Lake

== Islands ==
Islands in the parish:

- Coreys Island
- Huestis Island
- Nevers Island
- Thatch Island

== Demographics ==
Parish population total does not include portion within former incorporated village of Cambridge-Narrows. Revised census figures based on the 2023 local governance reforms have not been released.

=== Population ===
Population trend

Census	Population	Change (%)
2021	684	▲5.7%
2016	647	▼0.6%
2011	651	▼4.5%
2006	682	▲6.7%
2001	639	

=== Language ===
Mother tongue (2021)

Language	Population	Pct (%)
English only	580	95.1%
French only	10	1.6%
Both English and French	5	0.8%
Other languages	15	2.5%

== Access Routes ==
Highways and numbered routes that run through the parish, including external routes that start or finish at the parish limits:

- **Highways**
  - Route 2 (TCH)
- **Principal Routes**
  - Route 105
- Secondary Routes:
  - Route 695
  - Route 715
- External Routes:
  - None

== See also ==
- List of parishes in New Brunswick
