= List of historic places in Queens County, New Brunswick =

This is a list of historic places in Queens County, New Brunswick entered on the Canadian Register of Historic Places, whether they are federal, provincial, or municipal.

== List of historic places ==
Name	Address	Coordinates	Government recognition (CRHP №)	Wikidata ID	Image
Barrack Block	Dufferin Drive; Arcadia NB	45°50′16″N 66°26′12″W	Federal (15391)		Upload Photo
Barrack Block	Dufferin Drive; Arcadia NB	45°50′16″N 66°26′13″W	Federal (15364)		Upload Photo
Drill Hall D15	CFB Gagetown; Arcadia NB		Federal (10894)		Upload Photo
Drill Hall H12	St. Jean Avenue, CFB Gagetown; Arcadia NB	45°50′42″N 66°27′21″W	Federal (10892)		Upload Photo
Nehemiah Belyea House	3259 Lower Cambridge Road; Arcadia NB	45°45′20″N 66°00′53″W	Arcadia municipality (15651)		Upload Photo
Cambridge-Narrows Municipal Building	6 Municipal Lane; Arcadia NB	45°49′39″N 65°57′22″W	Arcadia municipality (15646)		Upload Photo
Cambridge-Narrows Regional Library	2216 Lakeview Road; Arcadia NB	45°49′55″N 65°57′16″W	Arcadia municipality (15645)		
Chipman Community Heritage Centre	238 Main Street; Chipman NB	46°10′33″N 65°52′51″W	Chipman municipality (12222)		Upload Photo
Claremont	104 Tilley Road; Arcadia NB	45°47′19″N 66°08′47″W	Arcadia municipality (15603)		Upload Photo
Codys Women's Institute Hall	1 Codys Lane; Johnston NB	45°52′29″N 65°49′36″W	New Brunswick (7734)		Upload Photo
Archdeacon Hiram A. Cody House	37 Codys Lane; Codys NB	45°52′14″N 65°49′48″W	New Brunswick (9991)		Upload Photo
Cossar Farm Site	16 Fox Road; Arcadia NB	45°44′26″N 66°08′06″W	Arcadia municipality (15943)		Upload Photo
Cow Point Site	Scotchtown Road; Scotchtown NB	45°52′46″N 66°10′02″W	New Brunswick (13155)		
Darrah's Insurance Ltd. Building	267 Main Street; Chipman NB	46°10′29″N 65°52′56″W	Chipman municipality (12241)		Upload Photo
Anthony Flower House	Lower Cambridge Road; Arcadia NB	45°49′41″N 65°57′26″W	Arcadia municipality (15643)		Upload Photo
Glenora	7 Peters Street; Arcadia NB	45°47′00″N 66°08′44″W	Arcadia municipality (15944)		Upload Photo
Hector House	20 Front Street; Arcadia NB	45°46′48″N 66°08′37″W	Arcadia municipality (15946)		Upload Photo
Hendry Farm Lighthouse	Washademoak Lane; Arcadia NB	45°43′58″N 66°02′54″W	Arcadia municipality (15497)		Upload Photo
History of Coal Mining Monument	187 Main Street (adjacent); Minto NB	46°04′32″N 66°04′24″W	Minto municipality (12242)		Upload Photo
Jemseg Archaeological Site	Highway 695; Arcadia NB	45°49′44″N 66°06′59″W	New Brunswick (7990)		Upload Photo
Junior Ranks Quarters	Cartier Crescent; Arcadia NB	45°50′16″N 66°26′12″W	Federal (15386)		Upload Photo
Dr. Malcolm MacDonald House	2224 Lakeview Road; Arcadia NB	45°49′53″N 65°57′18″W	Arcadia municipality (15649)		Upload Photo
Orange Hall Museum	Court House Road; Arcadia NB	45°47′09″N 66°08′42″W	Arcadia municipality (15948)		Upload Photo
Harry Peters House	5 Mill Road; Arcadia NB	45°46′52″N 66°08′42″W	Arcadia municipality (15945)		Upload Photo
James Peters Tombstone	Front Street; Arcadia NB	45°47′07″N 66°08′41″W	Arcadia municipality (15947)		Upload Photo
Pines Conservation Park	1307 Bridge Drive; Arcadia NB	45°49′47″N 65°56′54″W	Arcadia municipality (15647)		Upload Photo
Queens County Court House	16 Court House Road; Arcadia NB	45°47′08″N 66°08′53″W	New Brunswick (5978), Arcadia municipality (15949)		Upload Photo
Reid's Mill Smokestack	32 and 34 Old Mill Road; Arcadia NB	45°45′44″N 66°08′25″W	Arcadia municipality (15952)		Upload Photo
Charles Robinson House	2321 Lower Cambridge Road; Arcadia NB	45°49′23″N 65°57′10″W	Arcadia municipality (15648)		Upload Photo
James S. Robinson House	2349 Lower Cambridge Road; Arcadia NB	45°49′16″N 65°57′27″W	Arcadia municipality (15650)		Upload Photo
St. John's Anglican Church Cemetery	Front Street; Arcadia NB	45°47′07″N 66°08′40″W	Arcadia municipality (15951)		Upload Photo
Soldiers' Memorial Hall	81 Tilley Road; Arcadia NB	45°47′09″N 66°08′49″W	Arcadia municipality (15953)		Upload Photo
Sir Samuel Leonard Tilley House / Tilley House National Historic Site of Canada	69 Front Street; Arcadia NB	45°47′04″N 66°08′41″W	Federal (12662), New Brunswick (1247), Arcadia municipality (15950)		Upload Photo
Wharves of Cambridge-Narrows	Washademoak Lake, western shore Arcadia NB	45°47′05″N 65°59′13″W	Arcadia municipality (15644)		Upload Photo
Wolastoq National Historic Site of Canada	Entire watershed of Saint John River central and western New Brunswick, parts of southeastern Quebec NB	45°45′37″N 66°08′11″W	Federal (18954)		More images
Yeamans House	4 Yeamans Road; Minto NB	46°04′37″N 66°03′00″W	Minto municipality (12243)		More images

== See also ==
- List of historic places in New Brunswick
- List of National Historic Sites of Canada in New Brunswick
