= Gaspereau River (Salmon River tributary) =

Coordinates: 46°14′0″N 65°51′0″W

Location
- Country: Canada
- Province: New Brunswick

Physical characteristics
- Source
  - location: Gaspereau Lake
- Mouth
  - location: Salmon River

The Gaspereau River is a small river in central New Brunswick, Canada. It flows from Gaspereau Lake into the Salmon River near Gaspereau Forks, which flows into Grand Lake. It is part of the Saint John River watershed.

== See also ==
- List of rivers of New Brunswick
