= Queens County, New Brunswick =

County in New Brunswick, Canada

Coordinates: 45°50′N 66°00′W

Queens
- County
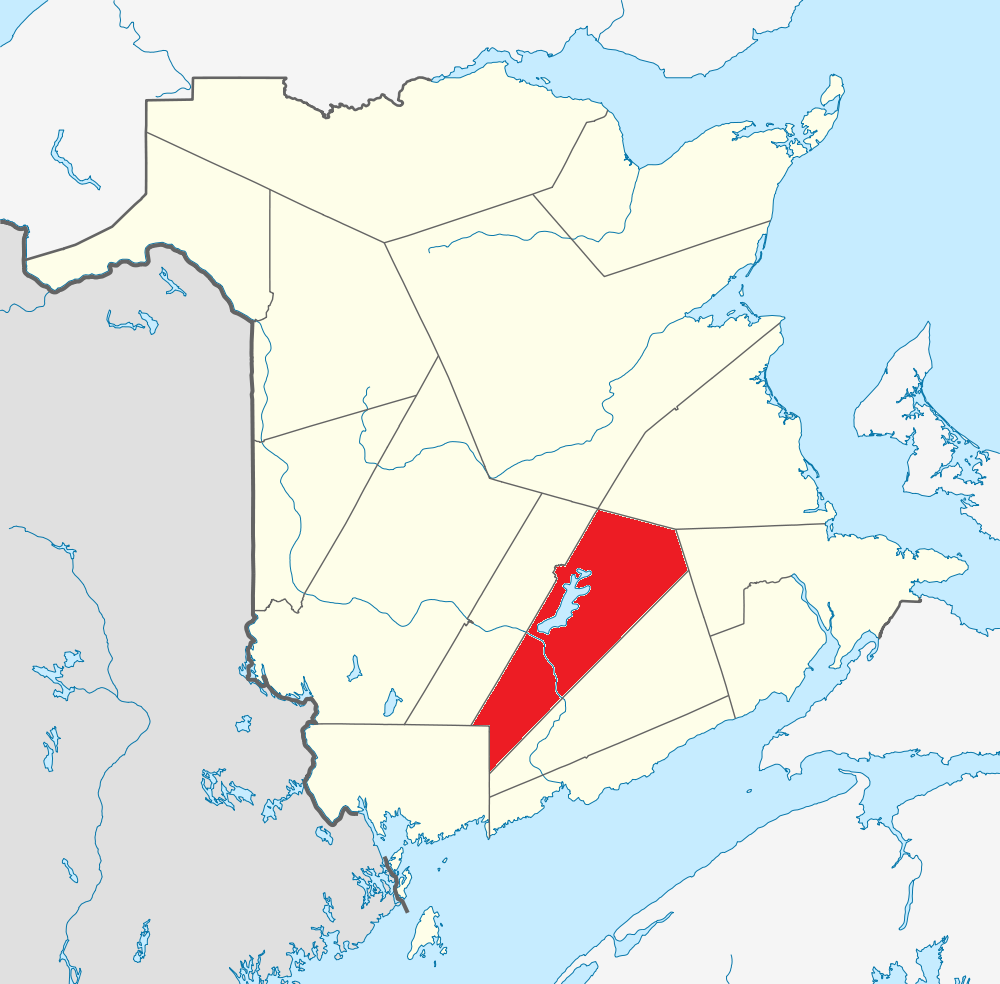
- Location within New Brunswick.
- Country: Canada
- Province: New Brunswick
- Established: 1785
- Shire town: Gagetown

Area
  - Land: 3,681.05 km^{2} (1,421.26 sq mi)

Population (2021)
  - Total: 10,998
  - Density: 3/km^{2} (7.8/sq mi)
  - Change 2016–2021: ▲5.0%
  - Dwellings: 6,854
- Time zone: UTC−4 (AST)
  - Summer (DST): UTC−3 (ADT)
- Area code: 506

Queens County (French: Comté de Queens; 2021 population 10,998) is located in south central New Brunswick, Canada. The county shire town is the village of Gagetown. The county was named as an expression of loyalty to the Crown and to commemorate a group of earlier settlers originally from Queens County, New York.

== Geography ==
The county's geography is dominated by the Saint John River and Grand Lake. Coal mining is a major industry in the Minto area. Forestry and mixed farming dominate the rest of the county. The CFB Gagetown military training area takes in a large portion of the western part of the county.

== Census subdivisions ==
=== Communities ===
There are four municipalities within Queens County (listed by 2021 population):

Official name	Designation	Area km^{2}	Population	Parish
Minto	Village	31.36	2,234	Canning
Chipman	Village	19.00	1,201	Chipman
Gagetown	Village	49.32	787	Gagetown
Cambridge-Narrows	Village	106.79	715	Cambridge

- Part of Minto lies within Sunbury County, but since most of it is in Queens County, Statistics Canada considers it as part of Queens.

=== Parishes ===
The county is subdivided into ten parishes (listed by 2021 population):

Official name	Area km^{2}	Population	Municipalities	Unincorporated communities
Canning	173.25	1,028	Minto (village)	Back Road / Canning / Clarks Corners / Douglas Harbour / Flowers Cove / Lake Road / Maquapit Lake / Newcastle Center / Newcastle Centre / Newcastle Creek / Princess Park / Scotchtown / Sunnyside Beach / Sypher Cove / Upper Gagetown / Wuhr's Beach Road
Chipman	483.45	853	Chipman (village)	Briggs Corner / Bronson / Bronson Settlement / Camp Wegesegum / Castaway / Coal Creek / Dufferin / Fowlers Corner / Gaspereau Forks / Harley Road / Iron Bound Cove / Kings Mines / Leckey Road / Midland / Redbank / Salmon Creek / Salmon River / The Ridge / Upper Gaspereau
Waterborough	443.16	903		Cox Point / Cumberland Bay / Cumberland Point / Grant Settlement / Mill Cove / New Dominion Road / Pangburn / Rees / The Range / Union Settlement / Waterborough / Youngs Cove
Petersville	589.95	710		Bayard / Blagdon / Clarendon / Enniskillen / Fowlers Corners / Petersville / Welsford / Wirral / Wirral Station / Wirral-Enniskillen
Cambridge	113.17	684	Cambridge-Narrows	Cherry Hill / Jemseg / Lower Cambridge / Lower Jemseg / Robertson Point / Scovil / Whites Cove
Johnston	360.87	638		Annidale / Bagdad / Canaan Rapids / Chambres Corner / Codys / Coles Island / Highfield / Johnston / Long Creek / Partridge Valley / Phillipstown / Salmon Creek / Smith Corner / Thornetown / Washademoak / Waterloo Corner / Youngs Cove Road
Wickham	160.54	409		Bald Hill / Belyeas Cove / Big Cove / Carpenter / Crafts Cove / Henderson Settlement / London Settlement / MacDonalds Point / Shannon / Wickham
Gagetown	234.58	324	Gagetown (village)	Coytown / Mill Road / Upper Gagetown
Hampstead	212.39	288		Central Hampstead / Elm Hill / Hampstead / McAlpines / Pleasant Villa / Quarries / Queenstown
Brunswick	703.20	224		Alward / Brookvale / Brunswick / Canaan Forks / Cherryvale / Forks Stream / Hunters Home / New Canaan

== Demographics ==
Historical Census Data - Queens County, New Brunswick
Year	Pop.	±%
1991	12,519	—
1996	12,470	−0.4%
2001	11,862	−4.9%
2006	11,708	−1.3%
2011	11,086	−5.3%
2016	10,472	−5.5%
2021	10,998	+5.0%

As a census division in the 2021 Census of Population conducted by Statistics Canada, Queens County had a population of 10,998 living in 5,133 of its 6,854 total private dwellings, a change of 5% from its 2016 population of 10,472. With a land area of 3,681.05 km^{2} (1,421.26 sq mi), it had a population density of 3.0/km^{2} (7.7/sq mi) in 2021.

Canada census – Queens community profile

	2021	2016	2011
Population	10,998 (+5.0% from 2016)	10,472 (−5.5% from 2011)	11,086 (−5.3% from 2006)
Land area	3,681.05 km^{2} (1,421.26 sq mi)	3,686.05 km^{2} (1,423.19 sq mi)	3,681.98 km^{2} (1,421.62 sq mi)
Population density	3/km^{2} (7.8/sq mi)	2.8/km^{2} (7.3/sq mi)	3.0/km^{2} (7.8/sq mi)
Median age	56.4 (M: 56, F: 56.8)	54.4 (M: 54.2, F: 54.6)	51.3 (M: 51.0, F: 51.7)
Private dwellings	5,135 (total)	7,289 (total)	7,337 (total)
Median household income		$48,539	$45,555

References: 2021 2016 2011

=== Language ===
Canada Census Mother Tongue - Queens County, New Brunswick
Census	Total	English			French			English & French			Other		
Year	Responses	Count	Trend	Pop %	Count	Trend	Pop %	Count	Trend	Pop %	Count	Trend	Pop %
2021	10,810	10,170	▲5.3%	94.08%	385	▼13.5%	3.56%	70	▲75.0%	0.65%	170	▲13.3%	1.57%
2016	10,290	9,655	▼5.3%	93.83%	445	▼11.0%	4.32%	40	Steady	0.39%	150	▲15.4%	1.46%
2011	10,865	10,195	▼2.9%	93.83%	500	▼18.0%	4.60%	40	▼27.3%	0.37%	130	▼56.7%	1.20%
2006	11,460	10,495	▼3.4%	91.58%	610	▲17.3%	5.32%	55	▲37.5%	0.48%	300	▲46.3%	2.62%
2001	11,635	10,870	▼4.7%	93.43%	520	▼23.0%	4.47%	40	0.0%	0.34%	205	▲57.7%	1.76%
1996	12,255	11,410	n/a	93.10%	675	n/a	5.51%	40	n/a	0.37%	130	n/a	1.01%

== Transportation ==
=== Major highways ===
- Route 2 (TCH)
- Route 7
- Route 10
- Route 101
- Route 102
- Route 105
- Route 112
- Route 116
- Route 123
- Route 690
- Route 695
- Route 705
- Route 710
- Route 715

== See also ==
- List of communities in New Brunswick
- Queens, New York
- Royal eponyms in Canada
