= New Brunswick Route 123 =

Highway in New Brunswick, Canada

Route 123

Route information
- Maintained by New Brunswick Department of Transportation
- Length: 51.98 km (32.30 mi)
- Existed: 1976.–present

Major junctions
- South end: Route 10 in Chipman
- North end: Route 8 in Doaktown

Location
- Country: Canada
- Province: New Brunswick
- Major cities: Chipman, Doaktown

Highway system
- Provincial highways in New Brunswick; Former routes
← Route 122	→ Route 124

Route 123 is a mostly North/South provincial highway in the Canadian province of New Brunswick. The road runs from Route 10 in Chipman. The road has a length of approximately 52 kilometres, and services small, otherwise isolated rural communities. In these areas, the highway is often unofficially referred to as "Main Street." The Highway is known as Main Street and McLeod Avenue in Chipman. The road is then known as Grand Lake Road from Gaspereau Forks to Doaktown. Lastly upon entering Doaktown, the road is named South Road.

== Intersecting routes ==
- Begins at a sharp corner of Route 10 in Chipman as known as Main Street
- Crosses to Route 116 in Gaspereau Forks
- Ending in Doaktown

== River crossings ==
- Hutchinson Brook in Chipman
- Salmon River in Gaspereau Forks
- Gaspereau River
- Cains River

== Communities along the Route ==
- Chipman
- Gaspereau Forks
- Upper Gaspereau
- Grand Lake Road
- Doaktown

== See also ==
- List of New Brunswick provincial highways
