= Cambridge-Narrows =

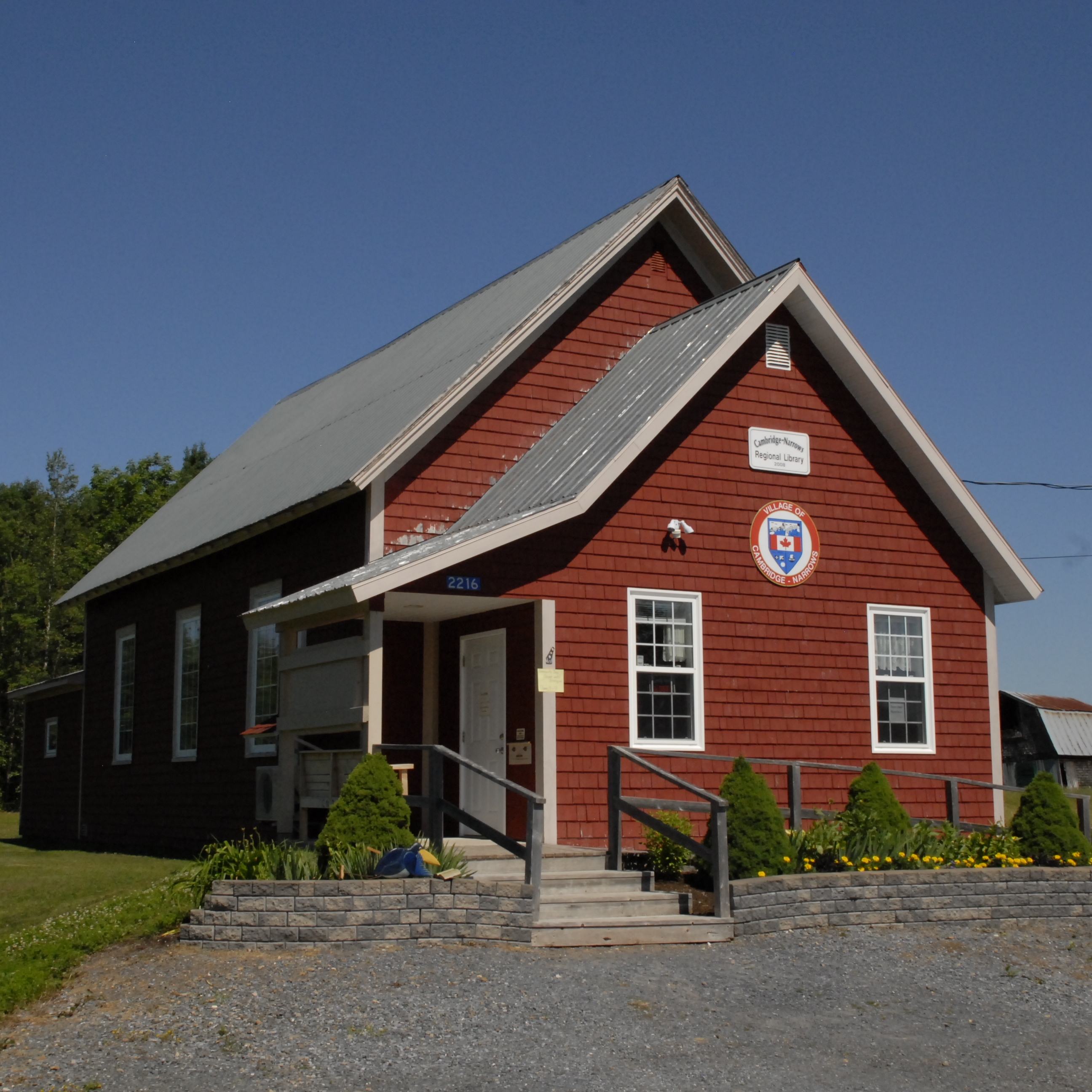
- Cambridge-Narrows Regional Library

- Location within New Brunswick
- Coordinates: 45°49′42″N 65°57′20″W
- Country: Canada
- Province: New Brunswick
- County: Queens
- Parish: Cambridge
- Municipality: Arcadia
- Incorporated: 1966

Area
  - Land: 106.79 km^{2} (41.23 sq mi)

Population (2021)
  - Total: 715
  - Density: 6.7/km^{2} (17/sq mi)
  - Change 2016–21: ▲27.2%
- Time zone: UTC-4 (EST)
  - Summer (DST): UTC-3 (EDT)
- Website: www.cambridge-narrows.ca

Cambridge-Narrows is a former village in Queens County, New Brunswick, Canada. It held village status prior to 2023 and is now part of the village of Arcadia.

The village straddled Washedemoak Lake, a widening of the Canaan River, several kilometres upstream of the Saint John River. Cambridge-Narrows has 3 main arteries, Route 695, Route 715, and Route 710

== History ==
The Cambridge-Narrows consisted of two separate settlements on either side of the river, Cambridge and The Narrows, which were merged under one municipal government in 1966.

On 1 January 2023, Cambridge-Narrows amalgamated with the village of Gagetown and all or part of five local service districts to form the new village of Arcadia. The community's name remains in official use.

== Demographics ==
In the 2021 Census of Population conducted by Statistics Canada, Cambridge-Narrows had a population of 715 living in 345 of its 629 total private dwellings, a change of 27.2% from its 2016 population of 562. With a land area of 106.79 km^{2} (41.23 sq mi), it had a population density of 6.7/km^{2} (17.3/sq mi) in 2021.

== Bordering communities ==
- Hampton
- Big Cove
- McDonald Corner
- Jemseg
- Hatfield Point
- Springfield, Kings County
