= New Brunswick Route 695 =

Highway in New Brunswick, Canada

Route 695

Route information
- Maintained by New Brunswick Department of Transportation
- Length: 35.2 km (21.9 mi)

Major junctions
- South end: Route 124 in Springfield
- Route 2 (TCH) in Jemseg
- North end: Route 105 in Jemseg

Location
- Country: Canada
- Province: New Brunswick

Highway system
- Provincial highways in New Brunswick; Former routes
← Route 690	→ Route 705

Route 695 is a local highway located in south central New Brunswick. It begins in the south at Route 124 in Springfield and runs for 35.2 kilometres (21.9 mi), through Arcadia, to its northern terminus in Jemseg at Route 105.

== Major junctions ==
County	Location	km	mi	Destinations	Notes
Kings	Springfield Parish	0.0	0.0	Route 124 – Evandale, Valley Waters	
Queens	Arcadia	20.2	12.6	Route 710 south (Waterside Drive) – Hatfield Point	Southern end of concurrency with Route 710
Queens	Arcadia	20.6	12.8	Route 710 north (Scenic Narrows Boulevard) – Sussex	Northern end of concurrency with Route 710
Queens	Arcadia	22.0	13.7	Route 715 (Lower Cambridge Road / Lakeview Road) – Lower Cambridge, Coles Island	
Queens	Jemseg	34.3	21.3	Route 715 east – Lower Jemseg	Western terminus of Route 715
Queens	Jemseg	34.5– 34.9	21.4– 21.7	Route 2 (TCH) – Fredericton, Moncton	Exit 339 on Route 2
Queens	Jemseg	35.2	21.9	Route 105 north – Youngs Cove	Southern terminus of Route 105 (southern segment); traffic must use Route 2 (TCH) west to access Route 105 south of Jemseg due to the permanent closure of the old Jemseg River Bridge.
1.000 mi = 1.609 km; 1.000 km = 0.621 mi

== See also ==
- List of New Brunswick provincial highways
