= New Brunswick Route 690 =

Highway in New Brunswick, Canada

Coordinates: 45.965709°N 66.071091°W

Route 690

Route information
- Maintained by New Brunswick Department of Transportation
- Length: 46 km (29 mi)

Major junctions
- North end: Route 10 in Minto
- South end: Route 105 in McGowans Corner

Location
- Country: Canada
- Province: New Brunswick

Highway system
- Provincial highways in New Brunswick; Former routes
| ← Route 670 | → Route 695 |

Route 690 is a 45.6-kilometre (28.3 mi) long mostly north–south secondary highway in the southwestern portion of New Brunswick, Canada. Most of the route is in Canning Parish.

The route starts at Route 10 between Minto and Newcastle Bridge, where it travels southeast through a mostly forested area to Newcastle Creek on the east bank of Grand Lake. From here, the road travels southwest past Evans Road and Flowers Cove where it turns south through Sypher Cove. The road then passes The Keyhole while continuing through Princess Park. It then travels to Douglas Harbour before turning northeast to Clarks Corners. The road again turns southwest, and it passes Hunters Ferry Cove, Hunters Island and Maquapit Lake before intersecting with Route 670 in Lakeville Corner. From here, the road travels southwest through Fulton Island, past Harrison Island, to end at McGowans Corner at Route 105 on the Saint John River.
