= Judson Hetherington =

Canadian politician

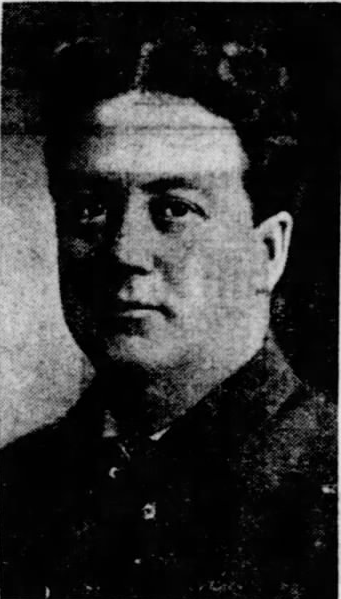

Judson Egbert Hetherington (May 15, 1866 – January 29, 1928) was a physician and political figure in New Brunswick, Canada. He represented Queen's County in the Legislative Assembly of New Brunswick from 1917 to 1925 as a Liberal.

He was born in Codys, New Brunswick, the son of Thomas Hetherington and Violet D. Thorne. He studied medicine at the Chicago Homeopathic Medical College and Rush Medical College. In 1894, he married Anna H. Lancey. In 1906, he retired from medicine and returned to New Brunswick. Hetherington was a prominent freemason. He served as Speaker of the Legislative Assembly of New Brunswick from 1919 to 1920 and as Provincial Secretary-Treasurer (Minister of Finance) from 1921 to 1925, when he was defeated.

His widow established the Judson E. Hetherington Memorial Library at Saint John Hospital and scholarships for New Brunswick medical students at Acadia University under the Hetherington name.

Political offices
Preceded by William Currie	Speaker of the Legislative Assembly of New Brunswick; 1919–1920	Succeeded by Allison Dysart
