= Gagetown, New Brunswick =

Gagetown
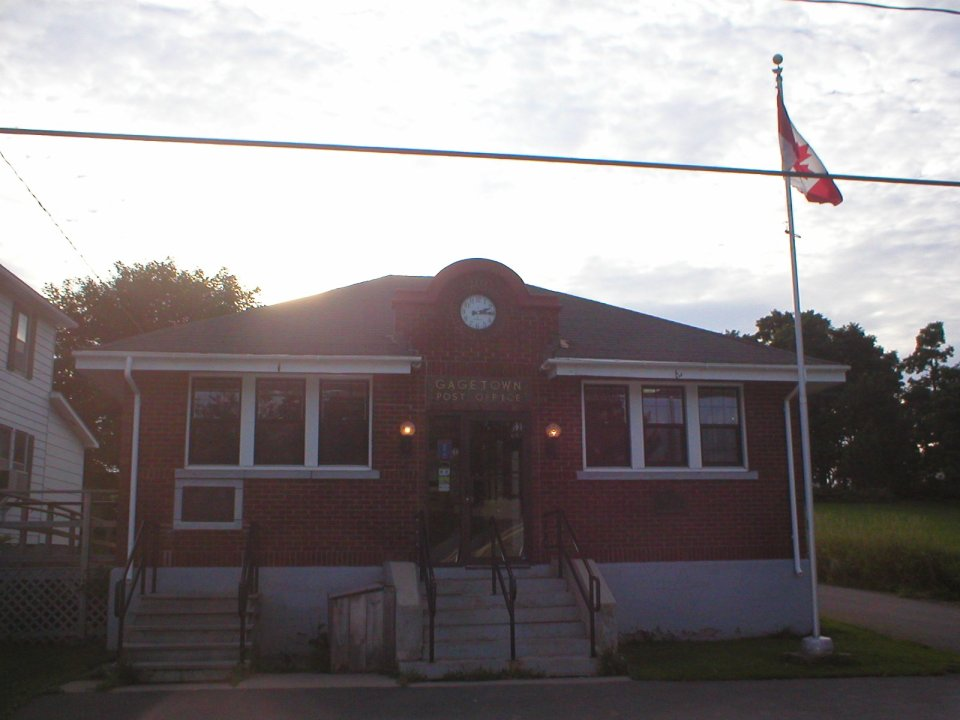
- Gagetown village post office

- Location of Gagetown, New Brunswick
- Coordinates: 45.77°N 66.16°W
- Country: Canada
- Province: New Brunswick
- County: Queens
- Parish: Gagetown
- Municipality: Arcadia
- Village Status: 1966

Area
  - Land: 49.32 km^{2} (19.04 sq mi)

Population (2021)
  - Total: 787
  - Density: 16/km^{2} (41/sq mi)
  - Change (2016–21): ▲10.7%
- Time zone: UTC-4 (AST)
  - Summer (DST): UTC-3 (ADT)
- Area code: 506
- Dwellings: 339
- Median Income*: $62,976 CDN
- Access Routes: Route 102
- Median household income, 2015 (all households)

Gagetown is a former village in Queens County, New Brunswick, Canada. It held village status prior to 2023 and is now part of the village of Arcadia. It is on the west bank of the Saint John River and is the county's shire town.

== History ==
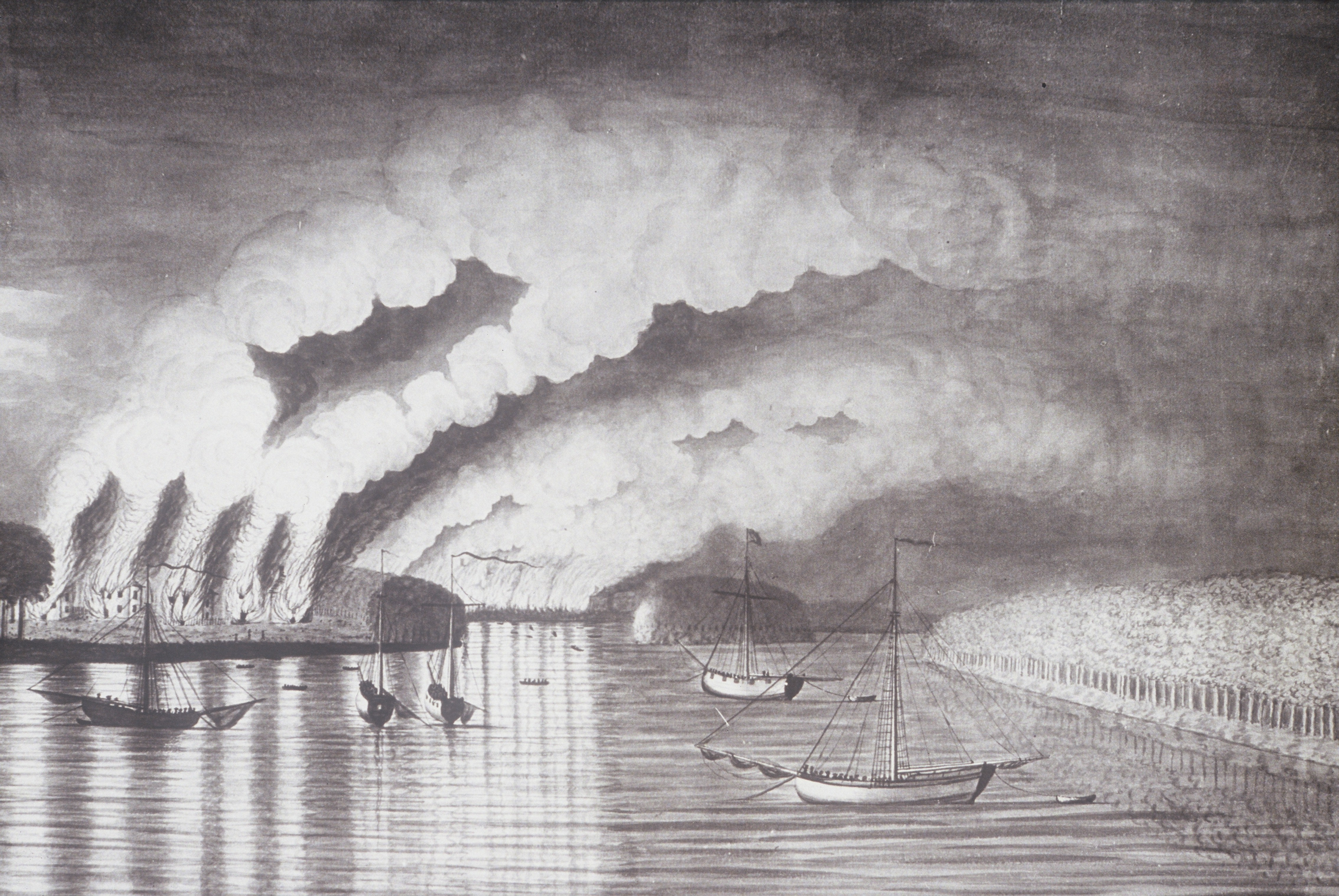
St. John River Campaign: A View of the Plundering and Burning of the City of Grimross (present day Gagetown, New Brunswick) by Thomas Davies in 1758. This is the only contemporaneous image of the Expulsion of the Acadians

Gagetown was originally named Grimross by the Acadians and Maliseet, who lived there prior to the Expulsion of the Acadians. The Raid on Grimross occurred during the St. John River Campaign (1758–59). During the Expulsion of the Acadians, many Acadians fled from various parts of the Maritimes to villages along the Saint John River. The St. John River Campaign occurred during the French and Indian War when Colonel Robert Monckton led a force of 1,150 British soldiers to destroy the Acadian settlements on the banks of the Saint John River until they reached the largest village of Ste Anne's Point (present day Fredericton, New Brunswick) in February 1759. There were 2000 Acadians on the Saint John River, many of whom were refugees trying to escape the Expulsion of the Acadians.

On November 4, 1758, Robert Monckton entered the nearly vacant village and New England Rangers under his command chased down and scalped Acadians. They burned 50 buildings, crops and killed the animals.

The name of the village is derived from British General Thomas Gage. Major General Thomas Gage was granted a large tract of land in central New Brunswick in appreciation of his service to the British Empire in the Seven Years' War; this land comprises modern day Gagetown.

During the 1800s and early 1900s, Gagetown was a historic Loyalist community that served as a stop for river boats. It is the birthplace of Sir Samuel Leonard Tilley, a Father of Confederation.

The nearby army training centre, CFB Gagetown, takes its name from the community, although its headquarters are in Oromocto. Despite sharing the name, Gagetown has no direct access to the base and its training area.

Every Summer since 2009 a local music & art collective known as FEELS GOOD and the North Hampton Brewing Company (which produces a local microbrew known as Picaroons) has produced and hosted a 3-day music festival known as Folly Fest. Folly Fest generally falls on the weekend closest to the split of June & July.

The Gagetown Ferry, formerly a free cable ferry, crossed the Saint John River to Lower Jemseg on the east bank, but in 2015 the Liberal Government cut the ferry for provincial budget reasons. In 2020, the Gagetown ferry service was restored but only for the summer tourist season.

On 1 January 2023, Gagetown amalgamated with the village of Cambridge-Narrows and all or part of five local service districts to form the new village of Arcadia. The community's name remains in official use.

== Climate ==
Gagetown has a humid continental climate (Köppen Dfb) with warm summers, cold winters and plenty of precipitation year-round. Snowfall is frequent in winter.

Climate data for Gagetown, New Brunswick (1981–2010 normals)
Month	Jan	Feb	Mar	Apr	May	Jun	Jul	Aug	Sep	Oct	Nov	Dec	Year
Record high °C (°F)	14.5 (58.1)	19.5 (67.1)	21.7 (71.1)	28.5 (83.3)	34.5 (94.1)	34.5 (94.1)	36.1 (97.0)	37.2 (99.0)	33.3 (91.9)	28.3 (82.9)	21.1 (70.0)	16.0 (60.8)	37.4 (99.3)
Mean daily maximum °C (°F)	−4.1 (24.6)	−1.9 (28.6)	2.6 (36.7)	9.3 (48.7)	16.6 (61.9)	21.9 (71.4)	24.8 (76.6)	24.4 (75.9)	19.7 (67.5)	13.0 (55.4)	6.0 (42.8)	−0.4 (31.3)	11.0 (51.8)
Daily mean °C (°F)	−8.6 (16.5)	−6.6 (20.1)	−1.8 (28.8)	4.8 (40.6)	11.3 (52.3)	16.4 (61.5)	19.5 (67.1)	19.2 (66.6)	14.7 (58.5)	8.6 (47.5)	2.5 (36.5)	−4.4 (24.1)	6.3 (43.3)
Mean daily minimum °C (°F)	−13.0 (8.6)	−11.3 (11.7)	−6.1 (21.0)	0.2 (32.4)	5.8 (42.4)	10.8 (51.4)	14.2 (57.6)	13.9 (57.0)	9.7 (49.5)	4.2 (39.6)	−1.0 (30.2)	−8.2 (17.2)	1.6 (34.9)
Record low °C (°F)	−34.4 (−29.9)	−37.8 (−36.0)	−31.1 (−24.0)	−15.0 (5.0)	−5.0 (23.0)	−0.6 (30.9)	4.4 (39.9)	3.3 (37.9)	−3.9 (25.0)	−8.9 (16.0)	−20.6 (−5.1)	−33.3 (−27.9)	−37.8 (−36.0)
Average precipitation mm (inches)	104.6 (4.12)	77.3 (3.04)	100.7 (3.96)	89.4 (3.52)	105.8 (4.17)	86.1 (3.39)	96.9 (3.81)	86.5 (3.41)	86.1 (3.39)	105.7 (4.16)	101.8 (4.01)	98.4 (3.87)	1,139.2 (44.85)
Average snowfall cm (inches)	67.4 (26.5)	44.8 (17.6)	52.2 (20.6)	14.5 (5.7)	0.4 (0.2)	0.0 (0.0)	0.0 (0.0)	0.0 (0.0)	0.0 (0.0)	0.6 (0.2)	13.5 (5.3)	41.1 (16.2)	234.5 (92.3)
Average precipitation days	13.8	11.4	14.6	14.3	15.0	14.6	14.1	13.1	13.3	13.7	15.3	13.8	167.6
Source: Environment Canada

Gagetown Lighthouse
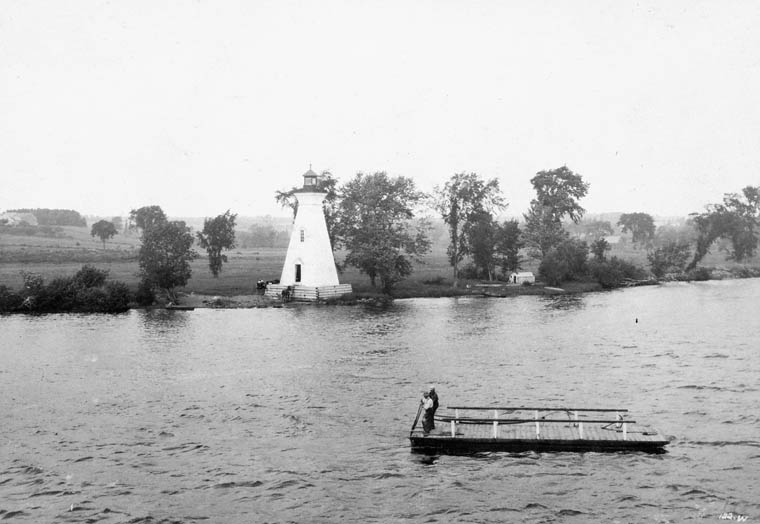
- Location: Gagetown; New Brunswick; Canada
- Coordinates: 45°46′6.93″N 66°8′25.27″W

Tower
- Constructed: 1895 (first)
- Foundation: wooden piles
- Construction: wooden tower (first and current)
- Height: 9.7 metres (32 ft) (current); 14.3 metres (47 ft) (first)
- Shape: low square frustum skeletal tower with watch room, balcony and lantern (current) tapered square frustum tower with balcony and lantern (first)
- Markings: white tower and watch room, red lantern (current) white tower, red lantern (first)
- Power source: mains electricity
- Operator: Canadian Coast Guard

Light
- First lit: 1934 (current)
- Focal height: 11.9 metres (39 ft) (current); 16 metres (52 ft) (first)
- Lens: Chance Brothers seventh-order drum dioptric
- Range: 8 nautical miles (15 km; 9.2 mi)
- Characteristic: F G

== Demographics ==
In the 2021 Census of Population conducted by Statistics Canada, Gagetown had a population of 787 living in 315 of its 341 total private dwellings, a change of 10.7% from its 2016 population of 711. With a land area of 49.32 km^{2} (19.04 sq mi), it had a population density of 16.0/km^{2} (41.3/sq mi) in 2021.

== Notable people ==
- John Montgomery was born in Gagetown. He owned the tavern (Montgomery's Tavern in Toronto, Ontario) which served as a base for the rebels during the Upper Canada Rebellion. His parents were loyalists who fled from New York following the American revolution.
- Annie Babbitt Bulyea (1863–1934) was born in Gagetown. She was a Canadian temperance leader.

== See also ==
- List of lighthouses in New Brunswick
- List of communities in New Brunswick
