= Jemseg River =

River in New Brunswick, Canada

Coordinates: 45°48′0″N 66°6′0″W

The Jemseg River is a short river in the Canadian province of New Brunswick which drains Grand Lake into the Saint John River.

The river is fairly slow-flowing, with approximately 5 kilometres of meander length. It passes through a savannah-type environment and is augmented by the Grand Lake Meadows. The river is relatively deep, and its main channel hosted regular tug-barge traffic until the late 1960s, the last commercial shipping on the Saint John River system.

The river begins at the southern end of Grand Lake at the community of Jemseg, where it is bridged by Route 2, the Trans-Canada Highway, using the new Jemseg River High Level Crossing twin bridges which opened in October 2002. These supplanted the original 1960s-era Jemseg River Bridge, which carried the Trans-Canada Highway on its original alignment, since renumbered to Route 105.

The river drains into the Saint John River at the community of Lower Jemseg, opposite the village of Arcadia.

== See also ==
- List of bodies of water of New Brunswick
