= Brunswick Parish, New Brunswick =

Brunswick
- Parish
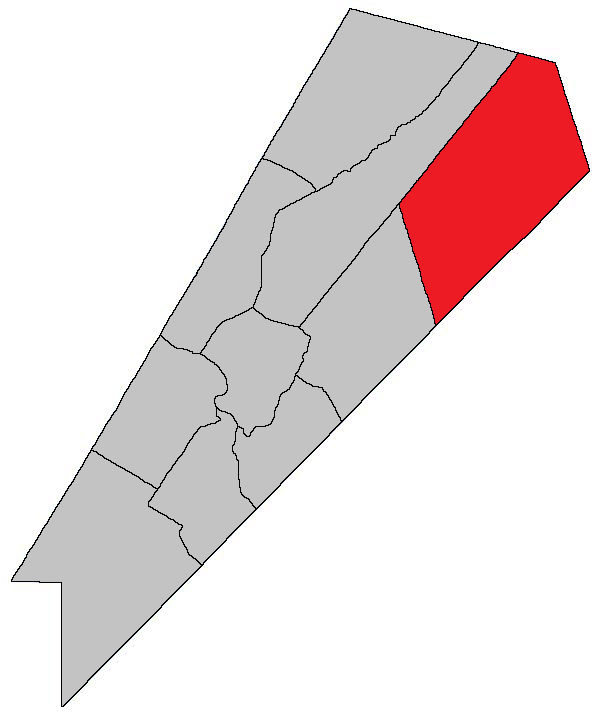
- Location within Queens County, New Brunswick.
- Coordinates: 45.84°N 64.59°W
- Country: Canada
- Province: New Brunswick
- County: Queens County
- Erected: 1816

Area
  - Land: 703.20 km^{2} (271.51 sq mi)

Population (2021)
  - Total: 224
  - Density: 0.3/km^{2} (0.78/sq mi)
  - Change 2016-2021: ▲10.3%
  - Dwellings: 193
- Time zone: UTC-4 (AST)
  - Summer (DST): UTC-3 (ADT)

Brunswick is a geographic parish in the northeastern corner of Queens County, New Brunswick, Canada.

Prior to the 2023 governance reform, for governance purposes it formed the local service district of the parish of Brunswick, which was a member of Kings Regional Service Commission (RSC8).

== Origin of name ==
The parish was probably named in honour of the Duke of Brunswick, German military leader against Napoleon, killed at the Battle of Quatre-Bras the year before the parish's erection.

== History ==
In 1786, New Brunswick chose to set up the province's system of counties and parishes as first Act of the legislation, replacing the counties established the year before through a series of Letters Patent and the township system that was inherited from Nova Scotia in 1784. The eastern boundary of Queens County passed approximately through Coles Island and the Gaspereau Forks on the Salmon River but the rear lines of Waterborough and Wickham Parishes ran approximately through Hunters Home and Chipman, extending into Westmorland and Northumberland Counties. The county line was moved eastward in 1787 by as much as 30 miles (48 km) in the north, created a large area that was not part of any parish; this area included large parts of Chipman and Waterborough Parishes in addition to most of modern Brunswick.

In 1816, this unassigned area was erected as Brunswick Parish; because the county line had not been surveyed yet, any inhabitants of the New Canaan settlement were to belong to Brunswick Parish.

In 1835, part of Brunswick was included in the newly erected Chipman Parish.

== Boundaries ==
Brunswick Parish is bounded:

- on the northeast east by the Kent County line;
- on the east by the Westmorland County line;
- on the southeast by the Kings County line;
- on the west by a line running north-northwesterly from north of the end of Chittick Road in Marrtown, crossing the Canaan River east of Phillips Brook and striking the Waterborough Parish line about 2 kilometres northwest of Parks Lake;
- on the northwest by a line running north 54º east (Note: By the magnet of 1786, when declination at the starting point was a bit more than 14º west of north.) from a point on the Saint John River about 1.8 kilometres southwest of the Route 715 bridge over McAlpines Brook.

== Communities ==
Communities at least partly within the parish. bold indicates an incorporated municipality

- Alward
- Brookvale
- Canaan Forks
- Cherryvale
- Forks Stream
- Hunters Home
- New Canaan

== Bodies of water ==
Bodies of water (Note: Not including brooks, ponds or coves.) at least partly within the parish.

- Canaan River
- Forks Stream
- Long Creek
- Cranberry Lake
- Lake Stream Lake
- Lower Lake
- Parks Lake
- Snowshoe Lake

== Other notable places ==
Parks, historic sites, and other noteworthy places at least partly within the parish.

- Brookvale Protected Natural Area
- Canaan Bog Protected Natural Area
- Cranberry Lake Protected Natural Area

== Demographics ==
Revised census figures based on the 2023 local governance reforms have not been released.

=== Population ===
Population trend

Census	Population	Change (%)
2016	203	▲5.7%
2011	192	▼20.7%
2006	242	▼2.8%
2001	249	

=== Language ===
Mother tongue (2016)

Language	Population	Pct (%)
English only	180	87.8%
French only	20	9.8%
Both English and French	0	0%
Other languages	5	2.4%

== Access Routes ==
Highways and numbered routes that run through the parish, including external routes that start or finish at the parish limits:

- **Highways**
  - Route 2 (TCH)
- **Principal Routes**
  - Route 112
- Secondary Routes:
  - None
- External Routes:
  - None

== See also ==
- List of parishes in New Brunswick
