= New Brunswick Route 710 =

Highway in New Brunswick, Canada

Route 710

Route information
- Maintained by New Brunswick Department of Transportation
- Length: 44 km (27 mi)

Major junctions
- South end: Route 124 in Hatfield Point
- Route 705 in Henderson Settlement; Route 695 in Arcadia
- North end: Route 10 in Long Creek

Location
- Country: Canada
- Province: New Brunswick
- Major cities: Arcadia

Highway system
- Provincial highways in New Brunswick; Former routes
← Route 705	→ Route 715

Route 710 is a highway in New Brunswick, Canada that runs from an intersection of Route 124 in Hatfield Point to an intersection with Route 10 in Long Creek.

== Communities ==
- Hatfield Point
- The Grant
- Henderson Settlement
- Big Cove
- Arcadia
- Hammtown
- Thornetown
- Codys
- Chambers Corner

== See also ==
- List of New Brunswick provincial highways
