= William Currie (Canadian politician) =

Canadian politician

MLA for Restigouche County
- In office 1908 to 1912; 1917 to 1920

Personal details
- Born: September 21, 1862 Upper Charlo, New Brunswick
- Died: May 30, 1934 (aged 71) Campbellton, New Brunswick
- Party: Liberal Party of New Brunswick
- Spouse: Minnie Murray
- Children: 10

William Currie (September 21, 1862 – May 30, 1934) was a manufacturer and political figure in New Brunswick, Canada. He represented Restigouche County in the Legislative Assembly of New Brunswick from 1908 to 1912 and from 1917 to 1920 as a Liberal member.

He was born in Upper Charlo, New Brunswick, the son of Ronald Currie and Margaret McCurdy. In 1890, he married Marie Murray. He was named speaker for the provincial assembly in 1917 but resigned that post. He lived in Campbellton. Currie was a member of the Masonic Lodge.

He died May 30, 1934 of heart disease.

Political offices
Preceded by Olivier-Maximin Melanson	Speaker of the Legislative Assembly of New Brunswick; 1917–1918	Succeeded by Judson Hetherington
