= Canning Parish, New Brunswick =

Coordinates: 45.9666°N 66.0917°W

Canning
- Parish
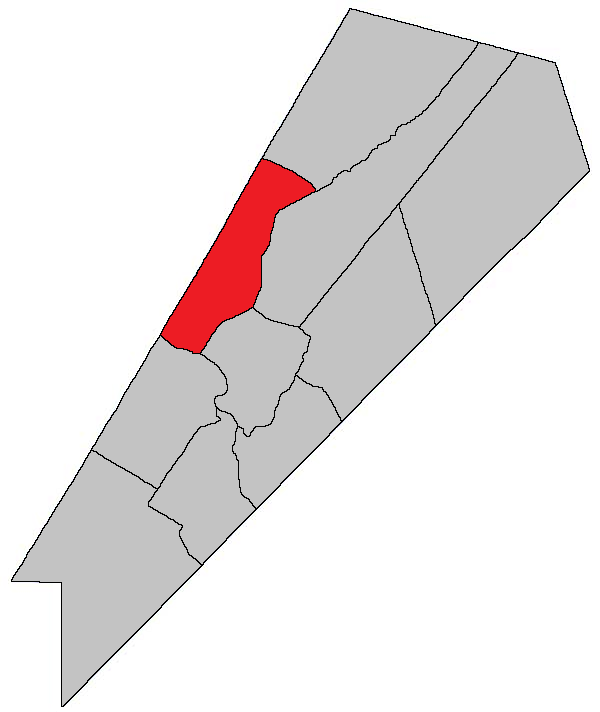
- Location within Queens County, New Brunswick.
- Country: Canada
- Province: New Brunswick
- County: Queens County
- Erected: 1827

Area
  - Land: 173.25 km^{2} (66.89 sq mi)

Population (2021)
  - Total: 1,028
  - Density: 5.9/km^{2} (15/sq mi)
  - Change 2016-2021: ▲11.3%
  - Dwellings: 850
- Time zone: UTC-4 (AST)
  - Summer (DST): UTC-3 (ADT)
- Figures do not include portion within the village of Minto

Canning is a geographic parish in Queens County, New Brunswick, Canada.

Prior to the 2023 governance reform, for governance purposes it was divided between the village of Minto and the local service district of the parish of Canning, both of which were members of Capital Region Service Commission (RSC11).

== Origin of name ==
The parish was probably named in honour of George Canning, British Secretary of State for Foreign Affairs and Leader of the House of Commons at the time. Shortly after the parish's erection Canning became Prime Minister of the United Kingdom.

== History ==
Canning was erected in 1827 from Waterborough Parish.

In 1835 the northwestern part of Canning was included in the newly erected Chipman Parish.

== Boundaries ==
Canning is bounded:

- on the northeast by a line beginning on the Sunbury County line about 400 metres north-northeasterly of Minto, then running east-southeasterly for about 1.2 km before turning to run south 45º east (Note: By the magnet of 1835, when declination in the area was about 17º west of north. The Territorial Division Act clause referring to magnetic direction bearings was omitted in the 1952 and 1973 Revised Statutes.) to Salmon Bay, then in a direct line to Indian Point, then into the Northeast Arm of Grand Lake;
- on the southeast by a line through Grand Lake, passing through Northeast Arm and west of Goat Island, then through the isthmus to the Saint John River, passing east of the Route 2 interchange with Route 105 and Conservation Road;
- on the southwest by the Saint John River;
- on the northwest by the Sunbury County line.

== Communities ==
Communities at least partly within the parish. bold indicates an incorporated municipality

- Clarks Corners
- Douglas Harbour
- Flowers Cove
- Maquapit Lake
- Newcastle Centre
- Newcastle Creek
- Princess Park
- Scotchtown
- **Minto**
  - Newcastle Bridge
  - Rothwell
  - South Minto

== Bodies of water ==
Bodies of water (Note: Not including brooks, ponds or coves.) at least partly within the parish.

- Grand Lake Little River
- Saint John River
- Baltimore Stream
- Main Thoroughfare
- Newcastle Creek
- Otter Creek
- Coys Gut
- Back Lake
- Lower Timber Lake
- Maquapit Lake
- The Keyhole
- Grand Lake
  - Douglas Harbour
  - Newcastle Bay
  - Northeast Arm
  - Salmon Bay

== Islands ==
Islands at least partly within the parish.

- Hunters Island
- Marshalls Island
- Thatch Island
- Grand Point Bar

== Other notable places ==
Parks, historic sites, and other noteworthy places at least partly within the parish.

- Grand Lake Protected Natural Area
- Pickerel Pond Nature Preserve

== Demographics ==
Parish population total does not portion within former incorporated village of Minto. Revised census figures based on the 2023 local governance reforms have not been released.

=== Population ===
Population trend

Census	Population	Change (%)
2016	924	▼2.9%
2011	952	▲0.2%
2006	950	▲2.8%
2001	924	

=== Language ===
Mother tongue (2016)

Language	Population	Pct (%)
English only	865	94.0%
French only	45	4.9%
Both English and French	0	0.00%
Other languages	10	1.1%

== Access Routes ==
Highways and numbered routes that run through the parish, including external routes that start or finish at the parish limits:

- **Highways**
  - Route 2 (TCH)
- **Principal Routes**
  - Route 105
- Secondary Routes:
  - Route 690
- External Routes:
  - None

== See also ==
- List of parishes in New Brunswick
