= Petersville Parish, New Brunswick =

Coordinates: 45.537618°N 66.356735°W

Petersville
- Parish
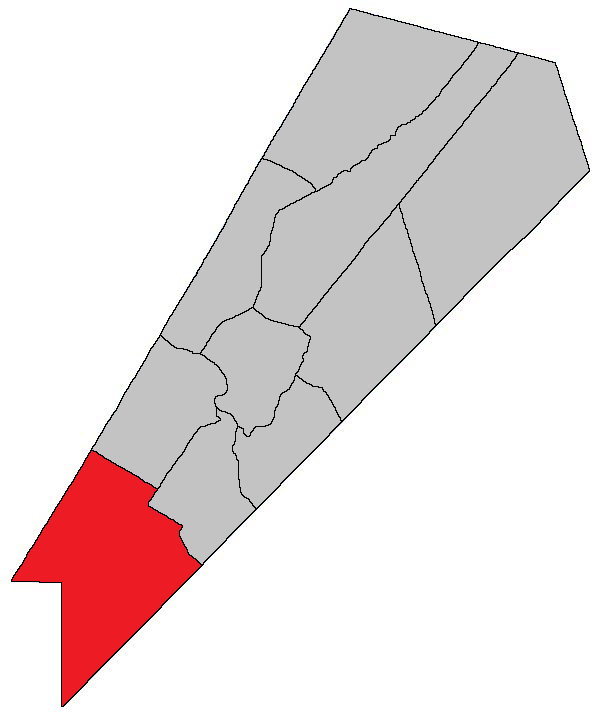
- Location within Queens County, New Brunswick.
- Country: Canada
- Province: New Brunswick
- County: Queens County
- Erected: 1838

Area
  - Land: 589.95 km^{2} (227.78 sq mi)

Population (2021)
  - Total: 710
  - Density: 1.2/km^{2} (3.1/sq mi)
  - Change 2016-2021: ▲4.3%
  - Dwellings: 323
- Time zone: UTC-4 (AST)
  - Summer (DST): UTC-3 (ADT)

Petersville is a geographic parish in Queens County, New Brunswick, Canada.

Prior to the 2023 governance reform, for governance purposes it was divided between CFB Gagetown and the local service districts of Wirral-Enniskillen and the parish of Petersville. Wirral-Enniskillen was part of Capital Region Service Commission (RSC11) and Petersville Parish was part of the Fundy Regional Service Commission (FRSC).

== Origin of name ==
William Francis Ganong states that the parish was named in honour of Harry Peters, then Speaker of the House of Assembly. Peters' tenure as Speaker actually ended in 1827 but he continued to serve as MLA until 1843. Harry's brother Charles Jeffery Peters was Attorney General of New Brunswick when the parish was erected.

== History ==
Petersville was erected in 1838 from Gagetown and Hampstead Parishes.

Much of the parish was expropriated in 1953 for the creation of CFB Gagetown.

== Boundaries ==
Petersville Parish is bounded:

- on the northeast and east within CFB Gagetown (Note: Roads still appear on cadastral maps but not in highway mapbooks; because the old roads and grants are used in the Territorial Division Act they're used here.) by a line beginning at the prolongation of the southwestern line of a grant to Thomas T. Hewlett at the corner of Lawfield and Kerr Roads in Summer Hill, then southwesterly following Lawfield Road to the westernmost corner of a grant to Henry Appleby, then southeasterly along the prolongation of the northeastern line of a grant to Sylvanus Haviland to its easternmost corner, then southwest to the Yorkshire Road, then along Yorkshire Road to the Kings County line;
- on the southeast by the Kings County line;
- on the southwest by the Charlotte County line;
- on the northwest by the Sunbury County line.

== Communities ==
Communities at least partly within the parish. italics indicate a community expropriated for CFB Gagetown

- Armstrong Corner
- Bayard
- Blakely
- Clarendon
- Clones
- Cootes Hill
- Dunns Corner
- Enniskillen
- Ferris
- Fowlers Corners
- Headline
- Loisville
- Olinville
- Petersville
- South Clones
- Summer Hill
- Vincent
- Welsford
- West Jerusalem
- Wirral
- Wirral Station

== Bodies of water ==
Bodies of water (Note: Not including brooks, ponds or coves.) at least partly within the parish.

- River George
- West Branch Musquash River
- Brittain Stream
- Crystal Stream
- Cunningham Creek
- more than fifteen officially named lakes

== Other notable places ==
Parks, historic sites, and other noteworthy places at least partly within the parish.

- CFB Gagetown
- Lepreau River Wildlife Management Area
- Loch Alva Protected Natural Area

== Demographics ==
=== Population ===
Population trend

Census	Population	Change (%)
2016	681	▼5.8%
2011	723	▼4.6%
2006	758	

=== Language ===
Mother tongue (2016)

Language	Population	Pct (%)
English only	645	94.2%
French only	35	5.1%
Both English and French	0	0%
Other languages	5	0.7%

== Access Routes ==
Highways and numbered routes that run through the parish, including external routes that start or finish at the parish limits:

- Highways
  - Route 7
- Principal Routes
  - Route 101
- None
- External Routes:
  - None
