= Annie Babbitt Bulyea =

Canadian temperance leader (1863–1934)

Annie Babbitt Bulyea (17 September 1863 – 27 August 1934) was a Canadian temperance leader. She was the honorary president of the Dominion Woman's Christian Temperance Union (W. C. T. U.), and president of the Baptist Women's Missionary society of western Canada.

== Biography ==
Annie Blanche Babbitt was born at Gagetown, Queens County, New Brunswick, Canada, 17 September 1863. She was the second daughter of Robert Thorne Babbit, Registrar of Queens County, New Brunswick. She was educated in the public schools of Gagetown.

Bulyea became a member of the W. C. T. U. in New Brunswick; and on taking up her residence in Saskatchewan, she at once affiliated with the local union at Qu'Appelle, of which body she became president. In 1899, she removed to Regina, in the same province, where her ability found early recognition and she was elected president. Later, she was chosen superintendent of W. C. T. U. work in the Northwest Territories. Removing to Alberta in 1905, she was made honorary president of Edmonton Union.

Since that time, Bulyea was chosen honorary president of the Alberta Provincial W. C. T. U., and also of the Dominion W. C. T. U. She also served as president of the Baptist Women's Missionary society of western Canada.

== Personal life ==
She married George H. V. Bulyea in 1885, and removed with him to western Canada. He was a politician and the first Lieutenant Governor of Alberta. They had one son, in 1885, Percy McFarlane Bulyea, who died at the age of fifteen on February 5, 1901, of a paralytic affliction. The Bulyeas were active members of the Baptist Church.

After her husband's retirement, the Bulyeas moved, and settled in Peachland, British Columbia, where they had previously resided during summers, at their four-hectare fruit orchard and summer home.

Annie Blanche Babbitt Bulyea died at Edmonton, 27 August 1934. Burial was in the Qu'Appelle cemetery.
