= Waterborough, New Brunswick =

Waterborough
- Location within New Brunswick
- Coordinates: 45°54′N 66°00′W
- Country: Canada
- Province: New Brunswick
- County: Queens

Government
  - Type: Town

Waterborough is a settlement in Waterborough Parish, New Brunswick, Canada.

== See also ==
- List of communities in New Brunswick
