= Jemseg =

Community in New Brunswick, Canada

Coordinates: 45°49′47.5″N 66°6′29.4″W

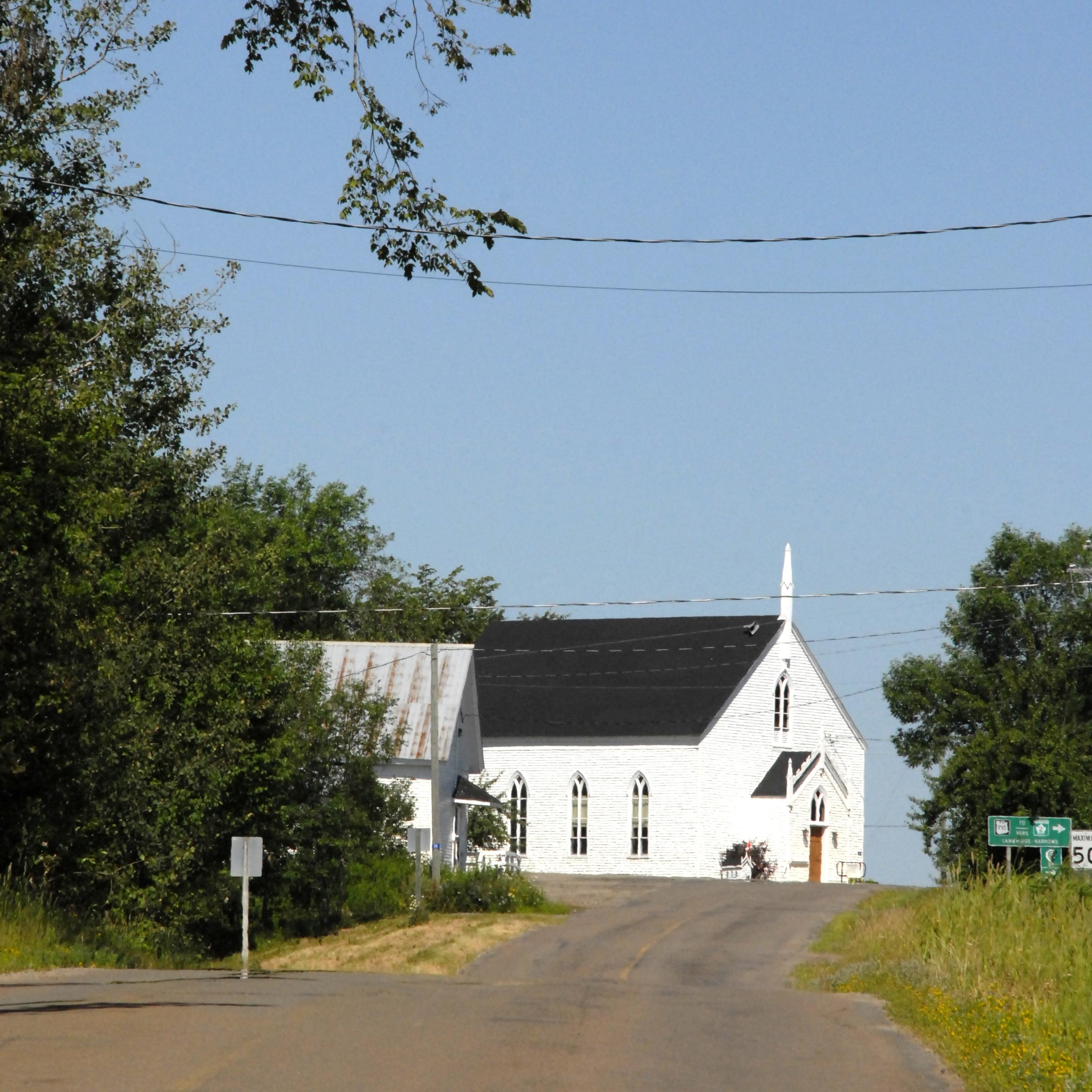
Jemseg NB

Jemseg is a Canadian rural community in Cambridge Parish, Queens County, New Brunswick. It is located on the east bank of the Jemseg River along its short run from Grand Lake to the Saint John River. The village briefly served as the Capital of Acadia (1690–91).

== History ==
=== Early history ===
==== Maliseet ====
Prior to European contact in the 16th century the Wolastoqiyik (also called the Maliseet or Malecites) and other aboriginal peoples lived along the banks of the Wolastoq (the "good" or "beautiful" river, named the "Saint John River" by the first European explorers) for thousands of years. Trading and travel were widespread due to the confluence of rivers and lakes that occurs in this area. The expanse of Grand Lake moderated the local climate and resources were abundant. Spring runs of gaspereau and salmon, winter herds of caribou, other game and, of course a good variety of wild plants from fiddleheads in spring to butternuts in fall were available to hunters and gatherers.

Most "Jemsegers" live along the banks of the short, deep Jemseg River that flows from Grand Lake to the Saint John River. Locals speak of two villages, "Upper" and "Lower" Jemseg. Jemseg is probably the oldest name in Queens County. The name Jemseg is said to come from a Wolastoqey word Ah-jem-sik, meaning "picking up place", a reference to the trade that traditionally took place here during the pre-contact period and through both the English and French occupation of the area. The French name for Jemseg, Gemesic, is also based on this. The name is applied to what initially were two villages, Lower Jemseg and Upper Jemseg.

==== 17th Century ====
The history of Jemseg is a microcosm of the whole story of Acadia, the eastern provinces of Canada that passed back and forth between the French and English after 1604.

English proprietor of Nova Scotia Col. Thomas Temple established the first trading post at Jemseg near the mouth of the river (1659). This was a fortified post convenient for trade with the Maliseet. However Temple's prosperity was short-lived for Acadia was restored to the French in 1667.

A spring flood in 1696 caused late planting and crop failures.

==== Raid on Jemseg (1674) ====
Sieur Pierre de Joybert de Soulanges et de Marson lived here when the fort was attacked in 1674 by Dutch naval captain Jurriaen Aernoutsz during the Franco-Dutch War.

After the death of Soulanges in 1678 it was occupied by the d'Amours brothers, Louis and Mathieu, who are recognized as the first farmers at Jemseg. So farming in this area has a 300-year history although nowadays strawberries, potatoes and market vegetables are the chief crops grown while beef cattle and light horses are the only stock traded commercially.

Governor of Acadia Joseph Robineau de Villebon established the village as the Capital of Acadia (1690–91). Around 1700, Fort Jemseg was abandoned for military purposes although it was still used as a trading post. A flood in 1701 caused losses to crops and cattle. The settlement was relocated to Port Royal, Nova Scotia.

==== Raid on Jemseg (1758) ====
By the Treaty of Utrecht in 1713, Acadia was ceded to the English for the final time. Ownership of present-day New Brunswick, however, remained in dispute until the conclusion of the French and Indian War. It seems likely that Acadians lived and farmed in the area until 1758 when General Monckton razed the settlement during the St. John River Campaign.

==== British Colony ====
Between then and 1783, a handful of English-speaking pre-Loyalist families settled on the Jemseg (the Nevers, Garrison and Estabrooks for example), but it was the United Empire Loyalists after the American Revolution (1783) who really caused the village to grow. Loyalist names like Dykeman, Ferris, Gunter and Currie and, until recently Colwell, are still represented in the community and these people often live on the same land granted to their ancestors in the 18th century.

=== Nineteenth Century ===
Due to increasing population, Jemseg became a part of Cambridge Parish when it was created from Waterborough Parish and Wickham Parish in 1852.

==== Churches ====
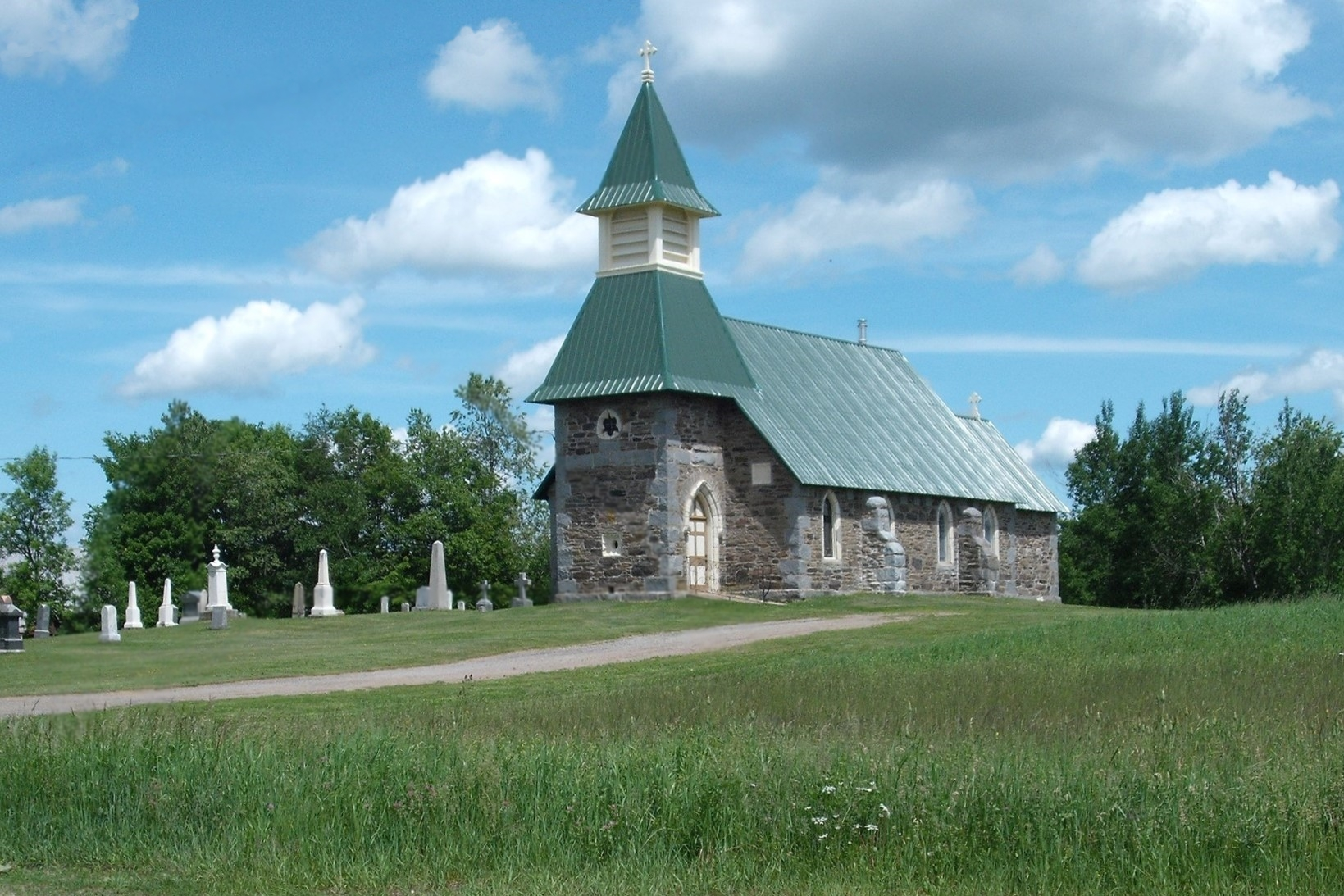
St. James church in Lower Jemseg

As the communities grew, churches and schools were built. Initially itinerant clergy from the Church of England, and a bit later Baptist clergy also travelled from place to place. The Anglican rector of Gagetown at Gagetown began work in 1785 and for several decades performed the rituals of baptism, marriages and burials. By the early 1820s the Society for the Propagation of the Gospel had sent Rev. Abraham Wood to the Grand Lake pastorate, and by the mid-twenties the Baptist Church, the so-called "Canning Church" was serving the Baptists of the area. Schools appear to have begun very early in the 19th century; certainly there were at least three schools in the area when the first school inspection was done in 1844. One school was in the vicinity of the corner and the stone church (St James's Anglican) at Lower Jemseg, a second was somewhere near the supposed division between Upper and Lower just below Stuart and Lori Appt's farm, and the third was on the banks of a little brook that runs into Grand Lake between the Walter Gunter and Turner farms.

During the two plus centuries since the Loyalists came, the population has remained relatively stable with new arrivals mixing with the older settlers. Schools, stores and businesses have come and gone. Churches have been built. St. James (Anglican) built in 1887 at Lower Jemseg is an architectural gem, and the Jemseg Baptist Church which dates from the mid-19th century is typical of rural churches throughout the country.

==== Wooden ships ====
Concurrently with the development of churches and schools, tradesmen started to appear. Besides teachers and clergymen, blacksmiths, carpenters, mariners, tanners, student, shoemakers, weavers, and, of course, merchants appeared as necessity dictated. Also by mid-century the age of wooden ships was a reality, and men began to build wooden boats, and even sea-going vessels along the banks of Jemseg Creek. At this point the riverboats were well established and throughout the navigation season there were boats coming from Saint John two or even three times a week, and returning on the following day - a good way to get farm produce to city markets and manufactured goods to people up river.

=== Twentieth and 21st centuries ===
==== Industry ====
As time went on mixed farming, and forestry in the off-season, were the primary occupations of the inhabitants with a few tradespeople as required. The population with Loyalist roots was supplemented from time to time by immigrants mainly from Scotland and Ireland but generally the population neither increased or decreased in numbers for two centuries. The reliance on agriculture and some forestry lasted until after World War II but then with mechanization, (changing from horses to tractors) and with a system of roads for transporting produce to markets, things changed rather quickly. The river boats ceased to operate in the 1940s, and by the early 21st century farms were uncommon. Over fifty years, Jemseg, like many other rural communities, changed from a thriving self-sufficient place to a community of retired people or those who travel each day to employment elsewhere. The village school has been gone since 1978, and while the churches still exist they are somewhat diminished as centres of community activity.

In Jemseg in 2006 there are two stores, one of which has existed in the same family for over 100 years. The local Lions organization is a going concern, as is the Farmers' Market which takes place at the Lions' Hall on Saturday mornings in summer. There are two Women's Institute Halls that serve as community meeting places, and both W.I.'s are active. There is a motel dating from the 1950s (Jemseg LakeView Motel) which is still in operation, and a green house operation has just begun. Community Days are celebrated in August. At the crossroads at "Upper" Jemseg a community garden has been developed.

== Geography ==
Early settlers were attracted to this place by several things. Firstly the system of rivers and lakes meant transportation was relatively easy through most of the year. Then there was an extensive old-growth forest which was used almost from the beginning for domestic building, and very profitably for masts and spars for the King's Navy. Thirdly, the river and Grand Lake, which is about 5 miles (8.0 km) wide and 25 miles (40 km) long, moderated the climate, giving an extended growing season. The land was fertile and quite flat, and quantities of marsh hay were there for the cutting. Most of the land grants were for 200 acres (0.81 km^{2}), and the majority of the settlers over the first decade or two established thriving farms.

== Transportation ==
Being located at the junction where the Jemseg River meets the Saint John River, and thus the entrance to Grand Lake, Jemseg has historically held an important place in the province's history of water transportation. Several wharves served steam powered river boats until being eclipsed by railways. In the early 1960s Jemseg was placed on the modern highway network with completion of the Trans-Canada Highway through New Brunswick; Route 2 crossed the Jemseg River on the Jemseg River Bridge. In 2002 a new 4-lane expressway alignment of Route 2 opened through the community, including a new bridge over the Jemseg River immediately upstream of the original, which was permanently closed in May 2015 after failing a safety inspection.

During the summer and fall one of the old wharves hosts the Jemseg Farmers' Market.

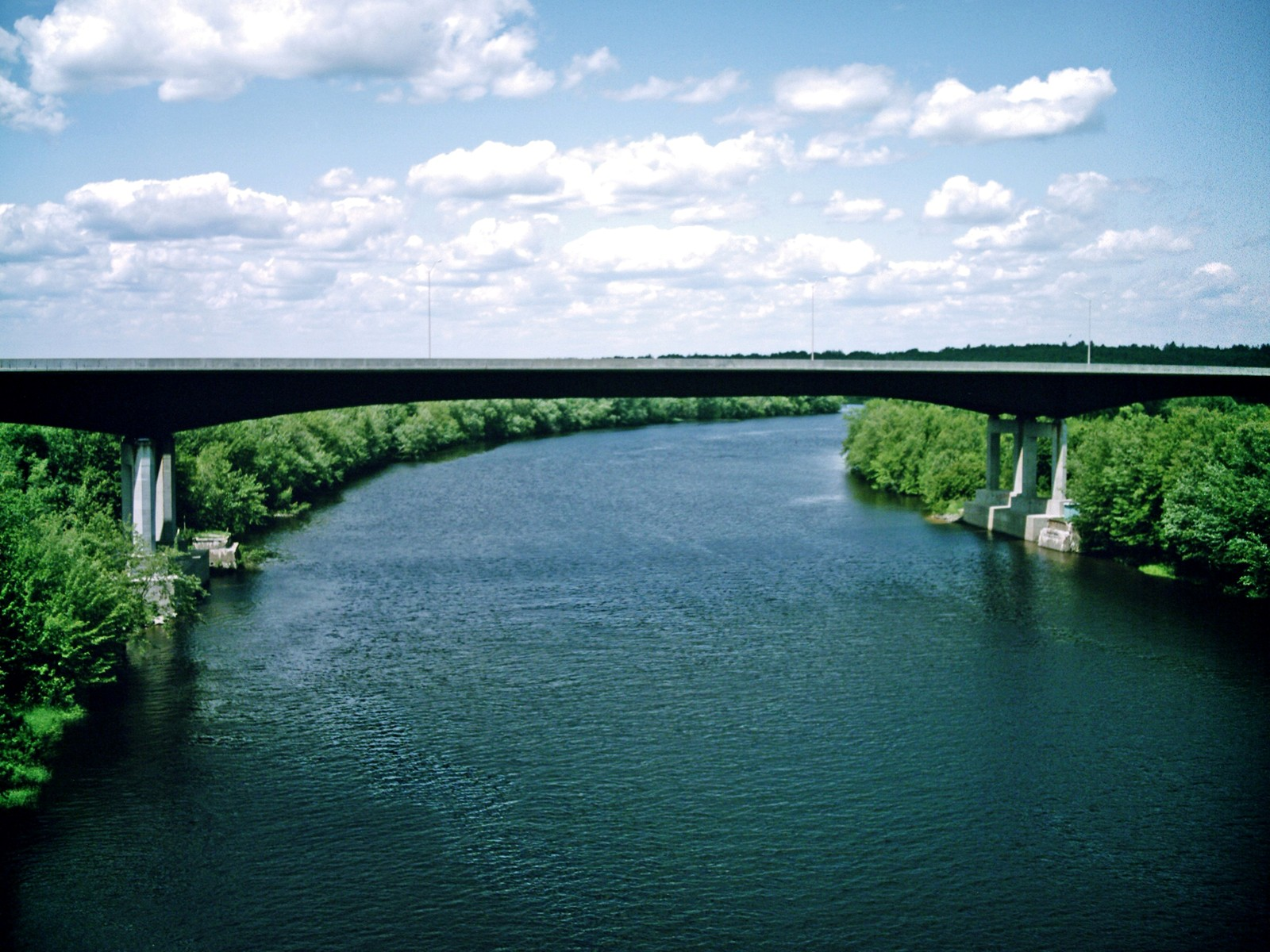
The TransCanada Highway bridge in Jemseg.

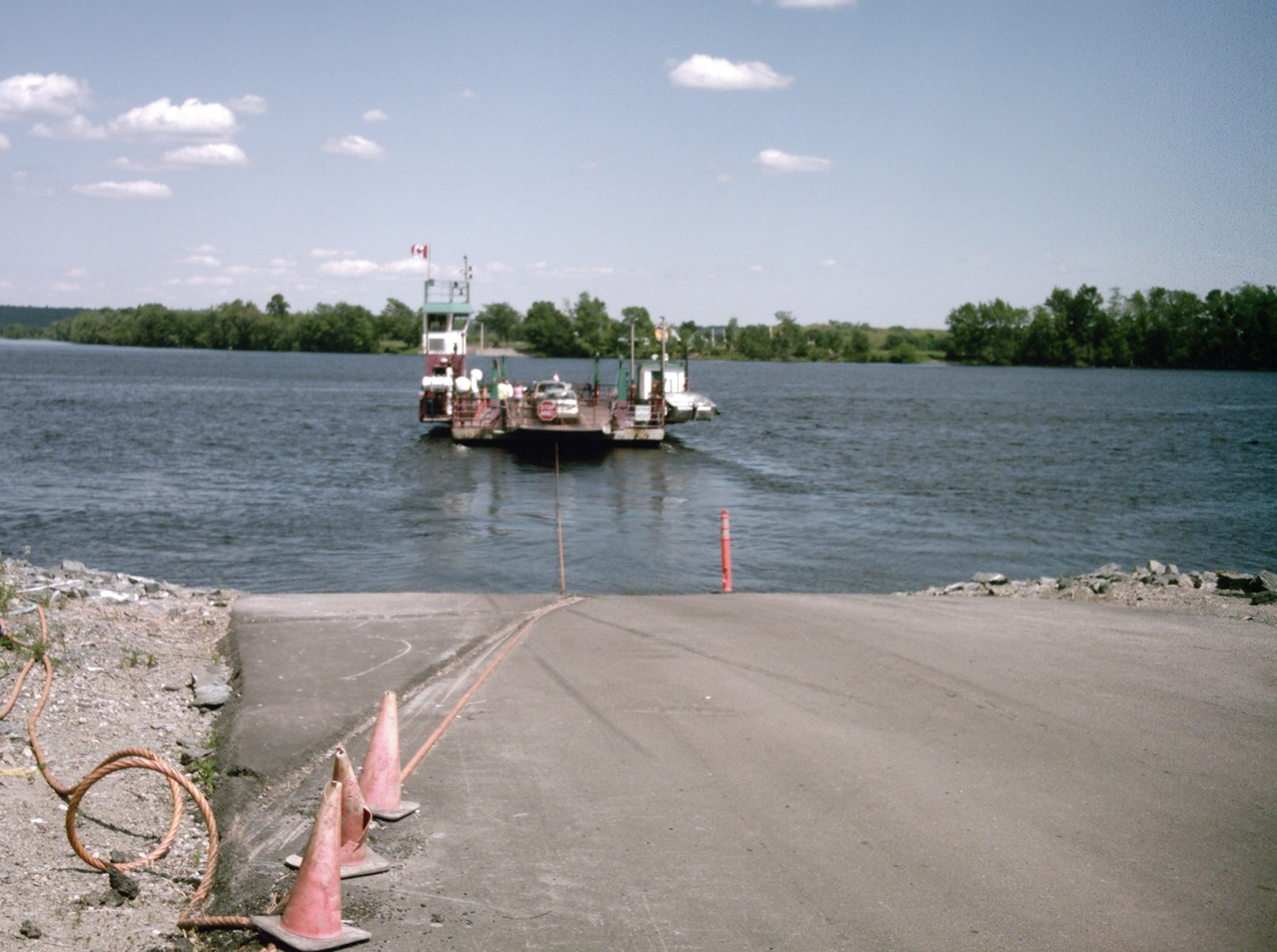
The ferry between Lower Jemseg and Arcadia.

== See also ==
- List of communities in New Brunswick
