= Wirral-Enniskillen =

Coordinates: 45°31′14.2″N 66°30′10.7″W

- community
- Etymology: Wirral Peninsula
- Interactive map of Wirral-Enniskillen
- Country: Canada
- Province: New Brunswick
- Parish: Petersville
- Founded: 1854

Area
  - community: 29.41 km^{2} (11.36 sq mi)
  - Rural: 29.41 km^{2} (11.36 sq mi)
- Elevation: 139 m (456 ft)

Population (2016)
  - community: 204
  - Density: 6.94/km^{2} (18.0/sq mi)

Wirral-Enniskillen is a former local service district in the Canadian province of New Brunswick. It is located at the confluence of the Gaspereau and Salmon rivers.

== History ==
Originally settled as Gaspereau and later Gaspereau Station, when it was a flag station on the Canadian Pacific Railway. It was renamed Wirral after the English peninsula of the same name in 1923.

Amalgamated with the former community of Enniskillen, which was among the communities expropriated for CFB Gagetown. It was first settled as Adair Settlement in 1826 by Irish immigrants and renamed Enniskillen after the town in Ireland. It also included the former farming community of Blakely, which merged in 1911.

== Demographics ==
In the 2021 Census of Population conducted by Statistics Canada, Wirral-Enniskillen had a population of 226 living in 96 of its 103 total private dwellings, a change of 10.8% from its 2016 population of 204. With a land area of 29.3 km^{2} (11.3 sq mi), it had a population density of 7.7/km^{2} (20.0/sq mi) in 2021.

Historical populations: Gaspereaux/Wirral, NB
| Year | Pop. | ±% |
|---|---|---|
| 1871 | 600 | — |
| 1898 | 40 | −93.3% |
| 1996 | 272 | +580.0% |
| 2001 | 821 | +201.8% |
| 2006 | 758 | −7.7% |
| 2011 | 226 | −70.2% |
| 2016 | 204 | −9.7% |

== See also ==
- List of communities in New Brunswick
