= New Brunswick Route 715 =

Highway in New Brunswick, Canada

Coordinates: 45.794818°N 65.97908°W

Route 715

Route information
- Maintained by New Brunswick Department of Transportation
- Length: 53 km (33 mi)

Major junctions
- West end: Route 695 in Jemseg
- East end: Route 10 / Route 112 in Coles Island

Location
- Country: Canada
- Province: New Brunswick

Highway system
- Provincial highways in New Brunswick; Former routes
← Route 710	→ Route 725

Route 715 is a 53.2-kilometre (33.1 mi) long local highway in Queens County, New Brunswick. Its western terminus is in Jemseg at Route 695 near its interchange with Route 2 (the Trans-Canada Highway) and its eastern terminus is in Coles Island at Route 10 and Route 112. It is signed as an east–west highway although its westernmost portion along the Saint John River runs nearly due north and south.

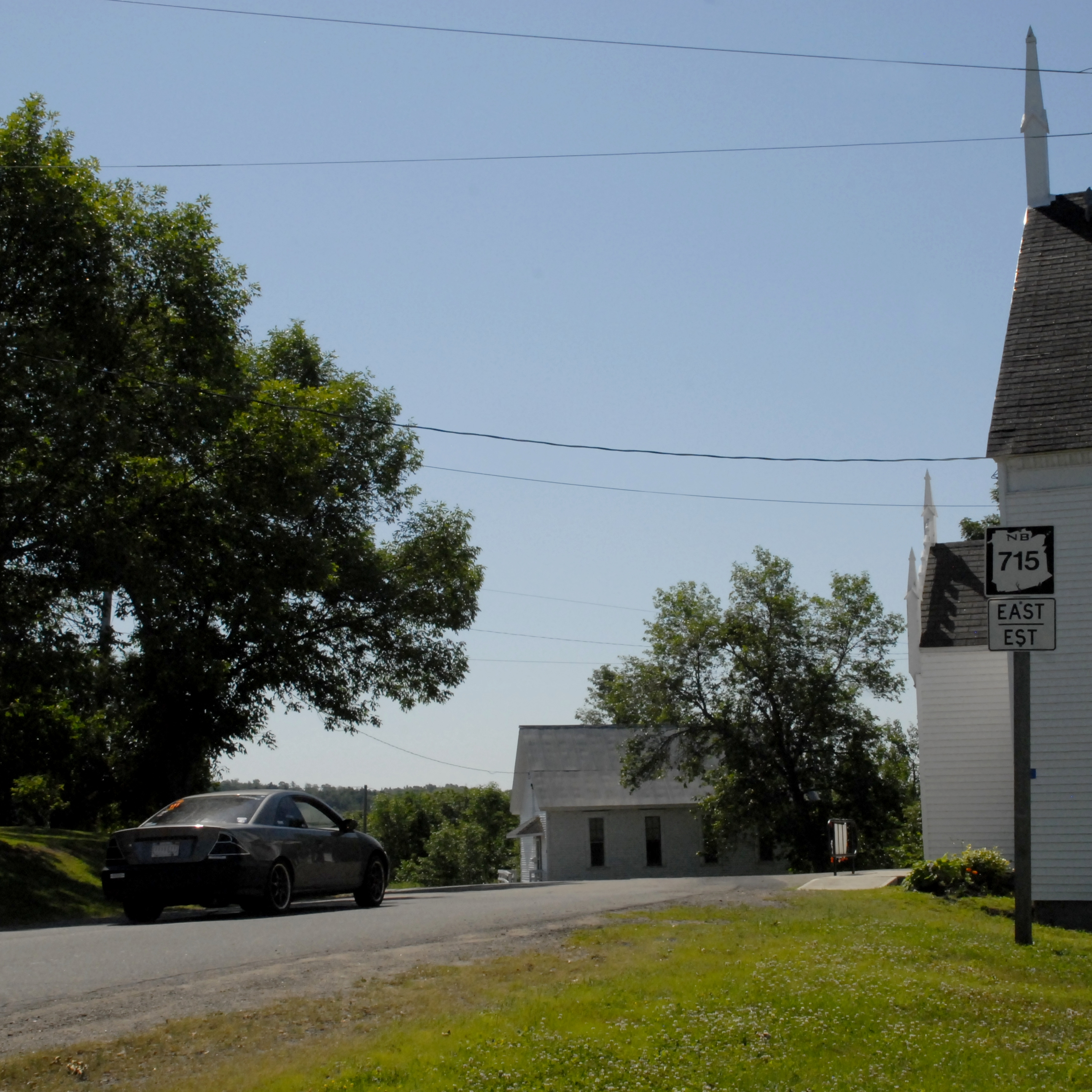
Route 715 near its western terminus in Jemseg

== Route description ==
The route starts at the intersection of Route 10 and Route 112 north of Coles Island, where it travels south along the east bank of the Canaan River. It travels through a mostly forested area past Chambres Corner and Washademoak where it takes a sharp turn west at Pattersons Cove. From here, road continues west to Picketts Cove where it passes around the cove and enters the community of Picketts Cove. The road continues southwest around Fowlers Cove where it intersects with Route 695 in Arcadia. Continuing, the road passes through McDonald Corner, Central Cambridge, and Lower Cambridge. At this point, the road takes a sharp turn northwest and heads towards Lower Jemseg. The final stretch passes by Dykeman Lake before ending at Jemseg at the western terminus of Route 695 on the Saint John River.

== Major junctions ==
The entire route is in Queens County.

Location	km	mi	Destinations	Notes
Jemseg	0.0	0.0	Route 695 (Grand Lake Drive) to Route 2 (TCH) / Route 105 – Arcadia, Fredericton, Moncton	
Arcadia	31.1	19.3	Route 695 – Jemseg	
Coles Island	53.0	32.9	Route 10 – Chipman, Sussex; Route 112 east – Salisbury	Western terminus of Route 112
1.000 mi = 1.609 km; 1.000 km = 0.621 mi
