= Picaroons Traditional Ales =

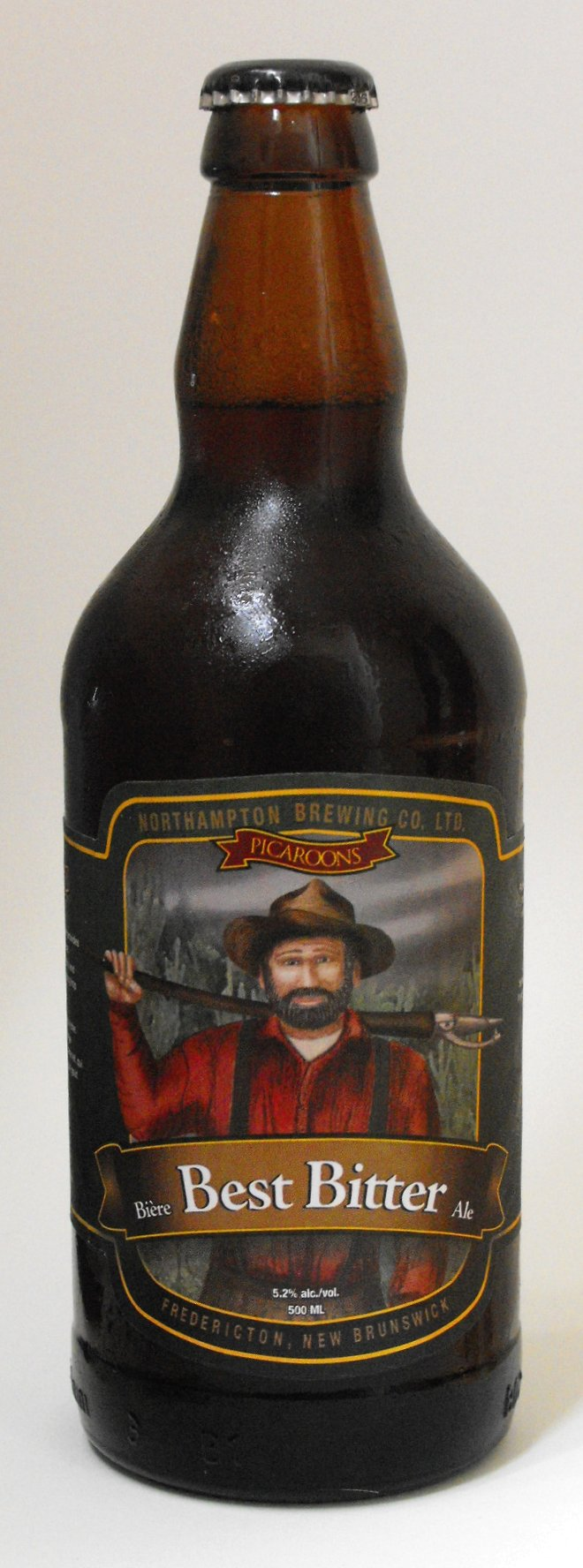
Picaroons Best Bitter, one of several brews under the Picaroons microbrewery brand

Picaroons Traditional Ales are a production of the Northampton Brewing Company Ltd., which was started in 1995 and is located in Fredericton, New Brunswick, Canada.

The Picaroons brand is sold in numerous taverns and restaurants in New Brunswick. It is also sold in bottles in New Brunswick liquor outlets and in a few other provinces.

A picaroon was a common tool used in the logging industry in New Brunswick.

In 2009, Picaroons became one of the first breweries in Canada to launch its own online social network at PicaroonsPub.com.

In 2010, Picaroons partnered with The Bar Towel, an Ontario craft beer web site, to distribute its beers in Ontario for the first time.

In 2011, Picaroons won brewery of the year at the Canadian Brewing Awards.

In 2016, Picaroons opened their new tap house and brewery at Fredericton's historic roundhouse in Devon.

In 2016, Picaroons opened a second location called The General Store on Saint John's historic Canterbury Street.

== Brewing ==
Several year-round and seasonal ales are produced at the Picaroons brewery. Brewing is done with malted barley imported from England and Germany, as well as whole hops from England, New Zealand and the North American west coast. The particulars of each batch are logged online for public access. This information includes information such as the ingredients, start date and time, and the specific gravity of the water used in a batch, etc.

Picaroons year-round beers are:

- Best Bitter
- Irish Red
- Simeon Jones River Valley Ale [Amber Ale]
- Blonde Ale
- Man's Best Friend [Porter]
- Yippee IPA
- Feels Good Imperial Pilsner
- Timber Hog Stout
- 506 Golden Ale
- 506 Pale Ale
- 506 Dark Wheat Ale
- Swallowtail Light
- Pivot Imperial IPA

Seasonal and special beer:

- Maple Cream Ale (spring)
- JED IPA (spring)
- Dooryard Summer Ale [Organic] (summer)
- Melon Head (summer)
- Pride Apricot Ale (summer)
- Harvest Ale (fall)
- Upstream Ale (introduced for conservation society)
- Winter Warmer (winter)
- Xmas Tree Pivot Imperial IPA (winter)
- Blitzen Coffee Stout (winter)

== Awards ==
Year	Competition	Category	Product	Place
2011	Canadian Brewing Awards	English Style India Pale Ale	Yippee IPA	Bronze
2011	Canadian Brewing Awards	Stout	Timber Hog Stout	Gold
2011	Canadian Brewing Awards	Wheat Beer – North American Style	Dooryard Summer Ale	Bronze
2011	Canadian Brewing Awards	English Style Pale Ale (Bitter)	Best Bitter	Gold
2010	Canadian Brewing Awards (Toronto)	North American Blond or Golden Ale	Blonde Ale	Bronze
2010	Canadian Brewing Awards (Toronto)	Bronze, North American Wheat Beer	Dooryard Summer Ale	Bronze
2008	Canadian Brewing Awards (Toronto)	English Style Pale Ale/Bitter	Best Bitter	Gold
2008	Canadian Brewing Awards (Toronto)	Porter	Man's Best Friend Porter	Bronze
n/a	World Beer Championships (Chicago)	n/a	Winter Warmer	Gold
n/a	Canadian Brewing Awards (Toronto)	Irish-style Red Ale	Irish Red	"Best in Canada"
