= Gagetown Parish, New Brunswick =

Coordinates: 45.7695°N 66.1716°W

Gagetown
- Parish
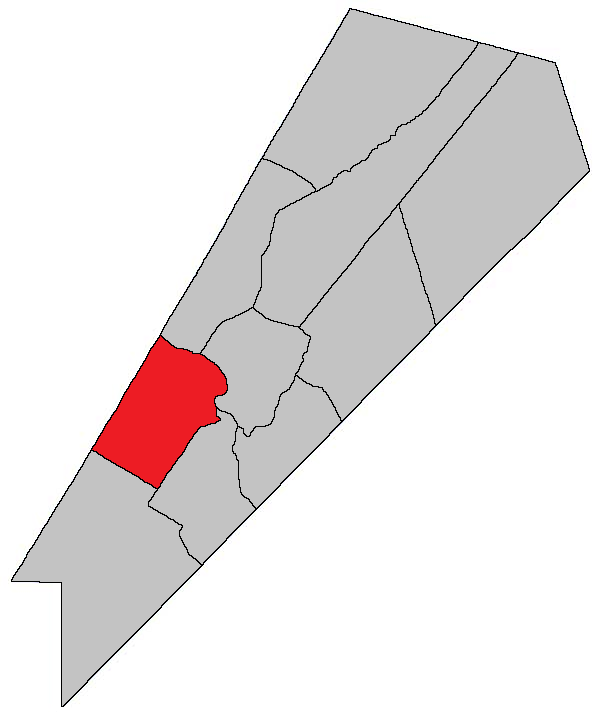
- Location within Queens County, New Brunswick.
- Country: Canada
- Province: New Brunswick
- County: Queens County
- Erected: 1786

Area
  - Land: 234.58 km^{2} (90.57 sq mi)

Population (2021)
  - Total: 324
  - Density: 1.4/km^{2} (3.6/sq mi)
  - Change 2016-2021: ▲4.2%
  - Dwellings: 149
- Time zone: UTC-4 (AST)
  - Summer (DST): UTC-3 (ADT)
- Figures do not include portion within the village of Gagetown

Gagetown is a geographic parish in Queens County, New Brunswick, Canada.

Prior to the 2023 governance reform, for governance purposes it was divided between CFB Gagetown, the village of Gagetown and the local service district of Upper Gagetown, the latter two of which were members of Capital Region Service Commission (RSC11).

== Origin of name ==
The original township was named in honour of General Thomas Gage, British Commander-in-Chief, North America at the time; he was principal grantee of the township.

== History ==
Gagetown was created in 1765 as Gage Township in Nova Scotia.

In 1786 the township formed the core of Gagetown Parish when New Brunswick erected its counties and parishes. The parish added territory back to the Charlotte County line.

In 1838 the rear of Gagetown was included in the newly erected Petersville Parish.

== Boundaries ==
Gagetown Parish is bounded

- on the northeast by the Saint John River;
- on the southeast by the southern line of a grant to Nathaniel Jarvis, which forms the southern boundary of the village of Gagetown, and running southwesterly to the rear of the grant, then turning left and running south 52º west, (Note: By the magnet of 1850, when declination at the starting point was about 18º 20' west of north. The Territorial Division Act clause referring to magnetic direction bearings was omitted in the 1952 and 1973 Revised Statutes.) crossing Route 102 and into CFB Gagetown, about 12 kilometres to the southernmost corner of a grant to Robert Nelson at the corner of Lawfield Road and Kerr Road in the former community of Summer Hill;
- on the southwest by the southwestern line of the Nelson grant prolonged to the Sunbury County line;
- on the northwest by the Sunbury County line;
- including Gagetown Island and Grimross Island.

== Communities ==
Communities at least partly within the parish. bold indicates an incorporated municipality; italics indicate a community expropriated for CFB Gagetown

- Coytown
- **Gagetown**
  - Mill Road
- Hersey Corner
- Lawfield
- Summer Hill
- Upper Gagetown

== Bodies of water ==
Bodies of water (Note: Not including brooks, ponds or coves.) at least partly within the parish.

- Saint John River
- Duck Creek
- Gagetown Creek
- Mount Creek
- Coys Lake
- Harts Lake

== Islands ==
Islands at least partly within the parish.

- Gagetown Island
- Grimross Island
- McAllisters Island

== Other notable places ==
Parks, historic sites, and other noteworthy places at least partly within the parish.

- CFB Gagetown
- Mount Ararat Wildlife Management Area

== Demographics ==
Parish population total does not include village of Gagetown

=== Population ===
Population trend

| Census | Population | Change (%) |
|---|---|---|
| 2016 | 311 | ▼1.6% |
| 2011 | 316 | ▲6.4% |
| 2006 | 297 | ▼5.4% |
| 2001 | 314 | ▲0.0% |

=== Language ===
Mother tongue language (2016)

| Language | Population | Pct (%) |
|---|---|---|
| French only | 10 | 3.2% |
| English only | 300 | 96.8% |
| Both English and French | 0 | 0.00% |
| Other languages | 0 | 0.00% |

== Access Routes ==
Highways and numbered routes that run through the parish, including external routes that start or finish at the parish limits:

- **Highways**
  - none
- **Principal Routes**
  - Route 102
- Secondary Routes:
  - None
- External Routes:
  - None

== See also ==
- List of parishes in New Brunswick
