= John Montgomery (tavern-keeper) =

John Montgomery (probably February 29, 1788 – October 31, 1879) owned the tavern which served as a base for the rebels during the Upper Canada Rebellion. His establishment was the site of the Battle of Montgomery's Tavern.

He was born in Gagetown, New Brunswick, the son of Alexander Montgomery who came there from Stamford, Connecticut after the American Revolution. In 1798, the family moved to York in Upper Canada. Montgomery served on the Niagara frontier during the War of 1812 and fought in the Battle of Queenston Heights. He operated a number of taverns in the York area, including The Bird in the Hand at Yonge Street and Finch Avenue, in 1828. He leased this inn out in 1830, and that year began building Montgomery's Tavern further south on Yonge Street. Montgomery was also a road commissioner for York County and a director for the Mutual Insurance Company.

Sympathetic with the concerns of the Reformers, Montgomery helped send William Lyon Mackenzie to England in 1832 to present petitions to the British Colonial Office. He also helped found the Bank of the People in 1836. Although he signed a declaration of Toronto Reformers and joined a vigilance committee formed as a result in July 1837, Montgomery did not advocate open rebellion. In December, he was informed that his tavern would be the rebel base; Montgomery was to serve as commissary. John Linfoot, who had leased the tavern and would take possession in February 1838, had already moved in at the time and Montgomery was in the process of moving out. On December 7, on the orders of Francis Bond Head, the tavern was burned and Montgomery was arrested and charged with high treason. He was sentenced to be executed but his sentence was reduced and he was sent to Fort Henry to await exile to Tasmania. He escaped to Rochester, New York, where he became president of an association for Canadian refugees.

After receiving a pardon, Montgomery returned to Toronto in 1843. He rebuilt a new tavern on the site of the old one and continued to operate a number of taverns in Toronto. He also operated a hotel at the north-east corner of Church Street and Colborne Street for over three years after his return. Montgomery moved to Headford in then Markham Township in 1871 and served as postmaster there until 1876. In 1873, he received $3000 in compensation for the loss of his tavern. He acquired a home in Barrie in 1875, where he would move to in 1876 and died in there in 1879. Montgomery is buried in Union Cemetery in Barrie.

Now the location of a post office, the site of Montgomery's Tavern was designated a National Historic Site of Canada in 1925.
