= Chipman, New Brunswick =

Chipman
- Location within New Brunswick
- Coordinates: 46°10′16″N 65°53′02″W
- Country: Canada
- Province: New Brunswick
- County: Queens
- Parish: Chipman
- Municipality: Grand Lake
- Incorporated: 1966

Area
  - Land: 19.00 km^{2} (7.34 sq mi)

Population (2021)
  - Total: 1,201
  - Density: 63.2/km^{2} (164/sq mi)
  - Change 2016–21: ▲8.8%
- Time zone: UTC-4 (AST)
  - Summer (DST): UTC-3 (ADT)
- Website: Village of Chipman

Chipman is a community in Queens County, New Brunswick, Canada. It held village status prior to 2023 and is now part of the village of Grand Lake.

The community of Chipman is located on the banks of the Salmon River at the head of the Grand Lake, the largest freshwater lake in the Maritime provinces. The village itself is located around 73.4 kilometres from the capital city of Fredericton.

== History ==
Chipman is named after Ward Chipman Jr. (1787-1851), who served as Chief Justice of New Brunswick from 1834 to 1851. The village of Chipman was founded in 1835, and was made up of portions of the older parishes of Brunswick and Canning. The first settler in what would become the Parish of Chipman was Alexander McClure of County Tyrone, who arrived in 1820 with his wife, Mary McLeod and their five daughters. Earlier settlements upriver at Gaspereau, and downriver at the Range, existed prior to 1820, consisting of local settlers and Maine businessmen who established the first sawmills on the Salmon and Gaspereau Rivers. Immigration to the Chipman area escalated rapidly in the 1820s through the 1850s, with the large majority of new arrivals hailing from the northern counties of Ireland, in particular: Donegal, Londonderry, and Tyrone. The rapidly growing lumbering and sawmill industries were the primary impetus for this growth, which continued through most of the 19th century. The Parish of Chipman quickly became prominent because of its large population in comparison with the surrounding parishes, aided by the lure of employment from the burgeoning lumber mills, the coming of the railways, the development of the coal mining industry, and later in the 1930s, the establishment of L.E. Shaw's brick and tile plant. A large, modern sawmill currently provides many jobs for area residents.

The Grand Lake Coal Mining industry began in the 1630s when French settlers, called Acadians, learned about surface deposits of coal in the Coal Creek area now called Chipman, NB. The French used coal in their fort at the mouth of the Saint John river and in 1639 began selling coal to the British colony in the area now known as Boston, USA. This commercial trade in coal has been recognized as a National Historic Event and the First Export of Coal in America, by the Historic Sites and Monuments Board of Parks Canada.

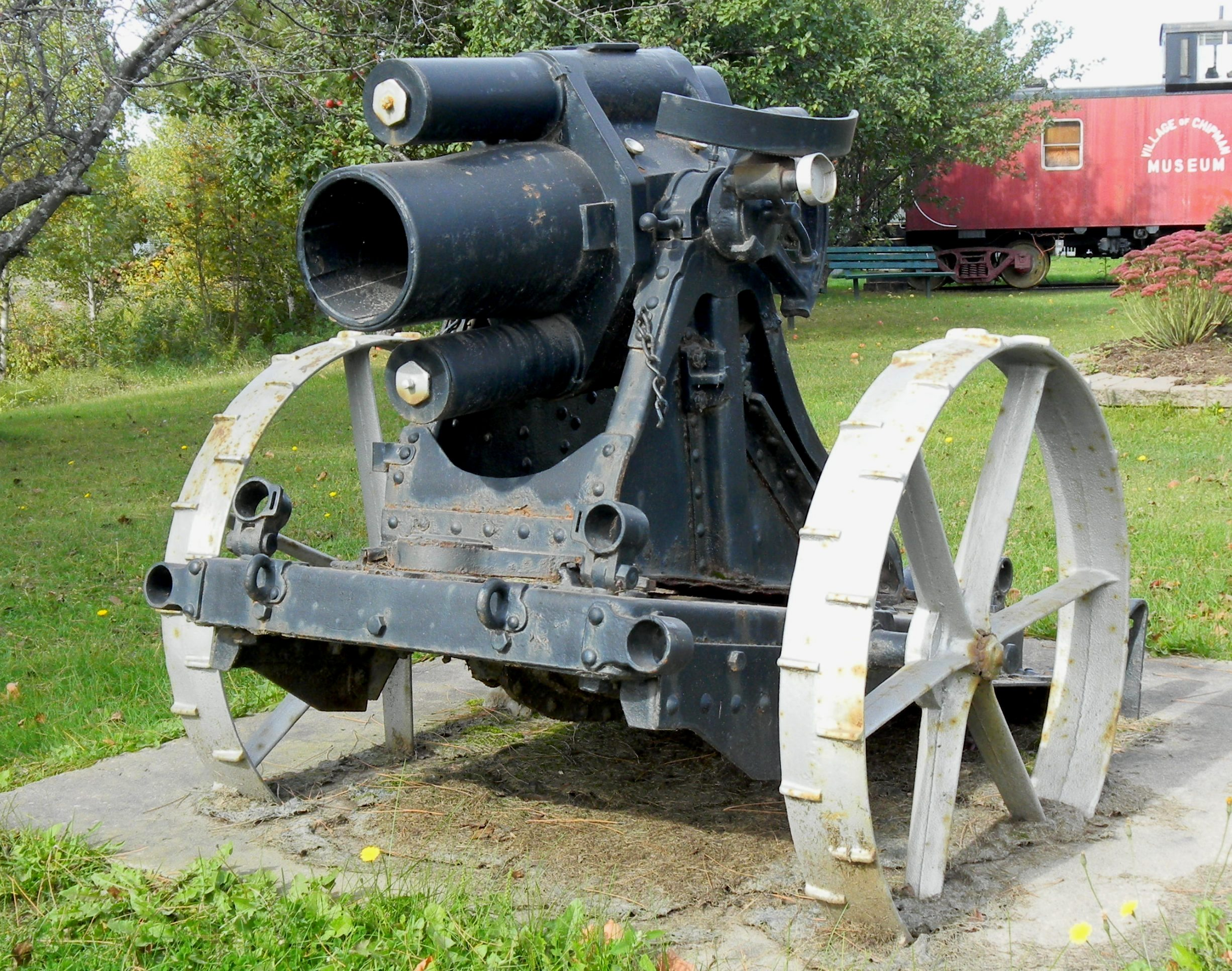
Captured German artillery gun (WWI) on display in Chipman

Despite its prosperity, economic growth in the late 19th and early 20th centuries was insufficient to provide employment for all the population at a time when families typically produced several children. As a consequence, Chipman experienced its own exodus of surplus labour force, particularly young men who had gained valuable experience in lumbering and milling. Chipman-area natives became pioneering founders of the embryonic sawmill industries in Montana, Washington state and California, as well as leading businessmen in other ventures in the new western U.S. territories and states.

In 2018, a controversy arose when a "straight pride" flag, designed by local resident Glenn Bishop, was raised in Chipman but removed the next day due to public outcry and criticism of its potential harm to the LGBTQ+ community. Bishop claimed the removal as discrimination against straight people.

On 1 January 2023, Chipman was amalgamated with the village of Minto and all or part of five local service districts to form the new village of Grand Lake. The community's name remains in official use.

== Demographics ==
In the 2021 Census of Population conducted by Statistics Canada, Chipman had a population of 1,201 living in 605 of its 647 total private dwellings, a change of 8.8% from its 2016 population of 1,104. With a land area of 19 km^{2} (7.3 sq mi), it had a population density of 63.2/km^{2} (163.7/sq mi) in 2021.

== Notable people ==
Elizabeth Brewster, CM SOM (26 August 1922 – 26 December 2012) was a poet, author, and academic.

== See also ==
- List of communities in New Brunswick
- List of counties of New Brunswick
