= Coles Island, New Brunswick =

Island in New Brunswick, Canada

Coordinates: 45.920647°N 65.789952°W

Location of Coles Island in New Brunswick

Coles Island is a settlement and an island in New Brunswick, Canada. The island itself is located in the Canaan River. The community is centred on Route 10, Route 715, and Route 112 intersection and extends south of the island as well. It links travellers on Route 10 - the former Trans-Canada Highway - to southern communities such as Sussex, New Brunswick, Apohaqui Saint John and the Fundy coastline.

It is known locally for its richness in small game hunting and fishing areas.

== History ==
The community is named after David Cole, a Loyalist settler in the area.

Its post office was established in 1858.

By 1898 Coles Island had a post office, two stores, a hotel, a sawmill, a church and a population of 100.

== See also ==
- List of communities in New Brunswick
