= Salmon River (New Brunswick) =

Coordinates: 46°5′58″N 65°55′30″W

Location
- Country: Canada
- Province: New Brunswick

Physical characteristics
- Mouth
  - location: Grand Lake

The Salmon River is a small river in central New Brunswick, Canada. It flows into Grand Lake near Chipman. It is part of the Saint John River watershed.

== See also ==
- List of rivers of New Brunswick
