= Waterborough Parish, New Brunswick =

Waterborough
- Parish
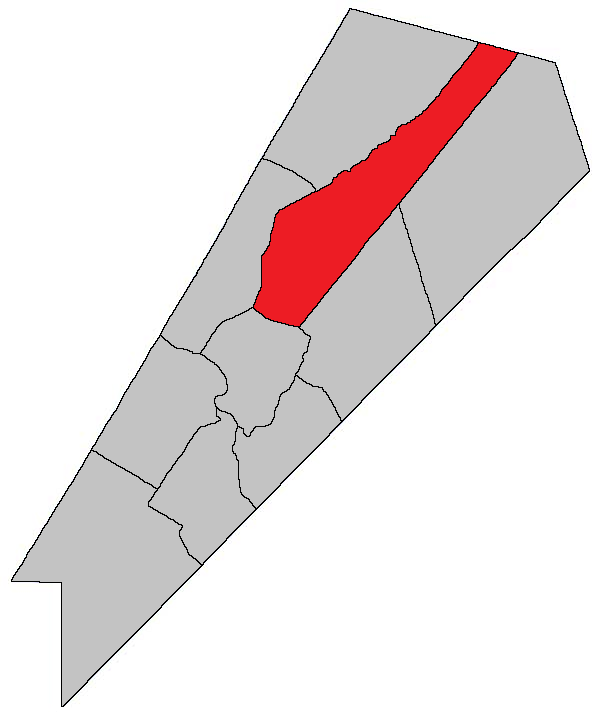
- Location within Queens County, New Brunswick.
- Coordinates: 45.84°N 64.59°W
- Country: Canada
- Province: New Brunswick
- County: Queens County
- Erected: 1786

Area
  - Land: 443.16 km^{2} (171.11 sq mi)

Population (2021)
  - Total: 903
  - Density: 2/km^{2} (5.2/sq mi)
  - Change 2016-2021: ▲6.6%
  - Dwellings: 661
- Time zone: UTC-4 (AST)
  - Summer (DST): UTC-3 (ADT)

Waterborough is a geographic parish in Queens County, New Brunswick, Canada.

Prior to the 2023 governance reform, for governance purposes it formed the local service district of the parish of Waterborough, which was a member of Capital Region Service Commission (RSC11).

== Origin of name ==
The parish was said locally to describe the terrain. The original boundaries surrounded Grand Lake.

== History ==
Waterborough was erected in 1786 as one of the county's original parishes. It completely surrounded Grand Lake and extended past the county line.

In 1827 Canning Parish was erected from Waterborough.

In 1852 part of Waterborough was included in the newly erected Cambridge Parish.

In 1855 Waterborough was expanded to the northwest, adding all of Chipman Parish southeast of Coal Creek.

In 1856 the boundary with Cambridge was adjusted.

In 1896 Waterborough was expanded northwest to reach the county line, taking part of Chipman.

== Boundaries ==
Waterborough Parish is bounded:

- on the northeast by the Kent County line;
- on the southeast by a line running north 54º east (Note: By the magnet of 1786, when declination at the starting point was a bit more than 14º west of north.) from a point on the Saint John River about 1.8 kilometres southwest of the Route 715 bridge over McAlpines Brook, which then strikes the Kent County line north of Lake Stream Lake;
- on the southwest by Fowler Road and Mill Cove;
- on the west by Grand Lake;
- on the northwest by a line running through the Northeast Arm of Grand Bay, then up Coal Creek past the mouth of the South Branch Coal Creek to the southeastern corner of a grant to Malcolm Carmichael at a stretch called the Round Turns, then northeasterly parallelling the southeastern line of the parish to the county line;
- including Goat Island in Grand Lake.

== Communities ==
Communities at least partly within the parish. bold indicates an incorporated municipality; italics indicate a name no longer in official use

- **Cambridge-Narrows**
- Cox Point
- Cumberland Bay
- Dixon
- Grant Settlement
- Mill Cove
- Pangburn
- Partridge Valley
- Pennlyn
- Rees
- The Range
- Union Settlement
- Waterborough
- Youngs Cove

== Bodies of water ==
Bodies of water (Note: Not including brooks, ponds or coves.) at least partly within the parish.

- Cumberland Bay Stream
- Coal Creek
- Youngs Creek
- Barton Lake
- Cameron Lake
- McLean Lake
- Grand Lake
  - Cumberland Bay
  - Northeast Arm

== Islands ==
Islands at least partly within the parish.

- Goat Island

== Other notable places ==
Parks, historic sites, and other noteworthy places at least partly within the parish.

- Partridge Valley West Protected Natural Area
- West Branch Coy Brook Protected Natural Area

== Demographics ==
Parish population total does not include portion within Cambridge-Narrows

=== Population ===
Population trend

Census	Population	Change (%)
2016	847	▼0.5%
2011	851	▼4.7%
2006	893	▼4.0%
2001	859	

=== Language ===
Mother tongue (2016)

Language	Population	Pct (%)
English only	805	95.8%
French only	20	2.4%
Both English and French	5	0.6%
Other languages	10	1.2%

== Access Routes ==
Highways and numbered routes that run through the parish, including external routes that start or finish at the parish limits:

- **Highways**
  - none
- **Principal Routes**
  - Route 2 (TCH)
  - Route 10
- Secondary Routes:
  - Route 105
- External Routes:
  - None

== See also ==
- List of parishes in New Brunswick
