= Grand Lake (New Brunswick) =

Lake in New Brunswick, Canada

- Location within New Brunswick
- Location: Queens County, New Brunswick
- Coordinates: 45°56′1.1″N 66°1′57.6″W
- Primary inflows: Salmon River
- Primary outflows: Jemseg River
- Basin countries: Canada
- Max. length: 33 km (21 mi)
- Max. width: 8 km (5.0 mi)
- Surface area: 42,172.4 acres (17,066.6 ha)
- Max. depth: 30.5 m (100 ft)

Grand Lake is a lake located in central New Brunswick, Canada. It is approximately 40 kilometers east of Fredericton. It is the province's largest open body of water and measures approximately 33 kilometres (21 mi) long and 8 kilometres (5.0 mi) wide. The lake drains through the Jemseg River and the Grand Lake Meadows into the Saint John River.

Records indicate that by the early 1600s Grand Lake was inhabited by Maliseet and Mi’kmaq peoples. The Wolastoqiyik word for Grand Lake is Kchee'quis and the Peskotomuhkati word is Kaouakousaki.

Commercial barges of forest products were towed across the lake from a large sawmill in Chipman to a pulp mill in Saint John until the late 1990s. Other commercial activities included New Brunswick's largest coal mining area with extensive strip mines in the Newcastle Creek valley. In the 1850s, significant amounts of 'Newcastle coal' was being shipped down river from Grand Lake to the Saint John River. This was a coal-fired power generating station that was built in 1931 and was torn down in 2012, it was formerly operated by NB Power, and is located on the lake shore near the village of Minto.

Today, the lake is popular for recreational activities for both locals and visitors, with several beaches, cottages, and campgrounds along its shores. This large body of water acts as a heat sink, moderating local temperatures and creating the warmest climate in the province which extends the growing season. There is a small aerodrome, Cumberland Bay Water Aerodrome, located in a bay of the same name on the east shore of the lake.

Communities along or near Grand Lake include:

- Wuhrs Beach
- Chipman
- Cumberland Bay
- Douglas Harbor
- Grand Lake West
- Jemseg
- Mill Cove
- Minto
- Princess Park
- Scotchtown
- Waterborough
- Whites Cove
- Wiggins Point
- Wuhrs Beach
- Youngs Cove

Campgrounds along or near Grand Lake include:

- Buckwheat Point Estates, Cumberland Bay, New Brunswick
- Grand Lake Campground, Newcastle Creek, New Brunswick
- Lakeside Campground, JC Mill Cove, New Brunswick
- Lake View Glamping, Cumberland Bay, New Brunswick
- Mohawk Camping, Youngs Cove, New Brunswick
- Princess Park Campground, Princess Park, New Brunswick
- Range Wharf Seasonal Campground, Arcadia, New Brunswick

Lakes and rivers which drain into Grand Lake include:

- Coal Creek
- Cumberland Bay Stream
- Newcastle Creek
- Maquapit Lake
- Salmon River

== See also ==
- List of lakes of New Brunswick
