= Whites Cove, New Brunswick =

Human settlement in New Brunswick, Canada

Coordinates: 45.868°N 66.062°W

Location of Whites Cove in New Brunswick

Whites Cove is a settlement in New Brunswick.

== See also ==
- List of communities in New Brunswick
