= Arcadia, New Brunswick =

Arcadia Cambridge-Narrows / Gagetown (formerly)
- Village
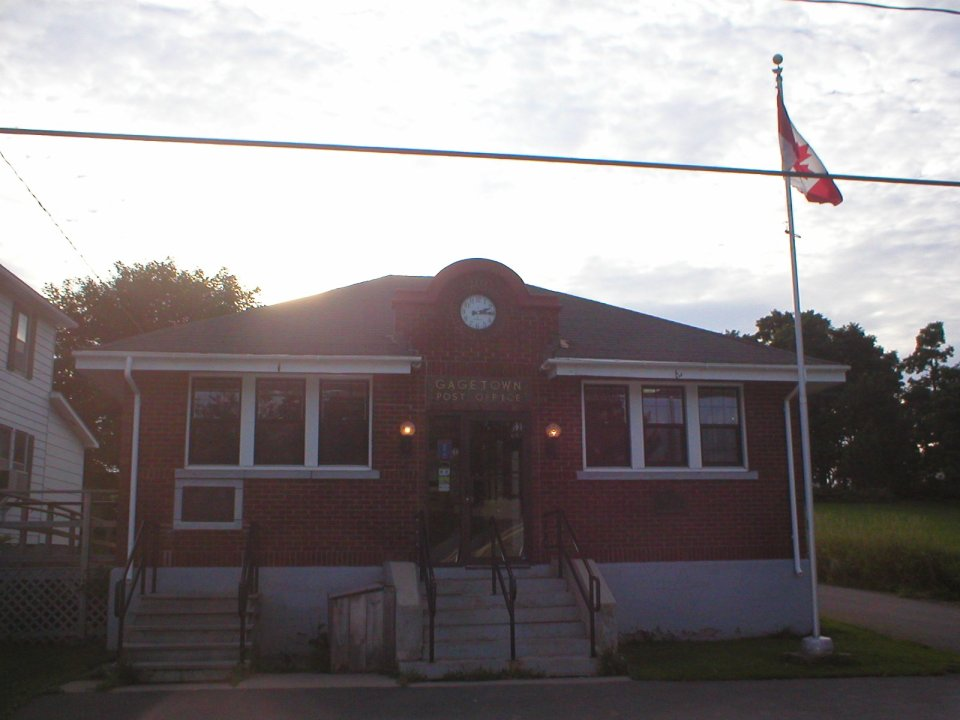
- Gagetown village post office

- Location within New Brunswick
- Coordinates: 45.79°N 66.07°W
- Country: Canada
- Province: New Brunswick
- County: Queens
- Regional service commission: Capital Region
- Incorporated: January 1, 2023

Government
  - Mayor: Robert M. Stoney
- Time zone: UTC-4 (AST)
  - Summer (DST): UTC-3 (ADT)
- Area code: 506
- Access Routes: Route 102

Arcadia is a village in the Canadian province of New Brunswick. It was formed through the 2023 New Brunswick local governance reforms.

== History ==
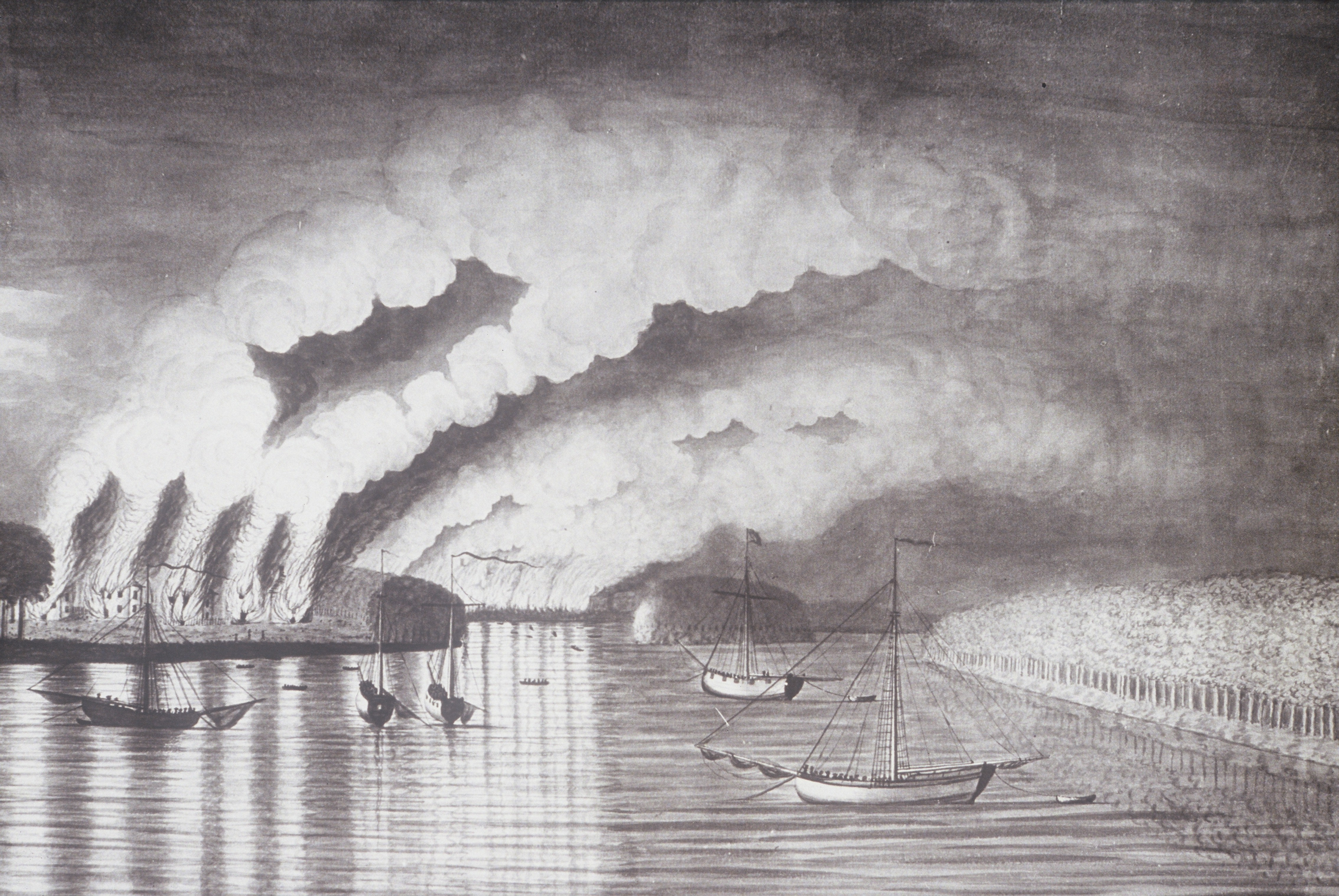
St. John River Campaign: A View of the Plundering and Burning of the City of Grimross (present day Arcadia, New Brunswick) by Thomas Davies in 1758. This is the only contemporaneous image of the Expulsion of the Acadians

Arcadia was incorporated on January 1, 2023, via the amalgamation of the former villages of Cambridge-Narrows and Gagetown as well as the concurrent annexation of adjacent unincorporated areas.

== Climate ==
Arcadia has a humid continental climate (Köppen Dfb) with warm summers, cold winters and plenty of precipitation year-round. Snowfall is frequent in winter.

Climate data for Arcadia, New Brunswick (1981–2010 normals)
Month	Jan	Feb	Mar	Apr	May	Jun	Jul	Aug	Sep	Oct	Nov	Dec	Year
Record high °C (°F)	14.5 (58.1)	19.5 (67.1)	21.7 (71.1)	28.5 (83.3)	34.5 (94.1)	34.5 (94.1)	36.1 (97.0)	37.2 (99.0)	33.3 (91.9)	28.3 (82.9)	21.1 (70.0)	16.0 (60.8)	37.4 (99.3)
Mean daily maximum °C (°F)	−4.1 (24.6)	−1.9 (28.6)	2.6 (36.7)	9.3 (48.7)	16.6 (61.9)	21.9 (71.4)	24.8 (76.6)	24.4 (75.9)	19.7 (67.5)	13.0 (55.4)	6.0 (42.8)	−0.4 (31.3)	11.0 (51.8)
Daily mean °C (°F)	−8.6 (16.5)	−6.6 (20.1)	−1.8 (28.8)	4.8 (40.6)	11.3 (52.3)	16.4 (61.5)	19.5 (67.1)	19.2 (66.6)	14.7 (58.5)	8.6 (47.5)	2.5 (36.5)	−4.4 (24.1)	6.3 (43.3)
Mean daily minimum °C (°F)	−13.0 (8.6)	−11.3 (11.7)	−6.1 (21.0)	0.2 (32.4)	5.8 (42.4)	10.8 (51.4)	14.2 (57.6)	13.9 (57.0)	9.7 (49.5)	4.2 (39.6)	−1.0 (30.2)	−8.2 (17.2)	1.6 (34.9)
Record low °C (°F)	−34.4 (−29.9)	−37.8 (−36.0)	−31.1 (−24.0)	−15.0 (5.0)	−5.0 (23.0)	−0.6 (30.9)	4.4 (39.9)	3.3 (37.9)	−3.9 (25.0)	−8.9 (16.0)	−20.6 (−5.1)	−33.3 (−27.9)	−37.8 (−36.0)
Average precipitation mm (inches)	104.6 (4.12)	77.3 (3.04)	100.7 (3.96)	89.4 (3.52)	105.8 (4.17)	86.1 (3.39)	96.9 (3.81)	86.5 (3.41)	86.1 (3.39)	105.7 (4.16)	101.8 (4.01)	98.4 (3.87)	1,139.2 (44.85)
Average snowfall cm (inches)	67.4 (26.5)	44.8 (17.6)	52.2 (20.6)	14.5 (5.7)	0.4 (0.2)	0.0 (0.0)	0.0 (0.0)	0.0 (0.0)	0.0 (0.0)	0.6 (0.2)	13.5 (5.3)	41.1 (16.2)	234.5 (92.3)
Average precipitation days	13.8	11.4	14.6	14.3	15.0	14.6	14.1	13.1	13.3	13.7	15.3	13.8	167.6
Source: Environment Canada

== Notable people ==
- John Montgomery was born in Gagetown. He owned the tavern (Montgomery's Tavern in Toronto, Ontario) which served as a base for the rebels during the Upper Canada Rebellion. His parents were loyalists who fled from New York following the American revolution.
- Annie Babbitt Bulyea (1863–1934) was born in Gagetown. She was a Canadian temperance leader.

== See also ==
- List of communities in New Brunswick
- List of municipalities in New Brunswick
