= Codys, New Brunswick =

Community in New Brunswick, Canada

Coordinates: 45.867°N 65.817°W

Codys is a community in Queens County, New Brunswick, named after the United Empire Loyalist Cody Family. The 2016 Canadian census found a population of 560.

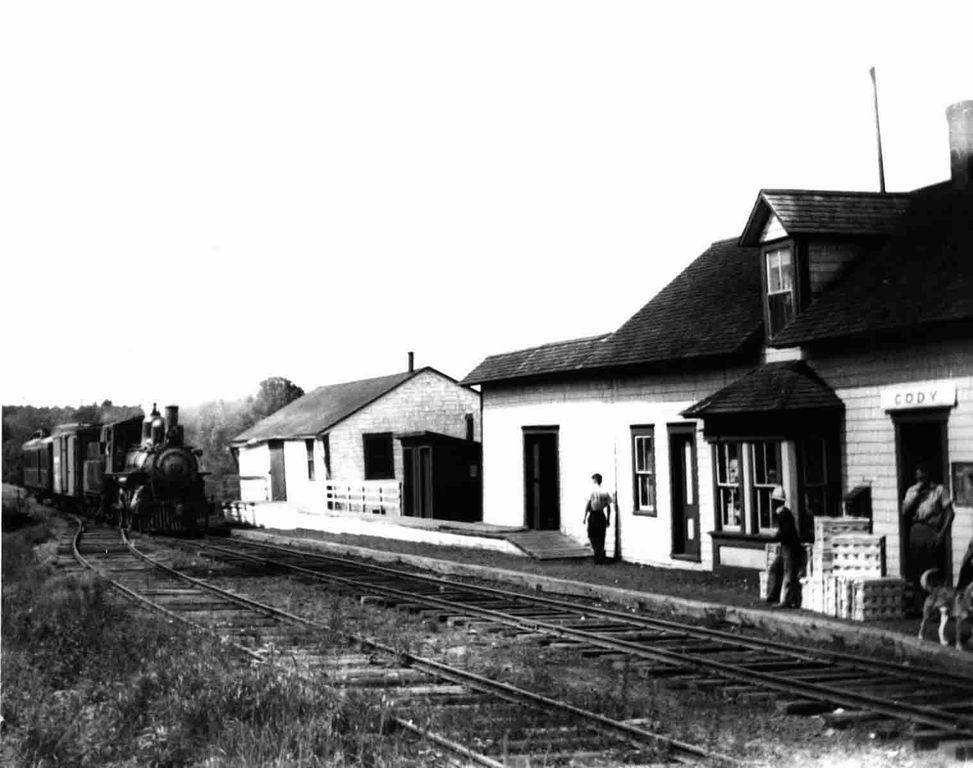
Railway station in Codys, c. 1930

== Notable people ==
- H. A. Cody, novelist
- Judson Hetherington, politician
- H. Aon Hetherington, politician
