= New Brunswick Route 10 =

Highway in New Brunswick, Canada

Route 10
- Route 10 highlighted in red

Route information
- Maintained by New Brunswick Department of Transportation
- Length: 144.2 km (89.6 mi)
- Existed: 1920s–present

Major junctions
- West end: Route 8 in Fredericton
- Route 116 near Chipman; Route 105 in Youngs Cove; Route 2 (TCH) in Youngs Cove
- East end: Route 1 in Sussex

Location
- Country: Canada
- Province: New Brunswick
- Major cities: Minto, Chipman

Highway system
- Provincial highways in New Brunswick; Former routes
← Route 8	→ Route 11

Route 10 is a 144 kilometre long highway starting in Fredericton and ending in Sussex, New Brunswick, Canada. The road goes northeast from the Fredericton suburb of Barker's Point to the village of Minto, then loops around Grand Lake through Chipman to Youngs Cove. Until 2001 this was the end of the highway, but with the opening of a new 4-lane section of the Trans-Canada Highway (Route 2), it now follows the old alignment of that highway from Youngs Cove to a junction with Route 1 in Sussex. While passing through Minto, Route 10 forms Pleasant Drive, and in Chipman, it forms parts of Bridge Street and Main Street.

== History ==
The original routing of Route 10 looped around Grand Lake from Sheffield through Minto, Chipman and Youngs Cove, then met the former main Fredericton-Moncton road (then known as Route 9) near Codys.

In the 1940s, a direct road was built from Minto to Fredericton, passing the site of the former World War II internment camp at Ripples. This road is now known as the "Richibucto Road". With upgrades to Route 9 later in the decade, Route 10 was shortened to end at Youngs Cove. There were no more major changes to Route 10 until 2001, when it was extended southeast from Youngs Cove to Sussex along the former Route 2 alignment.

== See also ==
- List of New Brunswick provincial highways
