= List of bridges in Canada =

This is a list of bridges and viaducts in Canada, including those for pedestrians and vehicular traffic.

== Historical and architectural interest bridges ==
There are only a few covered bridges left in Canada. In Quebec, despite over 1,200 existing in the last century, today there are only 88 remaining. In New Brunswick, 58 covered bridges have been identified.

	Name	Distinction	Length	Type	Carries Crosses	Opened	Location	Province	Ref.
1	Victoria Bridge	Longest bridge in the world when inaugurated Span : 100 m (330 ft)	2,009 m (6,591 ft)	Tubular; Wrought iron	Grand Trunk Railway; St. Lawrence River	1859	Montreal–Saint-Lambert; 45°29′30.4″N 73°31′44.1″W	Quebec	(Note: The Victoria Bridge has originally one railway track, it was modified into a truss bridge in 1901, in order to widen it and accommodate a second railway track, as well as a track for trams. Today it is a Railroad Bridge.)
2	Powerscourt Covered Bridge	Last McCallum truss type bridge in use. The oldest covered bridge still existing in Canada. National Historic Site; Historic monument	50 m (160 ft)	Covered bridge Wood, McCallum truss, masonry piers	Road bridge Chemin de la 1ère Concession; Châteauguay River	1862	Elgin – Hinchinbrooke; 45°00′25.2″N 74°09′39.7″W	Quebec	
3	West Montrose Covered Bridge	Only remaining covered bridge in Ontario; Cultural heritage	60 m (200 ft)	Covered bridge Wood and steel, Howe truss, concrete piers	Road bridge Covered Bridge Dr; Grand River (Ontario)	1881	West Montrose; 43°35′08.1″N 80°28′53.3″W	Ontario	
4	Stoney Creek Bridge (1885)	Highest timber bridge ever built Height : 84 m (276 ft)	138 m (453 ft)	Truss; Wooden Howe truss deck, wooden piers	Canadian Pacific Railway; Stoney Creek	1885	Golden; 51°22′46.6″N 117°27′57.2″W	British Columbia	
5	Frontière Bridge	Historic monument	31 m (102 ft)	Covered bridge Wood, Town truss	Former road bridge Chemin du Pont Couvert; Mud stream	1896	Potton; 45°00′42.5″N 72°22′24.4″W	Quebec	
6	Félix-Gabriel-Marchand Bridge	Historic monument	152 m (499 ft)	Covered bridge Wood, Town and queen post truss, wooden piers filled with stones	Road bridge Chemin du Pont-Rouge; Coulonge River	1898	Mansfield-et-Pontefract; 45°51′40.8″N 76°44′26.6″W	Quebec	
7	Hartland Covered Bridge	World's longest covered bridge National Historic Site; Historic monument	391 m (1,283 ft)	Covered bridge Wood, Howe truss, concrete piers	Road bridge Hartland Bridge Hill Road; Saint John River	1901	Hartland; 46°17′48.1″N 67°31′49.1″W	New Brunswick	
8	Capilano Suspension Bridge	Span : 137 m (449 ft); Height : 70 m (230 ft)	137 m (449 ft)	Suspension; Steel	Footbridge; Capilano River	1903	North Vancouver; 49°20′34.5″N 123°06′53.4″W	British Columbia	
9	Cap-Rouge trestle	Height : 52 m (171 ft)	1,016 m (3,333 ft)	Trestle bridge Steel	National Transcontinental Railway; Rivière du Cap Rouge	1908	Quebec City; 46°44′53.1″N 71°20′33.0″W	Quebec	
10	Lethbridge Viaduct	Largest railway structure in Canada and the largest of its type in the world Height : 96 m (315 ft)	1,625 m (5,331 ft)	Trestle bridge Steel	Railway bridge Oldman River	1909	Lethbridge; 49°41′51.3″N 112°52′06.1″W	Alberta	
11	Florenceville Bridge	Local Historic Place		Covered bridge Wood, Howe truss Sort	Road bridge Promenade Jim Davis; Saint John River	1911	Florenceville-Bristol; 46°26′30.0″N 67°37′16.2″W	New Brunswick	
12	Centre Street Bridge	Municipal Historic Resource	178 m (584 ft)	Arch; Concrete deck arch	Road bridge Centre Street (Calgary); Bow River	1916	Calgary; 51°03′10.6″N 114°03′45.1″W	Alberta	
13	Kinsol Trestle	One of the largest wooden trestle in Canada; Height : 44 m (144 ft)	187 m (614 ft)	Trestle bridge Wood, 46 spans, 8 levels, Howe truss	Former railway bridge Koksilah River	1920	Shawnigan Lake; 48°40′06.4″N 123°41′38.1″W	British Columbia	
14	Alexandra Suspension Bridge	Local Historic Place		Suspension; Steel truss deck, concrete pylons	Road bridge Fraser Canyon	1926	Spuzzum; 49°42′26.6″N 121°25′00.2″W	British Columbia	
15	Peace Bridge	Canada–United States border	1,768 m (5,801 ft)	Arch; Steel deck arch	Road bridge Queen Elizabeth Way; Niagara River	1927	Fort Erie–Buffalo; 42°54′24.9″N 78°54′19.0″W	Ontario; United States	
16	Routhierville Bridge	Historic monument Cultural Heritage Register	78 m (256 ft)	Covered bridge Wood, Quebec Town Truss	Road bridge Chemin du Rang A Matapedia River	1931	Routhierville; 48°10′56.4″N 67°8′55.9″W	Quebec	
17	Arvida Bridge	First bridge in the world built entirely of aluminum Span : 91 m (299 ft); Heritage monument	154 m (505 ft)	Arch; Aluminium deck arch	Road bridge Route du Pont; Saguenay River	1950	Arvida; 48°26′41.2″N 71°13′06.2″W	Quebec	
18	Montmorency Falls Suspension Bridge			Suspension; Steel	Footbridge; Montmorency Falls; Montmorency River	1993	Quebec City; 46°53′26.9″N 71°08′51.7″W	Quebec	
19	Esplanade Riel		197 m (646 ft)	Cable-stayed; Side-spar, concrete box girder deck, 1 steel pylon 86+106	Footbridge; Red River of the North	2003	Winnipeg; 49°53′26.9″N 97°07′36.6″W	Manitoba	

== Major road and railway bridges ==
Canada's longest bridge is the Confederation Bridge in the Gulf of St. Lawrence with a total of 12,910 metres (8.02 mi) between abutments, it's also the world's longest bridge over ice-covered water. More than 5,000 local workers helped with the project, which cost about $1 billion.

The Quebec Bridge has been the longest cantilever bridge span in the world since 1917, measuring 549 metres (1,801 ft) between its two piles. It held the record of all-categories longest span in the world until the opening of the Ambassador Bridge. It's the last bridge that broke such a record before suspension bridges hold the award by far. It was designated a National Historic Sites of Canada in 1995.

In 1929, the Ambassador Bridge between Canada and United States surpassed the Quebec Bridge with a 564-metre (1,850 ft) main span and became the longest crossing in the world until the inauguration of the George Washington Bridge in 1931 in New York City which almost doubled the range hitherto achieved.

Studies have been carried out for crossing the Saguenay River near Tadoussac just before the confluence with the St. Lawrence River, the latest project presented by COWI includes the construction of a 1,145-metre (3,757 ft) span suspension bridge with a 70-metre (230 ft) clearance above the river.

This table presents the structures with spans greater than 100 meters (non-exhaustive list).

	Name	Span	Length	Type	Carries Crosses	Opened	Location	Province	Ref.
1	Gordie Howe International Bridge	853 m (2,799 ft)	2,500 m (8,200 ft)	Cable-stayed; Steel box girder deck, concrete pylons	Ontario Highway 401; Detroit River	2026	Windsor–Detroit; 42°17′14.3″N 83°05′53.1″W	Ontario; United States	
2	Pierre Laporte Bridge	667 m (2,188 ft)	1,041 m (3,415 ft)	Suspension; Steel truss deck, steel pylons 186+667+186	Quebec Autoroute 73; St. Lawrence River	1970	Quebec City; 46°44′43.3″N 71°17′25.9″W	Quebec	(Note: The length given only takes into account the main bridge, central span(s) and shore span(s), approach viaducts are not counted.)
3	Ambassador Bridge	564 m (1,850 ft)	2,286 m (7,500 ft)	Suspension; Steel truss deck, steel pylons	Ontario Highway 3 Lake Erie Circle Tour; Detroit River	1929	Windsor–Detroit; 42°18′42.5″N 83°04′26.0″W	Ontario; United States	
4	Quebec Bridge	549 m (1,801 ft)	987 m (3,238 ft)	Cantilever; Steel truss 157+549+157	Quebec Route 175; Canadian National Railway; Via Rail; St. Lawrence River	1917	Quebec City–Lévis; 46°44′43.9″N 71°17′16.3″W	Quebec	
5	Lions Gate Bridge	473 m (1,552 ft)	1,517 m (4,977 ft)	Suspension; Steel truss deck, steel pylons 187+473+187	British Columbia Highway 99–1A; Burrard Inlet	1938	Vancouver; 49°18′55.1″N 123°08′19.5″W	British Columbia	
6	Port Mann Bridge (2012)	470 m (1,540 ft)	2,020 m (6,630 ft)	Cable-stayed; Composite steel/concrete deck, concrete pylons 190+470+190	British Columbia Highway 1 Trans-Canada Highway; Fraser River	2012	Surrey; 49°13′10.9″N 122°48′46.8″W	British Columbia	
7	Alex Fraser Bridge	465 m (1,526 ft)	2,524 m (8,281 ft)	Cable-stayed; Composite steel/concrete deck, concrete pylons 50+183+465+183+50	British Columbia Highway 91; Fraser River	1986	Delta; 49°09′35.2″N 122°56′34.8″W	British Columbia	
8	Angus L. Macdonald Bridge	441 m (1,447 ft)	1,347 m (4,419 ft)	Suspension; Steel truss deck, steel pylons 160+441+160	Road bridge Halifax Harbour	1955	Halifax, Nova Scotia; 44°39′48.7″N 63°35′05.6″W	Nova Scotia	
9	A. Murray MacKay Bridge	427 m (1,401 ft)	1,236 m (4,055 ft)	Suspension; Steel truss deck, steel pylons 156+427+156	Nova Scotia Highway 111; Halifax Harbour	1970	Halifax, Nova Scotia; 44°40′38.5″N 63°36′44.6″W	Nova Scotia	
10	Port Mann Bridge (1964) dismantled in 2012	366 m (1,201 ft)	2,093 m (6,867 ft)	Arch; Steel through arch 110+366+110	British Columbia Highway 1 Trans-Canada Highway; Fraser River	1964	Surrey; 49°13′06.0″N 122°48′41.7″W	British Columbia	
11	Ogdensburg–Prescott International Bridge	351 m (1,152 ft)	2,248 m (7,375 ft)	Suspension; Steel truss deck, steel pylons	Ontario Highway 16; St. Lawrence River	1960	Johnstown–Ogdensburg; 44°44′06.5″N 75°27′33.3″W	Ontario; United States	
12	SkyBridge	340 m (1,120 ft)	616 m (2,021 ft)	Cable-stayed; Concrete deck, concrete pylons	Vancouver SkyTrain (Expo Line); Fraser River	1990	Surrey–New Westminster; 49°12′19.4″N 122°53′46.9″W	British Columbia	
13	Ironworkers Memorial Second Narrows Crossing	335 m (1,099 ft)	1,292 m (4,239 ft)	Cantilever; Steel; 4x86+142+335+142	British Columbia Highway 1 Trans-Canada Highway; Burrard Inlet	1960	Vancouver–North Vancouver; 49°17′40.8″N 123°01′33.5″W	British Columbia	
14	Laviolette Bridge	335 m (1,099 ft)	2,707 m (8,881 ft)	Arch; Steel through arch 124+167+335+167 +2x124	Quebec Autoroute 55; St. Lawrence River	1967	Trois-Rivières; 46°18′25.9″N 72°33′41.8″W	Quebec	
15	Jacques Cartier Bridge	334 m (1,096 ft)	2,687 m (8,816 ft)	Cantilever; Steel; 128+334+128	Quebec Route 134; St. Lawrence River	1930	Montreal–Longueuil; 45°31′18.7″N 73°32′30.0″W	Quebec	
16	stal̕əw̓asəm Bridge	332 m (1,089 ft)	1,227 m (4,026 ft)	Cable-stayed; 1 concrete pylon 332+162+84	British Columbia Highway 99–1A; Fraser River	2025	Surrey–New Westminster; 49°12′29″N 122°53′33″W	British Columbia	
17	Île d'Orléans Bridge	323 m (1,060 ft)	1,838 m (6,030 ft)	Suspension; Steel truss deck, steel pylons 72+127+323+127+72	Quebec Route 368; St. Lawrence River	1936	Quebec City–Île d'Orléans; 46°52′46.3″N 71°08′03.0″W	Quebec	
18	Lewiston–Queenston Bridge	305 m (1,001 ft)	488 m (1,601 ft)	Arch; Steel deck arch	Ontario Highway 405; Niagara River	1962	Queenston–Lewiston; 43°09′11.2″N 79°02′40.5″W	Ontario; United States	
19	Grand-Mère Bridge	289 m (948 ft)	337 m (1,106 ft)	Suspension; Steel truss deck, steel pylons	Quebec Route 153; Saint-Maurice River	1929	Shawinigan; 46°37′11.6″N 72°40′35.7″W	Quebec	
20	Rainbow Bridge (Niagara Falls)	289 m (948 ft)	442 m (1,450 ft)	Arch; Steel deck arch	Road bridge Niagara River	1941	Niagara Falls–Niagara Falls, New York; 43°05′24.6″N 79°04′03.3″W	Ontario; United States	
21	Peace River Suspension Bridge collapse in 1957	283 m (928 ft)	640 m (2,100 ft)	Suspension; Steel truss, steel pylons 142+283+142	British Columbia Highway 97; Alaska Highway; Peace River	1943	Taylor; 56°08′15.2″N 120°40′21.5″W	British Columbia	
22	Second Blue Water Bridge	281 m (922 ft)	1,862 m (6,109 ft)	Arch; Steel through arch 85+281+85	Ontario Highway 402; St. Clair River	1997	Sarnia–Port Huron; 42°59′54.6″N 82°25′25.0″W	Ontario; United States	
23	Olivier-Charbonneau Bridge	280 m (920 ft)	1,200 m (3,900 ft)	Cable-stayed; Composite steel/concrete deck, concrete pylons 115+280+115	Quebec Autoroute 25; Rivière des Prairies	2011	Montreal–Laval; 45°38′19.7″N 73°37′17.0″W	Quebec	
24	Dunvegan Suspension Bridge	274 m (899 ft)		Suspension; Steel truss deck, steel pylons	Alberta Highway 2 Peace River	1960	Dunvegan; 55°55′16.5″N 118°36′16.0″W	Alberta	
25	Seaway International South Bridge	273 m (896 ft)	1,061 m (3,481 ft)	Suspension; Steel truss deck, steel pylons	Road bridge St. Lawrence River	1958	Cornwall–Massena; 44°59′21.9″N 74°44′23.3″W	Ontario; United States	
26	Blue Water Bridge	265 m (869 ft)	1,883 m (6,178 ft)	Cantilever; Steel truss 100+265+100	Ontario Highway 402; St. Clair River	1938	Sarnia–Port Huron; 42°59′56.0″N 82°25′24.8″W	Ontario; United States	
27	Alexandra Bridge (Trans-Canada)	257 m (843 ft)	487 m (1,598 ft)	Arch; Steel deck arch	British Columbia Highway 1 Trans-Canada Highway; Fraser River	1964	Spuzzum; 49°42′05.8″N 121°24′36.6″W	British Columbia	
28	Confederation Bridge	250 m (820 ft)(x43)	12,910 m (42,360 ft)	Box girder Prestressed concrete 165+43x250+165	New Brunswick Route 16; Prince Edward Island Route 1 Trans-Canada Highway; Northumberland Strait	1997	Borden-Carleton–Cape Jourimain; 46°12′17.5″N 63°45′30.9″W	Prince Edward Island; New Brunswick	
29	J. C. Van Horne Bridge	248 m (814 ft)	804 m (2,638 ft)	Cantilever; Steel truss	Road bridge Subway Street; Restigouche River	1961	Campbellton–Pointe-à-la-Croix; 48°00′39.5″N 66°40′50.1″W	New Brunswick; Quebec	
30	Golden Ears Bridge	242 m (794 ft)(x3)	968 m (3,176 ft)	Extradosed; Composite steel/concrete deck, 4 concrete pylons 121+3x242+121	Golden Ears Way; Fraser River	2009	Langley–Maple Ridge; 49°11′47.0″N 122°39′56.0″W	British Columbia	
31	Papineau-Leblanc Bridge	241 m (791 ft)	421 m (1,381 ft)	Cable-stayed; Steel box girder deck, steel pylons 90+241+90	Quebec Autoroute 19; Rivière des Prairies	1969	Montreal–Laval; 45°34′34.5″N 73°40′00.9″W	Quebec	
32	Champlain Bridge (2019)	240 m (790 ft)	3,335 m (10,942 ft)	Cable-stayed; Triple steel box girder deck, 1 concrete pylons 80+124+240	Quebec Autoroute 10; Quebec Autoroute 15; Quebec Autoroute 20; St. Lawrence River; St. Lawrence Seaway	2019	Montreal–Brossard; 45°28′06.3″N 73°30′20.6″W	Quebec	
33	Georgina Island Bridge	228 m (748 ft)	1,015 m (3,330 ft)	Suspension; Steel truss deck, steel pylons	Ontario Highway 137; St. Lawrence River	1938	Leeds and the Thousand Islands–Hill Island; 44°21′47.4″N 75°58′57.3″W	Ontario	
34	Longs Creek Bridge	218 m (715 ft)		Cable-stayed; Steel girder deck, steel pylons 58+218+58	Road bridge Saint John River	1966	Kingsclear; 45°52′05.7″N 66°55′02.6″W	New Brunswick	
35	Hawkshaw Bridge	217 m (712 ft)	333 m (1,093 ft)	Cable-stayed; Steel girder deck, steel pylons 58+217+58	New Brunswick Route 102; Saint John River	1967	Hawkshaw; 45°57′41.4″N 67°14′53.0″W	New Brunswick	
36	Champlain Bridge (1962) dismantled in 2019	215 m (705 ft)	3,440 m (11,290 ft)	Cantilever; Steel truss 117+215+117	Quebec Autoroute 10; Quebec Autoroute 15; Quebec Autoroute 20; St. Lawrence River; St. Lawrence Seaway	1962	Montreal–Brossard; 45°28′02.5″N 73°30′13.0″W	Quebec	
37	Pitt River Bridge	190 m (620 ft)	380 m (1,250 ft)	Cable-stayed; Composite steel/concrete deck, concrete pylons 95+190+95	British Columbia Highway 7 Pitt River	2009	Port Coquitlam–Pitt Meadows; 49°14′52.1″N 122°43′45.0″W	British Columbia	
38	Deh Cho Bridge	190 m (620 ft)	1,045 m (3,428 ft)	Extradosed; Composite steel/concrete truss deck, steel pylons 3x112+190+3x112	Yellowknife Highway; Mackenzie River	2012	Fort Providence; 61°15′52.6″N 117°31′32.0″W	Northwest Territories	
39	Revelstoke Bridge	183 m (600 ft)	302 m (991 ft)	Suspension; Steel truss deck, steel pylons	British Columbia Highway 1 Trans-Canada Highway; Columbia River	1961	Revelstoke; 51°00′22.9″N 118°13′12.7″W	British Columbia	
40	Burton Bridge	183 m (600 ft)	544 m (1,785 ft)	Arch; Steel through arch 65+183+65	Road bridge Saint John River	1972	Maugerville–Burton; 45°51′53.1″N 66°27′05.0″W	New Brunswick	
41	Pont des Piles	181 m (594 ft)	285 m (935 ft)	Box girder Prestressed concrete 39+181+39	Quebec Autoroute 55; Saint-Maurice River	1978	Shawinigan; 46°38′06.9″N 72°41′00.1″W	Quebec	
42	North Arm Bridge	180 m (590 ft)	562 m (1,844 ft)	Extradosed; Concrete box girder deck, concrete pylons 52+139+180+139+52	Vancouver SkyTrain (Canada Line); Fraser River (North Arm)	2008	Vancouver–Richmond; 49°12′07.6″N 123°07′04.0″W	British Columbia	
43	Reversing Falls Bridge	172 m (564 ft)		Arch; Steel deck arch	New Brunswick Route 100; Saint John River (Reversing Falls)	1916	Saint John; 45°15′34.3″N 66°05′12.4″W	New Brunswick	
44	Alexandra Bridge	169 m (554 ft)	563 m (1,847 ft)	Cantilever; Steel truss 75+169+2x75	Road bridge Boulevard des Allumettières; Ottawa River	1901	Ottawa–Gatineau; 45°25′48.7″N 75°42′15.8″W	Ontario; Quebec	
45	Whirlpool Rapids Bridge	167 m (548 ft)	329 m (1,079 ft)	Arch; Steel deck arch	Maple Leaf (train); Niagara River	1897	Niagara Falls–Niagara Falls, New York; 43°06′33.7″N 79°03′29.5″W	Ontario; United States	
46	Pont de la Concorde	160 m (520 ft)(x3)	690 m (2,260 ft)	Box girder Steel; 104+3x160+104	Road bridge Avenue Pierre Dupuy; St. Lawrence River	1965	Montreal; 45°30′22.1″N 73°32′20.3″W	Quebec	
47	Miscou Bridge	160 m (520 ft)	505 m (1,657 ft)	Beam bridge Steel; 60+110+160+110+65	New Brunswick Route 113; Chaleur Bay	1996	Miscou Island–Lamèque Island; 47°53′12.7″N 64°34′40″W	New Brunswick	
48	Seal Island Bridge	152 m (499 ft)	747 m (2,451 ft)	Arch; Steel through arch 107+152+107	Nova Scotia Highway 105; Trans-Canada Highway; Bras d'Or Lake	1962	Boularderie Island–Cape Breton Island; 46°13′58.6″N 60°29′24.7″W	Nova Scotia	
49	Burlington Bay James N. Allan Skyway (1958)	151 m (495 ft)	2,560 m (8,400 ft)	Arch; Steel through arch 84+151+84	Queen Elizabeth Way; Hamilton Harbour	1958	Hamilton–Burlington; 43°17′53.7″N 79°47′49.1″W	Ontario	
50	Burlington Bay James N. Allan Skyway (1985)	151 m (495 ft)	2,215 m (7,267 ft)	Box girder Prestressed concrete	Queen Elizabeth Way; Hamilton Harbour	1985	Hamilton–Burlington; 43°17′53.4″N 79°47′50.0″W	Ontario	
51	Sault Ste. Marie International Bridge	132 m (433 ft)	4.5 km (2.8 mi)	Truss arch bridge Steel	Road bridge St. Marys River	1962	Sault Ste. Marie; 46°30′25.31″N 84°21′40.75″W	Ontario; United States	
52	Saint John Harbour Bridge			Beam bridge Steel	New Brunswick Route 1 Saint John River (Saint John Harbour)	1968	Saint John; 45°16′09.7″N 66°04′29.5″W	New Brunswick	
53	Centennial Bridge		1,180 m (3,870 ft)	Arch; Steel through arch	New Brunswick Route 8, 11 and 134; Miramichi River	1967	Miramichi; 47°01′37.8″N 65°28′44.4″W	New Brunswick	

== The old bridges over the Niagara ==
This part lists all the former bridges which succeeded one another on the Niagara River between the towns of Niagara Falls, Ontario, and Queenston in Canada and Niagara Falls, New York, and Lewiston, in United States. The Whirlpool Rapids Bridge (1897), the Rainbow Bridge (1941) and the Lewiston–Queenston Bridge (1962), still in service are listed in the Major road and railway bridges part above.

	Name	Span	Length	Type	Note	Opened	Location	Ref.
1	First Niagara Falls Suspension Bridge dismantled in 1855	232 m (761 ft)		Suspension; Wooden pylons	First crossing of the Niagara; Conception by Charles Ellet Jr. Replaced by the second Niagara Falls Suspension Bridge	1848	Niagara Falls, Ontario– Niagara Falls, New York; 43°06′33.2″N 79°03′29.4″W	
2	First Lewiston–Queenston Bridge wrecked by wind in 1864	257 m (843 ft)	317 m (1,040 ft)	Suspension		1854	Queenston–Lewiston; 43°09′42″N 79°02′47″W	
3	Second Niagara Falls Suspension Bridge dismantled in 1897	251 m (823 ft)		Suspension with cable-stays, 2 levels wooden deck, masonry pylons	World's first working railway suspension bridge Conception by John A. Roebling; Replaced by the Whirlpool Rapids Bridge	1855	Niagara Falls, Ontario– Niagara Falls, New York; 43°06′33.3″N 79°03′29.5″W	(Note: The bridge's span has been given lengths that ranged from 800 to 825 ft by various sources. This article takes the length stated by McCullough.)
4	First Niagara Clifton Bridge destroyed by storm in 1889	386 m (1,266 ft)		Suspension with cable-stays, wooden deck and pylons	Longest span in the world when inaugurated Conception by Samuel Keefer	1868	Niagara Falls, Ontario– Niagara Falls, New York; 43°05′18.2″N 79°04′11.3″W	(Note: The covering of the towers was carried out in 1872, in 1884, the wooden towers were replaced with steel, finally all the wooden components were replaced with steel in 1888 and the deck was widened. The bridge can then have very different appearances depending on the year.)
5	Niagara Cantilever Bridge dismantled in 1925	151 m (495 ft)	276 m (906 ft)	Cantilever	Replaced by the Michigan Central Railway Bridge	1883	Niagara Falls, Ontario– Niagara Falls, New York; 43°06′30.2″N 79°03′28.4″W	
6	Honeymoon Bridge destroyed by ice push in 1938	256 m (840 ft)	378 m (1,240 ft)	Arch; Steel deck arch	Longest span arch bridge in the world when inaugurated	1898	Niagara Falls, Ontario– Niagara Falls, New York; 43°05′18.0″N 79°04′10.5″W	
7	Second Lewiston–Queenston Bridge dismantled in 1963	257 m (843 ft)	257 m (843 ft)	Suspension	Former Second Niagara Clifton Bridge moved	1899	Queenston–Lewiston; 43°09′42″N 79°02′46″W	
8	Michigan Central Railway Bridge; Out of service since 2001	195 m (640 ft)		Arch; Steel deck arch		1925	Niagara Falls, Ontario– Niagara Falls, New York; 43°06′31.4″N 79°03′28.9″W	

== Alphabetical list ==
This part is organized by province and territory.

=== Alberta ===
- 170 Street Pedestrian Bridge - Edmonton
- Athabasca River Bridge - Fort McMurray
- Beverly Bridge − Edmonton
- Briggs Bridge – Briggs
- Capilano Bridge − Edmonton
- Centre Street Bridge − Calgary
- Clover Bar Bridge − Edmonton
- Dawson Bridge − Edmonton
- Dudley B. Menzies Bridge − Edmonton
- Dunvegan Suspension Bridge − Dunvegan
- Edward's Way Bridge - Airdrie
- Fabyan Trestle Bridge − Fabyan
- Grant MacEwan Bridge − Fort McMurray
- George C. King Bridge − Calgary
- Groat Bridge − Edmonton
- High Level Bridge − Edmonton
- James MacDonald Bridge − Edmonton
- Reconciliation Bridge − Calgary
- Lea Park Bridge - Lea Park
- Lethbridge Viaduct − Lethbridge
- Louise Bridge − Calgary
- Low Level Bridge − Edmonton
- Mintlaw Viaduct − Mintlaw
- Peace Bridge − Calgary
- Quesnell Bridge − Edmonton
- Ralph Steinhauer Bridge − Fort McMurray
- Red Deer Canadian Pacific Railway Bridge − Red Deer
- Star Mine Suspension Bridge − Drumheller
- Tawatinâ Bridge – Edmonton
- Walterdale Bridge − Edmonton

=== British Columbia ===
- Agassiz-Rosedale Bridge − Agassiz
- Alex Fraser Bridge − Richmond/New Westminster - North Delta
- Arthur Laing Bridge − Vancouver - YVR, Richmond
- Burrard Street Bridge − Vancouver
- Cambie Street Bridge − Vancouver
- Capilano Suspension Bridge − North Vancouver
- Derwent Way Bridge − Delta - New Westminster
- Dinsmore Bridge − Richmond
- Dollarton Bridge − North Vancouver
- Eleanor Ward Bridge − Coquitlam
- Fraser Valley Railroad Bridge − New Westminster - Surrey
- Georgia Viaduct − Vancouver
- Golden Ears Bridge − Langley - Maple Ridge - Pitt Meadows - Surrey
- Granville Street Bridge − Vancouver
- Hagwilget Canyon Bridge − Hagwilget
- Hudson's Hope Suspension Bridge − Hudson's Hope
- Ironworkers Memorial Second Narrows Crossing − Vancouver - North Vancouver
- Johnson Street Bridge - Victoria
- Knight Street Bridge − Vancouver - Richmond
- Lions' Gate Bridge − Vancouver - West Vancouver
- Lynn Canyon Suspension Bridge − North Vancouver
- Lulu Island CN Rail Bridge − Burnaby - Richmond
- Marpole Bridge (road) − Vancouver - Richmond
- Marpole CP Rail Bridge − Vancouver - Richmond
- McPhee Bridge − Cranbrook
- Middle Arm Canada Line Bridge − Richmond
- Mission Bridge − Abbotsford
- Moray Bridge − Richmond
- New Westminster Bridge − New Westminster - Surrey
- No. 2 Road Bridge − Richmond
- North Arm Canada Line Bridge − Vancouver - Richmond
- Oak Street Bridge − Vancouver - Richmond
- Overlanders Bridge − Kamloops
- Park Bridge − East of Golden, British Columbia
- Peace River Bridge
- Pitt River Bridge − Port Coquitlam - Pitt Meadows
- Port Mann Bridge − Coquitlam - Surrey
- Prince George CNR Bridge − Prince George
- Queensborough Bridge − New Westminster
- stal̕əw̓asəm Bridge − New Westminster - Surrey
- Ronyane Bridge − Pemberton
- Sea Island Connector − Richmond
- Second Narrows Bridge − Vancouver - North Vancouver
- SkyBridge − New Westminster - Surrey
- Water Avenue Bridge (Bill Hartley Fraser-Hope Bridge) − Hope
- Westham Island Bridge − Ladner
- William R. Bennett Bridge - Kelowna
- The Yukon Suspension Bridge - Northern British Columbia

=== Manitoba ===
- Arlington Bridge − Winnipeg
- Assiniboine River Bridge - Portage la Prairie
- Esplanade Riel − Winnipeg
- The Bridges of St Norbert - St Norbert
- Provencher Bridge − Winnipeg
- Elm Park Bridge − Winnipeg
- St. Vital Bridge − Winnipeg
- Norwood Bridge − Winnipeg
- Main Street Bridge − Winnipeg
- Midtown Bridge (Donald Street Bridge) − Winnipeg
- Osborne Bridge − Winnipeg
- Harry Lazarenko Bridge (Redwood Bridge) − Winnipeg
- Fort Garry Bridge − Winnipeg
- Kildonan Settlers Bridge − Winnipeg
- Kichi Sipi Bridge - Cross Lake
- Maryland Bridge − Winnipeg
- Charleswood Bridge − Winnipeg
- Disraeli Bridge − Winnipeg
- Louise Bridge − Winnipeg
- Slaw Rebchuk Bridge (Salter Street Bridge) − Winnipeg
- North Perimeter Bridge − Winnipeg
- Selkirk Lift Bridge - Selkirk
- South Perimeter Bridge − Winnipeg
- St Peters Dynevor Bridge
- West Perimeter Bridge − Winnipeg
- St. James Bridge − Winnipeg
- Lockport Bridge − Lockport
- Daly Overpass (18th Street Bridge) − Brandon
- 8th Street Bridge − Brandon
- 1st Street Bridge − Brandon
- Thompson Bridge − Brandon
- Bruce Cameron Bridge − Swan River
- Taylor Bridge − Headingley
- Pierre Delorme Bridge − St. Adolphe
- Miles Hart Bridge - Thompson
- Baie St Paul Bridge
- Jack Bend Bridge

=== Newfoundland and Labrador ===
- Sir Robert Bond Bridge
- Queen Elizabeth II Bridge − St. John's
- Sir Ambrose Shea Bridge − Placentia

=== New Brunswick ===
- Burton Bridge − Burton - Maugerville
- Confederation Bridge − Cape Jourimain, NB - Borden, PEI
- Centennial Bridge − Miramichi
- Edmundston-Madawaska Bridge − Edmundston to Madawaska, Maine
- Florenceville Bridge − Florenceville
- Fredericton Railway Bridge − Fredericton - South Devon
- Gunningsville Bridge − Moncton - Riverview
- Hartland Bridge − Hartland
- Hawkshaw Bridge − Nackawic-Millville
- Hugh John Flemming Bridge − Hartland
- J. C. Van Horne Bridge − Campbellton - Pointe-à-la-Croix, QC
- Jemseg River Bridge − Jemseg
- Kelly's Creek Bridge − Upper Kingsclear
- Mactaquac Bridge − Mactaquac
- Miramichi Bridge − Miramichi
- Morrissy Bridge − Miramichi
- Nerepis Bridge − Grand Bay-Westfield
- Point Wolfe Bridge – Fundy National Park
- Princess Margaret Bridge − Fredericton
- Reversing Falls Bridge − Saint John
- Reversing Falls Railway Bridge − Saint John
- Saint John Harbour Bridge − Saint John
- Saint John River High Level Crossing − Coystown
- Westmorland Bridge − Fredericton

=== Northwest Territories ===
- Deh Cho Bridge − Fort Providence

=== Nova Scotia ===
- Barra Strait Bridge − Barra Strait, Cape Breton Island
- Grand Narrows Bridge − Barra Strait, Cape Breton Island
- A. Murray MacKay Bridge − Halifax
- Angus L. Macdonald Bridge − Halifax
- Seal Island Bridge − Boularderie Island - Cape Breton Island
- Canso Canal swing bridge − Port Hastings
- George Street Bridge − New Glasgow

=== Ontario ===
- Alexandra Bridge − Ottawa, ON – Gatineau, QC
- Ambassador Bridge − Windsor – Detroit, MI
- Blackfriars Street Bridge − London
- Blue Water Bridge − Point Edward – Port Huron, MI
- Burgoyne Bridge – St. Catharines
- Champlain Bridge − Ottawa – Gatineau, QC
- Chaudière Bridge − Ottawa, ON - Gatineau, QC
- Gordie Howe International Bridge − Windsor – Detroit, MI
- Garden City Skyway − St. Catharines
- Heron Road Bridge − Ottawa, ON
- Hogg's Hollow Bridge − Toronto
- James N. Allan Skyway Bridge (Burlington Bay Skyway) − Hamilton – Burlington
- La Salle Causeway − Kingston
- Leaside Bridge − Toronto
- Little Current Swing Bridge − Little Current – Turner
- Long-Sault Bridge − Hawkesbury, Ontario – Grenville, Quebec
- Nipigon River Bridge − Nipigon
- Ogdensburg–Prescott International Bridge − Prescott – Ogdensburg, NY
- Peace Bridge − Fort Erie – Buffalo, NY
- Portage Bridge − Ottawa - Gatineau
- Prince Edward Viaduct (Bloor Street Viaduct) − Toronto
- Macdonald-Cartier Bridge − Ottawa – Gatineau, QC
- Queenston-Lewiston Bridge − Queenston - Lewiston, NY
- Rainbow Bridge − Niagara Falls – Niagara Falls, NY
- Sault Ste. Marie International Bridge − Sault Ste. Marie – Sault Ste. Marie, MI
- Sgt. Aubrey Cosens VC Memorial Bridge − Latchford
- Sioux Narrows Bridge - Sioux Narrows
- Temagami Bridge – Timmins
- Thousand Islands Bridge − near Ivy Lea – near Fishers Landing, NY
- Waaban Crossing - Kingston
- Whirlpool Rapids Bridge − Niagara Falls – Niagara Falls, NY

=== Prince Edward Island ===
- Confederation Bridge − Borden - Cape Jourimain, NB
- Hillsborough River Bridge − Charlottetown - Stratford

=== Quebec ===
- Ahuntsic Bridge − Laval - Montreal
- Alexandra Bridge − Gatineau - Ottawa, ON
- Arthur Sauve Bridge − Laval - Saint-Eustache
- Arvida Bridge - Jonquière, Québec
- Athanase David Bridge − Laval - Bois-des-Filions
- Alonzo Wright Bridge − Gatineau - Chelsea
- Bordeaux Railway Bridge − Montreal - Laval
- Bordeleau bridge − Saint-Séverin (Mékinac) - Mékinac - Mauricie
- Brady Bridge − Gatineau
- Champlain Bridge − Gatineau - Ottawa, ON
- Champlain Bridge − Montreal - Brossard
- Charles de Gaulle Bridge − Montreal - Charlemagne
- Chaudière Bridge − Gatineau - Ottawa, ON
- Coaticook Canyon Bridge - Coaticook
- Draveurs Bridge − Gatineau
- Galipeault Bridge − Montreal - L'Île-Perrot
- Gedeon Ouimet Bridge − Laval - Boisbriand
- Honore Mercier Bridge − Montreal - Kahnawake
- Île aux Tourtes Bridge − Montreal - Vaudreuil-Dorion
- Île d'Orléans Bridge − Quebec City - Île d'Orléans
- Jacques Cartier Bridge − Montreal - Longueuil
- J. C. Van Horne Bridge − Pointe-à-la-Croix - Campbellton, NB
- Lachapelle Bridge − Laval - Montreal
- Lady Aberdeen Bridge − Gatineau
- Laurier Railway Bridge − Montreal - Repentigny -Charlemagne
- Laviolette Bridge − Trois-Rivières - Bécancour
- Le Gardeur Bridge − Montreal - Repentigny
- Lepage Bridge − Laval - Terrebonne
- Long-Sault Bridge − Grenville, Quebec – Hawkesbury, Ontario
- Louis Bisson Bridge − Laval - Montreal
- Louis-Hippolyte Lafontaine Bridge-Tunnel − Montreal - Boucherville
- Macdonald-Cartier Bridge - Hull - Ottawa, ON
- Marius Dufresne Bridge − Laval - Rosemère
- Matthieu Bridge − Laval - Terrebonne
- Médéric Martin Bridge − Laval - Montreal
- Olivier-Charbonneau Bridge − Laval - Montreal
- Papineau-Leblanc Bridge − Laval - Montreal
- Percy Covered Bridge (Powerscourt) − Elgin - Hinchinbrooke
- Pie IX Bridge − Laval - Montreal
- Pierre Laporte Bridge − Quebec City - Lévis
- Portage Bridge − Gatineau - Ottawa, ON
- Quebec Bridge − Quebec City - Lévis
- Saint-Laurent Railway Bridge − Montreal - Kahnawake
- Sophie Masson Bridge − Laval - Terrebonne
- Vachon Bridge − Laval - Boisbriand
- Victoria Bridge − Montreal - Saint-Lambert

=== Saskatchewan ===
North Saskatchewan River

- Battlefords Bridge — Battleford – North Battleford
- Battleford Bridge (1908) — Battleford – North Battleford
- Canadian Northern Railway Bridge — Prince Albert
- Diefenbaker Bridge — Prince Albert
- Maymont Bridge — Mayfield No. 406
- Borden Bridge — Borden
- Petrofka Bridge — Blaine Lake No. 434

South Saskatchewan River

- Broadway Bridge — Saskatoon
- Chief Mistawasis Bridge — Saskatoon
- Circle Drive Bridge — Saskatoon
- Gordie Howe Bridge — Saskatoon
- CPR Bridge — Saskatoon
- Grand Trunk Bridge — Saskatoon
- Outlook Bridge — Outlook
- Spadina Crescent Bridge — Saskatoon — note: Bridge over run-off trench leading into the South Saskatchewan River
- Senator Sid Buckwold Bridge — Saskatoon
- Traffic Bridge — Saskatoon
- University Bridge — Saskatoon
- Muskoday Bridge — Muskoday First Nation
- St. Louis Bridge — St. Louis
- St. Louis Bridge (1915) — St. Louis
- Skytrail — Outlook

Saskatchewan River

- Crooked Bridge — Nipawin
- George Willis Bridge — Wapiti Valley Regional Park

Other lakes and rivers

- Albert Memorial Bridge — Regina
- Cochin Bridge — Cochin
- Long Creek Bridge — Estevan No. 5
- Sherwood Forest Bridge — Grand Coulee

== Notes and references ==
- Notes
- "Canadian Register of Historic Places". Historicplaces.ca.
- "Répertoire du patrimoine culturel du Québec" [Quebec Cultural Heritage Directory]. Patrimoine-culturel.gouv.qc.ca (in French).
- Nicolas Janberg. "International Database for Civil and Structural Engineering". Structurae.com.
- Others references

== See also ==
- Transport in Canada
- Roads in Canada
- Numbered highways in Canada
- Rail transport in Canada
- Geography of Canada
- List of rivers of Canada
- List of covered bridges in Quebec
- List of covered bridges in New Brunswick
- List of bridges by city: Calgary, Island of Montreal, Ottawa, Toronto
- List of bridges by river: Fraser River, Nechako River, Niagara River, North Saskatchewan River, Ottawa River, Red Deer River, Richelieu River, Rivière des Mille Îles, Rivière des Prairies, St. Lawrence River and the Great Lakes, South Saskatchewan River, Thompson River
