= Longest bridge =

Longest bridge may refer to:

- List of longest bridges
- List of longest suspension bridge spans
- List of longest cable-stayed bridge spans
- List of longest cantilever bridge spans
- List of longest arch bridge spans
- List of longest continuous truss bridge spans
- List of longest masonry arch bridge spans

== See also ==
- List of longest tunnels
