= Centennial Bridge (New Brunswick) =

Bridge in Miramichi, New Brunswick, Canada

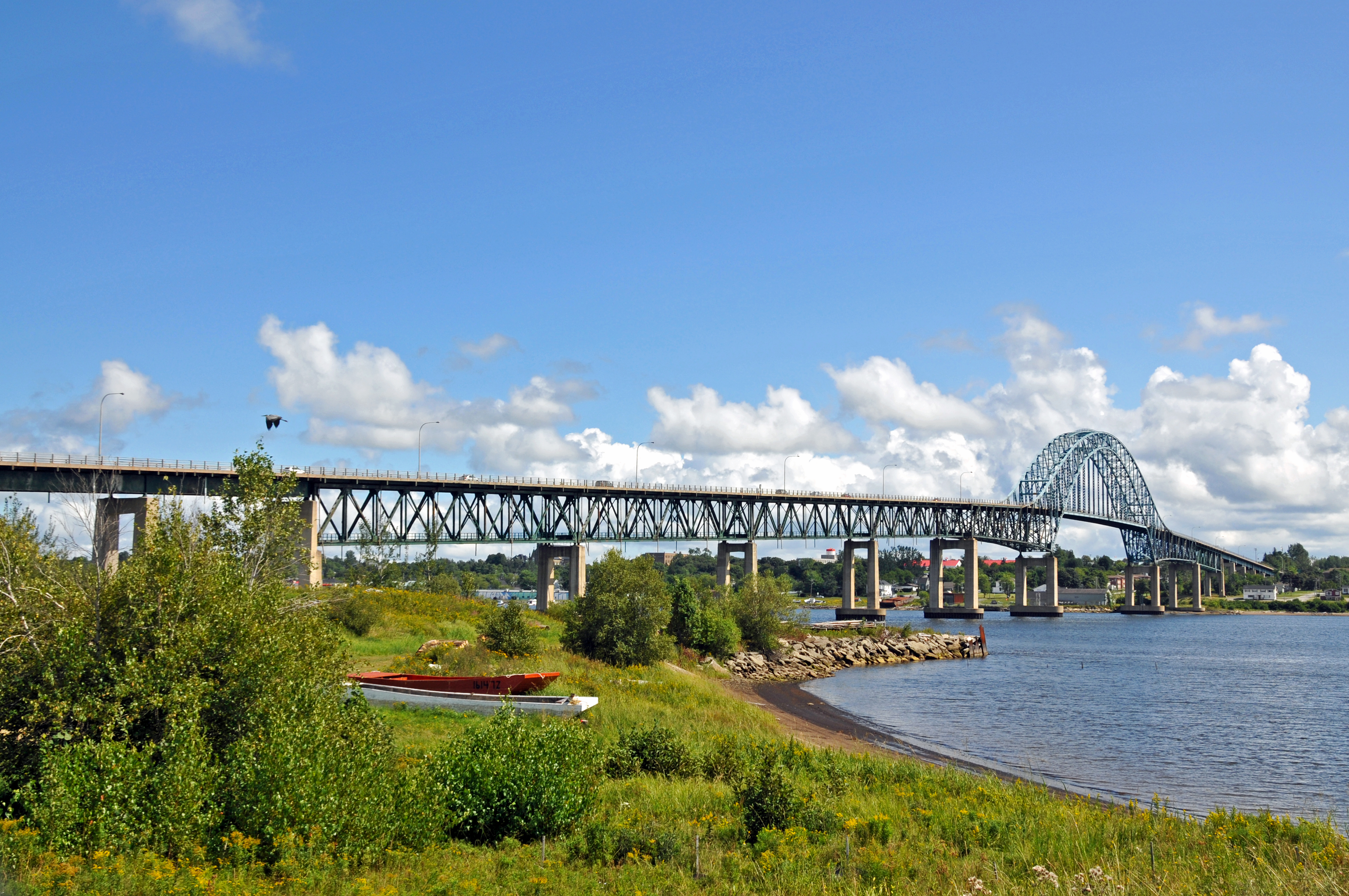
- The Centennial Bridge as seen from north of the Miramichi River.
- Coordinates: 47°01′44″N 65°28′52″W
- Crosses: Miramichi River
- Locale: Miramichi, New Brunswick

Characteristics
- Design: Steel Through Arch
- Total length: 1180 metres (3872 feet)
- Width: two Lanes, two Sidewalks
- Height: 73 metres (240 feet)

History
- Opened: September 30, 1967

Statistics
- Daily traffic: 14,800 (2012)

Location
- Interactive map of Centennial Bridge

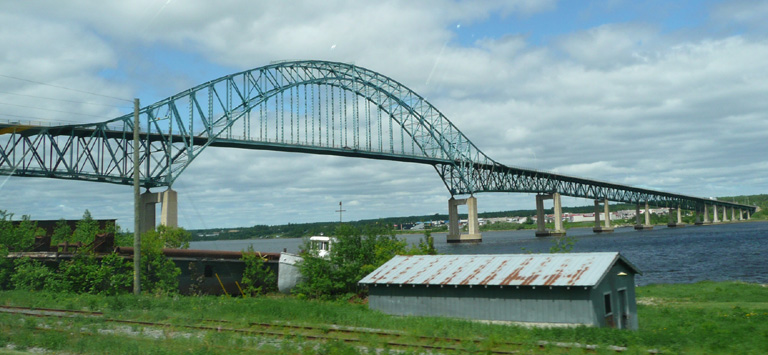
Centennial Bridge

Centennial Bridge is a steel through arch crossing the Miramichi River in Northumberland County, New Brunswick, Canada. The bridge is 1.1 km long, and 240 feet high. It carries Route 11, Route 8, and Route 134 over the river, connecting Douglastown on the north bank with Chatham on the south bank; both communities were merged with others in the vicinity through municipal amalgamation into the city of Miramichi. Another nearby crossing is the Miramichi Bridge.

The bridge was opened in 1967, Canada's centennial year. It replaced a ferry service (Romeo & Juliet) which operated between downtown Chatham and Ferry Road. Upon the bridge's opening, Romeo & Juliet was moved to service a new route across Kennebecasis Bay between Summerville and Millidgeville near Saint John.

Bridges of similar construction in eastern Canada include the Seal Island Bridge, the Burton Bridge, and the Laviolette Bridge over the St. Lawrence River in Trois-Rivières.

== See also ==
- List of bridges in Canada
