= Lea Park Bridge =

Bridge in Lea Park, Alberta, Canada

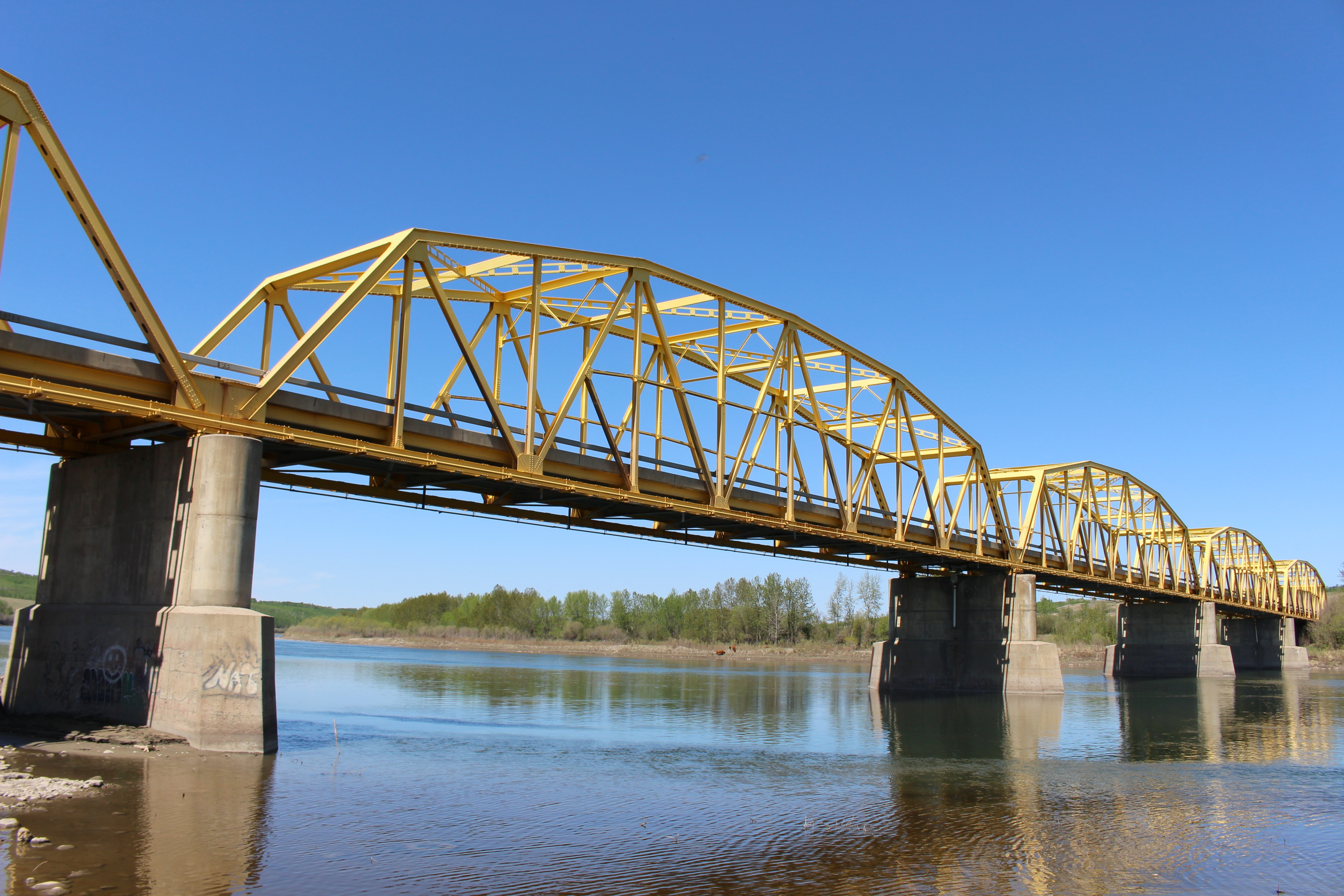
- View of the Lea Park Bridge in 2015
- Coordinates: 53.660389°N 110.336762°W
- Carries: 2 lanes of Alberta Highway 897
- Crosses: North Saskatchewan River
- Locale: Alberta
- Maintained by: Alberta Transportation

Characteristics
- Design: Truss bridge
- Material: Steel, concrete
- Total length: 1,010 feet (310 m)
- Width: 24 feet (7.3 m)
- Piers in water: 4

History
- Designer: L. H. McManus (Chief Bridge Engineer)
- Construction start: May 1956
- Construction end: October 1957
- Opened: June 1958

Statistics
- Daily traffic: 1,500 (2023)

Lea Park Bridge is a truss bridge that crosses the North Saskatchewan River as part of Alberta Highway 897 in the County of Vermilion River near the community of Lea Park, Alberta. It is located approximately 21 kilometres (13 mi) from the Saskatchewan border between Marwayne and the Cree community of Frog Lake. The bridge is situated directly to the left of the mouth of the Vermilion River.

== Design ==
The bridge is made of 938 short tons (851 metric tons) of steel and 3,400 cubic yards (2,600 m^{3}) of concrete. The design features five yellow trusses over a two lane road with a steel railing and concrete curb. Underneath the bridge there are five concrete piers and two concrete abutments.

== History ==
The current location of the Lea Park Bridge had long been used as a crossing point by early settlers due to its narrowness. Prior to the bridge being built the area was served by a ferry which was installed in 1908, which was originally just a scow, but was then updated to a cable ferry and finally adapted into a motor-powered ferry. By 1956 the total vehicle traffic on the ferry had grown to 22,287 vehicles; this along with the fact that the ferry closed during the spring and fall made the need for a bridge apparent to both locals and what was then known as the Alberta Department of Highways. Construction for the bridge started in May 1956 as a collaboration between the Department of Highways and Manczasz Construction. The construction involved the use of a crane and a cable car to transport materials. The opening ceremony of the bridge took place in 1958 and involved a parade featuring a marching band, cars used as parade floats and Mounties on horseback. By its completion, the bridge ended up costing $800,000 (upwards of $8,000,000 in today's money). Both the steel railing and the concrete curbs were replaced in 2011 and repairs on the bridge were done in 2013 and 2018. Over the years, the bridge has been the location of multiple accidents and a car chase.

== See also ==
- List of bridges in Canada
