= Yukon Suspension Bridge =

Pedestrian cable suspension bridge in British Columbia, Canada

Coordinates: 59.772624°N 134.920034°W

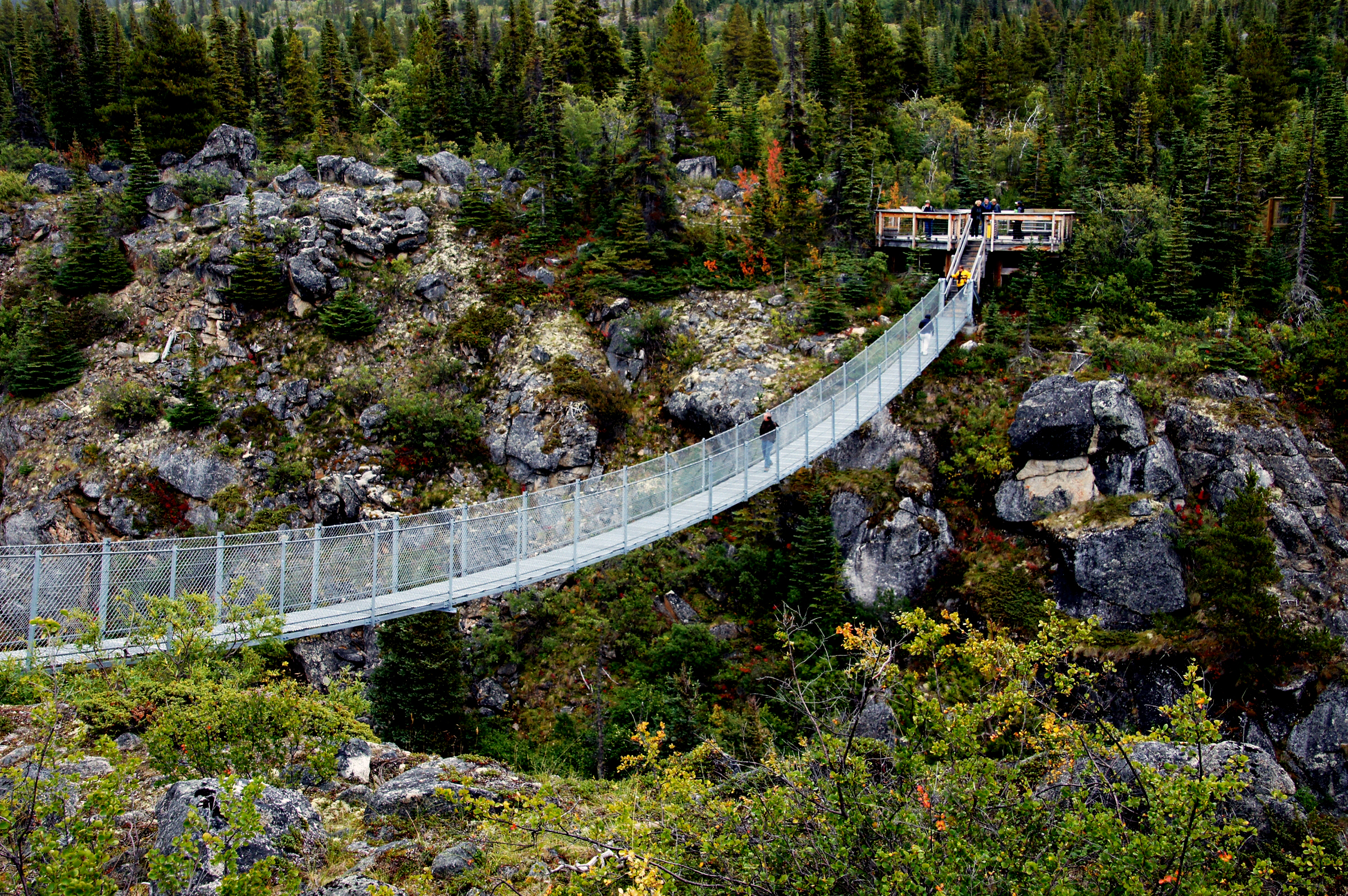
Crossing The Yukon Suspension Bridge

The Yukon Suspension Bridge is a pedestrian cable suspension bridge located on mile 46.5 on the South Klondike Highway in Northern British Columbia, Canada. It is 200 ft (60.96 metres) long and stretches 57 ft (17.36 metres) over the Tutshi River Canyon. There is an admission charge, and it is visited by over 25,000 people every summer between the months of May and September.

== History ==
The Yukon Suspension Bridge was completed in 2006 by Surespan Construction Group. The bridge's initial estimated cost for construction was one million Canadian dollars but due to the remote location and limitations on building supplies upon completion costs grew to three million Canadian dollars. In 2011 the bridge was privately acquired and now is locally owned and operated.

== Construction and design ==
Due to the Yukon Suspension Bridge's isolated location there were challenges in the construction. The bridge was erected using galvanized steel cables, and required a helicopter to install the far side towers before it could be suspended over the river. This costly method was the only way to get the cables across because the other side of the canyon was completely inaccessible. Design of the interpretive areas and main building are done entirely in wood, since concrete is not available in these remote conditions where temperatures during winter reach -38°C (-36.4°F).

== See also ==
- List of bridges in Canada

== Notes ==
Error in link. Should be https://www.contemporist.com/the-yukon-suspension-bridge-by-scott-m-kemp-architect/
