= Miramichi Bridge =

Coordinates: 46°59′30″N 65°33′28″W

The Miramichi Bridge is a concrete bridge crossing the Miramichi River in Miramichi, New Brunswick, Canada.

The bridge carries two lanes of highway traffic between Newcastle on the west bank and Chatham Head on the east bank. It opened to traffic in 1995 as part of the Route 117 / Chatham bypass project, and is located approximately 1 km (0.62 mi) upstream from the much older Morrissy Bridge, which closed to trucks in 1995 and fully in September 2008. Locals call the Miramichi Bridge the "new" bridge. It is not to be confused with the Centennial Bridge, located further downstream between Chatham and Douglastown, both now parts of the City of Miramichi.

== See also ==
- List of bridges in Canada
