= List of longest cantilever bridge spans =

This list of cantilever bridges ranks the world's cantilever bridges by the length of their main span. A cantilever bridge is a bridge built using cantilevers: structures that project horizontally into space, supported on only one end.

== Completed cantilever bridges ==
This list only includes bridges that carry automobiles or trains. It does not include suspension bridges, cable-stayed bridges, footbridges or pipeline bridges. The span must be 720 feet (220 m) or over to be included in the list.

Note: Click on each bridge's rank to go to the bridge's website. The list may be incomplete. Sourced additions are welcomed.

	Rank	Name	Main span in meters (feet)	Completed	Location
	1	Pont de Québec (longest from 1917 to present)	549 (1,800)	1917	Quebec City and Lévis, Canada
	2	Forth Bridge (longest from 1890 to 1917)	521 (1,710) x2	1890	South Queensferry, City of Edinburgh to North Queensferry, Fife, Scotland, United Kingdom
	3	Minato Bridge	510 (1,673)	1973	Osaka, Japan
	4	Commodore Barry Bridge	501 (1,644)	1974	Chester, Pennsylvania, to Bridgeport, New Jersey, United States
	5	Crescent City Connection	480 (1,575)	1958 (eastbound); 1988 (westbound)	New Orleans, Louisiana, United States
	6	Sanguantang Bridge	465 (1,526)	2020	Ningbo, Zhejiang, China
	7	Howrah Bridge	457 (1,500)	1943	Kolkata, West Bengal, India
	8	Veterans Memorial Bridge	445 (1,460)	1995	Gramercy, Louisiana, United States
	9	Tokyo Gate Bridge	440 (1,443)	2012	Tokyo, Japan
	10	San Francisco–Oakland Bay Bridge (east Bay span)	427 (1,400)	1936 (demolished 2016)	San Francisco, California, United States
	11	J. C. Van Horne Bridge	380 (1,247)	1961	Campbellton, New Brunswick, to Pointe-à-la-Croix, Quebec, Canada
	12	Astoria–Megler Bridge	376 (1,232)	1966	Astoria, Oregon, to Point Ellice near Megler, Washington, United States
	13	Horace Wilkinson Bridge	376 (1,235)	1968	Baton Rouge, Louisiana, United States
	14	Tappan Zee Bridge	369 (1,212)	1955 (demolished 2019)	Nyack, New York, United States
	15	Lewis and Clark Bridge	366 (1,200)	1930	Longview, Washington, United States
	16	Queensboro Bridge	360 (1,182)	1909	New York, New York, United States
	17	Carquinez Bridge (parallel spans)	335 (1,100) x2	1927 (southbound; demolished 2007); 1958 (northbound)	Vallejo, California, United States
	18	Ironworkers Memorial Second Narrows Crossing	335 (1,100)	1960	Vancouver, British Columbia, Canada
	19	El Ferdan Railway Bridge	335 (1,100)	2001	near Ismailia, Egypt
	20	Jacques Cartier Bridge	334 (1,096)	1930	Montreal, Quebec, Canada
	21	Shibanpo Yangtze River Bridge	330 (1,080)	2006	Chongqing, China
	22	Richmond-San Rafael Bridge	326 (1,070) x2	1956	Richmond, California, United States
	23	John P. Grace Memorial Bridge	320 (1,050)	1929 (demolished in 2006)	Charleston, South Carolina, United States
	24	Newburgh-Beacon Bridge	305 (1,000)	1963 (westbound); 1981 (eastbound)	Newburgh, New York, United States
	25	Stolma Bridge	301 (988)	1998	Austevoll, Norway
	26	Raftsund Bridge	298 (978)	1998	Vesterålen, Norway
	27	Sundøy Bridge	298 (978)	2003	Nordland, Norway
Martin Luther King, Jr. Bridge	28	Martin Luther King Bridge	294 (964)	1950	St. Louis, Missouri, United States
	29	Story Bridge	282 (924)	1940	Brisbane, Queensland, Australia
	30	Bras de la Plaine Bridge	280.77 (921)	2002	Réunion, France
	31	Caruthersville Bridge	280 (919)	1975	Caruthersville, Missouri, United States
	32	Silver Memorial Bridge	274 (900)	1969	Henderson, West Virginia, United States
	33	Ravenswood Bridge	274 (900)	1981	Ravenswood, West Virginia to Meigs County, Ohio, United States
	34	Carpenter Bridge	274 (900)	1987	St. Marys, West Virginia, United States
	35	Carl Perkins Bridge	274 (900)	1987	Portsmouth, Ohio, United States
	36	Blue Water Bridge	265 (871)	1938	Port Huron, Michigan, United States to Sarnia, Ontario, Canada
	37	Vicksburg Bridge	263 (870)	1973	Vicksburg, Mississippi, United States
Before demolition	38	Sunshine Skyway Bridge	263 (864)	1954 (original span); 1969 (second span); Demolished 1993; replaced with cable-stayed bridge	Tampa Bay, Florida, United States
	39	Foresthill Bridge	263 (862)	1972	Foresthill, California, United States
	40	Branko's Bridge	261 (856)	1957	Belgrade, Serbia
	41	Gateway Bridge	260 (853)	1986	Brisbane, Queensland, Australia
	42	New Varodd Bridge	260 (853)	1993	Kristiansand, Agder, Norway
	43	Huey P. Long Bridge	258 (848) x2	1940	Baton Rouge, Louisiana, United States
	44	Natchez-Vidalia Bridge	258 (846) x2	1940 (westbound); 1988 (eastbound)	Natchez, Mississippi, United States
	45	Brownville Bridge	257 (840)	1939	Brownville, Nebraska, United States
	46	Benjamin G. Humphreys Bridge	257 (840)	1940 (demolished 2011)	Greenville, Mississippi, United States
	47	Brent Spence Bridge	253 (830)	1963	Covington, Kentucky, United States
	48	Old Vicksburg Bridge	251 (825)	1930	Vicksburg, Mississippi, United States
	49	Sunshine Bridge	251 (825)	1964	St. James Parish, Louisiana, United States
	50	George Rogers Clark Memorial Bridge	250 (820) x2	1929	Louisville, Kentucky, United States
	51	Skye Bridge	250 (820)	1995	Skye, Scotland, United Kingdom
	52	Confederation Bridge	250 (820) x43	1997	Borden-Carleton, Prince Edward Island, to Cape Jourimain, New Brunswick, Canada
	53	Matthews Bridge	246 (810)	1953	Jacksonville, Florida, United States
	54	Helena Bridge	245 (804)	1961	Helena, Arkansas, United States
	55	Tobin Bridge	244 (800)	1950	Boston, Massachusetts (Charlestown-Chelsea, MA, United States
	56	Cairo Ohio River Bridge	240 (800) x2	1937	Wickliffe, Kentucky and Cairo, Illinois, United States
	57	Hamana Bridge	240 (800)	1976	Shizuoka Prefecture, Japan
	58	Huey P. Long Bridge	238 (790)	1935 (widened 2013)	Jefferson Parish, Louisiana, United States
	59	Silas N. Pearman Bridge	230 (760)	1966 (demolished 2006)	Charleston, SC, United States
	60	Outerbridge Crossing	229 (750)	1928	Perth Amboy, New Jersey, and southwestern Staten Island, New York City, New York, United States
	61	Bi-State_Vietnam_Gold_Star_Bridges	220 (720)	1932 (Northbound) and 1965 (Southbound)	Ohio River at Henderson County, Kentucky

== See also ==
- List of cantilever bridges
- List of spans
