= BDI Bridge =

Bridge in Winnipeg, Manitoba

Elm Park Bridge
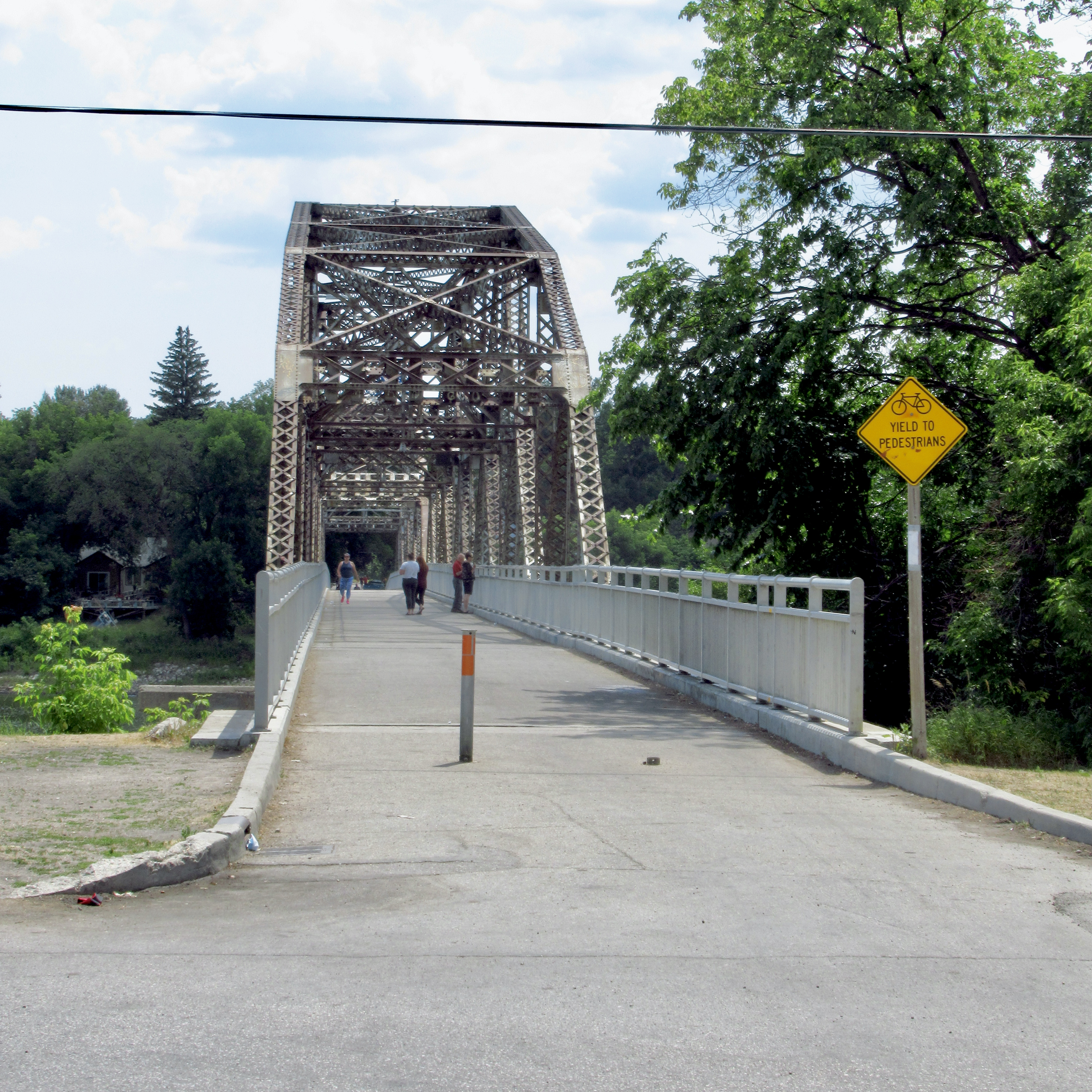
- The bridge viewed from its north end in 2021
- Coordinates: 49.8543°N 97.1420°W
- Carries: Pedestrians; bicycles
- Crosses: Red River
- Locale: Fort Rouge–St. Vital
- Other name: BDI Bridge
- Named for: Elm Park (former park)
- Preceded by: St. Vital Bridge
- Followed by: Fort Garry Bridge

Characteristics
- Design: Truss
- Material: Steel
- Total length: 521 feet (159 m)
- Width: 16 feet (4.9 m)
- No. of spans: 1

History
- Contracted lead designer: E. E. Brydone-Jack
- Constructed by: Elm Park Bridge Company
- Construction start: 1912
- Construction cost: CA$125,000
- Opened: 24 May 1914
- Replaces: Pontoon bridge

Location
- Interactive map of Elm Park Bridge

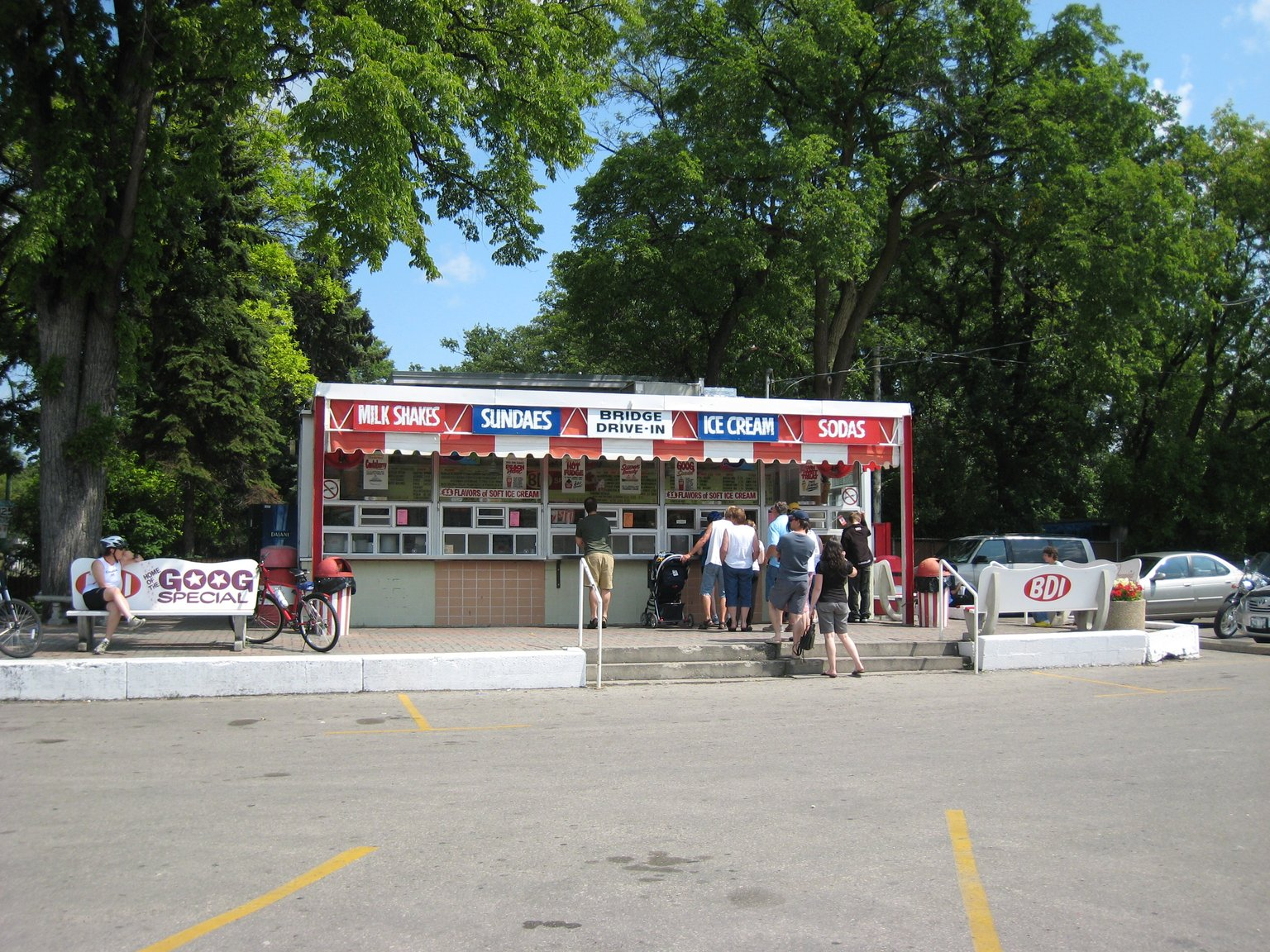
Bridge Drive-In ice cream shop adjacent to the bridge, from which the bridge's nickname, BDI Bridge, is derived

The Elm Park Bridge, sometimes locally called the BDI Bridge or the Ice Cream Bridge, is a steel truss bridge over the Red River in Winnipeg, Manitoba.

It links Kingston Crescent in the neighbourhood of St. Vital with Jubilee Avenue in Fort Rouge. Built in 1912 and opened in 1914, it is the fourth-oldest bridge in Winnipeg after the Redwood, Louise, and Arlington. The bridge has a deck measuring 16 feet (4.9 m) wide; though initially open to two-way vehicular traffic, it was closed to vehicles in 1974, remaining accessible to only pedestrians and cyclists ever since.

The nickname "BDI Bridge" is derived from the popular ice cream vendor Bridge Drive-In (BDI), that sits adjacent to the bridge. In turn, BDI itself is so-named because of its proximity to the Elm Park Bridge.

== History ==
Elm Park (now Kingston Crescent and Kingston Row), the former trolley park beside which the bridge was built, was created in 1890 by the Elm Park Company, whose parent company, Winnipeg Street Railway Co., wanted to attract passengers onto their new streetcar line, which ran down Osborne Street to Jubilee. At this time, a seasonal pontoon bridge allowed people access from Jubilee Avenue to the park’s entrance in what was then the Rural Municipality of St. Vital. In 1912, Winnipeg Street Railway figured that a better idea for their business would be to subdivide the park's land for residential development.

This development included replacing the pontoon bridge with a toll bridge; Roland Fairbairn McWilliams, owner of Elm Park, had tried on numerous occasions to have the City of Winnipeg pay for the construction of a better bridge across the Red River between Jubilee and St. Vital. A full-page ad in the Winnipeg Free Press in May 1912 had a diagram showing the new bridge with the park street-car line loop ending on the Jubilee side of the Red River and advertising "[f]ive minute [street]car service to the city."

The Elm Park Bridge Company built the bridge between 1912 and 1913 at a cost of CA$125,000, for which the implementation of a toll was meant to offset. The then Rural Municipality of St. Vital council meeting in December 1912 passed a motion saying they wanted the bridge moved, preferring it closer to Pembina Street (now Osborne Street). The City of Winnipeg "opened" the section of Jubilee so that the streetcar could terminate at the new Elm Park Bridge.

The bridge was opened on 24 May 1914 and was accessible to two-way vehicular traffic, despite its deck being only 16 feet (4.9 m) wide. It also included a sidewalk on its east side. The toll was 5 cents for pedestrians, 10 cents for cars, and 25 cents for trucks. Until the nearby St. Vital Bridge was built at Osborne Street in 1965, Elm Park Bridge was one of just three ways Winnipeg motorists could cross into St. Vital.

With the bridge in poor condition, the Elm Park Company decided to close it indefinitely in August 1945. This allowed the Municipality of St. Vital the opportunity later that year to purchase the bridge for $5,000; they would make the necessary repairs. The bridge was reopened in 1946 with tolls removed. During the summer of that year, the bridge was temporarily closed due to a repair project that involved replacing the wood under the asphalt. The project involved two layers of asphalt poured over the wood, from the cordite plant in Transcona.

In 1950, the Red River flood nearly washed the bridge away as water reached its deck level. On 1 May 1957, the now-popular ice-cream vendor, Bridge Drive-In (BDI), was opened adjacent to the bridge.

In 1974, the bridge was closed off to vehicular traffic, remaining accessible only to pedestrians and cyclists ever since.

Facing heavy renovation costs for the bridge in the mid-1990s, the city looked into the possibility of tearing it down. However, after discovering that such an endeavour would cost $1,000,000, the city backed off the idea. In the spring of 2010, the bridge's concrete piers were fixed for $300,000.

On 24 May 2014, Winnipeg celebrated the Bridge's 100th anniversary, with city councillors Brian Mayes (St. Vital) and Jenny Gerbasi (Fort Rouge–East Fort Garry) unveiling a plaque to commemorate the occasion.

The Park Line streetcar route provided access to Elm Park and downtown Winnipeg via the Elm Park bridge.
