= Park Bridge (British Columbia) =

Highway bridge in British Columbia

- Coordinates: 51°16′42″N 116°48′23″W
- Carries: 4 lanes of Highway 1 (Trans-Canada Highway)
- Crosses: Kicking Horse River
- Locale: Near Golden, British Columbia
- Maintained by: British Columbia Ministry of Transportation & Infrastructure

Characteristics
- Total length: 405 metres (1,329 ft)
- Height: 90 metres (300 ft)
- Longest span: 80 metres (260 ft)

History
- Construction cost: $130 million
- Opened: August 30, 2007

Statistics
- Daily traffic: 10,000

Location
- Interactive map of Park Bridge

The Park Bridge is a highway bridge in the Kicking Horse Canyon. The Trans-Canada Highway traverses the Kicking Horse River between Yoho National Park and Golden, British Columbia. This new bridge and the associated Ten Mile Hill section that was completed in 2007 were an upgrade to the old roadway.

== History ==
In 1992, the province planned to replace the original two-lane Park Bridge with a four-lane divided 100 km/h (60 mph) highway standard structure to reduce congestion and accidents, and increase passing opportunities. Construction began in 2004 and the new Park Bridge opened 21 months ahead of schedule when it was originally scheduled to open in August 2008. It is 405 metres (1,330 ft) long, and it cost $130 million with 5.8 km (3.6 mi) of upgrades to the approaches. About 10,000 vehicles use this section daily; 24% of traffic is heavy truck traffic.

== See also ==
- List of bridges in Canada
