= J. C. Van Horne Bridge =

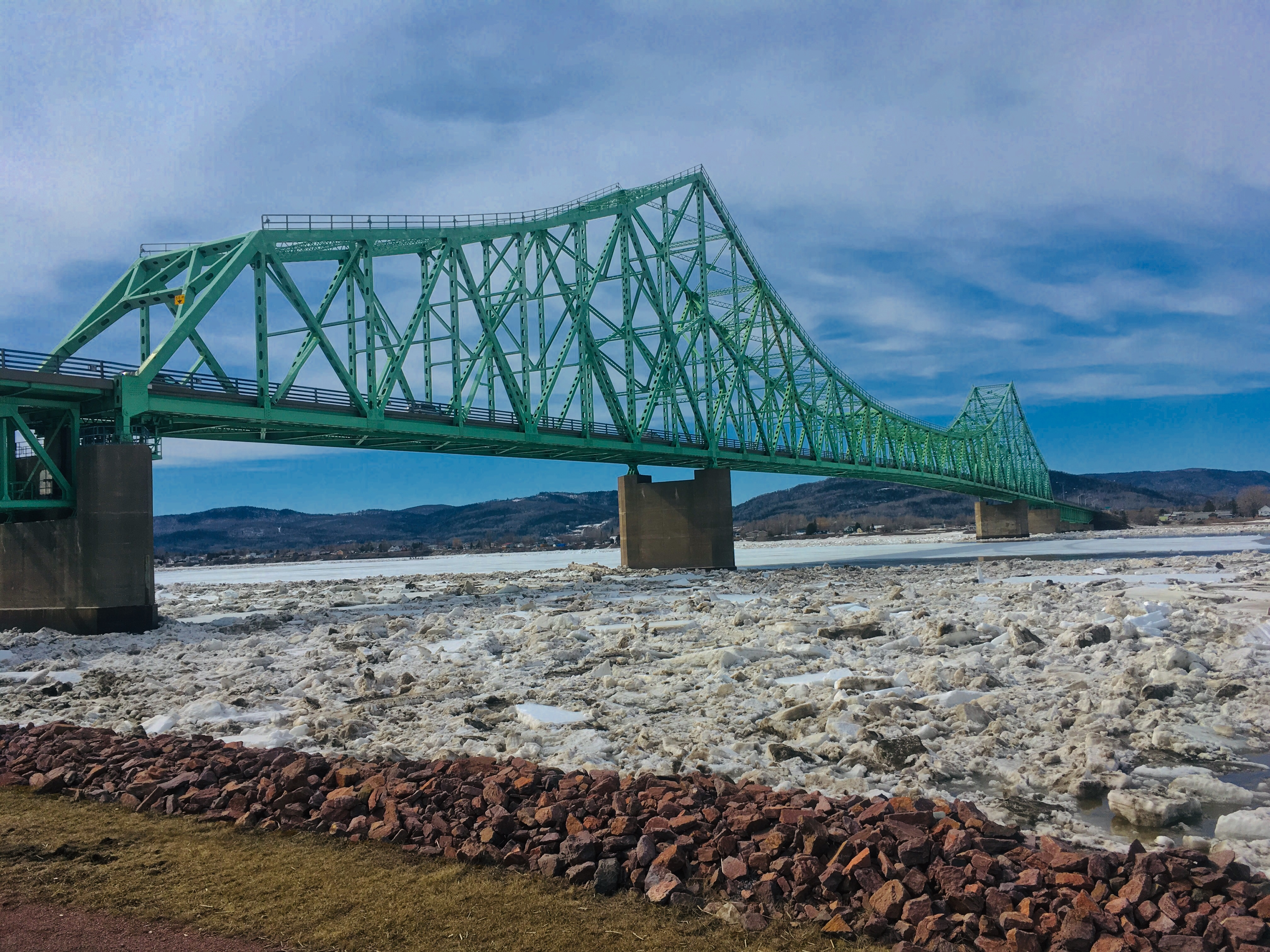
- The J.C. Van Horne Bridge as seen from Campbellton, facing Quebec
- Coordinates: 48°0′40.52″N 66°40′50.84″W
- Crosses: Restigouche River
- Locale: Campbellton, New Brunswick, Pointe-à-la-Croix, Quebec, Listuguj Miꞌgmaq First Nation
- Official name: J.C. Van Horne Bridge
- Other name(s): Van Horne Bridge

Characteristics
- Design: Steel Truss Bridge
- Total length: 805 m (2,641 ft)
- Width: 2 Lanes, 2 Sidewalks
- Longest span: 380 m (1,247 ft)

History
- Construction start: June, 1958
- Opened: October 15, 1961

Statistics
- Daily traffic: 11,700 (2012)

The J. C. Van Horne Bridge is a Canadian steel through truss/steel deck truss bridge crossing the Restigouche River between Campbellton, New Brunswick, and Pointe-à-la-Croix, Quebec.

Built between June 1958 and October 1961, the bridge was opened to traffic on October 15, 1961. As an interprovincial crossing, the bridge was constructed under a three-party agreement between the governments of Canada, New Brunswick, and Quebec.

Measuring 805 m (2641.07 ft) in total length, the bridge consists of four deck-truss approach-spans joined in the middle with a cantilever-through-truss structure. The middle structure is composed of two anchor spans and one clear span over the navigational channel measuring 380 m (1246.71 ft). It carries two traffic lanes and two sidewalks.

== History ==
Crossing the Restigouche River between Campbellton, New Brunswick, and Pointe-à-la-Croix, Quebec, had long been a bone of contention by locals in both provinces. A federally-funded interprovincial ferry service between the two communities had proven adequate until the 1950s, when vehicle traffic began to grow at much higher rate than had been forecast.

By 1947, the local New Brunswick PC Member of Parliament, J.C. Van Horne, made the case for a bridge and invited representatives from the federal and provincial governments to witness a "typical weekend" lineup at the ferry. Van Horne had chosen the St. John's weekend (on or around June 24) in which the lineups would be predictably long on both sides. The government representatives were convinced of the need for a bridge to replace the ferry service and acceded to Van Horne's wishes. The bridge was later named in his honour.

== Gallery ==
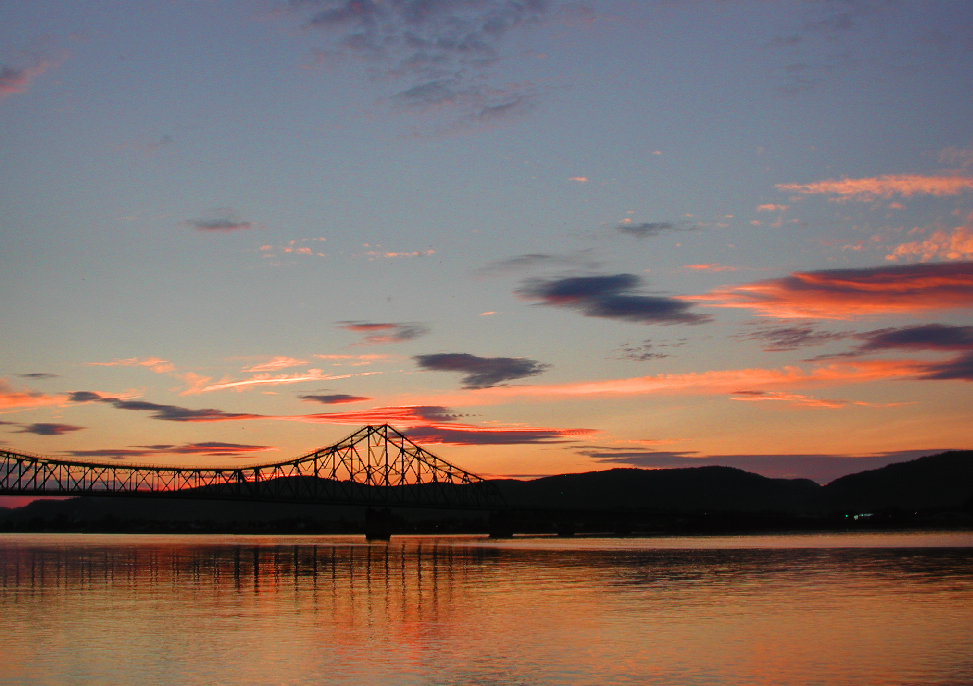
J.C. Van Horne Bridge in Campbellton over the Restigouche River

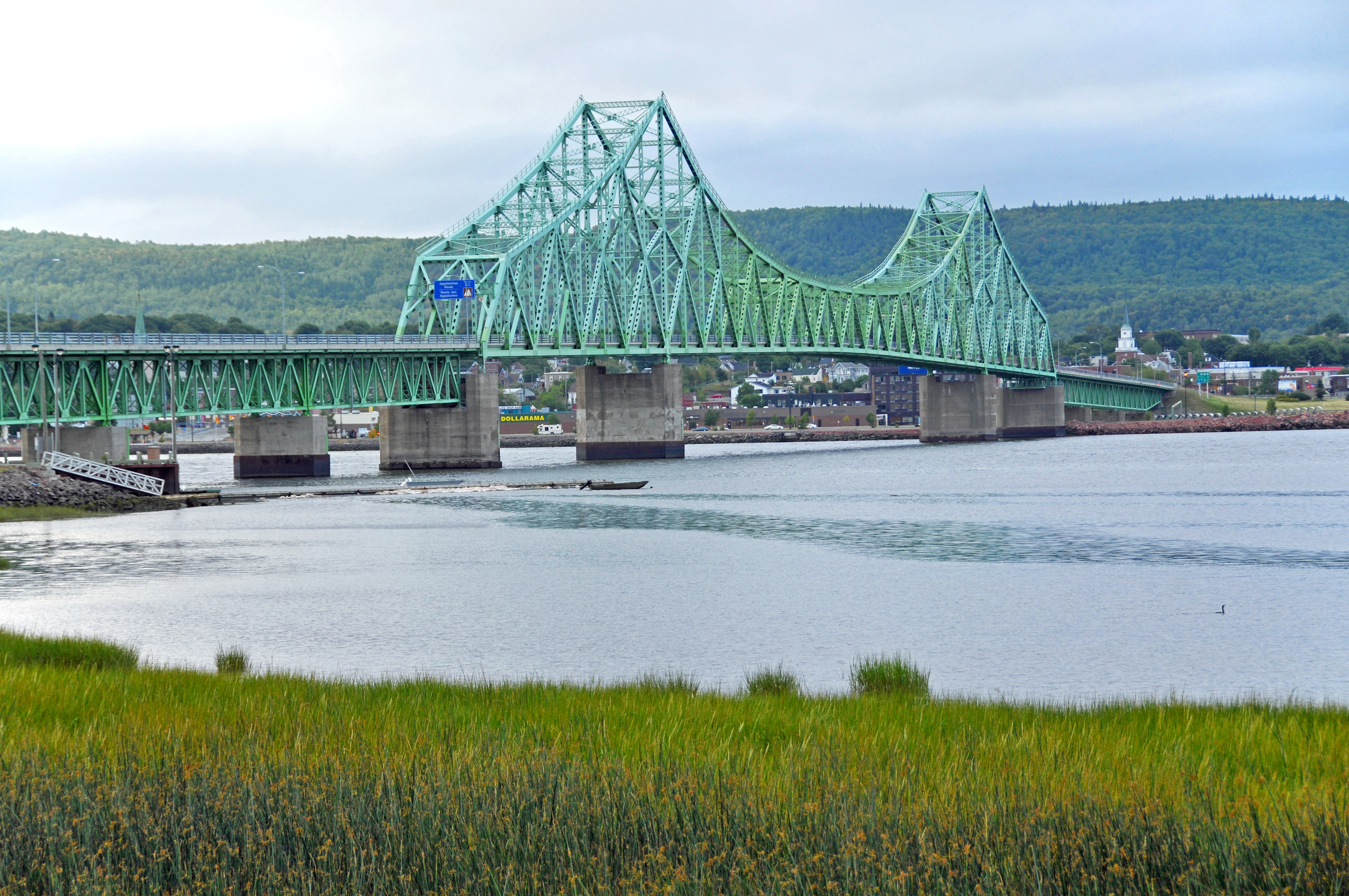
J.C. Van Horne Bridge as seen from Listuguj

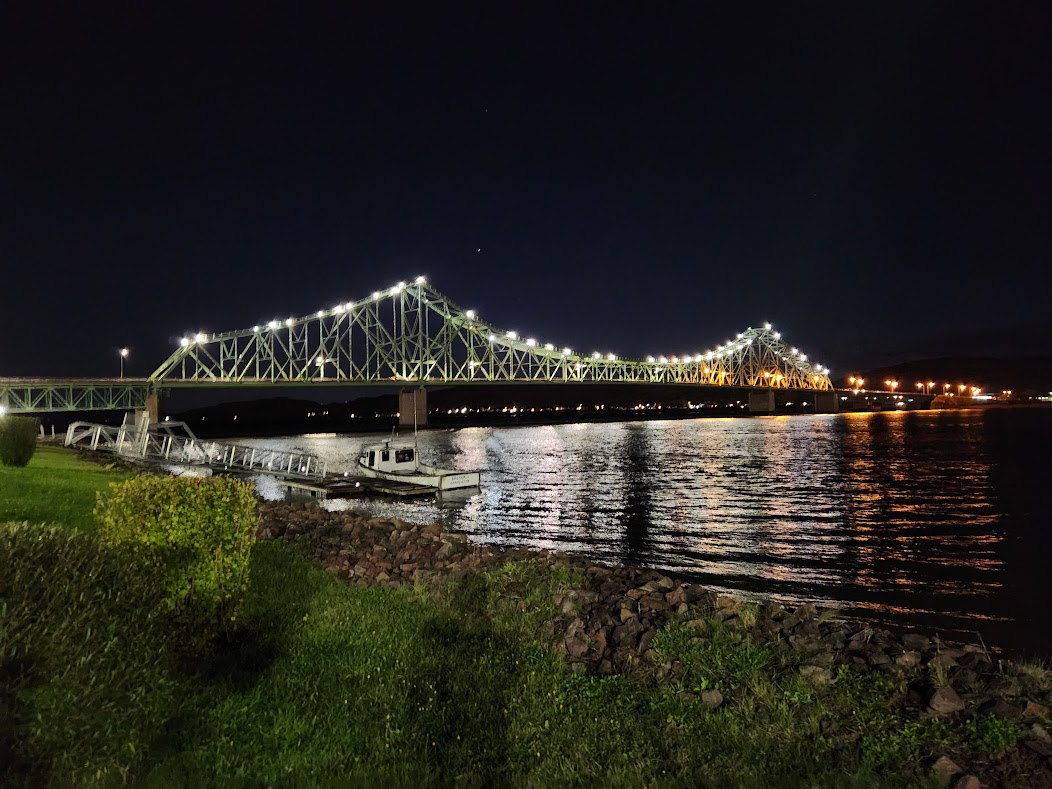
J. C. Van Horn Bridge at night

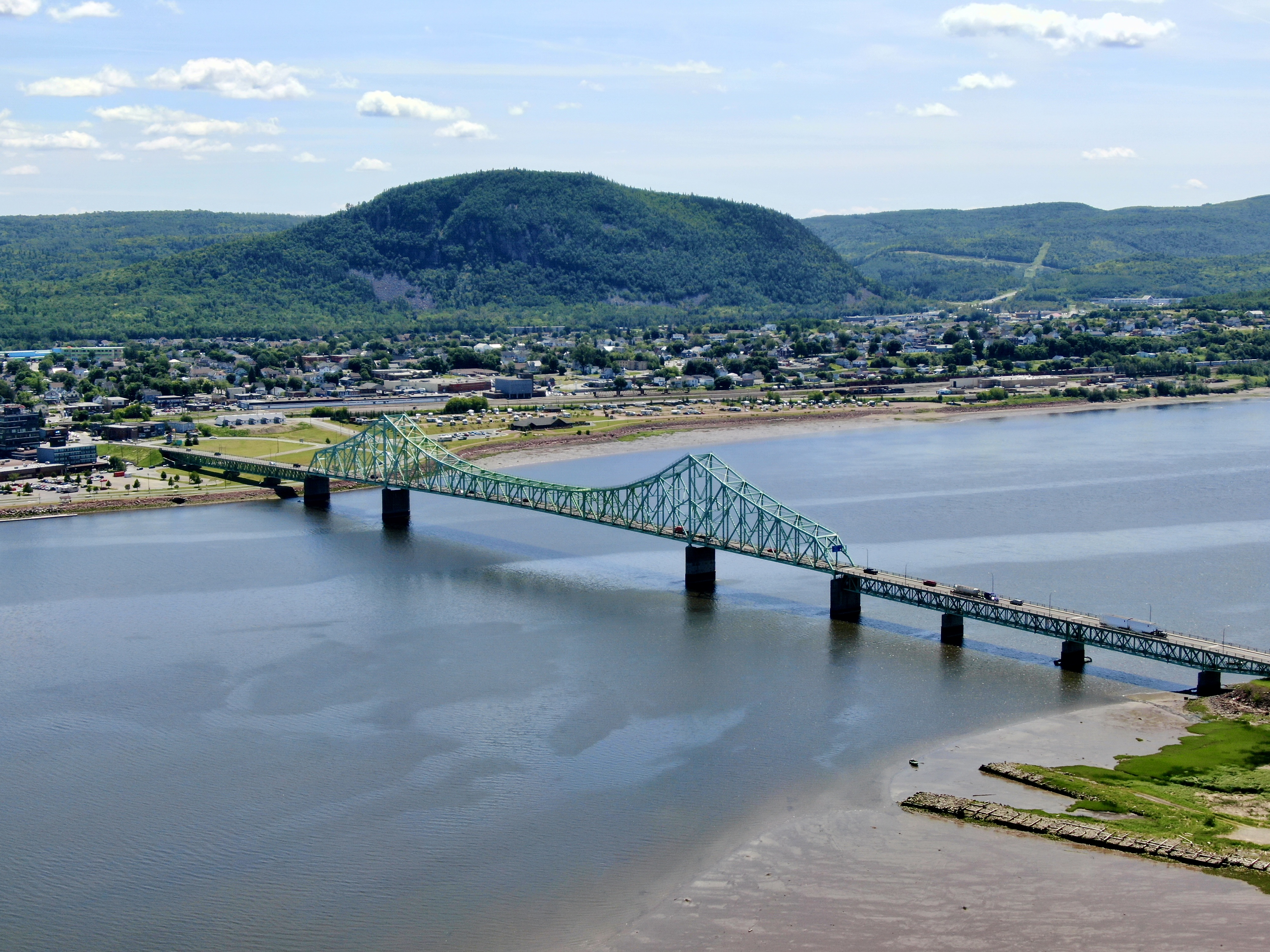
J. C. Van Horn Bridge from the air

J. C. Van Horne Bridge, Canada.jpg

== See also ==
- List of bridges in Canada
