= Briggs Bridge, Alberta =

Timber bridge in Alberta, Canada

Briggs Bridge
- Coordinates: 52°20′32″N 113°54′14″W
- Carries: Railway
- Crosses: Blindman River tributary
- Locale: Briggs, Alberta

Characteristics
- Design: Wooden trestle
- Total length: 590ft (estimated)

History
- Constructed by: Alberta Central Railway

Briggs Bridge is a railway bridge in Central Alberta. It is one of the few remaining timber bridges in Alberta. It is currently in use.

== See also ==
- List of bridges in Canada
