= Overlanders Bridge =

Bridge in Kamloops, British Columbia, Canada

- Coordinates: 50°40′53.7″N 120°20′59.8″W
- Carries: Four lanes of Fortune Dr, pedestrians and bicycles
- Crosses: Thompson River
- Locale: Kamloops, British Columbia

Characteristics
- Design: Arch Bridge
- Total length: 600 m

History
- Opened: 22 November 1961

Statistics
- Daily traffic: 42,000

Location
- Interactive map of Overlanders Bridge

The Overlanders Bridge is a bridge that spans the Thompson River in Kamloops, British Columbia. It connects Fortune Drive and Tranquille Road in the north with Victoria Street in the south. The bridge opened on November 22, 1961, becoming the third bridge to traverse the Thompson River in this location (1901, 1925). The bridge carries approximately 42,000 vehicles daily. The City of Kamloops rehabilitated the bridge in 2015 following reports indicating significant wear on both the bridge deck and the west sidewalk.

Overlanders was the winning entry, submitted by Joan Lyons, to a naming contest run by the Kamloops Sentinel newspaper. The name commemorates the pioneers who travelled overland from Fort Garry, Manitoba to Kamloops in 1862. The incorrect name of Overlander is in common use and previously appeared in official documentation before being corrected to Overlanders.

== See also ==
- List of bridges in Canada
