= Eleanor Ward Bridge =

Bridge in Coquitlam, British Columbia, Canada

- Coordinates: 49.294941°N 122.774786°W
- Carries: 4 lanes of traffic, pedestrians and bicycles
- Crosses: Coquitlam River
- Locale: Coquitlam, B.C.
- Maintained by: City of Coquitlam

Characteristics
- Total length: 127 m

History
- Construction start: March 1, 2004
- Opened: August 26, 2006

Location
- Interactive map of Eleanor Ward Bridge

The Eleanor Ward Bridge is a four-lane road bridge in Coquitlam, British Columbia. It spans the Coquitlam River, connecting the Coquitlam Town Centre area with the Burke Mountain area of northeast Coquitlam. The $25 million bridge, with a span of 127 m (417 ft.), opened on August 26, 2006.

The bridge construction was part of the David Avenue Connector project, officially launched on March 1, 2004, and included a second smaller bridge over Hyde Creek and two kilometres of new road between Pipeline Road in the west to Coast Meridian Road in the east. The roadway featured two travel lanes in each direction, four new traffic signals, on-street bicycle lanes, a new sidewalk, a mixed use path and improved street lighting. At the time, it was the largest infrastructure project ever undertaken by the City of Coquitlam.

The bridge was dedicated to the memory of Eleanor Ward, a longtime Coquitlam community volunteer.

== See also ==
- List of bridges in Canada
