= Florenceville Bridge =

Bridge in Florenceville, New Brunswick, Canada

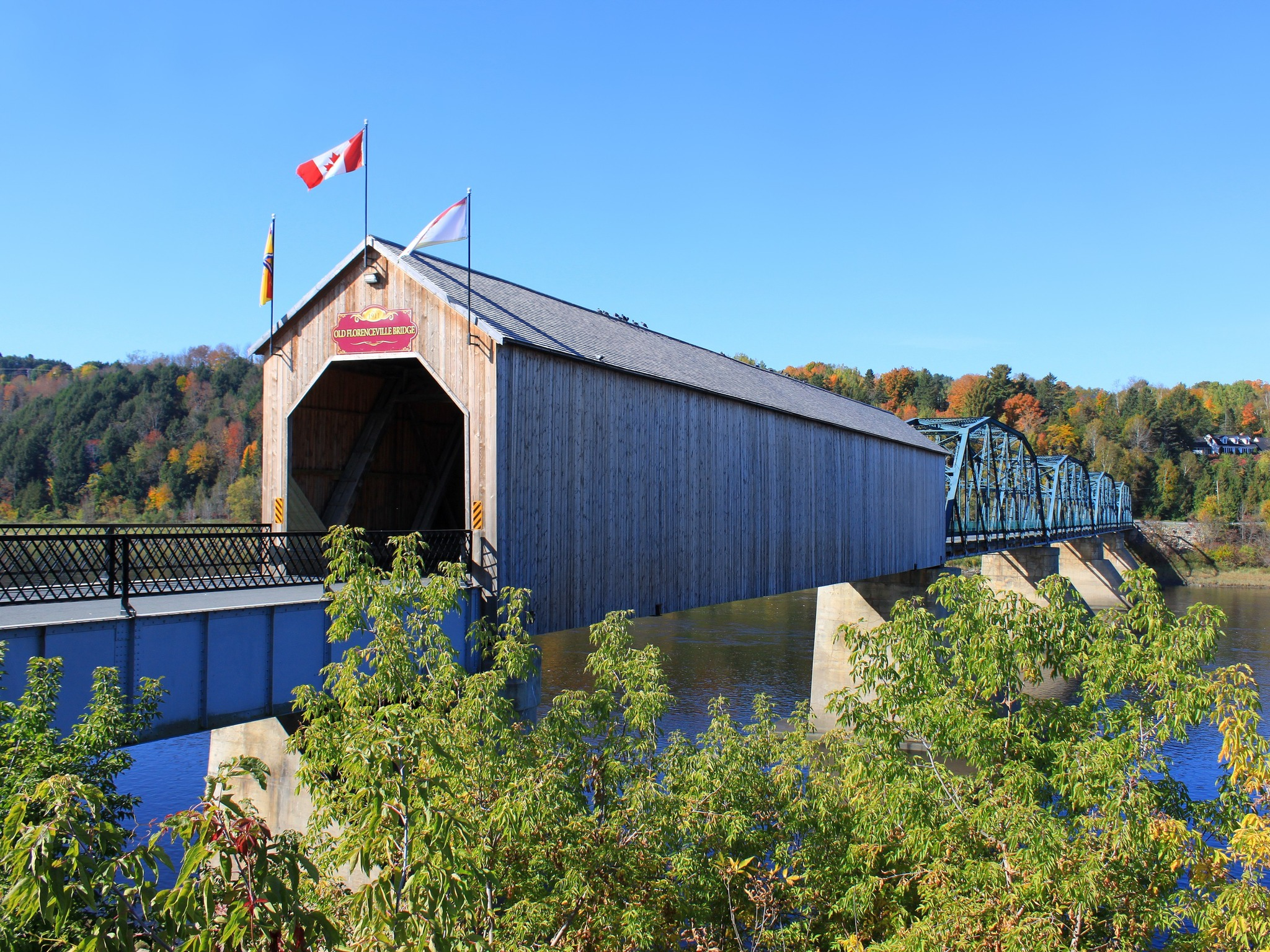
- The bridge across the Saint John River is partly covered.
- Coordinates: 46.441672°N 67.621279°W
- Crosses: Saint John River
- Locale: Florenceville, New Brunswick, Canada

Characteristics
- Material: Wood
- Trough construction: Steel

History
- Opened: 1887
- Rebuilt: 1907

Location
- Interactive map of Florenceville Bridge

The Florenceville Bridge consists of one wooden covered span combined with four steel truss spans and one girder span, which crosses the Saint John River at Florenceville, New Brunswick, Canada. The bridge has evolved from a five-span uncovered wooden Burr Truss structure, built in 1884 and 1885 and was officially opened in 1886. In 1906 the western span was converted to a covered How Truss, and in 1907 the eastern span was converted to the present covered How Truss, effectively replacing the original structure.

In 1911 the three middle spans were replaced with the present steel spans, and in 1917 the original wooden piers were replaced with concrete piers. In 1932 the western wooden How Truss span was destroyed by fire and was replaced with the steel span which is there today. This is the only fire that ever damaged the bridge. Today the Florenceville Bridge is the oldest bridge across the Saint John River in the same place as when originally opened.

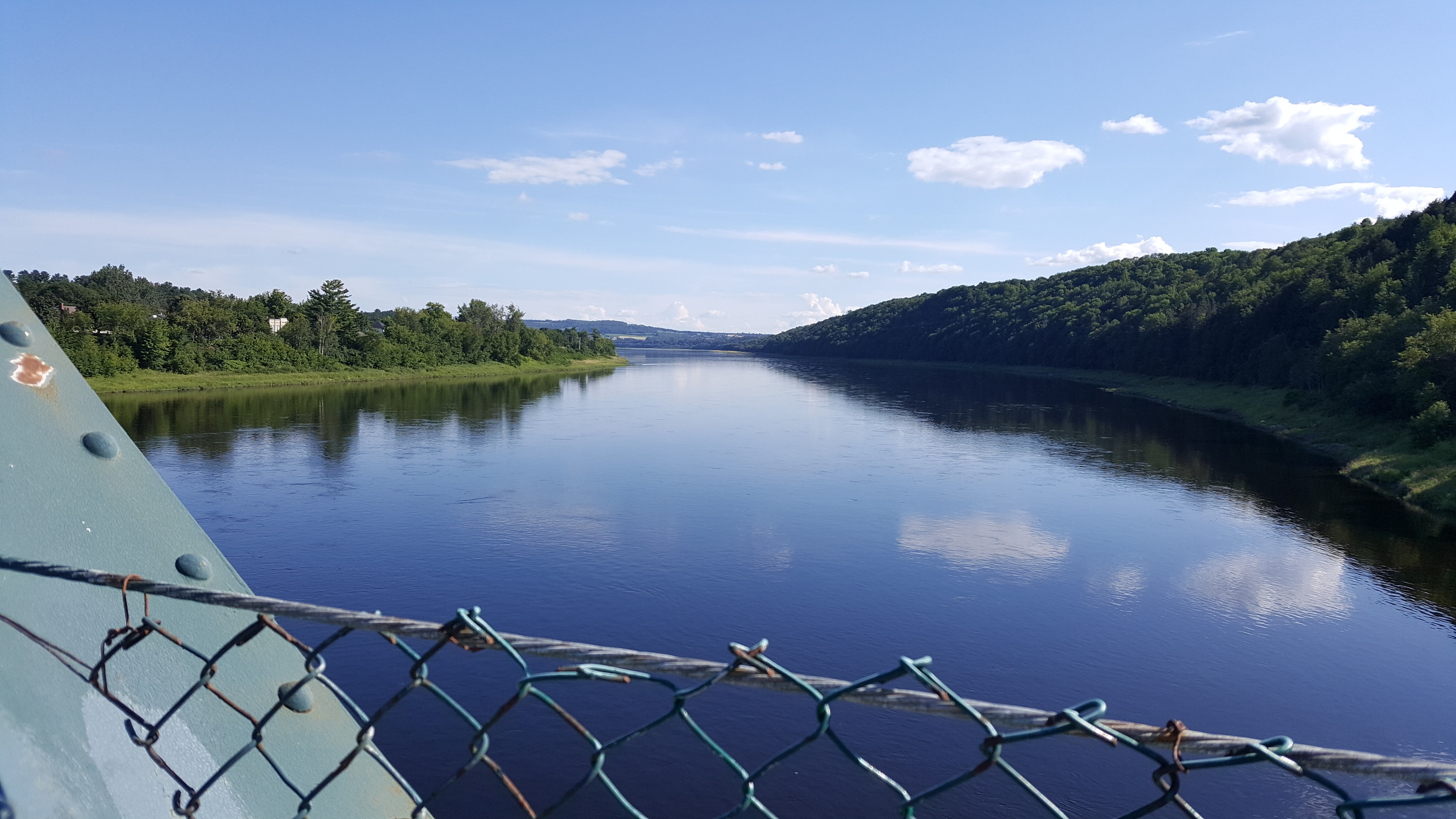
Saint John River viewed from the Old Florenceville Bridge

The Old Florenceville Bridge has been closed to vehicular traffic since late 2020. However, it remains open to pedestrian and bicycle traffic. The bridge affords scenic views of the Saint John River and the Town of Florenceville-Bristol. In 2024 the government cancelled plans to renovate the structure.

== See also ==
- List of bridges in Canada
