= Span (engineering) =

Distance between supports of an arch, bridge, etc.

In engineering, span is the distance between two adjacent structural supports (e.g., two piers) of a structural member (e.g., a beam). Span is measured in the horizontal direction either between the faces of the supports (clear span) or between the centers of the bearing surfaces (effective span). For a bridge, the total span is the distance between the faces of the abutments:

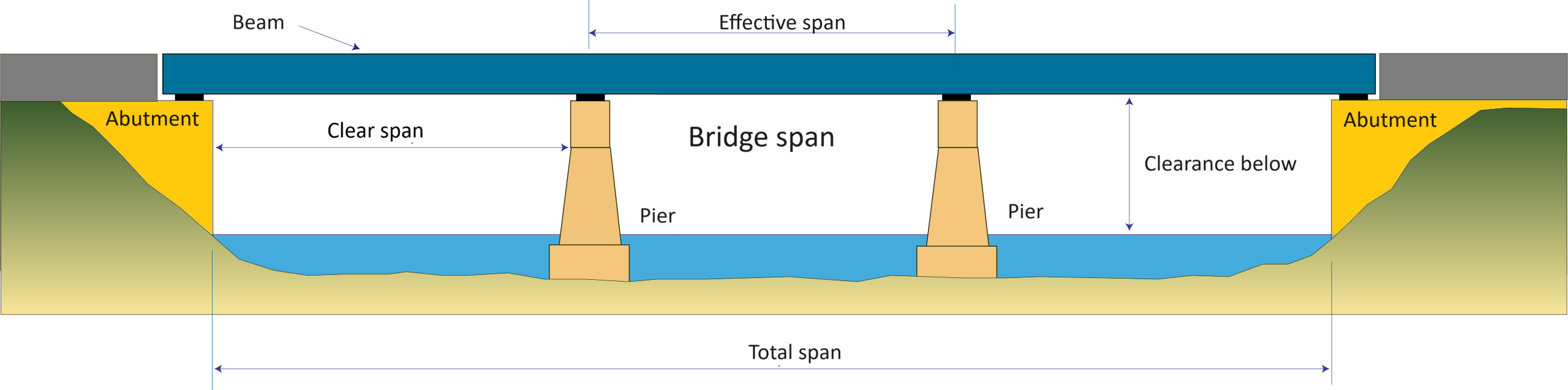

A span can be closed by a solid beam or by a rope. The first kind is used for bridges, the second one for power lines, overhead telecommunication lines, some type of antennas or for aerial tramways.

Side view of a simply supported beam (top) bending under an evenly distributed load (bottom).

Span is a significant factor in finding the strength and size of a beam as it determines the maximum bending moment and deflection. The maximum bending moment $M_{max}$ and deflection $\delta_{max}$in the pictured beam is found using:

$$M_{max} = \frac {q L^2} {8}$$

$$\delta_{max} = \frac {5 M_{max} L^2} {48 E I} = \frac {5 q L^4} {384 E I}$$

where

$q$ = Uniformly distributed load
$L$ = Length of the beam between two supports (span)
$E$ = Modulus of elasticity
$I$ = Area moment of inertia

The maximum bending moment and deflection occur midway between the two supports. From this it follows that if the span is doubled, the maximum moment (and with it the stress) will quadruple, and deflection will increase by a factor of sixteen.

== See also ==
- List of spans — longest spans of ropes used as power lines, antennas or aerial tramways.
- List of longest suspension bridge spans
- List of longest cantilever bridge spans

== Sources ==
- Brett, P. (2012). Illustrated Dictionary of Building. CRC Press. ISBN 978-1-135-13857-8.
