= Dollarton Bridge =

Bridge in North Vancouver, British Columbia, Canada

Coordinates: 49.305145°N 123.022°W

The Dollarton Bridge comprises a pair of two-lane reinforced concrete spans the Seymour River in North Vancouver, British Columbia, Canada. It was built in 2005, and replaced a two-lane steel truss bridge built in 1948. To avoid a total shutdown of the Dollarton Highway, half of the new bridge was built and opened to traffic before the old bridge was demolished, and then the remaining half of the new bridge was finished.

The bridge, which is part of the Dollarton Highway, provides 4 lanes of road traffic and two 3 metres (9.8 ft) wide pedestrian-bicycle sidewalks. It is 153 metres (502 ft) long.

== See also ==
- List of bridges in Canada
