= Morrissy Bridge =

Bridge in Miramichi, New Brunswick, Canada

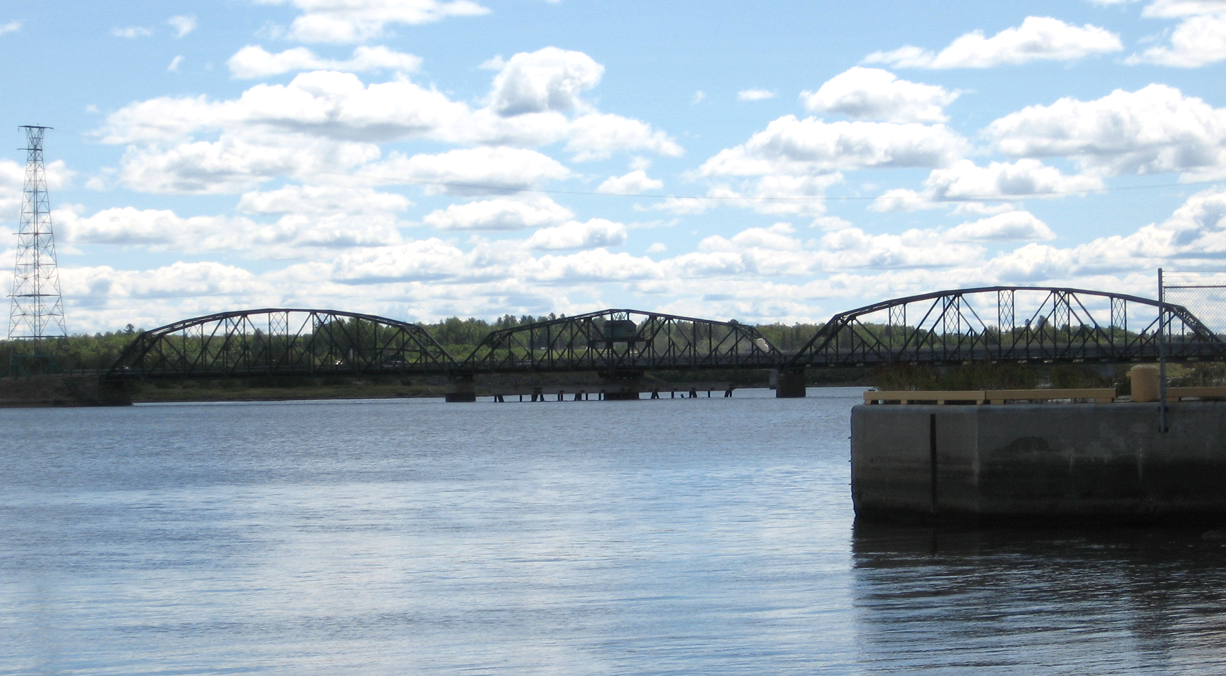
- Coordinates: 46°59′49″N 65°33′31″W
- Crosses: Miramichi River

Characteristics
- Design: Truss
- Material: Steel

History
- Fabrication by: Dominion Bridge Company Limited
- Construction start: 1913
- Construction end: November 1914
- Opened: November 1914
- Closed: September 2008

Location
- Interactive map of Morrissy Bridge

The Morrissy Bridge is a steel truss bridge crossing the Miramichi River at Miramichi, New Brunswick, Canada.

Construction of Morrissy bridge began in 1913 and was completed and opened in November 1914. Named after Hon. John Morrissy, the Minister of Public Works, it was hailed as "one of the greatest structures in the province", and provided the first fixed road link between the former town of Newcastle and communities on the south side of the river. The bridge created a new obstacle for navigation, but a swing span in the bridge allowed large vessels to pass.

The Morrissy Bridge was badly damaged on 5 November 1971 when the Panamanian registered Liberty Ship Grand Valor struck the second pier of the bridge while departing the Newcastle Wharf with a load of pulpwood. Several heavy trusses were knocked out and the swing span was moved off its bearing pad. Repairs took three weeks and the vessel was arrested and later released.

The swing span is no longer used, and the narrow deck of the bridge is now viewed as substandard. The new Miramichi Bridge completed in 1995 provides a wider, safer crossing only 1 km upstream. It has created a newer, permanent obstacle to upstream navigation.

In 2008 the New Brunswick Department of Transportation carried out a detailed structural analysis and concluded that the bridge's steel deck supports had corroded to the point where the bridge was no longer safe for use. The Morrissy Bridge was closed permanently because of safety concerns Friday 12 September 2008. The bridge was to be dismantled, and not be replaced.

A coalition of trails enthusiasts opposed the demolition; and in 2010, the Miramichi Active Transportation Master Plan included the structure in its long range plan, stating: "The Morrissy Bridge is the vital cog in the Miramichi AT Plan. Much like the old train bridge in Fredericton, the Morrissy Bridge is the only really safe option for non-motorists to cross the river. The bridge's site also provides a key connection to downtown commerce and to Ritchie Wharf. Restoration of the bridge for trail users should be the number one priority of the AT Plan."

Inaction on the part of the different levels of government has resulted in the bridge remaining unrepaired, officially and physically closed to foot and small vehicle traffic, though the bridge still experiences daily use from pedestrians, bicyclists, motorcyclists and anglers who sidestep the barriers, reportedly due to the bridge's convenient location.

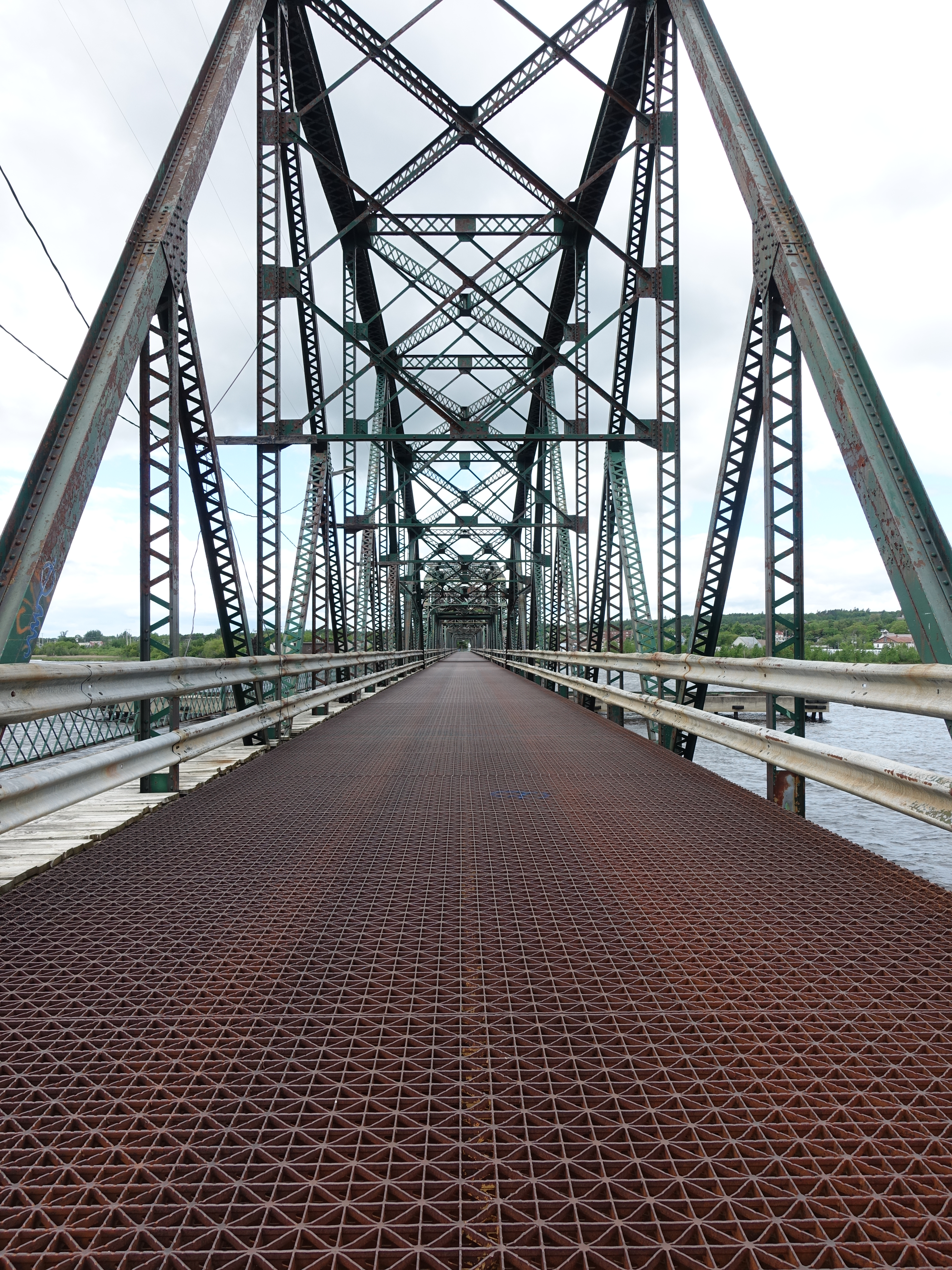
Morrissy Bridge, Miramichi. Steel deck view East to West.

== See also ==
- List of bridges in Canada
