= Assiniboine River Bridge =

Coordinates: 49.955°N 98.185°W

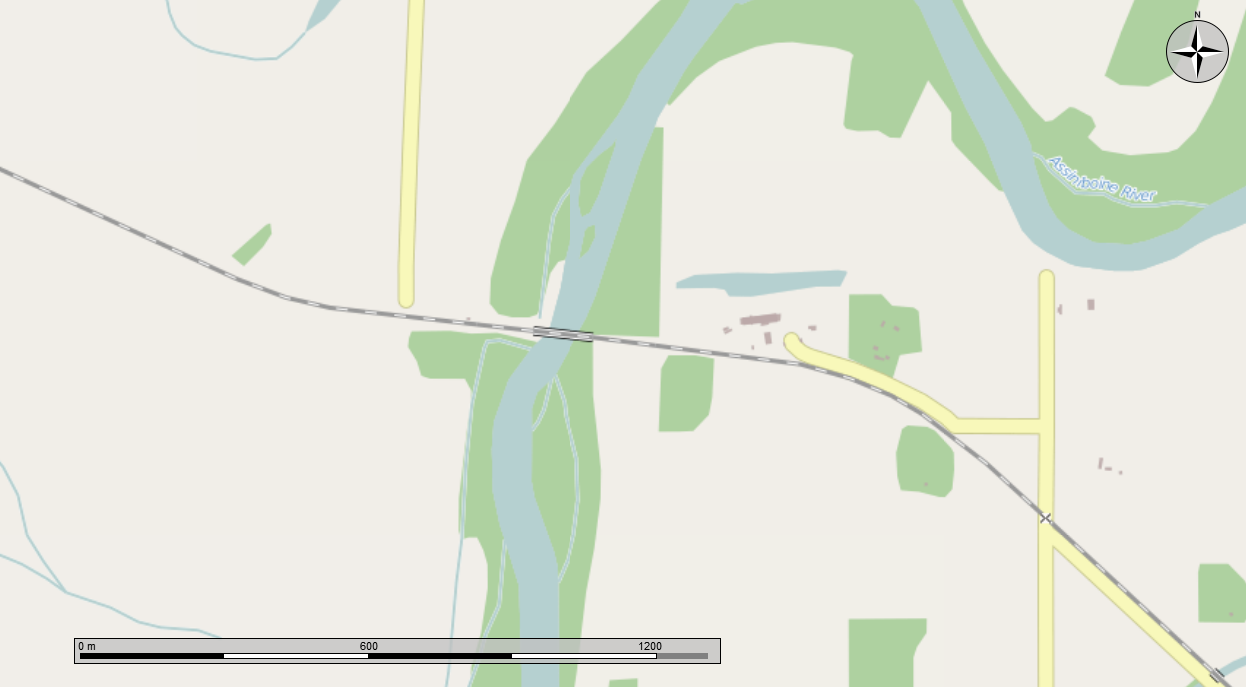
Map showing location of the bridge.

The Assiniboine River Bridge is a railway bridge situated 8 km east of Portage la Prairie, Manitoba, Canada. The bridge is located at Mile 50.4 in Canadian National Railway's Rivers Subdivision.

== Architecture ==
The original bridge was a single track, 125 m (412 ft) long and consists of two 35.6 m (177 ft) through truss spans placed between two 25.2 m (83 ft) through plate girder spans. The spans were built in 1906 and were designed to Government of Canada 1901 Specification (equivalent to E-48 Cooper loading).

== History ==
A slow order was required to operate heavy axle load cars over this structure. The railroad determined that to improve operations, the aging spans had to be replaced. It was found to be not much more expensive to replace the entire span than simply replacing the floor system of the bridge. The concrete piers and abutments were found to be in good condition and could be reused. The railway decided to replace all four spans of this older bridge.

To this end, a new double-track bridge was proposed. After the required engineering and environmental regulatory permits and approvals were secured, Canam Structural of Quebec City, Quebec was selected for the fabrication of the steel spans. This was carried out from the fall of 2000 to the spring of 2001.

The newly built spans were through plate girder spans of the same length as the old spans. These were designed for Cooper E90 loading with diesel impact. The floor system of the bridge consisted of rolled sections installed transverse to the main girders, with a steel deck plate installed on top of the floor beams.

The budget for the new bridge project was established at $5.6 million CAD. The new bridge was safely completed with no major problems. The work was done within the time available and within budget.

The old structure was dismantled and hauled away by truck. The disturbed ground surface was restored to its original profile and was seeded with appropriate vegetation in the spring of 2002. The bridge itself was completed in January 2002.
