= List of cantilever bridges =

- Alexandra Bridge
- Astoria–Megler Bridge
- Battersea Bridge
- Bolte Bridge
- Bridge of the Gods (modern structure)
- Carquinez Bridge
- Champlain Bridge
- Commodore Barry Bridge - 1,644 feet (501 m)
- Conde McCullough Memorial Bridge
- Crescent City Connection - 1,575 feet (480 m)
- El Ferdan Railway Bridge
- Forth Bridge - 520 metres (1,710 ft) cantilever span
- George Washington Memorial Bridge
- Gramercy Bridge
- Hawk Street Viaduct - 996 feet (304 m) demolished in 1970
- Howrah Bridge
- Huey P. Long Bridge (Baton Rouge)
- Huey P. Long Bridge (Jefferson Parish)
- Ironworkers Memorial Second Narrows Bridge - collapsed in 1958
- Jamestown Bridge - replaced in 1992, demolished in 2006
- Jacques Cartier Bridge
- Lewis and Clark Bridge
- Long Biên Bridge - 106 metres (348 ft) cantilever span
- Marquam Bridge
- Million Dollar Bridge
- Newburgh-Beacon Bridge - 2,204 feet (672 m) cantilever span
- Pamban Bridge
- Pulaski Skyway
- Quebec Bridge - 549 metres (1,801 ft) cantilever span
- Queensboro Bridge
- Rainbow Bridge (Texas) - 680 feet (210 m) main span
- Richmond–San Rafael Bridge
- San Francisco–Oakland Bay Bridge
- Sea Cliff Bridge
- Seongsu Bridge - collapsed in 1994, rebuilt in 1997
- Sunshine Skyway Bridge (old bridge)
- Tappan Zee Bridge - 369 metres (1,211 ft) cantilever span - replaced in 2017
- Tobin Bridge
- Tokyo Gate Bridge
