= Burton Bridge =

Bridge in Burton, New Brunswick

Coordinates: 45°51′53.0″N 66°27′4.5″W

The Burton Bridge is a steel through arch crossing the Saint John River between Maugerville and Burton, New Brunswick, Canada. The bridge connects routes 102 and 105 (formerly the Trans-Canada Highway), but has no numerical designation of its own.

The bridge opened in 1973, replacing a cable ferry service in the area; and is 765 metres [2509 feet] in length, and 56 metres [185 feet] tall.

In 1993, a 13-year-old boy fell from the bridge.

== See also ==
- List of bridges in Canada
