= Burton, New Brunswick =

Community in New Brunswick, Canada

Coordinates: 45.884272°N 66.346433°W

Location of Burton in New Brunswick

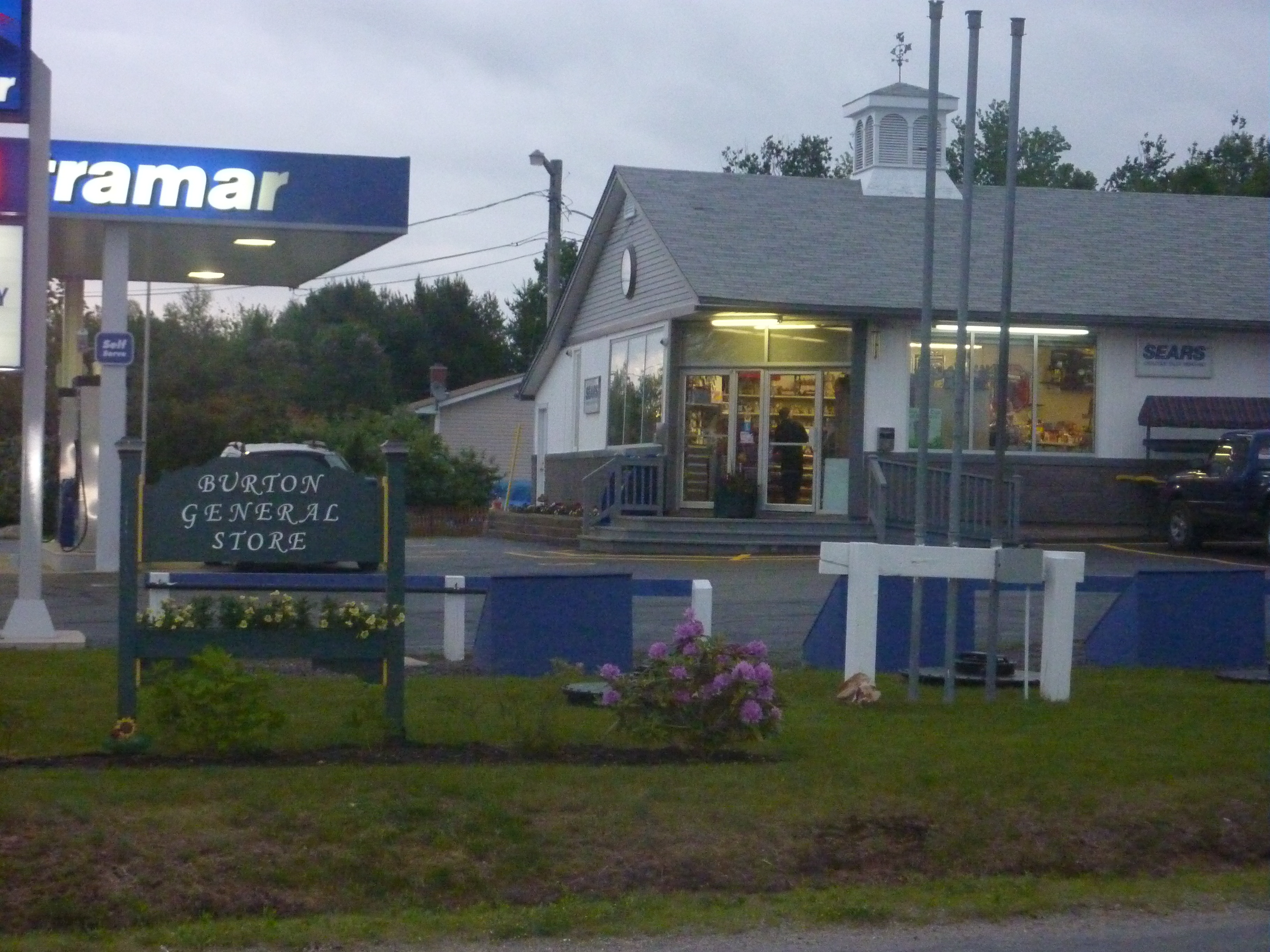
Burton General Store

Burton is a Canadian rural community in Sunbury County, New Brunswick.

== Geography ==
Located on the Saint John River immediately downstream (southeast) of Oromocto on New Brunswick Route 102. Burton is the shire town of the county and is the location of the Sunbury County courthouse.

== Services ==
Burton has an elementary school for children from kindergarten to grade 2, educating about 40 students at a given time. Older children go to various other Anglophone West schools located in Oromocto.

Burton also has a court house and a general store, Ultramar. The first gas station in Burton was opened by the late Mr. Bonnar, eventually run by his son and sold to Mr. Finnan in the 1970s. It remained a full-service Petro-Canada until its closure in 2003.

Located adjacent to the Canadian Forces Combat Training Centre at CFB Gagetown, noises from artillery, helicopters, and other military equipment are common aspects of daily life in Burton, especially near Hamilton Road which becomes a dirt trail leading into the training area, across a former military rail line now used as a tank run.

== History ==
Of historical interest is an old homestead near the Burton Bridge, about which further information is required. Local accounts of the history mention a tree near the homestead used for an extrajudicial hanging in the mid-19th century. Several other aged buildings can be found in the area, including a mid-19th century house which stands across from the Burton trailer park on New Brunswick Route 102. The hanging tree is behind the Burton Trailer Park in the "Dead Woods".

== Sunbury County Courthouse ==
The local courthouse located in Burton, while in the process of being decommissioned, was at one time the host of landmark historical trials in New Brunswick and Canada at large.

== See also ==
- List of communities in New Brunswick
