= Pointe-à-la-Croix =

- Municipality
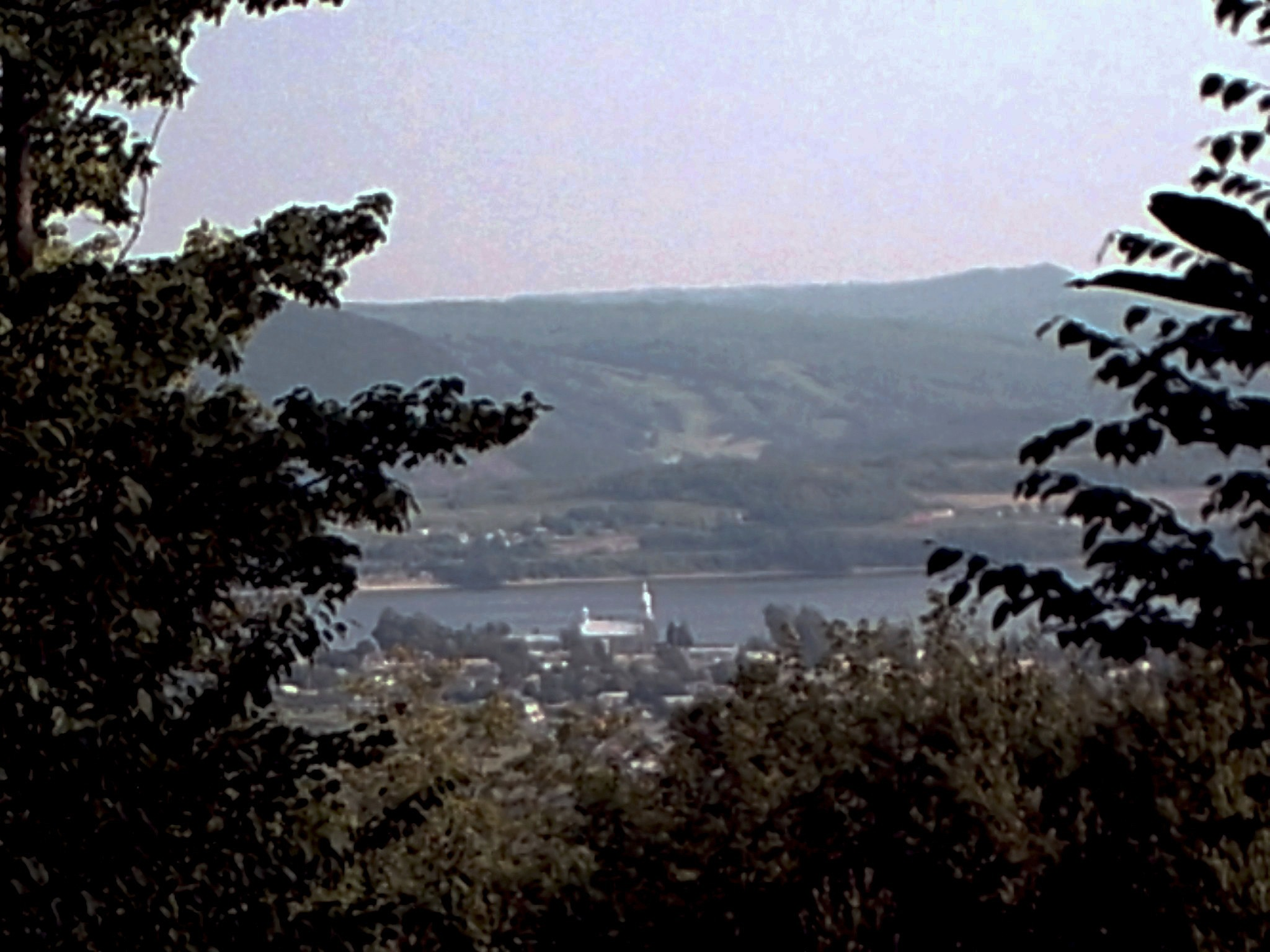

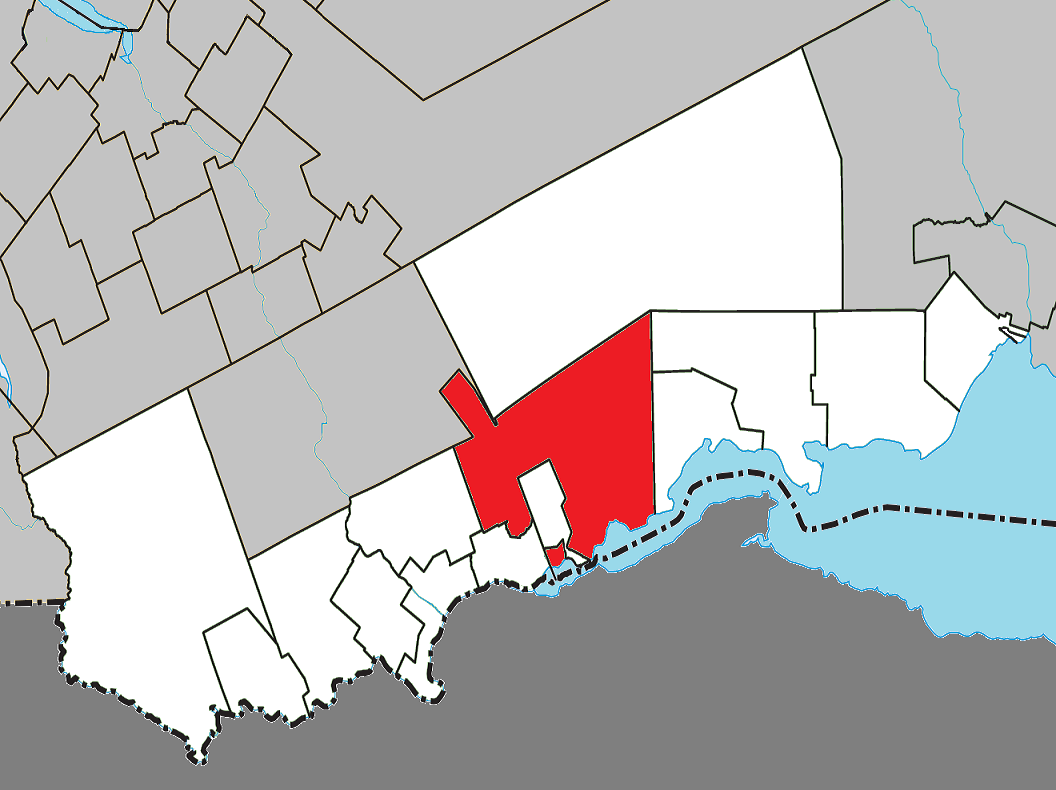
- Location within Avignon RCM

- Location in eastern Quebec
- Coordinates: 48°01′N 66°41′W
- Country: Canada
- Province: Quebec
- Region: Gaspésie– Îles-de-la-Madeleine
- RCM: Avignon
- Settled: 1750s
- Constituted: May 7, 1983

Government
  - Mayor: Pascal Bujold
  - Federal riding: Gaspésie—Les Îles-de-la-Madeleine—Listuguj
  - Prov. riding: Bonaventure

Area
  - Total: 416.25 km^{2} (160.72 sq mi)
  - Land: 390.73 km^{2} (150.86 sq mi)

Population (2021)
  - Total: 1,344
  - Density: 3.4/km^{2} (8.8/sq mi)
  - Pop 2016-2021: ▼4.5%
  - Dwellings: 697
- Time zone: UTC−5 (EST)
  - Summer (DST): UTC−4 (EDT)
- Postal code(s): G0C 1L0
- Area codes: 418 and 581
- Highways: R-132
- Website: www.pointe-a-la-croix.com

Pointe-à-la-Croix (French pronunciation: [pwɛ̃t a la kʁwa]; Cross Point in English) is a municipality located on the Restigouche River in the Gaspésie region of eastern Quebec, Canada. It is situated across from the city of Campbellton, New Brunswick.

In addition to Pointe-à-la-Croix itself, the municipality also includes the communities of L'Alverne, Oak Bay, and Saint-Fidèle-de-Ristigouche.

The municipality is home to the site of the Battle of the Restigouche, a National Historic Site of Canada, and the Petite Rochelle interpretive centre. The town is listed as a Village rélais.

== History ==
The history of Cross-Point is based on a cross planted on a small point of land or a small barachois created by a small brook. It is about a half-mile west of Pleasant Loint, indicating a new border between land claimed by Isaac Mann and the newly surveyed Restigouche Indian Reserve. In historical documents, it is sometimes referred to as Crossing Point or Pointe de la traverse and so it is debatable whether the name derived from the fact it was the customary crossing point on this part of the river from the wooden cross indicating a border marking stolen property.

Isaac Mann lived at Pleasant Loint, not Cross Point. The local Mi'kmaq had remained relatively isolated from intrusion except by the European fishermen and a few fur traders and missionaries. The events leading up to the Battle of Restigouche were the beginning of a significant intrusion into the heart of Northern Mi'kmaq territory. The arrival of such a large population of destitute refugees had serious repercussions on the local Amerindian population by the obligation to hunt for survival amid depleting local game. Before the Battle of the Restigouche, they had lived in freedom all around the Bay of Chaleur especially in the Listuguj River. A census taken in 1760 also shows the presence of 500 Gaspesiens Métis. There is historical evidence suggesting discontent and tension between all of the newcomers. The area was named La Petite Rochelle in 1684 when it was granted to Charles Damours, the youngest of the five sons of Mathieu Damours, the owner of the concession de Matane.

La Seigneurie de Petite Rochelle extended from Ruisseau de L`Officier west and also included the concession of Matapedia. Charles was a for trader with a questionable reputation.

Many artefacts from a site in Restigouche-Sud Est have been discovered that may indicate a French establishment of the period (late 1600s). Further professional archaeological research needs to be done in this site. The Seigneurie was one of many that remained undeveloped. During the Battle of Ristigouche an eyewitness description of the events of the third of July 1760 refers to a sort of village or group of Acadian dwellings numbering between 150 and 200, burned by the English. He says that the village was called La Petite Rochelle. It was populated by 1003 Acadian refugees and 500 Métis Gaspesiens. Historically, it was the only French place name ever used in reference to this area.

The village had a short lifespan. It began as a stopping point for watercraft forced to wait before being able to continue upriver. Just below and north of Battery Point, a ship is well protected from the westerly wind. Off Battery Point, the channel is narrow creating a current of up to seven knots. To proceed upriver under sail from there required an east wind and a rising tide. This spot seems to have better suited the desperate Acadian refugee families arriving from southern Acadia. The first large group had arrived in 1757 with Joseph Leblanc dit Le Maigre and had spent the first winter near the Sugarloaf Mountain but transferred across to the place referred to as La Petite Rochelle in spring of 1760.

In a relatively-pristine undeveloped area, Mc Neil's Cove is an important archaeological site.

The first Euro-American settlement in the town was by Acadians fleeing the Expulsion in 1755. Retreating as far as possible up the Restigouche River, they were trapped by a British fleet in the Battle of Restigouche. Approximately 1500 Acadian and Métis took refuge here, with the local Mi'kmaq Native Americans. Their combined resistance was not able to prevent an English landing at their village, which they had named La Petite Rochelle, after the Seingeurie de La Petite Rochelle, situated at Point au Bourdon. The village was completely destroyed by fire on August 23, 1760. Further upriver near Listuguj, the Battle of Restigouche ended with all the French ships and most of the Acadians' boats sunk, but the English were not successful in landing. The Acadians had made their last stand here and survived. Their resistance was in effect a success.

After the conquest, Pointe-à-la-Croix was primarily a fishing, forestry, and farming community until the opening of the J. C. Van Horne Bridge to Campbellton in 1962. In 1969, the town was still incorporated as Cross Point, but changed to the French name in 1970. The town now is nearly fully integrated economically with the Campbellton area. Despite its economical ties and geographical proximity with Campbellton, the municipality observes Eastern Standard Time (UTC -5), which puts it one hour behind Campbellton.

== Geography ==
=== Climate ===
There is a weather station for Charlo, New Brunswick, near the municipality. Charlo has a humid continental climate (Köppen Dfb), bordering on a subarctic climate (Köppen Dfc).

Climate data for Pointe-à-la-Croix, Quebec (1991-2020)
Month	Jan	Feb	Mar	Apr	May	Jun	Jul	Aug	Sep	Oct	Nov	Dec	Year
Record high °C (°F)	14.2 (57.6)	14.4 (57.9)	22.6 (72.7)	28.8 (83.8)	33.5 (92.3)	36.7 (98.1)	35.8 (96.4)	34.4 (93.9)	33.4 (92.1)	27.8 (82.0)	23.0 (73.4)	12.2 (54.0)	36.7 (98.1)
Mean daily maximum °C (°F)	−7.0 (19.4)	−5.5 (22.1)	0.0 (32.0)	6.5 (43.7)	14.8 (58.6)	20.5 (68.9)	23.8 (74.8)	23.2 (73.8)	18.2 (64.8)	10.7 (51.3)	3.5 (38.3)	−3.0 (26.6)	8.8 (47.9)
Daily mean °C (°F)	−11.7 (10.9)	−10.6 (12.9)	−4.9 (23.2)	2.0 (35.6)	9.2 (48.6)	14.8 (58.6)	18.4 (65.1)	17.7 (63.9)	12.8 (55.0)	6.4 (43.5)	−0.1 (31.8)	−6.8 (19.8)	3.9 (39.1)
Mean daily minimum °C (°F)	−16.2 (2.8)	−15.6 (3.9)	−9.8 (14.4)	−2.5 (27.5)	3.4 (38.1)	9.2 (48.6)	13.0 (55.4)	12.1 (53.8)	7.3 (45.1)	2.1 (35.8)	−3.6 (25.5)	−10.6 (12.9)	−0.9 (30.3)
Record low °C (°F)	−36.5 (−33.7)	−32.2 (−26.0)	−30.1 (−22.2)	−20.3 (−4.5)	−8.3 (17.1)	−1.6 (29.1)	3.3 (37.9)	−0.1 (31.8)	−3.3 (26.1)	−9.4 (15.1)	−20.6 (−5.1)	−31.7 (−25.1)	−36.5 (−33.7)
Average precipitation mm (inches)	71.3 (2.81)	65.2 (2.57)	78.7 (3.10)	69.1 (2.72)	91.8 (3.61)	90.2 (3.55)	104.2 (4.10)	81.6 (3.21)	101.0 (3.98)	94.3 (3.71)	87.3 (3.44)	76.2 (3.00)	1,010.9 (39.8)
Average snowfall cm (inches)	88.7 (34.9)	75.3 (29.6)	64.4 (25.4)	31.7 (12.5)	3.8 (1.5)	0.0 (0.0)	0.0 (0.0)	0.0 (0.0)	0.0 (0.0)	3.1 (1.2)	34.3 (13.5)	63.6 (25.0)	364.9 (143.6)
Average precipitation days (≥ 0.2 mm)	13.9	10.9	11.1	11.2	16.5	15.4	17.7	16.8	16.1	16.0	14.9	14.7	175.2
Average snowy days (≥ 0.2 cm)	13.2	10.1	8.8	4.8	0.9	0.0	0.0	0.0	0.1	1.4	8.2	12.8	60.3
Source: Environment Canada

== Demographics ==
=== Population ===
Canada census – Pointe-à-la-Croix community profile

	2021	2016	2011
Population	1,344 (-4.5% from 2016)	1,391 (-4.5% from 2011)	1,472 (-7.2% from 2006)
Land area	390.73 km^{2} (150.86 sq mi)	390.96 km^{2} (150.95 sq mi)	394.39 km^{2} (152.27 sq mi)
Population density	3.4/km^{2} (8.8/sq mi)	3.6/km^{2} (9.3/sq mi)	3.7/km^{2} (9.6/sq mi)
Median age	51.2 (M: 50.4, F: 52.4)	49.2 (M: 48.9, F: 49.4)	47.0 (M: 47.5, F: 46.3)
Private dwellings	697 (total) 642 (occupied)	708 (total)	725 (total)
Median household income	$52,800	$38,101	$37,675

References: 2021 2016 2011

Historical Census Data - Pointe-à-la-Croix, Quebec

Year	Pop.	±%
1861	792	—
1871	635	−19.8%
1881	730	+15.0%
1891	808	+10.7%
1901	931	+15.2%
1911	993	+6.7%
1921	980	−1.3%
1931	1,133	+15.6%

Year	Pop.	±%
1941	1,614	+42.5%
1951	1,459	−9.6%
1956	1,308	−10.3%
1961	1,320	+0.9%
1966	1,434	+8.6%
1971	1,444	+0.7%
1976	1,515	+4.9%
1981	1,486	−1.9%

Year	Pop.	±%
1986	1,655	+11.4%
1991	1,541	−6.9%
1996	1,607	+4.3%
2001	1,513	−5.8%
2006	1,587	+4.9%
2011	1,472	−7.2%
2016	1,408	−4.3%
2021	1,344	−4.5%

2016 Population figure based on revised count.
Source: Statistics Canada

=== Language ===
Mother tongue (2021)

Language	Population	Pct (%)
French only	1,105	82.5%
English only	195	14.6%
English and French	30	2.2%
Non-official languages	10	0.7%
French and non-official language	0	0.0%

== See also ==
- Chaleur Bay
- Escuminac River
- List of anglophone communities in Quebec
- List of municipalities in Quebec
- Restigouche River
