= Belleisle, New Brunswick =

Coordinates: 45°43′48.6″N 65°43′19.6″W

Belleisle is an informal geographic region in the Canadian province of New Brunswick in the lower Saint John River valley.

Situated around Belleisle Bay, the area is predominantly agricultural and functions as a summer community for many cottage-goers from nearby Saint John. The region is divided between Kings County and Queens County.

== Communities in the region ==
Incorporated

- Village of Valley Waters (northern edge of village is considered within Belleisle)

Unincorporated

- Belleisle Creek
- Erbs Cove
- Hatfield Point
- Henderson Settlement
- Kars
- Keirsteadville
- Long Creek
- Long Point
- Midland
- Shannon
- Springfield
- Wickham

== Transportation ==
- New Brunswick Route 121
- New Brunswick Route 124
- New Brunswick Route 695
- New Brunswick Route 705
- New Brunswick Route 710
- New Brunswick Route 850
- New Brunswick Route 855
- New Brunswick Route 870
- New Brunswick Route 875

=== Ferries ===
- Evandale Ferry, a cable ferry that carries Route 124 across the Saint John River from Kars on the east bank to Evandale on the west bank.
- Hampstead Ferry, a cable ferry that carries Route 705 across the Saint John River from Wickham on the east bank to Hampstead on the west bank. This ferry service was cancelled in 2009 by the provincial government.
- Belleisle Bay Ferry, a cable ferry that crosses Belleisle Bay from Kars on the south bank to Long Point on the north bank.

== Schools ==
Belleisle Elementary School is where children go to attend Kindergarten to grade 5. Students attend Belleisle Regional High School for grade 6-12. The schools are located on opposite sides of the road (Route 124) in Springfield. The schools belong to School District 6.

== Summer camp ==
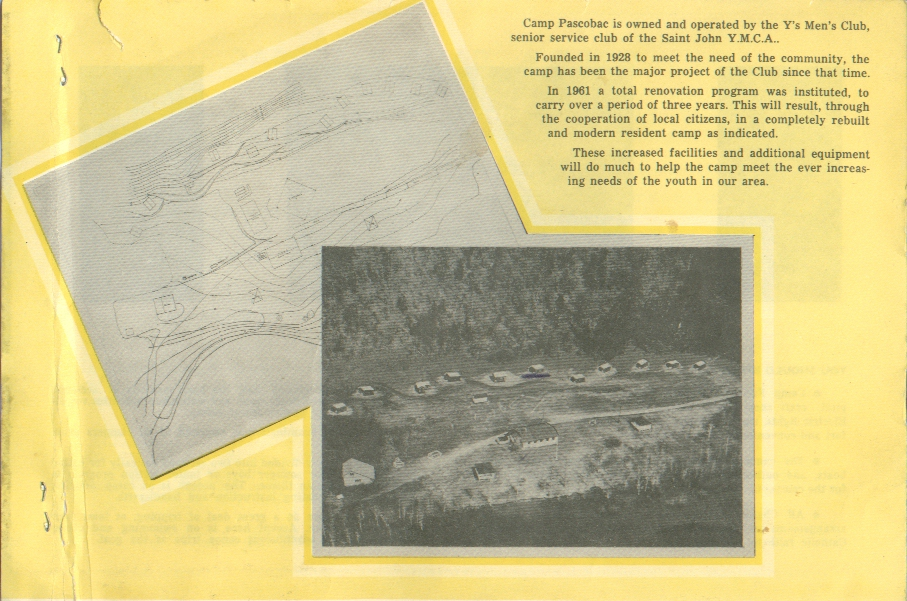
Camp Pascobac brochure 1965

Camp Pascobac is a resident camp for boys located on Belleisle Bay, founded in 1928. It provides instruction in boating and canoeing, craft development, fishing and other community activities. The camp is run by the local YMCA and runs for approximately four weeks in the summer.

== Notable people ==
- Duncan Hamilton McAlister (1872–1932), physician and political figure.
