= Springfield Parish, New Brunswick =

Springfield
- Parish
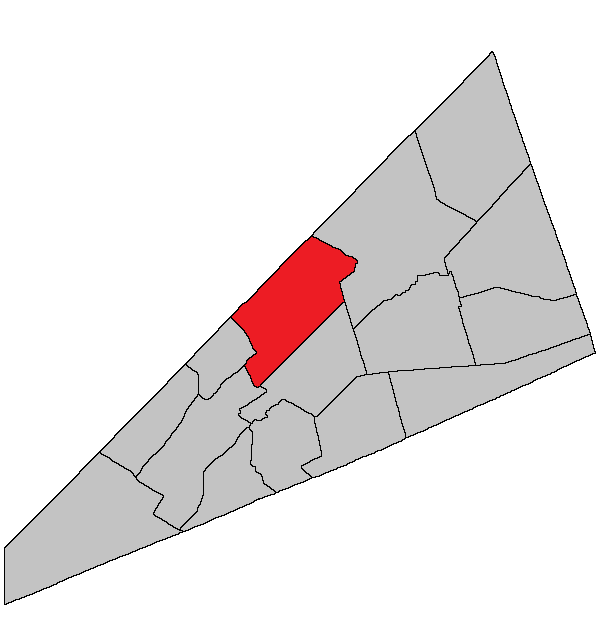
- Location within Kings County, New Brunswick.
- Coordinates: 45.84°N 64.59°W
- Country: Canada
- Province: New Brunswick
- County: Kings County
- Erected: 1786

Area
  - Land: 248.53 km^{2} (95.96 sq mi)

Population (2021)
  - Total: 1,641
  - Density: 6.6/km^{2} (17/sq mi)
  - Change 2016-2021: ▲7.6%
  - Dwellings: 797
- Time zone: UTC-4 (AST)
  - Summer (DST): UTC-3 (ADT)
- Figures do not include portion within the village of Norton

Springfield is a geographic parish in Kings County, New Brunswick, Canada.

Prior to the 2023 governance reform, it was divided for governance purposes between the village of Norton and the local service district of the parish of Norton, both of which were members of Kings Regional Service Commission (RSC8).

== Origin of name ==
The name was common in the Thirteen Colonies, now famously found at least once in every state of the United States.

Notable is that the names of Kings County's pre-1800 parishes all occur in both New Jersey and North Carolina.

== History ==
Springfield was erected in 1786 as one of the original parishes of the county.

In 1795 the boundaries were altered as part of the reorganisation of Kings County parishes.

In 1860 part of the parish was included in the newly erected Kars Parish.

In 1880 the boundary with Studholm was altered.

In 1896 the southern boundary was altered.

In 1899 the boundary was again altered.

== Boundaries ==
Springfield Parish is bounded:

- on the northwest by the Queens County line;
- on the northeast and east by a line beginning on the county line about 2.5 kilometres southwest of the Pearsonville Road, then southeasterly along the prolongation of the northeastern line of a grant southeast of Route 870 and southwest of the Collina Road, to a point about 1.6 kilometres past Route 870, then southwesterly along grant lines before a switchback easterly to a point about 450 metres northeast of the mouth of Snyder Brook, then southwesterly to the southeastern corner of a grant to Henry A. Scovil, about 150 metres northeasterly of a curve in the O'Neill Road, then southerly about 1.35 kilometres past Route 875 and about 450 metres north of Parleeville Road;
- on the southeast by a line running south 60º west, (Note: First described with a bearing in the Revised Statutes of 1952, when magnetic declination in the area was about 22.5º west of north. Before 1952 the Territorial Division Act noted that all bearings were by the magnet of the year they were first written; this bearing may actually date to the laying out of grants in 1786, when declination was about 14º west of north.) 65 chains (1.3 kilometres) inland of and parallel to the rear line of a tier of grants on the south side of Belleisle Bay, to point about 350 metres northeast of Route 845 and about 450 metres northwest of Rogers Road, on the southwestern line of a grant to Jeremiah Maybe;
- on the west by grant lines beginning on the southwestern line of Jeremiah Maybe, then northwesterly to the northwestern corner of the Maybe grant, then northeasterly about 275 metres to the southwestern corner of the William Roden grant on the southern side of Belleisle Bay, then northerly to Belleisle Bay and northeasterly across the bay to the Kars Parish line, about 450 metres east of the eastern end of Coreyvale Road, then northwesterly along three grant lines, with two short doglegs, to the Queens County line at a point about 900 metres northeast of the ends of Bond Road and McCrea Road.

== Communities ==
Communities at least partly within the parish; bold indicates an incorporated municipality

- Belleisle Creek
- Bull Moose Hill
- Case Settlement
- East Scotch Settlement
- Elm Brook
- Hatfield Point
- Irish Settlement
- Joliffs Brook
- Keirsteadville
- Long Point
- Lower Midland
- **Norton**
  - Midland
  - Upper Midland
- Northrups Corner
- Pascobac
- Searsville
- Springfield
- Stewarton
- The Grant
- Upper Belleisle
- West Scotch Settlement

== Bodies of water ==
Bodies of water (Note: Not including brooks, ponds or coves.) at least partly in the parish:

- Belleisle Creek
- Belleisle Bay
- Jack Lake

== Demographics ==
Parish population total does not include the village of Norton

=== Population ===
Population trend

Census	Population	Change (%)
2016	1,525	▼7.7%
2011	1,652	▲5.1%
2006	1,572	▲3.2%
2001	1,523	▲0.0%
1996		▼0.0%
1991		N/A

== Access Routes ==
Highways and numbered routes that run through the parish, including external routes that start or finish at the parish limits:

- **Highways**
  - none
- **Principal Routes**
  - Route 124
- Secondary Routes:
  - Route 695
  - Route 710
  - Route 850
  - Route 855
  - Route 870
  - Route 875
- External Routes:
  - None

== See also ==
- List of parishes in New Brunswick
