= List of crossings of the Saint John River =

The following bridges and ferries cross the Saint John River in the Canadian province of New Brunswick and U.S. state of Maine.

== Crossings ==
Name	Carries	Right (west) bank	Left (east) bank	Image
logging road (46.10067732960245, -69.89544113038775)	Seboomook Lake, Maine: N Branch Rd			
logging road (46.1495319127175, -69.88731216901594)	Seboomook Lake, Maine: 490 Rd			
logging road (46.17494185379136, -69.84561622959055)	Seboomook Lake, Maine: unnamed road			
logging road (46.28875732929241, -69.92917139710556)	Seboomook Lake, Maine: Baker Lake Road			
Sunset Bridge on the St. Juste Road (T10R17)	Seboomook Lake, Maine: St. Juste Road			
logging road (46.81042109811294, -69.57485639337969)	Northwest Aroostook, Maine: unnamed road			
Dickey Road	Allagash, Maine: Walker Brook Road	Allagash, Maine: SR 161	Allagash, Maine: Walker Brook Road	
Clair-Fort Kent Bridge	US 1	Fort Kent, Maine: US 1 / SR 161	Clair, New Brunswick: New Brunswick Route 205	
Edmundston–Madawaska Bridge	Bridge Street	Madawaska, Maine: US 1	Edmundston, New Brunswick: New Brunswick Route 120	
railway bridge	Maine Northern Railway (MNR Van Buren Subdivision)	Van Buren, Maine	Saint Leonard, New Brunswick	
Saint Leonard-Van Buren Bridge	Route 17	Van Buren, Maine: US 1	Saint Leonard, New Brunswick: New Brunswick Route 17	
	Route 2	Grand Falls: Route 2, New Brunswick Route 218	Grand Falls: Route 2, New Brunswick Route 108	
railway bridge	Multi-use trail (formerly Canadian Pacific Railway CP Edmundston Subdivision)	Grand Falls	Grand Falls	
	Route 130	Grand Falls: Route 130	Grand Falls: New Brunswick Route 108	
Brooks Bridge	Brooks Bridge Road	Limestone	New Brunswick Route 105	
Perth-Andover Bridge	Route 109	Andover: Route 109	Perth: New Brunswick Route 105, Route 109	
Florenceville Bridge	Route 130	Florenceville: Route 130, New Brunswick Route 110	East Florenceville: Route 130, New Brunswick Route 105	
Florenceville Bridge	Old Florenceville Bridge	Florenceville: Route 110	East Florenceville: New Brunswick Route 105	
Hugh John Flemming Bridge	Route 130	Hartland: Route 130, New Brunswick Route 105	Somerville: Route 130, New Brunswick Route 103	
Hartland Bridge	Hartland Bridge Road	Hartland: New Brunswick Route 105	Somerville: New Brunswick Route 103	
Grafton Bridge	Route 585	Woodstock: Route 103	Grafton: Route 105, Route 585	
Hawkshaw Bridge	Hawkshaw Bridge Road	Pokiok: New Brunswick Route 102	New Brunswick Route 105	
Westmorland Street Bridge	Westmorland Street	Fredericton: New Brunswick Route 101, New Brunswick Route 102	Fredericton: New Brunswick Route 105	
Fredericton Railway Bridge (now Bill Thorpe Walking Bridge)	Multi-use trail (formerly Canadian National Railway CN Nashwaak Subdivision)	Fredericton	South Devon	
Princess Margaret Bridge	Route 8	Fredericton: Route 8	Fredericton: Route 8, New Brunswick Route 10, New Brunswick Route 105	
Burton Bridge	Burton Bridge	Oromocto: New Brunswick Route 102	Maugerville: New Brunswick Route 105	
Saint John River High Level Crossing	Route 2	Arcadia: Route 2, New Brunswick Route 102	Canning: Route 2, New Brunswick Route 105	
Gagetown Ferry (cable ferry)		Arcadia: New Brunswick Route 102	Lower Jemseg: New Brunswick Route 715	
Evandale Ferry (cable ferry)		Evandale: New Brunswick Route 102	Route 124	
Westfield Ferry (cable ferry)		Westfield: New Brunswick Route 177	Hardings Point: New Brunswick Route 845	
Reversing Falls Railway Bridge	New Brunswick Southern Railway (NBSR McAdam Subdivision)	Lancaster	Saint John	
Reversing Falls Bridge	Route 100	Lancaster: Route 100	Saint John: Route 100	
Saint John Harbour Bridge	Route 1	Saint John: Route 1	Saint John: Route 1, New Brunswick Route 100	
Mactaquac Dam	Mactaquac Road (Route 102)	Lower Kingsclear / French Village: Ramps for Route 102	Mckeens Corner: Route 105	
