= Greenwich (disambiguation) =

Greenwich is a district of London, England, and home of the Greenwich meridian. The name is often used as a metonym for the prime meridian.

Greenwich may also refer to:

== Places ==
=== Canada ===
- Greenwich Parish, New Brunswick
  - Greenwich Hill, New Brunswick, an unincorporated community
- Greenwich, Nova Scotia, a rural community
- Greenwich, Prince Edward Island, an unincorporated community

=== England ===
- Royal Borough of Greenwich, a current local government district
- Greenwich Peninsula, also known as North Greenwich, an area of Greenwich, London
- Greenwich District (Metropolis), a former local government district, 1855–1900
- Metropolitan Borough of Greenwich, a former local government district, 1900–1965
- Greenwich (London County Council constituency), a former local government constituency, 1919–1965
- Greenwich (UK Parliament constituency), a former constituency, 1832–1997
- Greenwich, Ipswich, Suffolk, England, a suburb of Ipswich
- Greenwich, Tyne and Wear, historic area of Tyne and Wear
- Greenwich, Wiltshire

=== United States ===
- Greenwich, California, former name of Tehachapi, California
- Greenwich, Connecticut, a town
  - Greenwich (CDP), Connecticut, a census-designated place
- Greenwich, Illinois, an unincorporated community
- Greenwich, Kansas, an unincorporated community
- Greenwich, Massachusetts, a defunct town
- Greenwich Township, Cumberland County, New Jersey
  - Greenwich (CDP), Cumberland County, New Jersey
- Greenwich Township, Gloucester County, New Jersey
- Greenwich Township, Warren County, New Jersey
  - Greenwich (CDP), Warren County, New Jersey
- New York:
  - Greenwich Village, a neighborhood of Lower Manhattan, New York City
  - Greenwich (town), New York
  - Greenwich (village), New York, mostly within the town of Greenwich
- Greenwich, Ohio, a village
- Greenwich Township, Pennsylvania
- Greenwich, Utah, an unincorporated community
- Greenwich, Virginia, an unincorporated community
- Greenwich Bay (Rhode Island)

=== Elsewhere ===
- Greenwich Island, Antarctica, part of the South Shetland Islands
- Greenwich, New South Wales, Australia, a suburb of Sydney
- Greenwich Bay, at the mouth of the Yarra River in Newport, Victoria, Australia
- Greenwich, Maribor, Slovenia, a neighbourhood of Maribor and Hatchung
- 2830 Greenwich, an asteroid

== People ==
- Greenwich (surname)

== Schools ==
- University of Greenwich, London, United Kingdom
- Greenwich University, Karachi, Pakistan, a private research university
- Greenwich University (Norfolk Island), a defunct, controversial distance learning institution
- Greenwich Community College, Greenwich, London
- Ark Greenwich Free School, Greenwich, London, a coeducational secondary free school
- Greenwich High School, Connecticut, United States
- Greenwich Academy, an all-girls day school in Connecticut, United States

== Ships ==
- HMS Greenwich, six Royal Navy ships
- Greenwich (ship), various ships

== Transportation ==
- Greenwich Avenue, Greenwich Village, New York, United States
- Greenwich Street, Manhattan, New York, United States
- Greenwich station, London, England, a railway station
- Greenwich station (Metro-North), Greenwich, Connecticut, United States, a commuter rail stop

== Businesses ==
- Greenwich Pizza, a large pizza chain in the Philippines
- RBS Greenwich Capital, investment firm now known as RBS Securities
- Greenwich Entertainment, an American film company

== Other uses ==
- Baron Greenwich, two titles, one extinct in the Peerage of Great Britain, one extant in the Peerage of the United Kingdom
- Greenwich (soil), the official state soil of Delaware, United States
- Greenwich Mean Time, or GMT, the local time at the Royal Observatory in Greenwich, London; term used interchangeably with UTC as universal coordinated time
- "Greenwich" (The Architecture the Railways Built), a 2021 television episode

== See also ==
- Greenwitch, a fantasy novel by Susan Cooper
