= New Brunswick Route 705 =

Highway in New Brunswick, Canada

Route 705

Route information
- Maintained by New Brunswick Department of Transportation
- Length: 31.3 km (19.4 mi)

Major junctions
- South end: Route 124 in Kars
- North end: Route 710 in Henderson Settlement

Location
- Country: Canada
- Province: New Brunswick
- Major cities: Wickham, Shannon

Highway system
- Provincial highways in New Brunswick; Former routes
| ← Route 695 | → Route 710 |

Route 705 is a highway in New Brunswick, Canada that runs from an intersection of Route 124 in Kars to an intersection with Route 710 in Henderson Settlement, a distance of 31.3 kilometres. In 2009, the cable ferry service connecting Route 705 in Wickham to Route 102 in Hampstead was cancelled by the New Brunswick Department of Transportation.

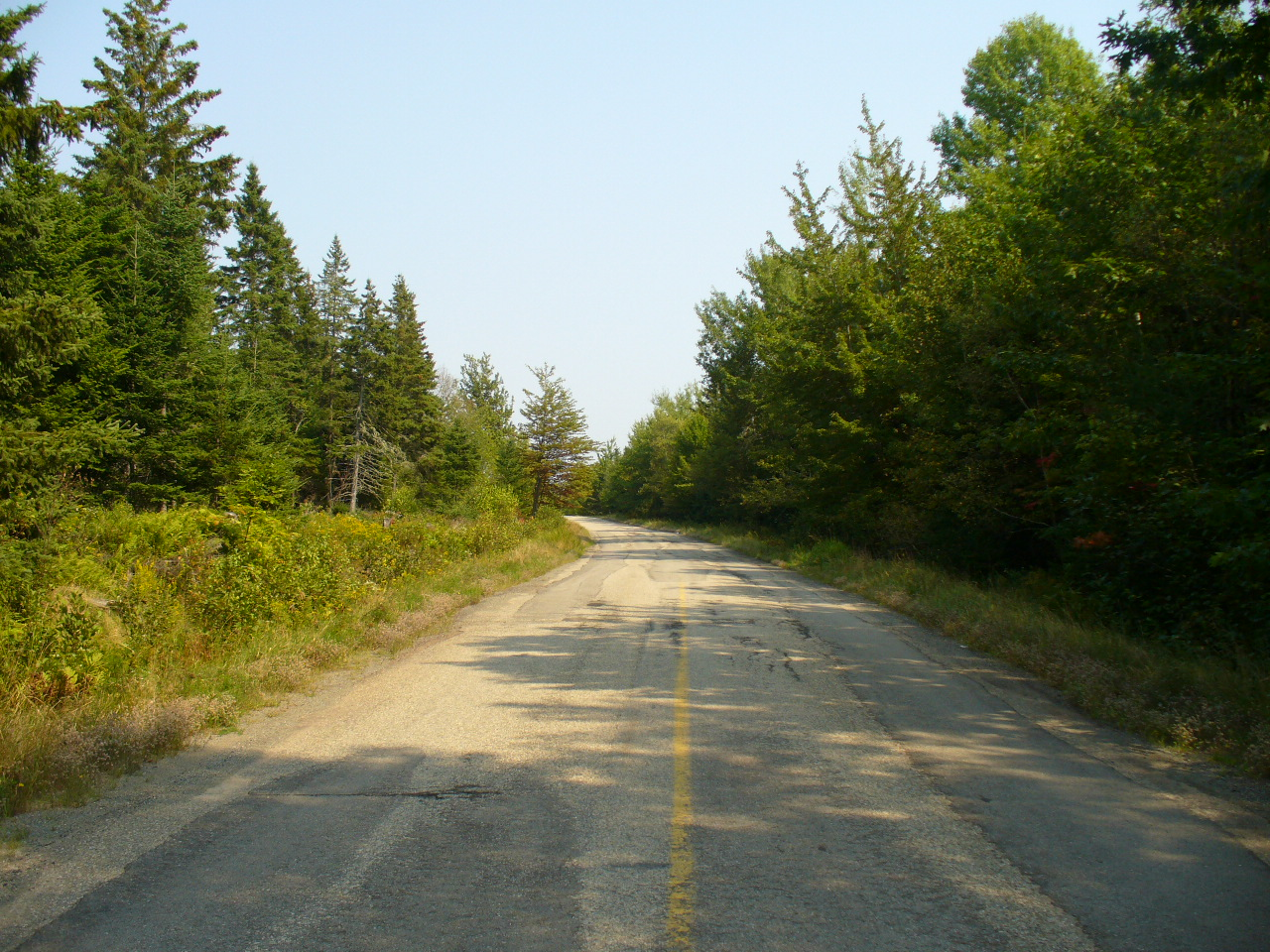
A typical stretch of Route 705 in Wickham

== See also ==
- List of New Brunswick provincial highways
