= Kars Parish, New Brunswick =

Kars
- Parish
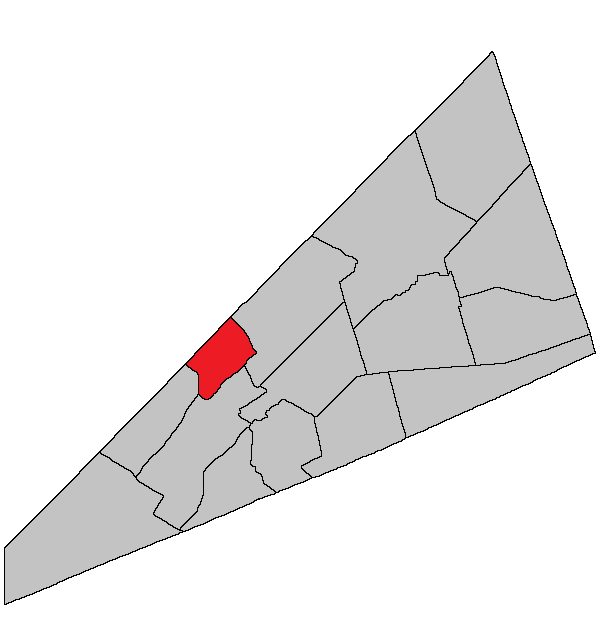
- Location within Kings County, New Brunswick.
- Coordinates: 45.84°N 64.59°W
- Country: Canada
- Province: New Brunswick
- County: Kings County
- Erected: 1860

Area
  - Land: 75.54 km^{2} (29.17 sq mi)

Population (2021)
  - Total: 377
  - Density: 5/km^{2} (13/sq mi)
  - Change 2016-2021: ▲16.0%
  - Dwellings: 291
- Time zone: UTC-4 (AST)
  - Summer (DST): UTC-3 (ADT)

Kars is a geographic parish in Kings County, New Brunswick, Canada.

Prior to the 2023 governance reform, it comprised the local service district of the parish of Kars, which was a member of Kings Regional Service Commission (RSC8).

== Origin of name ==
The parish was named for the Siege of Kars, last major operation of the Crimean War.

== History ==
Kars was erected in 1860 from Greenwich and Springfield Parishes.

In 1877 the islands in Belleisle Bay were added to Kars.

== Boundaries ==
Kars Parish is bounded:

- on the northwest by the Queens County line;
- on the east by the eastern line of three grants, beginning on the county line about 900 metres northeast of the ends of Bond Road and McCrea Road, then running southeasterly, with two short doglegs, past Vail Road to strike Belleisle Bay about 450 metres east of the eastern end of Coreyvale Road;
- on the south by Belleisle Bay;
- on the west by the Saint John River;
- including Hog Island and Pig Island near the mouth of Belleisle Bay and Ghost Island in the bay.

== Governance ==
Before 2023, the entire parish formed the local service district of the parish of Kars, established in 1968 to assess for fire protection. Recreational facilities were added in 2001 and non-fire related rescue in 2012. First aid and ambulance services (1972—2001) and community services (1986—2001) were formerly included.

== Communities ==
Communities at least partly within the parish.

- Beulah
- Earle Wharf
- Kars
- Lower Kars
- Tennants Cove

== Bodies of water ==
Bodies of water (Note: Not including brooks, ponds or coves.) at least partly in the parish.

- Belleisle Bay
- Saint John River

== Islands ==
Islands at least partly in the parish.

- Ghost Island
- Hog Island
- Pig Island

== Demographics ==
=== Population ===
Population trend

Census	Population	Change (%)
2016	325	▼20.1%
2011	407	▼4.0%
2006	424	▲22.9%
2001	345	Steady

=== Language ===
Mother tongue (2016)

Language	Population	Pct (%)
English only	310	96.9%
French only	0	0%
Both English and French	0	0%
Other languages	10	3.1%

== Access Routes ==
Highways and numbered routes that run through the parish, including external routes that start or finish at the parish limits:

- Highways
  - none
- Principal Routes
  - None
- Secondary Routes:
  - Route 124
  - Route 705
- External Routes:
  - None

== See also ==
- List of parishes in New Brunswick
