= Greenwich Parish, New Brunswick =

Coordinates: 45.32577°N 66.3243°W

Greenwich
- Parish
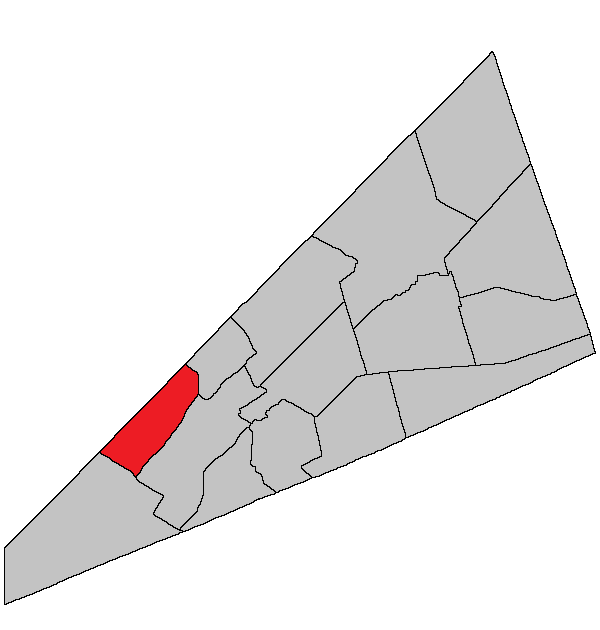
- Location within Kings County, New Brunswick.
- Country: Canada
- Province: New Brunswick
- County: Kings County
- Erected: 1795

Area
  - Land: 114.56 km^{2} (44.23 sq mi)

Population (2021)
  - Total: 1,126
  - Density: 9.8/km^{2} (25/sq mi)
  - Change 2016-2021: ▲6.4%
  - Dwellings: 579
- Time zone: UTC-4 (AST)
  - Summer (DST): UTC-3 (ADT)

Greenwich is a geographic parish in Kings County, New Brunswick, Canada. (Note: The Territorial Division Act divides the province into 152 parishes, the cities of Saint John and Fredericton, and one town of Grand Falls. The Interpretation Act clarifies that parishes include any local government within their borders.)

For governance purposes, the parish is part of the Fundy rural district, which is a member of the Fundy Regional Service Commission.

Prior to the 2023 governance reform, it comprised a single local service district, which was a member of the Fundy Regional Service Commission (FRSC).

The Census subdivision of the same name shares the parish's boundaries.

== Origin of name ==
The origin of the parish's name is uncertain, Greenwich being a placename in several of the Thirteen Colonies. Historian William F. Ganong listed Greenwich, England as a possible source, then later added Greenwich Village in New York and Greenwich Street in Hempstead, New York.

Notable is that the names of Kings County's pre-1800 parishes all occur in both New Jersey and North Carolina.

== History ==
Greenwich was erected in 1795 from Kingston Parish.

In 1860 the mainland east of the Saint John River was included in the newly erected parish of Kars.

== Boundaries ==
Greenwich Parish is bounded:

- on the northwest by the Queens County line;
- on the northeast by the Saint John River;
- on the southeast by the Long Reach of the Saint John River;
- on the southwest by a line beginning at the mouth of Devils Back Brook where the southwestern line of the grant to George Young strikes, then northwesterly along the grant line and its prolongation to the county line at a point about 300 metres northeasterly of the northern end of Mud Lake;
- including Catons Island, Grassy Island, Isle of Pines, Rocky Island, and Rush Island in Long Reach.

== Governance ==
The entire parish formed the local service district of the parish of Greenwich, established in 1976 to assess for fire protection and first aid and ambulance services. Recreational facilities were added to the assessment in 1995, with first aid and ambulance services removed at the same time.

== Communities ==
Communities at least partly within the parish; italics indicate a name no longer in official use

- Browns Corner
- Browns Flat
- Central Greenwich
- Cochrane Corner
- Days Corner
- Evandale
- Glenwood
- Grand View
- Greenwich Hill
- Johnson Croft
- Lynch Corner
- McPherson
- Oak Point
- Upper Greenwich
- Victoria Beach

== Bodies of water ==
Bodies of water (Note: Not including brooks, ponds or coves.) at least partly in the parish:

- Saint John River
- Jones Creek
- Marley Creek
- Nutter Creek
- more than fifteen officially named lakes

== Islands ==
Islands at least partly in the parish.

- Catons Island
- Grassy Island
- Isle of Pines
- Rocky Island
- Rush Island

== Demographics ==
=== Population ===
Population trend

Census	Population	Change (%)
2016	1,058	▲1.1%
2011	1,047	▲0.4%
2006	1,043	▲0.4%
2001	1,091	▼4.4%
1996	1,175	▼7.1%

=== Language ===
Mother tongue (2016)

Language	Population	Pct (%)
English only	1,030	97.2%
French only	15	1.4%
Both English and French	0	0%
Other languages	15	1.4%

== Access Routes ==
Highways and numbered routes that run through the parish, including external routes that start or finish at the parish limits:

- Highways
  - None
- Principal Routes
  - Route 102
  - Route 124
- None
- External Routes:
  - None

== See also ==
- List of parishes in New Brunswick
