= New Brunswick Route 102 =

Highway in New Brunswick

Route 102

Route information
- Maintained by New Brunswick Department of Transportation
- Length: 156.96 km (97.53 mi)
- Existed: 1965–present

Major junctions
- North end: Route 2 (TCH) in Pokiok
- Route 3 in Longs Creek; Route 101 in Fredericton; Route 2 (TCH) in Upper Gagetown; Route 124 in Evandale; Route 177 in Westfield
- South end: Route 7 in Westfield

Location
- Country: Canada
- Province: New Brunswick
- Major cities: Fredericton, Oromocto, Arcadia

Highway system
- Provincial highways in New Brunswick; Former routes
← Route 101	→ Route 103

Route 102 is a 156.96-kilometre-long (97.53 mi) provincial highway in the Canadian province of New Brunswick. The highway runs from an interchange with Route 2 in Pokiok, to an interchange with Route 7 in Grand Bay-Westfield.

== Route Description ==
The highway progresses along the Saint John River in Pokiok passing the Hawkshaw Bridge to Route 105 turning northeast as it passes through Hawkshaw, Barony, and Dumfries. The route then passes through Prince William crossing Joslin Creek Basin then entering Lower Prince William as it passes Kings Landing and an interchange with Route 635. The route continues past Longs Creek Passing the northern terminus Of The New Brunswick Route 3 Continuing Following the river past Woolastook Park and the Mactaquac Dam through Upper Kingsclear, Central Kingsclear, and Lower Kingsclear, as well as French Village and Island View as it enters Fredericton.

The route enters Fredericton in the neighbourhood of Silverwood continuing onto the Woodstock Road, then follows Brunswick Street or a riverfront parkway known as St. Anne's Point Drive (depending on direction) through the downtown area, leaving on Waterloo Row. Route 102 continues to follow the river along Lincoln Road, passing the Fredericton International Airport and reaching the town of Oromocto.

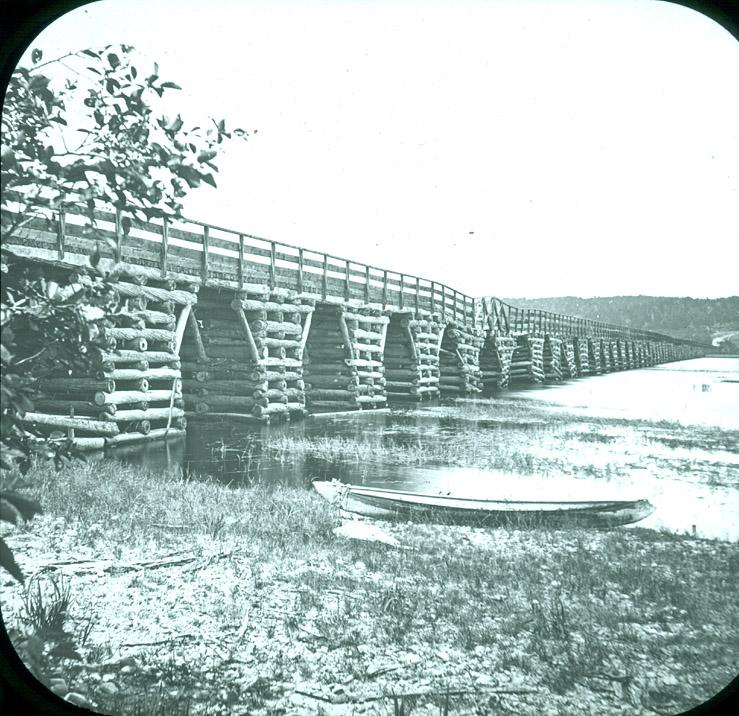
The crossing of the Nerepis River at Westfield was once a wooden structure (photo:1875).

Route 102 continues along the river passing the Burton Bridge through Burton, Upper Gagetown, Coytown, Mill Road, Arcadia, Upper Hampstead, and Pleasant Villa. Continuing past the Otnabog Lake, the route continues through Queenstown, Central Hampstead, and Hampstead. Evandale is the next destination, continuing through Upper Greenwich, Oak Point and Central Greenwich as well as Glenwood, Browns Flat, and Greenwich Hill.

Continuing along, the route continues into Lower Greenwich, Public Landing, Morrisdale, and Woodmans Point then crosses the Nerepis River to reach Grand Bay-Westfield on the west side. The route continues crossing Route 177 then finally ending at Route 7 at exit 80.

== Major Intersections ==
County	Location	km	mi	Destinations	Notes
York	Pokiok			Route 2 (Trans-Canada Highway) – Fredericton, Edmundston	Interchange, northern terminus
York	Pokiok			To Route 105 (Hacksaw Bridge) – Nackawic, Millville	
York	Prince William			Route 635 south (Route 635) to Route 2 – Lake George	Northern terminus of Route 635
York	Longs Creek			To Route 3 – St. Stephen, Edmundston	Separated roundabout
York	Lower Kingsclear			To Route 105 – French Village, Keswick Ridge	Interchange
York	Fredericton			Route 640 (Hanwell Road)	
Sunbury	Fredericton			To Route 7 / Route 2 – Edmundston, Saint John	To Route 7 exit 5
Sunbury	Richmond Estates			Route 655 – Waasis	
Sunbury	Oromocto			Route 2 west / Route 7 north – Fredericton	Interchange
Sunbury	Oromocto			Broad Road – Geary	Former Route 660
Sunbury	Burton			To Route 105	Turnoff for Burton Bridge
Queens	Coytown			Route 2 – Moncton, Fredericton	
Kings	Evandale			Route 124 – Norton	
Kings	Grand Bay-Westfield			Route 177	
Kings	Grand Bay-Westfield			Route 7 – Saint John, Fredericton	Interchange; southern terminus
1.000 mi = 1.609 km; 1.000 km = 0.621 mi: Incomplete access

== History ==
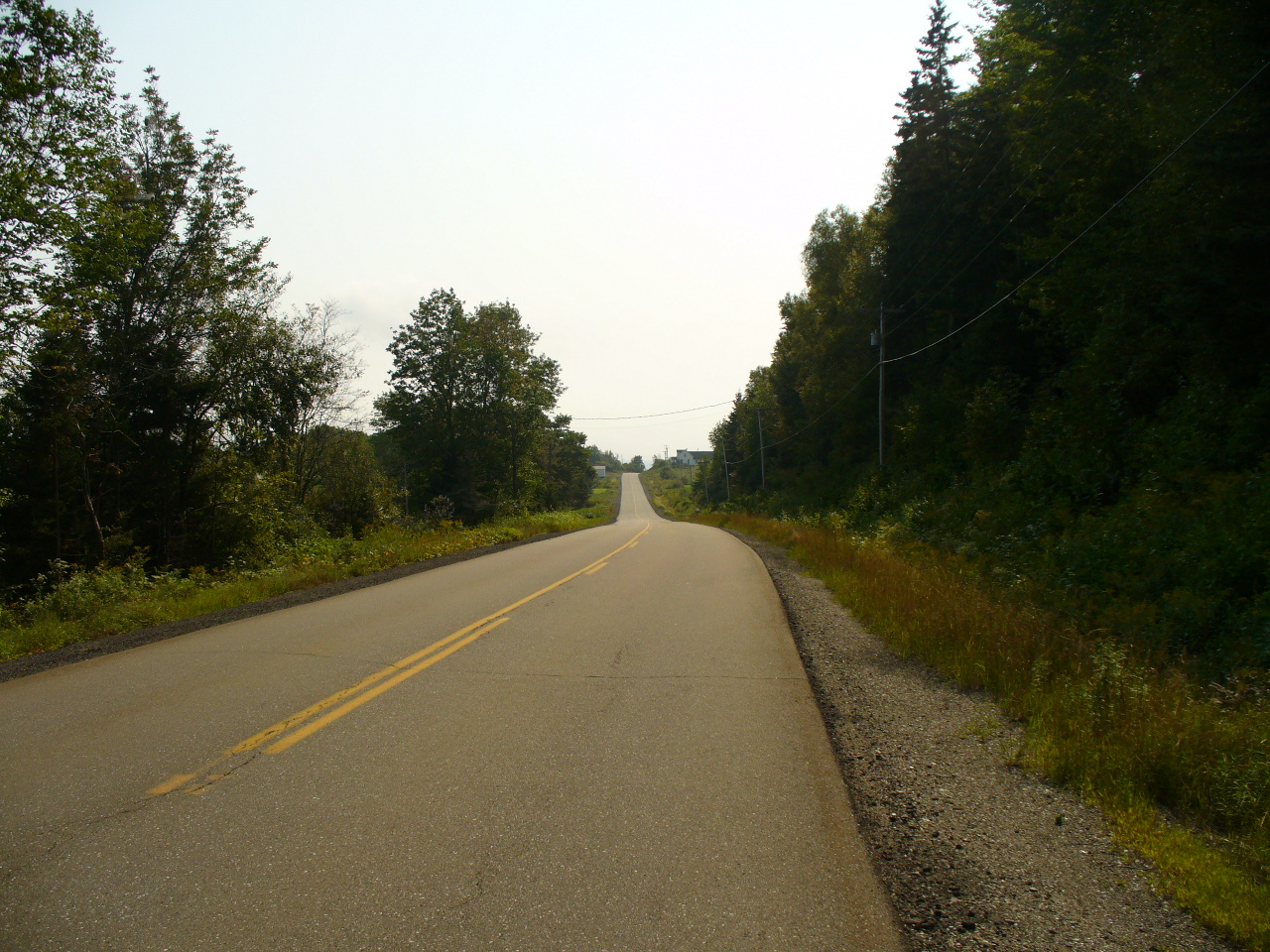
A stretch of Route 102 in Evandale, New Brunswick

The section from Pokiok to Fredericton, a former alignment of the Trans-Canada Highway (Route 2), became part of Route 102 in stages between 2000 and 2006, as sections of the new 4-lane Trans-Canada Highway were opened. This section begins at the interchange of Route 2 and Route 102 in Pokiok, following a newly built access road for a short distance to an interchange with the Pokiok Road (formerly part of Route 2).

An extension of the route was built in the 1980s to meet with Route 7. The Gagetown, Hampstead and Evandale ferries, small, toll-free, cable ferries connect Route 102 to the other side of the river.

As the River Road, the present-day Route 102 (then a part of Route 2) was the first road connecting Fredericton and Saint John to be paved, ahead of the Broad Road (the present-day Route 7). With the alignment of the Trans-Canada Highway bypassing Saint John, and the upgrades of the Broad Road in the 1950s taking most traffic off the River Road, its importance as a major traffic route diminished. The River Road became Route 102 in 1965.

== See also ==
- List of New Brunswick provincial highways
