= Greenwich (ship) =

Several ships have been named Greenwich:

- Greenwich was an East Indiaman launched in 1766 that made four voyages to India for the British East India Company. The Royal Navy purchased her in 1777, named her HMS Greenwich, intending to use her as a frigate during the American Revolutionary War. The navy then converted her to a storeship and receiving ship. She saw service in North American waters and off the English port of Sheerness between 1777 and 1783, but was ultimately declared surplus to requirements and sold into private hands at Deptford Dockyard.
- Greenwich was an American privateer that HMS Maidstone captured on 20 April 1778. The Royal Navy took her into service under her existing name. HMS Greenwich served for a little more than a year, particularly at Georgia, before she was burnt in May 1789.
- Greenwich (1800 ship) was launched on the Thames. Between 1800 and 1813 Samuel Enderby & Sons employed her as a whaler in the British Southern Whale Fishery, and she made four whaling voyages for them. In 1813 the United States Navy captured her in the Pacific and for about a year she served there as USS Greenwich. Her captors scuttled her in 1814.
- Greenwich was a ship launched at Hythe in 1809 that first appeared in Lloyd's Register in 1819 and then sailed as a whaler between 1819 and her loss in 1833. She was probably the former HMS Charybdis, launched at Hythe in 1809, that the Royal Navy had sold in 1819.
- Greenwich Light Vessel Automatic is a lightvessel in the English Channel.

== See also ==
- HMS Greenwich – one of six vessels of the Royal Navy
