= Springfield, New Brunswick =

Springfield, New Brunswick may refer to:

- Springfield, Carleton County, New Brunswick
- Springfield, Kings County, New Brunswick
- Springfield, York County, New Brunswick
- Springfield Parish, New Brunswick, a parish in Kings County
