= HMS Vindictive =

HMS Vindictive has been the name of several Royal Navy ships

- HM galley Vindictive was the six-gun galley Lee of the Georgia Navy that HMS Greenwich and HM galley Comet captured on the Savannah River in April 1779. The Royal Navy took Lee into service as Vindictive and sold her at Jamaica in 1786.
- HMS Vindictive was the Dutch navy's frigate Bellona launched at Rotterdam in 1786 that the Royal Navy captured at the Capitulation of Saldanha Bay in 1796 and broke up in 1816.
- HMS Vindictive (1813), a 74-gun third rate ship of the line launched in 1813 and sold in 1871.
- HMS Vindictive (1897), an Arrogant-class cruiser used in the Zeebrugge Raid.
- HMS Vindictive (1918), a Hawkins-class cruiser built in 1918 and converted to an aircraft carrier.
