= New Brunswick Route 870 =

Highway in New Brunswick, Canada

Coordinates: 45.743089°N 65.713348°W

Route 870

Route information
- Maintained by New Brunswick Department of Transportation
- Length: 20 km (12 mi)

Major junctions
- North end: Route 10 in Kierstead Mountain
- South end: Route 111 in Springfield

Location
- Country: Canada
- Province: New Brunswick

Highway system
- Provincial highways in New Brunswick; Former routes
| ← Route 865 | → Route 875 |

Route 870 is a 20.2-kilometre (12.6 mi) long north-east to south-west secondary highway in the south-western portion of New Brunswick, Canada.

== Route description ==
Most of the route is in Kings County.

The route's northeastern terminus is in Kierstead Mountain near Pleasant Ridge at Route 10 where it travels southeast through a mostly wooded area to Collina. From here, the route continues through Upper Belleisle and Belleisle Creek to the western terminus of Route 875. The route then passes through Elm Brook to its terminus in the community of Springfield at Route 124.
