= Browns Flat, New Brunswick =

Coordinates: 45.47265°N 66.137694°W

Location of Browns Flat in New Brunswick

Browns Flat is a Canadian rural community in Kings County, New Brunswick.

Located within Greenwich Parish, Browns Flat is situated along a stretch of the Long Reach section of the Saint John River and is accessed by Route 102. From Moncton/Sussex, Browns Flat can be accessed via Route 124 from Valley Waters. The Evandale Ferry runs 24 hours a day by the Department of Transportation at no fee to the user.

Browns Flat is home to:

- Greenwich Volunteer Fire Department. Founded 1974.
- Greenwich Recreation Center.
- The Rite Touch Convenience.(also known as Irving Oil)
- Donald's Excavation Service.
- Balemans Fruits and Vegetable Stand.
- Beulah Camp, a campground belonging to the Atlantic District of the Wesleyan Church.
- Catons Island, an island located in the Saint John River. It holds week-long summer camps for families (long weekend in August), kids and teenagers. It is owned by the Atlantic District of the Wesleyan Church.
- 3034 Blue Mountain Rangers Royal Canadian Army Cadet Corps.
- Blue Mountain Sports.
- Browns Flat Baptist Church.
- Wesley United Church.
- Galbraith Stables.

The nearest large community is the town of Grand Bay-Westfield, New Brunswick which is approximately a 10–15 minutes drive from Browns Flat.

== See also ==
- List of communities in New Brunswick
