= Leon G. Lebel =

American politician (1912–1975)

Member of the Maine House of Representatives
- In office 1959–1972

Personal details
- Born: April 10, 1912
- Died: November 24, 1975 (aged 63)
- Party: Democratic
- Occupation: Politician

Leon G. Lebel (April 10, 1912 – November 24, 1975) was an American politician from Maine. Lebel, a Democrat, served in the Maine House of Representatives from 1959 to 1972. He was a resident of Van Buren, Maine.
