= Hampstead Parish, New Brunswick =

Hampstead
- Parish
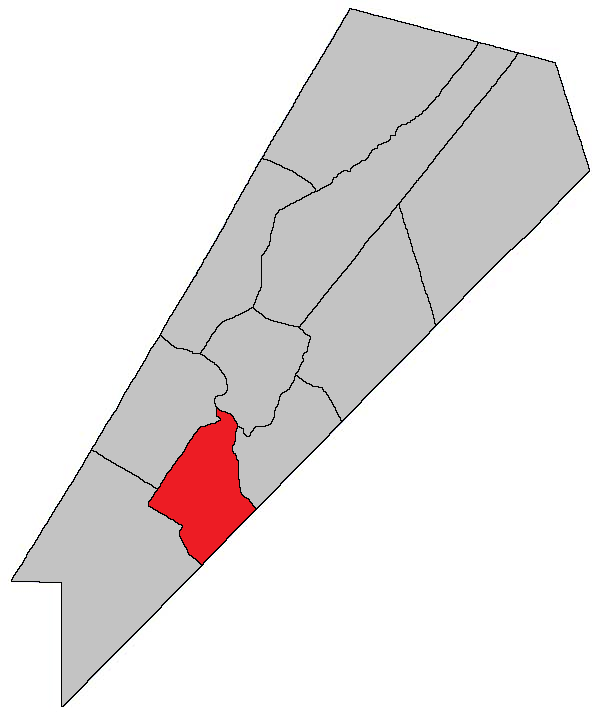
- Location within Queens County, New Brunswick.
- Coordinates: 45.84°N 64.59°W
- Country: Canada
- Province: New Brunswick
- County: Queens County
- Erected: 1786

Area
  - Land: 212.39 km^{2} (82.00 sq mi)

Population (2021)
  - Total: 288
  - Density: 1.4/km^{2} (3.6/sq mi)
  - Change 2016-2021: ▲4.0%
  - Dwellings: 167
- Time zone: UTC-4 (AST)
  - Summer (DST): UTC-3 (ADT)

Hampstead is a geographic parish in Queens County, New Brunswick, Canada.

Prior to the 2023 governance reform, for governance purposes it was divided between CFB Gagetown and the local service district of Hampstead, which was a member of Capital Region Service Commission (RSC11). The Saint John River islands are not part of the local service district.

== Origin of name ==
The parish was probably named for Hempstead, New York, source of some of the Loyalist settlers of the parish.

== History ==
Hampstead was erected in 1786 as one of the county's original parishes.

In 1838 the rear of the parish was included in the newly erected Petersville Parish.

In 1895 the eastern half of Long Island was transferred to Wickham Parish.

New Brunswick's last surviving African Canadian community, Elm Hill, was established here in 1806.

== Boundaries ==
Hampstead Parish is bounded

- on the east by the Saint John River;
- on the southeast by the Kings County line;
- on the southwest and northwest within CFB Gagetown by a line at the end of Olinville Road and running (Note: Roads still appear on cadastral maps but not in highway mapbooks; because the old roads and grants are used in the Territorial Division Act they're used here.) along Yorkshire Road to the northwestern line of a grant to John Short, east of the junction with the road to Vincent, then northeasterly and northwesterly along grants belonging to Sylvanus Haviland, James Corbett, and Henry Appleby to the Lawfield Road, then northeasterly along Lawfield Road to the southernmost corner of a grant to Thomas T. Hewlett at the corner of Kerr Road, meeting a line running south 52º west, (Note: By the magnet of 1850, when declination at the starting point was about 18º 20' west of north. The Territorial Division Act clause referring to magnetic direction bearings was omitted in the 1952 and 1973 Revised Statutes.) from the southwestern corner of a grant to Nathaniel Jarvis, then following the line out of CFB Gagetown;
- on the north by the southern line of the Jarvis grant, part of which forms the southern boundary of the village of Gagetown;
- including Spoon Island, Upper Musquash Island, and the western half of Long Island.

== Communities ==
Communities at least partly within the parish; bold indicates an incorporated municipality; italics indicate a community expropriated for CFB Gagetown

- Central Hampstead
- Dunns Corner
- Elm Hill
- Hamilton Mountain
- Hampstead
- Hibernia
- Inchby
- Lower Gagetown
- McAlpines
- New Jerusalem
- Pleasant Villa
- Quarries
- Queenstown
- Summer Hill

== Bodies of water ==
Bodies of water (Note: Not including brooks, ponds or coves.) at least partly in the parish:

- Little River
- Saint John River
  - Lawson Passage
- Palmer Creek
- Fanning Lake
- Rabbit Lake
- Long Island Lake
- Otnabog Lake

== Islands ==
Islands in the parish:

- Long Island
- Spoon Island
- Upper Musquash Island

== Other notable places ==
Parks, historic sites, and other noteworthy places in the parish.

- CFB Gagetown

== Demographics ==
=== Population ===
Population trend, 2021

Census	Population	Change (%)
2021	288	▲4%
2016	277	▼5.8%
2011	294	▲5.7%
2006	278	▼10.9%
2001	312	▲5.4%
1996	296	▼12.7%
1991	339	N/A

=== Language ===
Mother tongue language (2021)2021

Language	Population	Pct (%)
French only	15	5.2%
English only	265	91.4%
Other languages	10	3.4%

== Access Routes ==
Highways and numbered routes that run through the parish, including external routes that start or finish at the parish limits:

- **Highways**
  - none
- **Principal Routes**
  - None
- Secondary Routes:
  - Route 102
- External Routes:
  - None

== See also ==
- List of parishes in New Brunswick
