= Van Buren High School =

Van Buren High School may refer to several schools in the United States:

- Van Buren High School (Van Buren, Arkansas)
- Van Buren High School, Van Buren, Indiana
- Van Buren High School (Van Buren, Maine)
- Van Buren High School (Missouri) in Van Buren, Missouri
- Martin Van Buren High School in Queens Village, New York City
- Van Buren High School (Ohio) in Van Buren, Ohio
