= Catons Island =

Island in New Brunswick, Canada

- Interactive map of Catons Island

Geography
- Location: Saint John River
- Coordinates: 45°28′45.194″N 66°6′35.660″W
- Area: 0.53 km^{2} (0.20 sq mi)

Administration
- Canada
- Province: New Brunswick
- County: Kings
- Parish: Greenwich

Catons Island is an island on the Saint John River in the Greenwich Parish of Kings County, New Brunswick, Canada. Located near Browns Flat, the island was first settled around 1610–1611 and used as a fur trading post by Robert Gravé Du Pont, the son of French navigator François Gravé Du Pont and affiliate of Samuel de Champlain.

The Wolastoqiyik name for the island was identified by cartographer William Francis Ganong as "Ah-men-henit-murs-eek-wol". It is currently used as a Christian campground affiliated with the Wesleyan Church.

== Description ==
Catons Island is located in the Long Reach in the Saint John River. It has an area of 131 acres, or about 0.53 square kilometres. According to Howard Robinson, a historical owner of the island, its forest contains 39 types of trees, multiple of which are not native.

The Wolastoqiyik name for the island was identified by cartographer William Francis Ganong as "Ah-men-henit-murs-eek-wol". Another early name attributed to the island is Emenenic, which has been translated to both "Isle of Prayer" and "meeting place".

It is currently used as a Christian campground affiliated with the Wesleyan Church.

== History ==
According to historian George MacBeath in the Winter 1962 New Brunswick Museum History Bulletin, Catons Island was first settled in 1610 as a fur trading post by Robert Gravé Du Pont, the son of French navigator François Gravé Du Pont and affiliate of Samuel de Champlain. In October 1611, Holy Mass was celebrated on the island, in what is recorded as the first known religious service held in what is now New Brunswick.

A marker was placed on the island in 1911 to commemorate its landing.

== Works cited ==
- Fraser, James Andrew (1967). A History of Caton's Island. Miramichi Historical Society.
