= HMS Greenwich =

Six ships of the Royal Navy have borne the name HMS Greenwich after the town of Greenwich, now part of London:

- HMS Greenwich (1666) was a 54-gun fourth rate launched in 1666. She was rebuilt in 1699 and again in 1730, before being wrecked in 1744.
- HMS Greenwich (1747) was a 50-gun fourth rate launched in 1747 and captured by the French in 1757.
- HMS Greenwich (1777) was a 26-gun East Indiaman purchased in 1777 and sold in 1783.
- HMS Greenwich (1778) was a 12-gun sloop captured from the Americans in 1778 and wrecked in 1779.
- HMS Greenwich was previously HMS Rodney, a 74-gun third rate launched in 1809. She was renamed Greenwich in 1827 and rearmed to 50 guns before being sold in 1836.
- HMS Greenwich (1915) was a Greek merchant ship, converted on the stocks to a depot ship and launched in 1915. In 1939 she was converted into a wireless telegraphy ship at Henry Robb shipyard in Leith. She was sold into mercantile service in 1946 and renamed Hembury.
