= New Brunswick Route 177 =

Highway in New Brunswick

Route 177

Route information
- Maintained by New Brunswick Department of Transportation
- Length: 19.6 km (12.2 mi)

Major junctions
- South end: Route 7 in Saint John
- Route 102 in Lingley
- North end: Route 7 in Welsford

Location
- Country: Canada
- Province: New Brunswick
- Major cities: Saint John

Highway system
- Provincial highways in New Brunswick; Former routes
| ← Route 176 | → Route 180 |

Route 177 is a provincial highway in the southwestern portion of the Canadian province of New Brunswick. Its main purpose is to serve the town of Grand Bay-Westfield. Route 177 is a former alignment of Route 7 and is 19.6 kilometres long.

The southern end of Route 177 is at Route 7 exit 90 at Crane Mountain in the city of Saint John. The road runs northeast to the Westfield Road, the original road built along the Saint John River. Route 177 is known as River Valley Drive in the former town of Grand Bay, and Nerepis Road in the former village of Westfield. In these sections, those street names are used for civic addresses. A small portion of the road that is in the Saint John city limits is officially called Westfield Road. The road serves the Westfield ferry to the Kingston Peninsula and intersects Route 102 in the centre of Westfield. This was Route 177's northern terminus; however, since the construction of the Welsford Bypass, the route continues north on Nerepis Road through Sagwa, and Welsford. The route's northern terminus ends at Route 7 at exit 71. Thereafter, the road continues as Eagle Rock Road (a former alignment of Route 7) to Route 101 and Route 7 at exit 63.

== History ==
- The road was part of Route 7 until the Grand Bay-Westfield areas were bypassed in the mid-1980s.
- As of October 2013, the route's northern terminus ended at Route 7 exit 71 near Welsford.

== See also ==
- List of New Brunswick provincial highways
