= Elm Hill, New Brunswick =

Elm Hill
- Unincorporated community
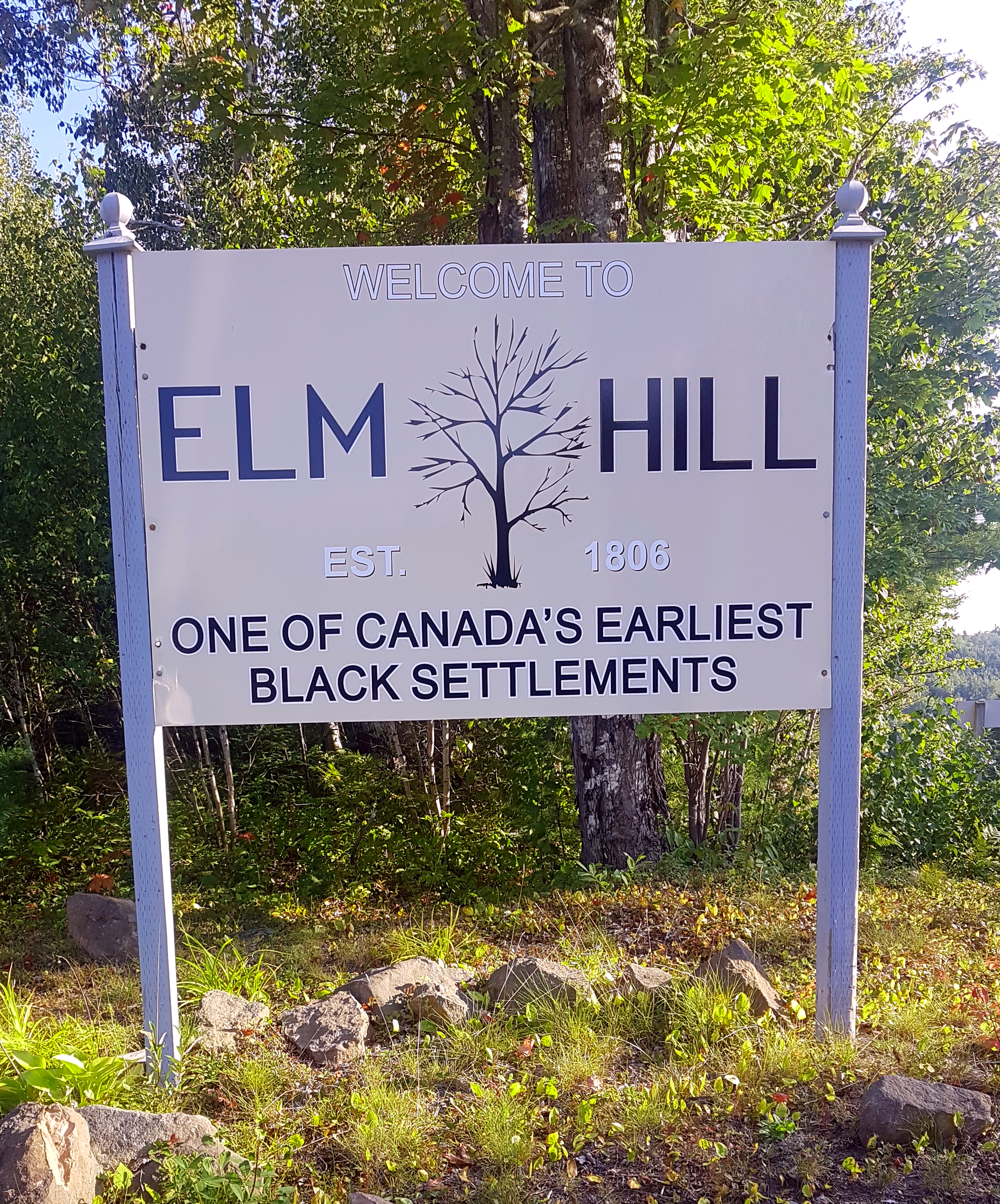
- Elm Hill entrance sign in September, 2018

- Location of Elm Hill in New Brunswick
- Coordinates: 45.62°N 66.08°W
- Country: Canada
- Province: New Brunswick
- County: Queens
- Parish: Hampstead

Population (2016)
  - Total: 25
- Time zone: UTC-4 (AST)
  - Summer (DST): UTC-3 (ADT)
- Area code: 506

Elm Hill is a community in Hampstead Parish, New Brunswick, Canada. It is significant as the last surviving Black Canadian community in New Brunswick.

== History ==
Historical populations
Year	Pop.	±%
1871	100	—
1901	131	+31.0%
1921	111	−15.3%
1931	110	−0.9%
1951	65	−40.9%
1961	75	+15.4%
1991	35	−53.3%
2001	30	−14.3%
2011	30	+0.0%
2016	25	−16.7%
Source: Statistics Canada (Note: Statistics Canada and Housing New Brunswick studies of the area.)

Elm Hill was established by black Loyalists from Virginia in 1806, as one of Canada's earliest black communities. Throughout the 1800s, the community enjoyed a period of relative prosperity, as its remoteness allowed the residents to develop their economy free from outside interference. Located on the St. John River between Saint John and Fredericton, Elm Hill functioned well while the steamers plied the river, stopping there to transport people and products. Once the railroad replaced the river as the highway, however, the community's isolation worked against it. Elm Hill had been a self-sufficient farming community until the 1960s, when many area residents moved to urban areas for better opportunities. Those remaining were not able to keep up the farms, and decline set in. Elm Hill once supported a post office, a store, two churches (Pentecostal and Baptist), and a school although those are all now closed.

As of the 2016 census, the area is still home to 25 residents, many involved in small-scale farming operations or employed in government jobs.

The community was previously known as Otnabog (1854–1893), Upper Otnabog (1876–1911), and Pleasant Villa (1911–1933), before the name was changed back to Elm Hill.

== See also ==
- List of communities in New Brunswick
- Black Nova Scotians
- Black Loyalists
- Black Canadians in New Brunswick
