= Shirley Jackson Case =

Canadian theologian (1872–1947)

The Reverend Shirley Jackson Case
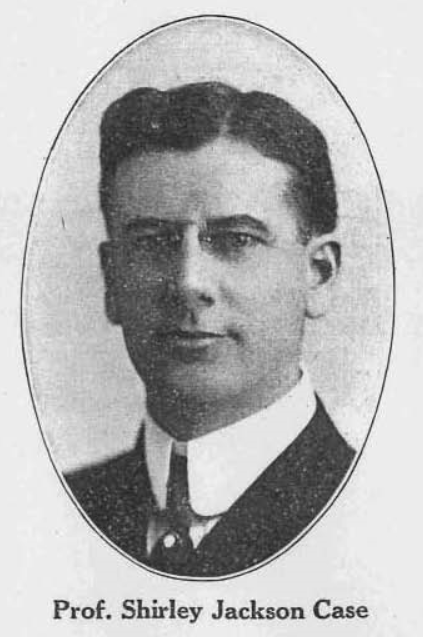
- Born: September 28, 1872; Hatfield Point, New Brunswick, Canada
- Died: December 5, 1947 (aged 75); Lakeland, Florida, US

Ecclesiastical career
- Religion: Christianity (Baptist)

Academic background
- Education: Acadia University; Yale University
- Influences: Adolf von Harnack; Albrecht Ritschl

Academic work
- Discipline: History; theology
- Sub-discipline: Ecclesiastical history
- School or tradition: Theological liberalism
- Institutions: University of Chicago; Florida Southern College

Shirley Jackson Case (1872–1947) was a historian of early Christianity, and a liberal theologian. He served as dean of the University of Chicago Divinity School.

== Biography ==
Case was born on September 28, 1872, in Hatfield Point, New Brunswick. He received a BA (1893) and MA (1896) in mathematics from Acadia University. He taught mathematics at the New Hampton Library Institute. In 1904, he obtained a Bachelor of Divinity degree from Yale Divinity School and a Doctor of Philosophy degree in 1908. He was professor of New Testament literature and interpretation at University of Chicago Divinity School until 1925. In 1924, he served as president of the American Society of Church History and, in 1926, served as president of the Society of Biblical Literature and Exegesis.

Case is known for his research into the person of Jesus, who he argued was a historical person.

He edited The American Journal of Theology and its successor The Journal of Religion. Case considered himself a historian of Christianity. He was drawn to liberal theology. He was convinced that Jesus was an historical person and criticized the arguments of Christ myth theory proponents.

He died on December 5, 1947, in Lakeland, Florida.

== Selected publications ==
Books

- The Historicity of Jesus: A Criticism of the Contention that Jesus Never Lived, a Statement of the Evidence for His Existence, an Estimate of His Relation to Christianity (1912)
- The Evolution of Early Christianity: A Genetic Study of First-Century Christianity in Relation to Its Religious Environment (1914)
- The Revelation of John: A Historical Interpretation (1919)
- The Social Origins of Christianity (1923)
- Jesus: A New Biography (1927)
- Experience With the Supernatural in Early Christian Times (1929)
- The Social Triumph of the Ancient Church (1933)
- Makers of Christianity: From Jesus to Charlemagne (1934)
- Christianity in a Changing World (1941)
- The Christian Philosophy of History (1943)
- The Origins of Christian Supernaturalism (1946)

Papers

- Case, Shirley Jackson. (1910). Is Jesus a Historical Character? Evidence for an Affirmative Opinion. The American Journal of Theology 15 (2): 205–227.
- Case, Shirley Jackson. (1910). The Missionary Idea in Early Christianity. The Biblical World 36 (2): 113–125.
- Case, Shirley Jackson. (1911). Jesus' Historicity: A Statement of the Problem. The American Journal of Theology 15 (2): 265–268.
- Case, Shirley Jackson. (1911). Recent Books on the Question of Jesus' Existence. The American Journal of Theology 15 (4): 626–628.
- Case, Shirley Jackson. (1911). The Historicity of Jesus an Estimate of the Negative Argument. The American Journal of Theology 15 (1): 20–42.
- Case, Shirley Jackson. (1913). The Problem of Christianity's Essence. The American Journal of Theology 17 (4): 541–562.
- Case, Shirley Jackson. (1920). Reviewed Work: The Jesus Problem. A Restatement of the Myth Theory by J. M. Robertson. The Harvard Theological Review 13 (3): 295–296.
- Case, Shirley Jackson. (1921). The Historical Study of Religion. The Journal of Religion 1 (1): 1–17.

== See also ==
- Free Will Baptist

Professional and academic associations
Preceded by Julius A. Bewer	President of the Society of Biblical; Literature and Exegesis; 1926	Succeeded by Irving F. Wood
