= Wickham, New Brunswick =

Coordinates: 45.645°N 66.072°W

Wickham is a rural community located in Wickham Parish in Queens County, New Brunswick, Canada. It is located on the shore of the Saint John River immediately next to the community of Kars. It was formerly connected to Hampstead via the Hampstead Ferry, however this ferry service was discontinued by the provincial government in 2009.
