= Wickham Parish, New Brunswick =

Coordinates: 45.7054°N 65.9886°W

Wickham
- Parish
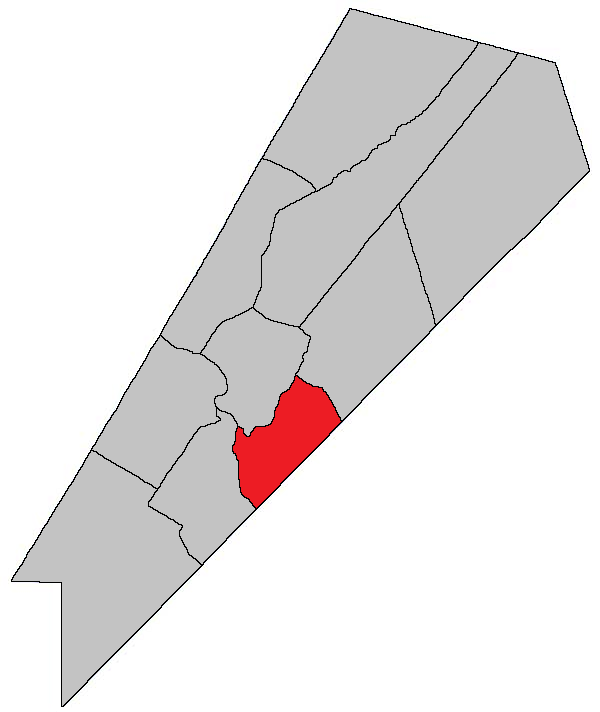
- Location within Queens County, New Brunswick.
- Country: Canada
- Province: New Brunswick
- County: Queens County
- Erected: 1786

Area
  - Land: 160.54 km^{2} (61.98 sq mi)

Population (2021)
  - Total: 409
  - Density: 2.5/km^{2} (6.5/sq mi)
  - Change 2016-2021: ▼4.2%
  - Dwellings: 383
- Time zone: UTC-4 (AST)
  - Summer (DST): UTC-3 (ADT)
- Figures do not include portion within the village of Cambridge-Narrows

Wickham is a geographic parish in Queens County, New Brunswick, Canada.

Prior to the 2023 governance reform, for governance purposes it was divided between the village of Cambridge-Narrows and the local service district of the parish of Wickham, both of which were members of Kings Regional Service Commission (RSC8).

== Origin of name ==
The parish may have been named for Wickham, Hampshire, near the birthplace of William Spry. Among Spry's numerous pre-Loyalist grants was one of 3000 acres in the Wickham area in 1774.

== History ==
Wickham was erected in 1786 as one of the county's original parish. The parish surrounded Washademoak Lake and extended past the county line.

In 1839 the northeastern part of Wickham was erected as Johnston Parish.

In 1852 part of Wickham was included in the newly erected Cambridge Parish.

In 1895 the eastern half of Long Island was transferred from Hampstead Parish.

== Boundaries ==
Wickham Parish is bounded:

- on the east by a line beginning on Washademoak lake at the end of Watson Road in Cambridge-Narrows, then running southeasterly along Watson Road and Route 695 to the Kings County line;
- on the southeast by the Kings County line;
- on the west by the Saint John River;
- on the northwest by Washademoak Lake;
- including Hog Island, Killaboy Island, Lower Musquash Island, and the eastern half of Long Island.

== Communities ==
Communities at least partly within the parish; bold indicates an incorporated municipality

- Belyeas Cove
- Big Cove
- **Cambridge-Narrows**
- Carpenter
- Crafts Cove
- Henderson Settlement
- London Settlement
- MacDonalds Point
- Shannon
- Wickham

== Bodies of water ==
Bodies of water (Note: Not including brooks, ponds or coves.) at least partly in the parish:

- Saint John River
- Colwells Creek
- Washademoak Creek
- Cranberry Lake
- Long Island Lake
- Musquash Lake
- Washademoak Lake

== Islands ==
Islands in the parish:

- Birch Island
- Hog Island
- Killaboy Island
- Long Island
- Lower Musquash Island
- Pine Island

== Other notable places ==
Parks, historic sites, and other noteworthy places in the parish.

- Hampstead Ferry
- The Bluff

== Demographics ==
Parish population total does not include portion within Cambridge-Narrows

=== Population ===
Population trend

Census	Population	Change (%)
2016	427	▲0.2%
2011	426	▼7.4%
2006	460	▲14.2%
2001	402	

=== Language ===
Mother tongue (2016)

Language	Population	Pct (%)
English only	410	95.3%
French only	5	1.2%
Both English and French	5	1.2%
Other languages	10	2.3%

== Access Routes ==
Highways and numbered routes that run through the parish, including external routes that start or finish at the parish limits:

- **Highways**
  - None
- **Principal Routes**
  - None
- Secondary Routes:
  - Route 705
  - Route 710
- External Routes:
  - None

== See also ==
- List of parishes in New Brunswick
