= Paul André Albert =

American metallurgist (1926–2019)

- Born: April 14, 1926; Van Buren, Maine, U.S.
- Died: October 26, 2019 (aged 93)
- Education: University of Maine (BS); New York University (ScD)
- Occupation: Metallurgist
- Spouse: Jeanne Kachmar (m. 1955)
- Children: 8
- Scientific career
- Fields: Metallurgy

Paul André Albert (April 14, 1926 – October 26, 2019) was an American metallurgist. In the 1970s and 1980s, he helped to develop the class of doped cobalt-chrome alloys still in use in the manufacture of computer hard disks.

Albert was born in Van Buren, Maine, to Doctor Armand Albert and Marie Lussier Albert and is a direct descendant of Canadian pioneer Pierre Boucher. Albert earned a BS in physics from the University of Maine and an ScD in metallurgy from New York University. During his career at Westinghouse in Pittsburgh, Pennsylvania, and then at IBM in Poughkeepsie, New York, in Essex Junction, Vermont, and in San Jose, California, Albert co-authored several other patents on the production of anisotropic magnetic films and the means of recording and reading data in them. Albert also contributed to early work on high-density perpendicular recording.

After retiring from IBM in 1982, Albert helped to develop research alloys for disk drive manufacturers such as IBM, Western Digital and Seagate. In 1985, Albert Consulting was incorporated and began arc melting PVD research alloys under the name ACI Alloys. During the 1990s, researchers at ACI Alloys expanded to other thin film markets by developing techniques for the casting of sputtering targets made of fully reacted transition metal alloys such as gallium nickel and germanium antimony telluride as well as high-purity arc-cast precious metal targets and evaporation materials.

Albert died on October 26, 2019, at the age of 93. He was remembered as having said his "greatest love by far was his family."

Albert was survived by his wife, Jeanne (Kachmar) Albert, whom he married in 1955; his eight children; twenty grandchildren; and two great-grandchildren.
