= Gagetown Ferry =

Cable ferry in New Brunswick, Canada

Coordinates: 45.768481°N 66.136279°W

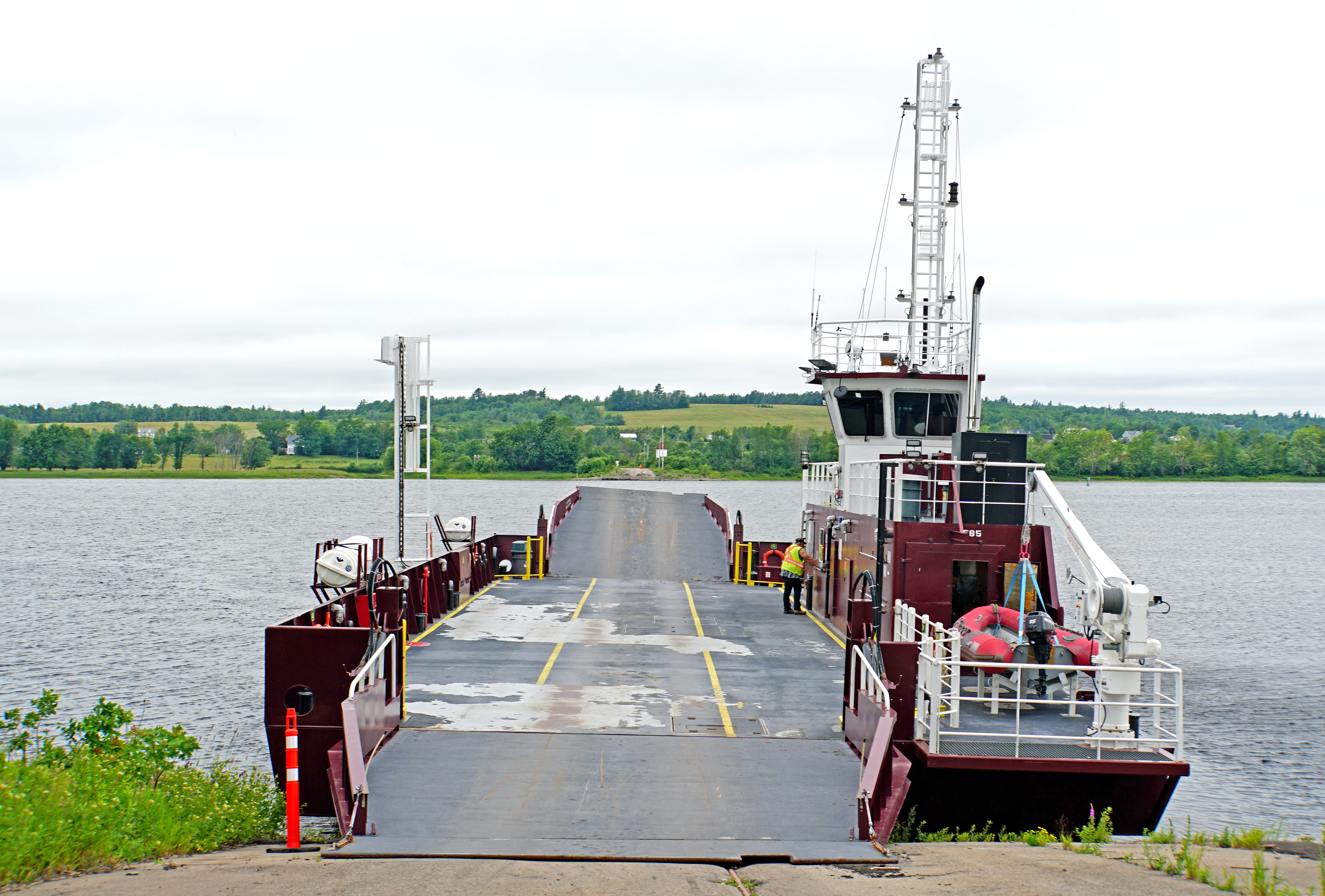
Gagetown Ferry in 2021

The Gagetown Ferry is a cable ferry in the Canadian province of New Brunswick. The ferry crosses the Saint John River, linking Arcadia on the west bank with Lower Jemseg on the east bank.

The crossing is 0.7 kilometres (0.43 mi) in length, taking less than 5 minutes, and is free of tolls. The ferry carries up to 12 cars at a time, and operates during day times hours on a seasonal schedule. It is operated by the New Brunswick Department of Transportation.

In February, 2016, the ferry service had been eliminated as part of a cost-saving measure put in place by the government. The decision created controversy and residents and users organized to pressure the government to maintain the ferry service.

In August 2019, the new Progressive Conservative government announced the return of the ferry, using the old Belleisle Bay Ferry which is currently being retrofitted for use at Arcadia.

As of July 1, 2020, ferry service has been restored between Arcadia and Jemseg with ferry F85., the former Belleisle Bay ferry.

== See also, ==
- List of crossings of the Saint John River
