= Edmundston–Madawaska Bridge =

Bridge between the US and Canada

- Coordinates: 47°21′36.5″N 68°19′43.3″W
- Crosses: Saint John River
- Locale: Madawaska, Maine (United States) to Edmundston, New Brunswick (Canada).
- Official name: Madawaska-Edmundston International Bridge.
- Other name: Edmundston–Madawaska Bridge.
- Owner: Jointly owned by the Maine Department of Transportation (MaineDOT) and the New Brunswick Department of Transportation and Infrastructure (NBDTI).
- ID number: Q5338988

Characteristics
- Total length: 1,828 feet (557 m) — built diagonally at a 45-degree angle, making it nearly double the length of the old structure.
- Width: Features two 12-foot travel lanes, two 6-foot shoulders, and a dedicated 6-foot raised sidewalk.
- Load limit: 5 tons

History
- Construction start: Spring 2021
- Construction end: June 2024
- Construction cost: $86.5 million to $88 million USD for the bridge structure contract alone (Total crossing project budget estimated at $97.5 million USD).
- Opened: June 6, 2024.
- Inaugurated: Early June 2024
- Replaces: The original 1921 steel through-truss bridge

Statistics
- Daily traffic: | traffic = 3,000 vehicles per day
- Toll: No toll

Location
- Interactive map of Edmundston–Madawaska Bridge

The Edmundston–Madawaska Bridge is an international bridge which connects the cities of Edmundston, New Brunswick, in Canada and Madawaska, Maine, in the United States, across the Saint John River. The bridge consists of four steel through truss spans, each 70.71 metres (232.0 ft) in length, for a total length of 287.12 metres (942.0 ft), which carries a two lane open steel grid deck roadway.

The bridge was constructed in 1920, replacing a cable ferry, and opened in 1921. Its original asphalt and timber deck was replaced with the current steel grid deck in 1961.

Transport Canada estimated the bridge's traffic at 759,803 vehicles annually in 2006.

Effective October 27, 2017, the Edmundston–Madawaska Bridge weight restriction was reduced to 5 tons. Vehicles over 5 tons will be rerouted to the Fort Kent–Clair Border Crossing located 33 kilometres (21 mi) west or the Saint Leonard–Van Buren Bridge located 41 kilometres (25 mi) southeast of Edmundston.

Construction on a new bridge, intended to serve as a replacement, began in May 2021. The new bridge is expected to be opened by the end of 2023, after which the current bridge is slated for demolition. In November 2023, a spokesperson for the U.S. General Services Administration said that the new bridge wouldn't open until the Spring of 2024 because of delays in the construction of the U.S. Customs House building. The Maine Department of Transportation said that the entire bridge project, including the demolition of the old bridge, would be completed by 30 June 2025.

The new bridge which cost $135 million opened in June 2024. Funding for the construction of the bridge was divided between the U.S. federal government's Infrastructure for Rebuilding America Grant Program (INFRA) and the governments of New Brunswick and Maine.

== Border crossing ==
The Madawaska - Edmundston Border Crossing is located at the Edmundston–Madawaska Bridge that connects the town of Madawaska, Maine with Edmundston, New Brunswick on the Canada–US border.

Prior to the construction of the original bridge in 1921, a hand-pulled ferry provided a way to cross the Saint John River at this location.

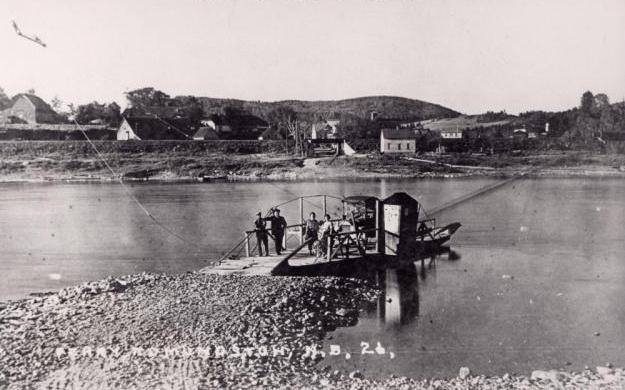
1919 photo of a hand-pulled ferry that enabled travel between Madawaska and Edmundston prior to the construction of the original bridge.

The first US border station at Madawaska was a small white cabin at the end of the bridge. Around 1930, a two-story wooden border station was constructed. This was replaced by the current one-story brick border station in 1960. For many years, Canada had a small wooden border station with a red roof. This structure was replaced in 1992 with the current brick facility.

In June 2024, a new 1,828 foot long bridge opened between Edmundston and Madawaska that connects to a new inspection facility on the US side of the border.

== See also ==
- List of bridges in Canada
- List of international bridges
