= Van Buren High School (Van Buren, Maine) =

Location
- 169 Main Street; Van Buren, Aroostook, Maine 04785; United States
- Coordinates: 41.1353°N 83.6483°W

Information
- Type: High School
- School district: Van Buren District Secondary School
- Superintendent: Karen Dubois
- School number: MSAD 24
- Principal: Kylie Lapierre
- Color
- Team name: Crusaders
- Communities served: Cyr Plantation, Hamlin, Van Buren
- Website: MSAD24.org

Van Buren High School is a public high school in Van Buren, Maine, United States. The school's sports teams are known as the Crusaders. During the 2014–15 school year, 60% of the school's 80 students were considered economically disadvantaged.

It is also known as M.S.A.D. 24 and is located on the site of the old Saint Mary's College, where the first report of the Armistice ending World War 1 was received in the U.S. on Father Thomas's wireless telegraph machine.

Louis Sockalexis played his freshman year of college baseball at St. Mary's before transferring to Holy Cross.

In 2012 the Van Buren M.S.A.D 24 Boys' Baseball team added 3 players from the Girls' Softball Team, senior Naomi Maldonado, sophomore Kayla Durette and freshman Amanda Sytulek, allowing the school to field a team in a year where many of the athletes chose the popular Van Buren H.S. tennis program.

== Alumni ==
- Paul André Albert, pioneering metallurgical scientist.
- Anthony “A.J.” Edgecomb (Class of 2011), at the time the youngest member of the 148th district of the Maine House of Representatives
- Roger Parent, former mayor of South Bend, Indiana.
