= Greenwich (surname) =

Greenwich is a surname. Notable people with the surname include:

- Alex Greenwich (born 1980), Australian activist and politician
- Ellie Greenwich (1940–2009), American singer, songwriter, and record producer
- Sonny Greenwich (born 1936), Canadian musician
