= Westfield Ferry =

Cable ferry in New Brunswick, Canada

Coordinates: 45.349612°N 66.221466°W

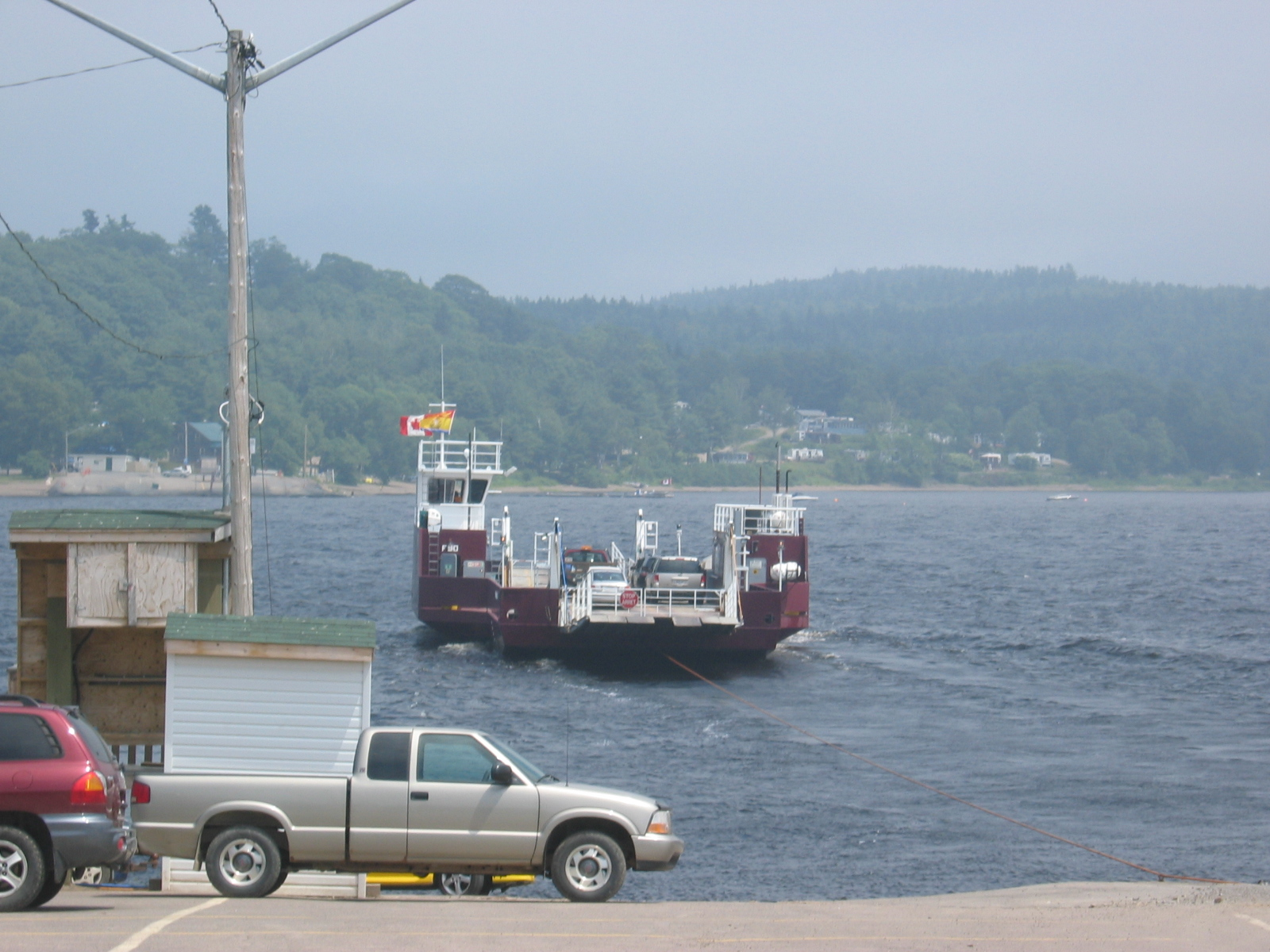
Westfield Ferry

The Westfield Ferry is a cable ferry in the Canadian province of New Brunswick. The ferry crosses the Saint John River, linking Grand Bay–Westfield on the west bank to Hardings Point on the east bank.

The crossing is 0.7 kilometres (0.43 mi) in length, takes 5 minutes, and free of tolls. Two ferries operate on the crossing, carrying up to 15 or 18 cars at a time respectively. The service operates with a single ferry 24 hours a day all year, with the second ferry brought into service at busy periods. It is operated by the New Brunswick Department of Transportation.

On October 15, 1996, the Westfield Ferry suffered a cable failure whilst the vessel was in mid-river. In high winds and waves, the drifting ferry was carried down river for about two hours, until the ferry was eventually rescued by a tugboat. The Transportation Safety Board of Canada conducted an investigation, and determined that the cable failed due to wear and corrosion of the cable. Concerns were raised about the level of training for the crew, and the lack of provision of an anchor on the ferry.

== See also ==
- List of crossings of the Saint John River
