= HM galley Comet =

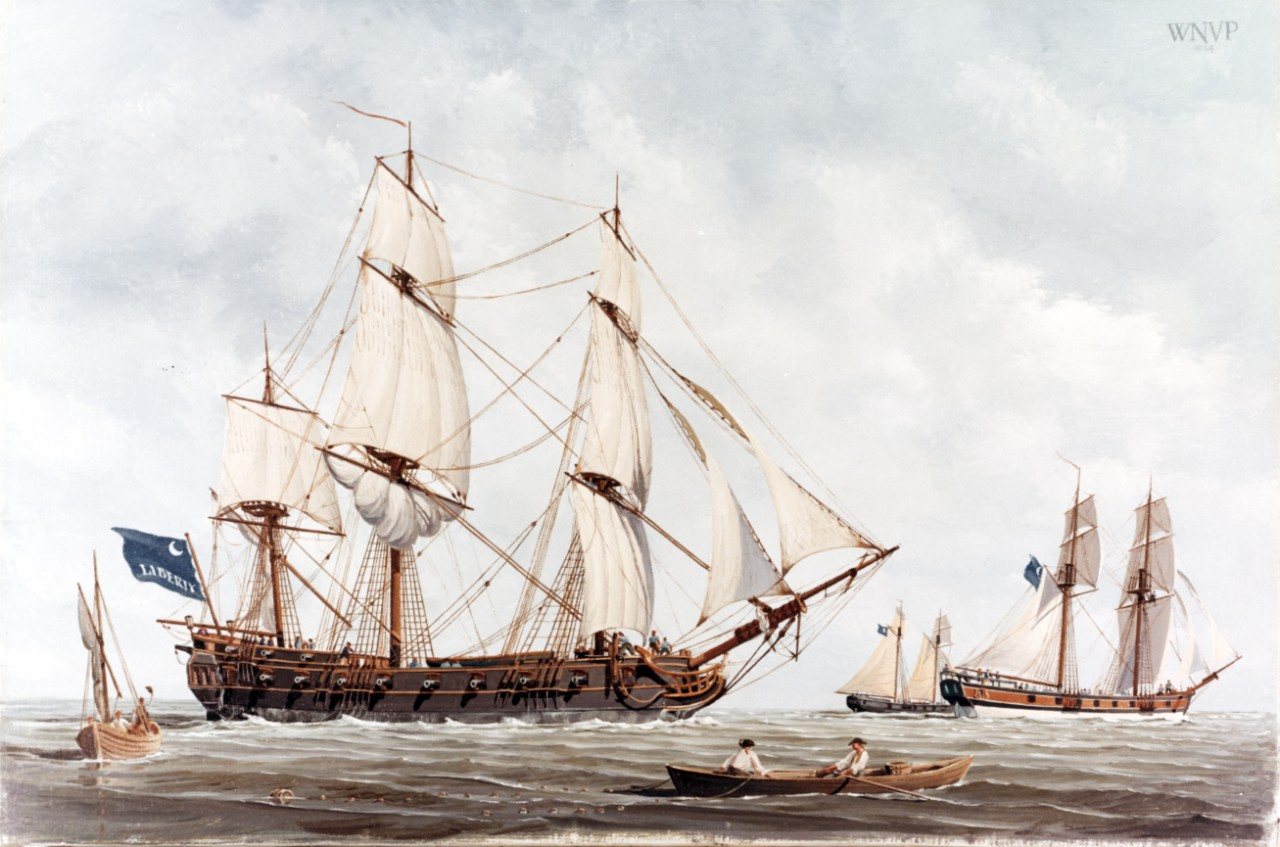
- Painting of Comet (first from right) by William Nowland Van Powell

History

South Carolina
- Name: Comet
- Acquired: 1775 by purchase
- Captured: 22 December 1777

Great Britain
- Name: HM galley Comet
- Acquired: 22 December 1777 by capture
- Fate: Destroyed 29 April 1780

General characteristics
- Type: 1775:Schooner converted to brig to snow; RN:Galley
- Tons burthen: est. 120 (bm)
- Propulsion: Sails, then oars and sails after conversion to a galley
- Complement: SC brig:80-85; Prize:35; HM galley:40
- Armament: 1775: 2 × 12-pounder guns in the bow + several 4- or 6-pounder guns amidships + possibly swivel guns as well + possibly 2 × 9-pounder stern chasers; Later:16 carriage guns total, later reduced to 12; British service: 1 × 18-pounder gun in the bow + 6 × 6-pounder guns amidships

HM galley Comet was the South Carolina Navy's brigantine Comet, which the government of South Carolina purchased in 1775. The British Royal Navy captured her in 1777. She grounded and was destroyed in 1780.

== South Carolina Navy ==
In December 1775, South Carolina purchased a shallow-draft, coasting schooner and re-rigged her as a brigantine that they named Comet. She cruised against the British with some success.

An escapee from Charlestown reported to the British on what vessels were in the harbour. One was a brig of 14 guns, a former letter of marque, that had been a prize to Comet.

On 13 October 1777 Captain James Pyne received authorization to recruit up to 80 men for Comet. He received more detailed instructions on 24 October.

On 2 November 1777 Comet, Captain Pyne, sailed from Charleston on a cruise.

On 14 December 1777, shortly before her capture, a landing party from Comet, Captain "James Pine", landed on the west end of the island of Grand Caimanes and plundered the inhabitants, killed their livestock, and carried off two Negroes and a quantity of supplies, including rum and wine.

== Capture ==
On 22 December 1777 HMS Daphne captured the snow Comet, of 16 guns, off Grand Camanes without firing a shot. The mention in the London Gazette of Comet's capture describes her as being on a cruise from South Carolina, armed for war, and under the command of James Pyne. It also gives her ownership as "Congress". Daphne sent Comet into New York. Another report refers to Comet as a privateer, of 18 guns and 84 or 87 men, and states that Daphne captured her off the Isle of Pines.

Daphne landed her prisoners at Pensacola, where a handful escaped. Daphne and Comet, with a prize crew of 35 men, then cruised off the Charlestown bar.

Comet, under the command of Lieutenant Thomas Drury, arrived at New York on 7 March 1778. William Peacock was appointed to command in mid-March.

== Royal Navy ==
The Royal Navy took Comet into service. At some point the Navy had Comet cut down to a galley. HMS Fowey then towed her to Savannah, Georgia, to operate from there.

On 16 April 1779, the armed sloop HMS Greenwich, Comet, and two other galleys, Thunder and Hornet, captured the two Georgia navy galleys – Lee and Congress – near Yamasee Bluff on the Savannah River. Congress was armed with one 18-pounder and one 12-pounder gun in her prow, and two 6-pounder and two 9-pounder guns in her wales. She had 100 men aboard including South Carolinian troops. Congress became HM galley Scourge, under Lieutenant George Prince. Lee was armed with one 12 and one 9-pounder gun in her prow, and two 4-pounder and two 1-pounder guns in her wales. She had 130 French men aboard. Lee became HM galley Vindictive, under the command of Mr. Edward Ellis Watmough.

Comet and the galley Snake may have been at Wappoo, where they protected Lt. Col. John Maitland's retreat, enabling him to reach Savannah with his troops just in time to reinforce it before the commencement of the Franco-American Siege of Savannah.

To protect Savannah, the Royal Navy contributed two over-age frigates: Fowey and HMS Rose. They landed their guns and most of their men to reinforce the land forces. In addition, the British also deployed the armed brig Keppel and the armed ship Germaine, the latter from the East Florida navy. There were two galleys, Comet and Thunder, the latter too from East Florida. Lastly, the British armed two merchant vessels, Savannah, and Venus.

On 19 September, as Charles-Marie de Trolong du Rumain moved his squadron up the river, he exchanged fire with Comet, Thunder, Savannah, and Venus. Rose was leaking badly so the next day the British scuttled her just below the town to impede the French vessels from progressing further. They also burnt Savannah and Venus. By scuttling Rose in a narrow part of the channel, the British effectively blocked it. Consequently, the French fleet was unable to assist the American assault.

Germaine took up a position to protect the north side of Savannah's defenses. Comet and Thunder had the mission of opposing any attempt by the South Carolinian galleys to bombard the town. Over the next few days British shore batteries assisted Comet and Thunder in engagements with two South Carolinian galleys; during one of these they severely damaged Revenge. On 17 October the Franco-American force abandoned the siege.

Comet participated in the Siege of Charleston in 1780. She was under the command of Lieutenant Samuel McKinley. (Note: Some records state that her commander was John McKinley. John was Samuel's brother, but it was Samuel who commanded Comet.)

== Fate ==
On 29 April 1780 Comet ran aground at the entrance to the Hog Island Channel. The Americans had built a redoubt on Haddrell's Point to control access to the channel, and Admiral Mariot Arbuthnot needed to neutralize it if he was to move his vessels into the Cooper River to support General Sir Henry Clinton's planned attack on the Charles Town neck. Comet attacked the redoubt but the American's were able to destroy her when she became unable to escape.

McKinley died on the North America Station in 1780, but it is not clear when.

Major Patrick Ferguson and 60 men from his American Volunteers captured the redoubt on 2 May. The garrison of about 20 men from the 1st South Carolina Regiment withdrew after a token resistance.
