= Saint Leonard–Van Buren Bridge =

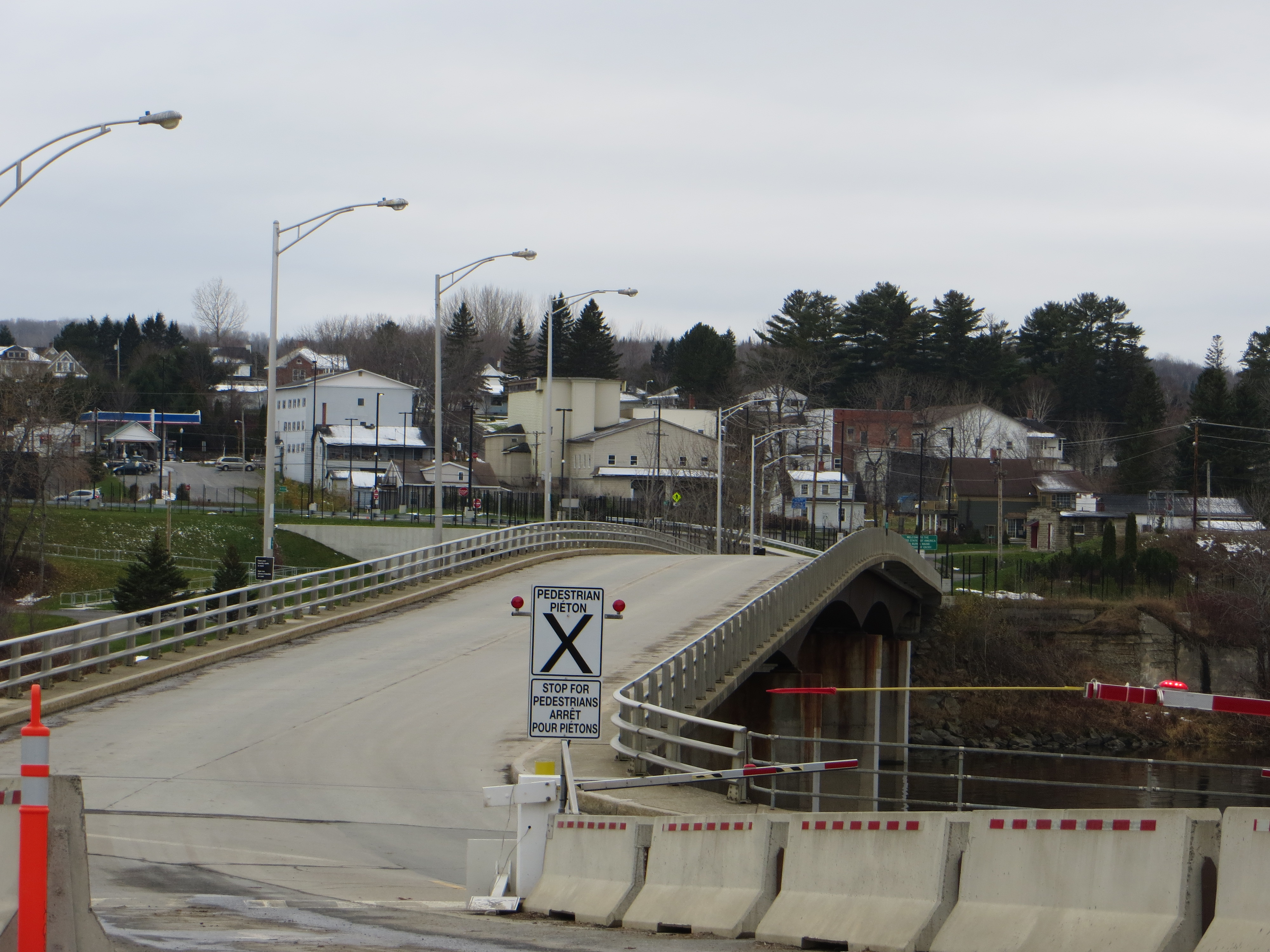
- Bridge over the Saint John River with Van Buren in the background
- Coordinates: 47°09′34.92″N 67°55′51.24″W
- Crosses: St. John River
- Locale: St. Leonard, New Brunswick, Canada & Van Buren, Maine, United States

History
- Designer: Elmer E. Greenwood
- Opened: 1912
- Rebuilt: 1972

Location
- Interactive map of Saint Leonard–Van Buren Bridge

The Saint Leonard–Van Buren Bridge is an international bridge, which connects the communities of St. Leonard, New Brunswick in Canada and Van Buren, Maine in the United States, across the Saint John River.

== Border crossing ==
Canada Customs at St. Leonard, New Brunswick, as seen in 1937

The Van Buren–St. Leonard Border Crossing is located at the bridge that connects the town of Van Buren, Maine with St. Leonard, New Brunswick on the Canada–United States border. During the 19th century, hand-pulled ferry service connected these two cities. In 2008, a flood of the Saint John River severely damaged the Van Buren border station. A new facility was completed in 2013.

== History ==
The bridge was first constructed in 1911, replacing a cable ferry, and opened in 1912. It was designed and construction overseen by Elmer E. Greenwood, who was the principal bridge designer for the state of Maine from the period 1904–1916. The current structure replaced the original bridge in 1972.

== See also ==
- List of crossings of the Saint John River
- List of international bridges in North America
- List of Canada–United States border crossings
