= New Brunswick Route 875 =

Highway in New Brunswick, Canada

Coordinates: 45.724937°N 65.676098°W

Route 875

Route information
- Maintained by New Brunswick Department of Transportation
- Length: 14 km (8.7 mi)

Major junctions
- East end: Route 880 in Lower Millstream
- West end: Route 870 in Belleisle Creek

Location
- Country: Canada
- Province: New Brunswick

Highway system
- Provincial highways in New Brunswick; Former routes
← Route 870	→ Route 880

Route 875 is a 13.6-kilometre (8.5 mi) long east to west secondary highway in the south-eastern portion of New Brunswick, Canada.

== Route description ==
Most of the route is in Kings County.

The route's eastern terminus is in Lower Millstream at Route 880, where it travels east through a mostly wooded area to Searsville. From here, the route continues through Pascobac and ends in the community of Belleisle Creek at Route 870.
