= Keirsteadville, New Brunswick =

Coordinates: 45.633°N 65.862°W

Keirsteadville is a rural community in Kings County, New Brunswick, Canada. It is located on the shore of Belleisle Bay, directly across from Springfield.

== See also ==
- List of communities in New Brunswick
