= Midland, Kings County, New Brunswick =

Community in New Brunswick, Canada

Coordinates: 45.652828°N 65.787094°W

Location of Midland in New Brunswick

Midland is a community in the Canadian province of New Brunswick, located in Springfield Parish, Kings County.

== Neighbouring communities ==
- Valley Waters
- Keirsteadville

== See also ==
- List of communities in New Brunswick
