= Hampstead Ferry =

Coordinates: 45.624543°N 66.077142°W

The Hampstead Ferry was a cable ferry in the Canadian province of New Brunswick. The ferry crossed the Saint John River, linking Hampstead on the west bank with Wickham on the east bank.

== About ==
The crossing was 900 metres (0.56 mi) in length, taking 5 minutes, and was free of tolls. The ferry carried up to 12 cars at a time, and operated from May to November, subject to ice and flood conditions, and between 6 am and midnight. It was operated by the New Brunswick Department of Transportation. In 2009, the New Brunswick Department of Transportation cancelled the Hampstead ferry service.

== See also ==
- List of crossings of the Saint John River
