= HMS Greenwich (1777) =

History

British East India Company
- Name: Greenwich
- Namesake: Greenwich
- Owner: EIC voyage #1:John Henniker; EIC voyage #2:Thomas Debuke; EIC voyages #3&4:F Atherton Hindley
- Builder: John & William Wells, Deptford
- Launched: 1766
- Fate: Sold to the Royal Navy 1777

Great Britain
- Name: HMS Greenwich
- Completed: 12 December 1777 at Deptford Dockyard
- Acquired: September 1777
- Commissioned: September 1777
- Decommissioned: March 1783
- In service: 1777–1779; 1779–1783
- Fate: Sold at Deptford Dockyard, 10 April 1783

General characteristics
- Class & type: 26-gun sixth-rate frigate
- Tons burthen: 676, or 75348/94, or 754 bm
- Length: Overall:140 ft 9 in (42.9 m), or 145 ft 6 in (44.3 m); Keel:116 ft 9 in (35.6 m)
- Beam: 34 ft 10 in (10.6 m), 35 ft 0 in (10.7 m)
- Depth of hold: 13 ft 10 in (4.2 m)
- Sail plan: Full-rigged ship
- Complement: 200 from 1777–1779; 160 from 1780–1783
- Armament: Upper deck: 20 × 9-pounder guns; Forecastle: 2 × 6-pounder guns (from 1779)

HMS Greenwich was the East Indiaman Greenwich, launched in 1766 that made four voyages to India for the British East India Company. The Royal Navy purchased her in 1777 for use as a frigate during the American Revolutionary War, but then converted her to a storeship and receiving ship . She saw service in North American waters and off the English port of Sheerness between 1777 and 1783, but was ultimately declared surplus to requirements and sold into private hands at Deptford Dockyard.

== EIC voyages ==
=== EIC voyage #1 (1767–1768) ===
Captain Benjamin Hooke sailed from the Downs on 24 April 1767, bound for Bombay. On 19 May Greenwich was at São Tiago, on 30 August Madagascar, on 30 November Cochin, on 9 December Tellicherry, and on 24 December she arrived at Bombay. Homeward bound, she was at Tellicherry on 6 May 1768, and Cochin on 18 May. She reached St Helena on 22 August, and arrived at the Downs on 19 November.

=== EIC voyage #2 (1770–1771) ===
Captain Robert Carr sailed from the Downs on 21 February 1770. On 12 June Greenwich reached Madagascar, and on 20 July she arrived at Bombay. Homeward bound, she was at Tellicherry on 6 December, Cochin on 11 December, and Anjengo on 15 December. She reached St Helena on 10 March 1771, and arrived at the Downs on 28 May.

=== EIC voyage #3 (1771–1773) ===
Captain Carr sailed from Portsmouth on 31 December 1771, bound for Madras and Bengal. Greenwich was at Madeira on 15 January 1772, the Cape on 5 May, Johanna on 18 June, and Madras on 16 July. She arrived at Culpee on 22 August. Homeward bound, she was at Ingeli on 21 November and the Cape on 28 February 1773. She reached St Helena on 8 April and Ascension on 24 April, and arrived at the Downs 21 June.

=== EIC voyage #4 (1776–1777) ===
Captain Carr sailed from Falmouth on 7 January 1776, bound for Madras and Bengal. Greenwich reached the Cape on 1 April and Madras on 2 June. She arrived at Culpee on 2 July. Homeward bound, she was at Ingeli on 25 August, Madras on 20 September, Mauritius on 3 December, 8 Dec Réunion on 8 December, and the Cape on 17 January 1777. She reached St Helena on 11 March and arrived at the Downs on 23 July.

== Naval service ==
The Royal Navy purchased Greenwich in September 1777 and commissioned her under Commander Christopher Rigby for North American service. Her first assignment was as a storeship, carrying supplies to British troops in Boston and New York; she set sail for North America on 16 March 1778 and remained there until the following year.

In March 1779 she returned to Woolwich Dockyard for repair. In April she sailed to Sheerness Dockyard where she was refitted as a 22-gun receiving ship, to collect and hold sailors gathered by press gangs operating ashore. Commander William Daniel recommission her on 16 March 1779. Fitting-out lasted until August. She then served as a depot at Sea Reach.

== Fate ==
Greenwich was paid off in March 1783 and sailed to Deptford Dockyard for disposal. She was sold back into private ownership on 10 April 1783 for the sum of £400.
