= Greenwich Hill, New Brunswick =

Greenwich Hill
- Unincorporated community
- Location within New Brunswick.
- Coordinates: 45°27′59″N 66°10′27″W
- Country: Canada
- Province: New Brunswick
- County: Kings
- Parish: Greenwich
- Electoral Districts Federal: New Brunswick Southwest

Government
  - Type: Local service district
- Time zone: UTC-4 (AST)
  - Summer (DST): UTC-3 (ADT)
- Postal code(s): E3L
- Area code: 506
- Highways: None

Greenwich Hill is a Canadian unincorporated community in Kings County, New Brunswick.

== See also ==
- List of communities in New Brunswick
