= Belleisle Bay Ferry =

Cable ferry in Canada

Coordinates: 45.611936°N 65.908098°W

The Belleisle Bay Ferry is a cable ferry in the Canadian province of New Brunswick. The ferry crosses Belleisle Bay, a fjord-like branch of the Saint John River, linking Kars on the north bank to Long Point on the south bank.

The crossing is 1 kilometre (0.62 mi) in length, takes 7 minutes, and is free of tolls. The ferry carries up to 12 cars at a time, and operates 24 hours a day all year. It is operated by the New Brunswick Department of Transportation.
