= Hatfield Point, New Brunswick =

Coordinates: 45.653°N 65.865°W

Location of Hatfield Point in New Brunswick

Hatfield Point is a settlement on the Belleisle Bay in Kings County, New Brunswick.

== History ==
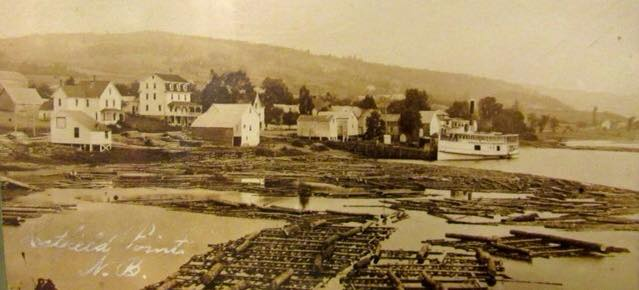
Hatfield Point NB, c. 1915

Hatfield Point is located at the head of the Belleisle Bay, called "Pascobac" ("Side Bay") by the Wolastoqiyik, who hunted and fished in the area. European settlement began in 1783 with the arrival of Captain Thomas Spragg, a United Empire Loyalist militia officer from Hempstead, Long Island. Spragg and his adult sons were granted large tracts on the north side of the Bay, soon dubbed "Spragg's Point".

The first settlers were largely Loyalists from New York, with subsequent immigration directly from Britain and Ireland. Originally, most belonged to the established Church of England. However, the early 1800s brought a religious shift as the Anglican Church moved to Springfield. Founded in 1806, the "First Springfield Calvinist Baptist Church", now "Hatfield Point Baptist Church", became the mother church of several Baptist chapels around the Belleisle.

The economy was mainly agricultural, supplemented by seasonal trade in lumber and fur. The early-to-mid 1800s saw the rise of riverboats on the Saint John River system, which became the chief means of transportation in southern New Brunswick. Spragg's Point was the last stop on the Belleisle, and the Pleasantview Hotel opened to house the incoming travellers and salesmen. In the 1880s, the settlement became Hatfield's Point, reflecting the preference of the local postmaster. In addition to the hotel and the post office, Hatfield Point would also host a sawmill, a doctor's office, two stores, a Pentecostal Church and later an auto garage. The boiler of the SS Springfield, a riverboat that burnt down while at anchor off the point, is still visible from the community wharf, emerging from the water in a shallow part of the bay.

== Historiography ==
Though a very small community, Hatfield Point and its people have been the subjects of several oral and informal histories, including works by Marsha Boyd, Thomas Shanklin, Calin Coburn and Elizabeth Drake McDonald. Though these deal with particular families and events, they combine to give a fuller impression of life in the Belleisle Valley.

== Notable people ==
Hatfield Point's most famous resident was Bob Nolan, born Robert Clarence Nobles. He spent much of his childhood on his grandparents' farm in Hatfield Point. He was a member of the Sons of the Pioneers and a prolific songwriter, with Cool Water and Tumbling Tumbleweeds his best-known works.

David Crandall, the son of Joseph Crandall, was the resident Baptist minister for a period in the late 1800s. Hatfield Point was also the birthplace and summer residence of Prof. Shirley Jackson Case. Born in 1872, Case was a mathematician and church historian at the University of Chicago.

== See also ==
- List of communities in New Brunswick
