= Hawkshaw Bridge =

Coordinates: 45°57′42.0″N 67°14′53.5″W

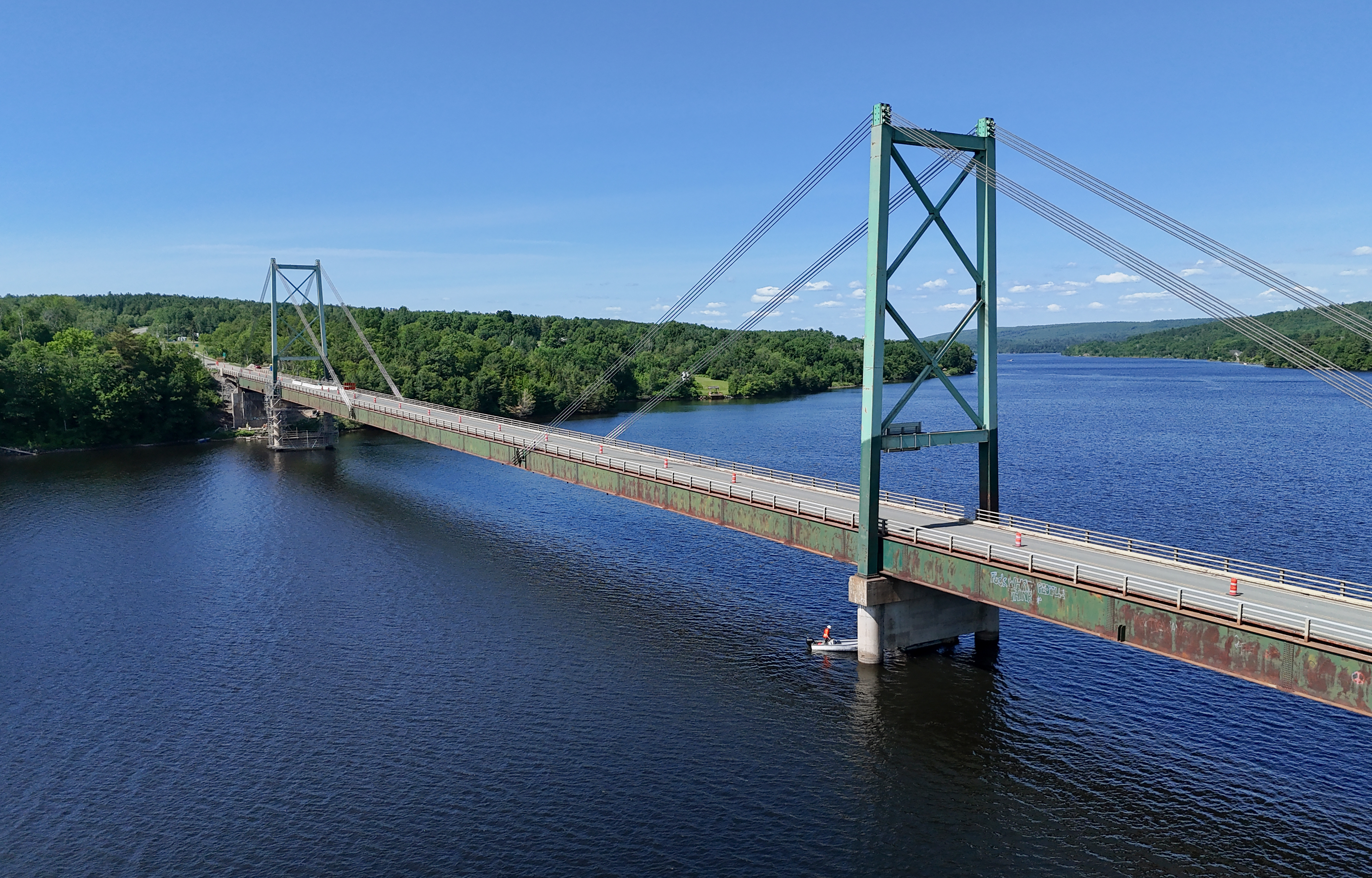

The Hawkshaw Bridge is a cable-stayed suspension bridge crossing the Saint John River near Nackawic-Millville, New Brunswick, Canada.

Built in 1967, and one of the earliest bridges of its type in Canada, Hawkshaw Bridge has a main span of 217 m (713 ft). In 2025 a multi-year program of rehabilitation was initiated, with a completion date slated for 2030.

== Earlier bridge of the same name ==
An earlier truss-type bridge was erected about 500 meters downstream of the current structure in 1908. It had to be replaced and demolished prior to completion of the Mactaquac Dam, which would have flooded the structure. In November 1967, not long after the current bridge was opened, the original bridge was destroyed by sappers from CFB Gagetown, who used the demolition as a training opportunity.

== See also ==
- List of bridges in Canada
