= Shannon, New Brunswick =

Coordinates: 45.70588°N 65.973845°W

Shannon is a small farming community in the Parish of Wickham in Queens County, New Brunswick, Canada. The name traces its origin to one of the first settlers, John Shanahan. It adjoins the similar communities of Henderson Settlement, Belyeas Cove and Bald Hill.

== See also ==
- List of communities in New Brunswick
