= Van Buren, Maine =

- Town
- Aerial view of Van Buren in 2026

- Seal
- Nickname: Gateway to the St. John Valley
- Motto: In Hoc Signo Vinces (Latin) "With this as your standard you shall have victory"
- Location of Van Buren in Aroostook County, Maine
- Coordinates: 47°12′08″N 68°00′25″W
- Country: United States
- State: Maine
- County: Aroostook
- Incorporated: March 1881
- Villages: Van Buren; Keegan

Area
  - Total: 34.86 sq mi (90.29 km^{2})
  - Land: 33.78 sq mi (87.49 km^{2})
  - Water: 1.08 sq mi (2.80 km^{2})
- Elevation: 656 ft (200 m)

Population (2020)
  - Total: 2,038
  - Density: 60/sq mi (23.3/km^{2})
- Time zone: UTC−5 (Eastern Time Zone)
  - Summer (DST): UTC−4 (EDT)
- ZIP Code: 04785
- Area code: 207
- GNIS feature ID: 582776
- Website: vanburenmaine.com

Van Buren is a town in Aroostook County, Maine, United States, located along the Saint John River across from Saint-Léonard, New Brunswick, Canada. The population was 2,038 at the 2020 United States census.

The town is named after Martin Van Buren, the eighth president of the United States.

== Geography ==
According to the United States Census Bureau, the town has a total area of 34.86 square miles (90.29 km^{2}), of which 33.78 square miles (87.49 km^{2}) is land and 1.08 square miles (2.80 km^{2}) is water.

Van Buren is connected to Saint Leonard, New Brunswick, via the Saint Leonard-Van Buren Bridge.

=== Climate ===
This climatic region is typified by large seasonal temperature differences, with warm to hot (and often humid) summers and cold (sometimes severely cold) winters. According to the Köppen Climate Classification system, Van Buren has a humid continental climate, abbreviated "Dfb" on climate maps.

Climate data for Van Buren, Maine, (1991–2020 normals, extremes 1902–1935, 1963–present)
Month	Jan	Feb	Mar	Apr	May	Jun	Jul	Aug	Sep	Oct	Nov	Dec	Year
Record high °F (°C)	55 (13)	61 (16)	77 (25)	85 (29)	96 (36)	98 (37)	99 (37)	103 (39)	92 (33)	92 (33)	74 (23)	60 (16)	103 (39)
Mean maximum °F (°C)	42.4 (5.8)	42.5 (5.8)	51.0 (10.6)	67.2 (19.6)	81.0 (27.2)	87.0 (30.6)	88.8 (31.6)	87.9 (31.1)	82.2 (27.9)	71.7 (22.1)	59.8 (15.4)	47.2 (8.4)	91.2 (32.9)
Mean daily maximum °F (°C)	19.1 (−7.2)	22.6 (−5.2)	33.0 (0.6)	46.5 (8.1)	61.9 (16.6)	71.2 (21.8)	76.3 (24.6)	75.3 (24.1)	66.7 (19.3)	52.5 (11.4)	38.8 (3.8)	26.3 (−3.2)	49.2 (9.6)
Daily mean °F (°C)	7.4 (−13.7)	8.9 (−12.8)	20.9 (−6.2)	36.4 (2.4)	50.4 (10.2)	59.9 (15.5)	65.7 (18.7)	64.1 (17.8)	55.4 (13.0)	42.9 (6.1)	31.2 (−0.4)	17.3 (−8.2)	38.4 (3.5)
Mean daily minimum °F (°C)	−4.3 (−20.2)	−4.8 (−20.4)	8.9 (−12.8)	26.3 (−3.2)	38.9 (3.8)	48.7 (9.3)	55.2 (12.9)	52.9 (11.6)	44.0 (6.7)	33.3 (0.7)	23.7 (−4.6)	8.2 (−13.2)	27.6 (−2.4)
Mean minimum °F (°C)	−29.6 (−34.2)	−28.9 (−33.8)	−18.7 (−28.2)	9.8 (−12.3)	26.0 (−3.3)	33.8 (1.0)	42.6 (5.9)	40.6 (4.8)	29.8 (−1.2)	19.5 (−6.9)	3.9 (−15.6)	−15.8 (−26.6)	−32.9 (−36.1)
Record low °F (°C)	−48 (−44)	−44 (−42)	−37 (−38)	−19 (−28)	18 (−8)	22 (−6)	30 (−1)	26 (−3)	18 (−8)	1 (−17)	−20 (−29)	−42 (−41)	−48 (−44)
Average precipitation inches (mm)	2.87 (73)	2.27 (58)	2.45 (62)	3.06 (78)	3.61 (92)	3.97 (101)	4.81 (122)	3.48 (88)	3.83 (97)	4.37 (111)	3.37 (86)	3.38 (86)	41.47 (1,053)
Average snowfall inches (cm)	24.5 (62)	20.0 (51)	17.5 (44)	5.7 (14)	0.1 (0.25)	0.0 (0.0)	0.0 (0.0)	0.0 (0.0)	0.0 (0.0)	0.8 (2.0)	7.4 (19)	20.7 (53)	96.7 (246)
Average extreme snow depth inches (cm)	22.8 (58)	28.5 (72)	29.0 (74)	15.1 (38)	0.1 (0.25)	0.0 (0.0)	0.0 (0.0)	0.0 (0.0)	0.0 (0.0)	0.6 (1.5)	5.1 (13)	13.6 (35)	33.4 (85)
Average precipitation days (≥ 0.01 in)	10.4	9.3	10.5	11.2	13.5	12.8	14.4	12.5	11.4	13.2	12.2	12.0	143.4
Average snowy days (≥ 0.1 in)	8.1	7.6	6.1	2.4	0.1	0.0	0.0	0.0	0.0	0.4	3.3	7.6	35.6
Average relative humidity (%)	92	93	93	87	76	77	78	80	81	82	82	90	84
Mean daily sunshine hours	2.4	2.1	3.0	5.2	7.4	8.2	9.2	9.3	7.1	5.4	3.9	2.9	5.5
Mean daily daylight hours	9.0	10.3	12.0	13.7	15.1	15.9	15.5	14.2	12.5	10.8	9.4	8.6	12.3
Average ultraviolet index	1	1	1	2	4	5	5	4	3	2	1	1	3
Source 1: NOAA
Source 2: Weather Atlas (UV and humidity)

== Education ==
Van Buren is part of the Maine School Administrative District No. 24 school system, which contains two schools: Van Buren District Elementary School and Van Buren District Secondary School.

== Demographics ==
Historical population
Census	Pop.	Note	%±
1850	1,050		—
1860	616		−41.3%
1870	922		49.7%
1880	1,110		20.4%
1890	1,168		5.2%
1900	1,878		60.8%
1910	3,065		63.2%
1920	4,594		49.9%
1930	4,721		2.8%
1940	5,380		14.0%
1950	5,094		−5.3%
1960	4,679		−8.1%
1970	3,971		−15.1%
1980	3,557		−10.4%
1990	3,045		−14.4%
2000	2,631		−13.6%
2010	2,171		−17.5%
2020	2,038		−6.1%
U.S. Decennial Census

Van Buren is part of Francophone North America; according to the most recent American Community Survey data, up to 44.7% of the population age 5 and older speak French at home. Links with Québec and New Brunswick are consequently strong.

=== 2010 census ===
As of the census of 2010, there were 2,171 people, 1,027 households, and 601 families living in the town. The population density was 64.3 inhabitants per square mile (24.8/km^{2}). There were 1,184 housing units at an average density of 35.1 units per square mile (13.6 units/km^{2}). The racial makeup of the town was 96.9% White, 0.3% African American, 0.4% Native American, 0.1% Asian, 0.3% from other races, and 2.1% from two or more races. Hispanic or Latino of any race were 0.6% of the population.

There were 1,027 households, of which 20.5% had children under the age of 18 living with them, 43.1% were married couples living together, 11.2% had a female householder with no husband present, 4.2% had a male householder with no wife present, and 41.5% were non-families. 36.7% of all households were made up of individuals, and 17.2% had someone living alone who was 65 years of age or older. The average household size was 2.06 and the average family size was 2.55.

The median age in the town was 51.5 years. 15.9% of residents were under the age of 18; 6% were between the ages of 18 and 24; 18.2% were from 25 to 44; 35.1% were from 45 to 64; and 24.7% were 65 years of age or older. The gender makeup of the town was 48.5% male and 51.5% female.

=== 2000 census ===
Languages (2000)	Percent
Spoke French at home	77.15%
Spoke English at home	22.85%

As of the census of 2000, there were 2,631 people, 1,095 households, and 704 families living in the town. The population density was 77.5 inhabitants per square mile (29.9/km^{2}). There were 1,232 housing units at an average density of 36.3 units per square mile (14.0 units/km^{2}). The racial makeup of the town was 98.59% White, 0.11% Black or African American, 0.30% Native American, 0.15% Asian, 0.04% from other races, and 0.80% from two or more races. Hispanic or Latino of any race were 0.72% of the population.

There were 1,095 households, out of which 25.9% had children under the age of 18 living with them, 50.6% were married couples living together, 9.0% had a female householder with no husband present, and 35.7% were non-families. 31.5% of all households were made up of individuals, and 14.9% had someone living alone who was 65 years of age or older. The average household size was 2.22 and the average family size was 2.73.

In the town, the population was spread out, with 19.8% under the age of 18, 5.3% from 18 to 24, 24.5% from 25 to 44, 28.3% from 45 to 64, and 22.1% who were 65 years of age or older. The median age was 45 years. For every 100 females, there were 87.9 males. For every 100 females age 18 and over, there were 85.7 males.

The median income for a household in the town was $20,038, and the median income for a family was $29,458. Males had a median income of $27,411 versus $19,583 for females. The per capita income for the town was $12,651. About 15.2% of families and 22.1% of the population were below the poverty line, including 25.9% of those under age 18 and 14.5% of those age 65 or over.
