= HMS Greenwich (1778) =

Sloop of the Royal Navy

History

Rhode Island
- Name: Greenwich
- Namesake: East Greenwich, Rhode Island
- Owner: Nathaniel Greene & Co.
- Commissioned: November 1776
- Captured: 20 April 1778

Great Britain
- Name: HMS Greenwich
- Acquired: October 1778 by purchase of a prize
- Fate: Burnt 21 May 1779

General characteristics
- Tons burthen: 80 (bm)
- Complement: At capture:39; Royal Navy:50
- Armament: At capture:8 guns; Royal Navy:12 guns

HMS Greenwich was the American privateer Greenwich that HMS Maidstone captured on 20 April 1778. She served for a little more than a year, particularly at Georgia, before she was burnt in May 1779.

== Privateer ==
Captain Joseph Gardiner received a letter of marque for the sloop Greenwich in November 1776. He advertised for crew on 22 November 1777, announcing that he planned to sail in early December.

Greenwich was on her way to New Bedford when on 20 April 1778 she encountered Maidstone. Maidstone fired on Greenwich, which immediately struck at 40°22′N 67°02′W, 35 leagues east of Nantucket. She was armed with eight guns, and had a crew of 39 men under Captain Joseph Gardner. Maidstone took out the crew as prisoners and put a prize crew of a midshipman and eight seamen aboard her; the prize crew sailed her to Rhode Island.

== Royal Navy armed sloop ==
The Navy purchased Greenwich in October and commissioned her under Lieutenant Thomas Spry.

Between 6&7 October Greenwich participated in a raid on Little Egg Harbour. Because she and the armed sloop Granby grounded on Mincock Island, their participation was limited. They were gotten off as the raiding force withdrew.

On 16 April 1779, the armed sloop Greenwich, HM galley Comet, and two other galleys, Thunder and Hornet, captured the two Georgia navy galleys – Lee and Congress – near Yamasee Bluff on the Savannah River. Congress was armed with one 18-pounder and one 12-pounder gun in her prow, and two 6-pounder and two 9-pounder guns in her wales. She had 100 men aboard including South Carolinian troops. Congress became HM galley Scourge, under Lieutenant George Prince. Lee was armed with one 12 and one 9-pounder in her prow, and two 4-pounder and two 1-pounder guns in her wales. She had 130 French men aboard. Lee became HM galley Vindictive, under the command of Mr. Edward Ellis Watmough.

== Fate ==
Greenwich attempted to enter Stono Inlet, South Carolina, on 21 May. Although she had a pilot on board she grounded. Her crew was unable to free her and the next day her predicament led the Americans to bring up two galleys to fire on her. Her crew then burnt her to prevent the Americans capturing her. The pilot was ordered to be held on Scourge but he escaped before the court martial inquiring into her loss.
