= Evandale Ferry =

Coordinates: 45.59242°N 66.027017°W

The Evandale Ferry is a cable ferry in the Canadian province of New Brunswick. The ferry carries New Brunswick Route 124 across the Saint John River, linking Kars on the east bank to Evandale on the west bank.

The crossing is 0.5 kilometres (0.31 mi) in length, takes 5 minutes, and is free of tolls. The ferry carries up to 15 cars at a time, and operates 24 hours a day all year. It is operated by the New Brunswick Department of Transportation. The department has a ferry maintenance yard by the ferry's eastern terminus.

== See also ==
- List of crossings of the Saint John River
