= Belleisle Bay =

Coordinates: 45°32′43.4″N 66°0′49.8″W

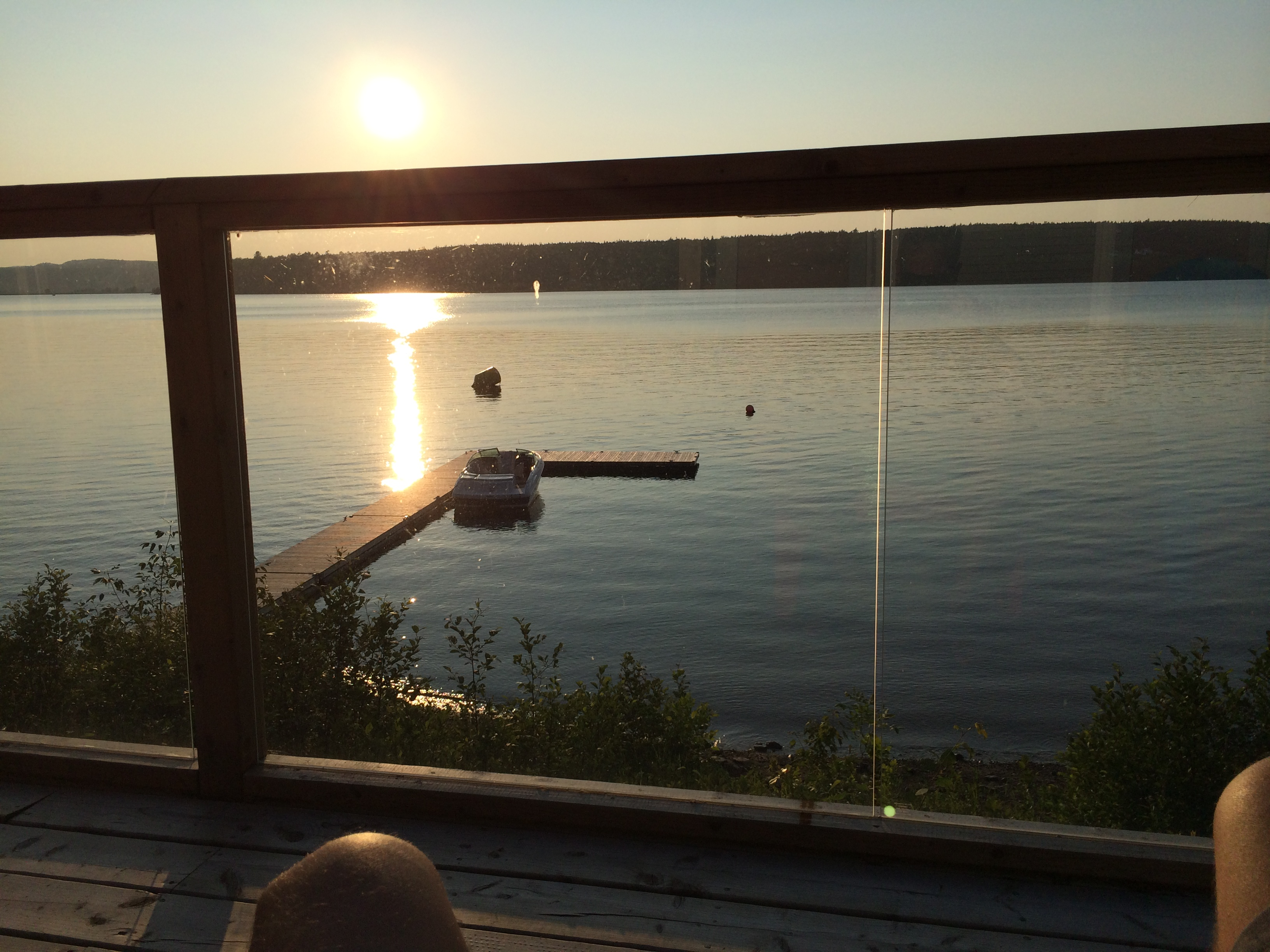
Belleisle Bay

Belleisle Bay is a fjord-like branch of the Saint John River in the Canadian province of New Brunswick.

Species of fish common to the area include, among others:

- Yellow perch
- White perch
- Smallmouth bass
- American eel
- Lamprey eel
- Pumpkin seed sunfish
- Brown bull head catfish
- Yellow bull head catfish
- White bull head catfish
- Southern channel catfish (a very rare catch in Canada)
- Chain pickerel
- Muskey (also rare)
- Sturgeon
- Stripped bass
- Brown trout
- Atlantic salmon

== Geography ==
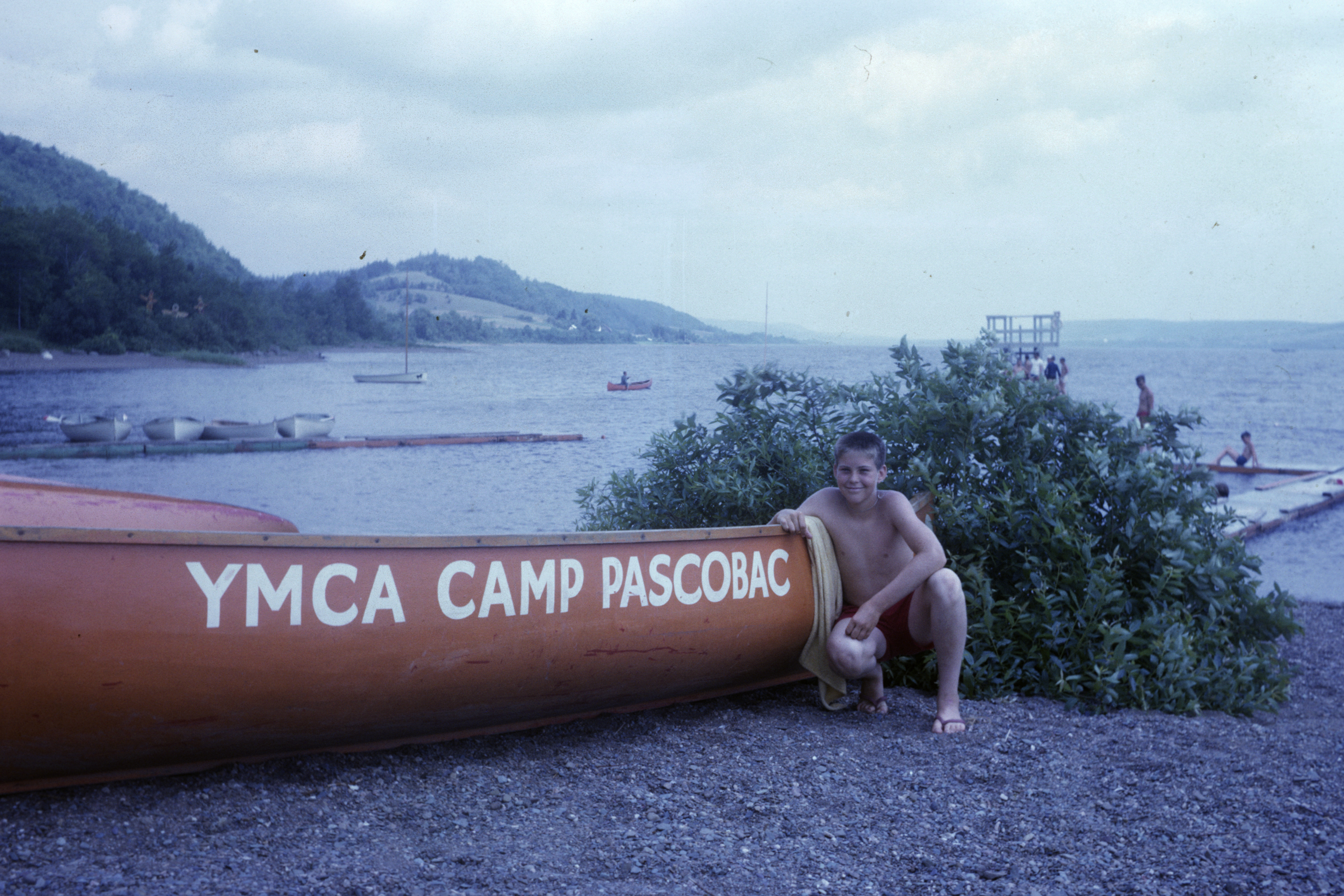
Camp Pascobac camper with Belleisle Bay in the background (ca. 1965).

The bay is oriented northeast from the river, which it joins at the head of Long Reach, just south of the village of Evandale. Belleisle Bay forms part of the northern boundary of southern New Brunswick's "Kingston Peninsula", with the southern boundary being the Kennebecasis River.

Belleisle Bay has little current as it has few freshwater inlets and acts more-or-less as a lake in a glacial valley, framed by the low rolling hills of the St. Croix Highlands of the Appalachian range. Although the bay is mostly freshwater, the entire lower Saint John River system has a limited saltwater tidal influence resulting from the Reversing Falls. Its waters freeze completely in the winter months.

Measuring approximately 18 kilometers long by 1 kilometer wide, Belleisle Bay has several small freshwater streams, namely Kingston Creek, near the mouth of the bay, and Belleisle Creek at the head of the bay. A small wetland also exists at the head of the bay. The bay hosts a single island, Ghost Island, located between Elmhurst and Lower Kars.

The bay is located entirely within Kings County. The Belleisle Bay Ferry, a year-round cable ferry, crosses the bay between Earle Wharf and Long Point.

== See also ==
- List of bays of New Brunswick
