= Long Point, New Brunswick =

Coordinates: 45.615°N 65.892°W

Long Point is a rural community in Kings County, New Brunswick, Canada. It is connected to the community of Kars via the Belleisle Bay Ferry year round.

== See also ==
- List of communities in New Brunswick
