= Springfield, Kings County, New Brunswick =

Coordinates: 45.636472°N 65.830047°W

Location of Springfield in New Brunswick

Springfield is an unincorporated community in Kings County, New Brunswick, Canada on Route 124. It is near the head of Belleisle Bay.

== See also ==
- List of communities in New Brunswick
