= Evandale, New Brunswick =

Coordinates: 45.589778°N 66.030861°W

Location of Evandale in New Brunswick

Evandale is a community in Canada, in the province of New Brunswick. It is situated on the west bank of the Saint John River, and on New Brunswick Route 102.

The Evandale Ferry, a cable ferry, carries Route 124 across the river from Kars on the east bank.

== History ==
After the American Revolution this community was named "Wordens" for New York Loyalist Jarvis Worden, a member of the King's American Regiment in the American Revolution. The community assumed its present name in 1886.

== See also ==
- List of communities in New Brunswick
