= Kars, New Brunswick =

Coordinates: 45.597°N 65.975°W

Kars is a rural community in Kings County, New Brunswick, Canada. Kars is served by two cable ferries. The Belleisle Bay Ferry connects Kars year round to Long Point and the Evandale Ferry connects Kars year round to Evandale. The community is named after the Siege of Kars.

== See also ==
- List of communities in New Brunswick
