= New Brunswick Route 124 =

Highway in New Brunswick, Canada

Route 124

Route information
- Maintained by New Brunswick Department of Transportation
- Length: 34.6 km (21.5 mi)
- Existed: 1965–present

Major junctions
- West end: Route 102 in Evandale
- East end: Route 1 / Route 865 in Valley Waters

Location
- Country: Canada
- Province: New Brunswick
- Major cities: Valley Waters, Springfield

Highway system
- Provincial highways in New Brunswick; Former routes
← Route 123	→ Route 126

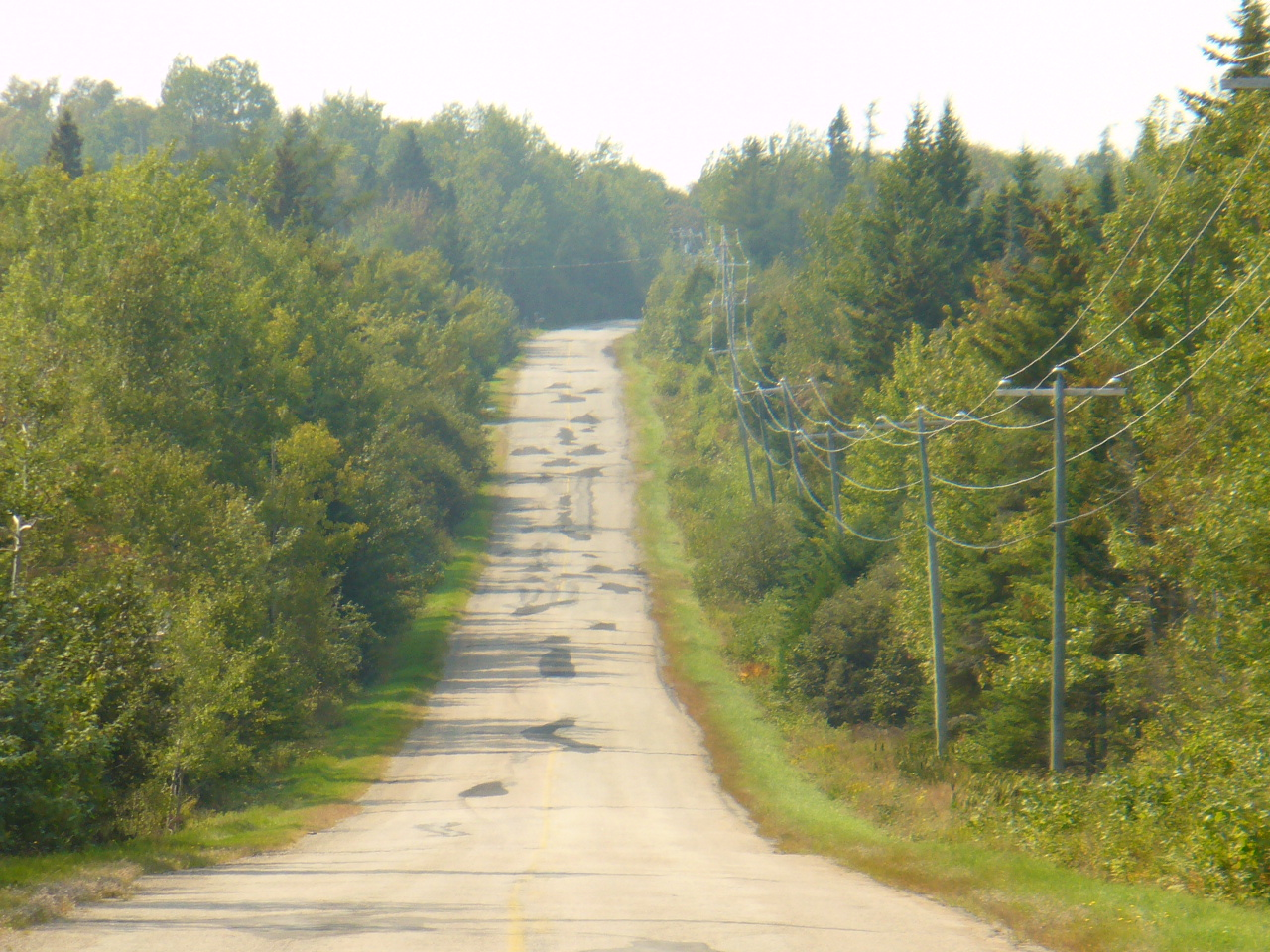
A typical stretch of Route 124 in Kars

Route 124 is an east/west provincial highway in the Canadian province of New Brunswick. The road runs from Route 1 exit 175 in Valley Waters as far as the Saint John River, where it crosses the Evandale Ferry to Evandale and an intersection with Route 102. The road has a length of approximately 41.3 kilometres, excluding the distance across the river, and services small, otherwise isolated rural communities. In these areas, the highway is often unofficially referred to as "Mountain Road."

This route intersects with New Brunswick Route 850.

== Communities along Route 124 ==
- Valley Waters
- Midland
- Springfield
- Hatfield Point
- Kars
- Evandale

== See also ==
- List of New Brunswick provincial highways
