= Hampstead, New Brunswick =

Community in New Brunswick, Canada

Coordinates: 45.621061°N 66.082506°W

Location of Hampstead in New Brunswick

Hampstead is a community in Hampstead Parish, New Brunswick, Canada. It was settled by Loyalists from New York in 1786 and was named for Hempstead, New York.

The former local service district of Hampstead took its name from the community but included all of the parish not within CFB Gagetown.
