= Belleisle Creek, New Brunswick =

Human settlement in New Brunswick, Canada

Coordinates: 45°43′19.20″N 65°44′55.35″W

Belleisle Creek (/bɛˈlɪl/) is a Canadian rural community in Kings County, New Brunswick, west of the town of Sussex. Belleisle Creek is surrounded by rolling hills of the Caledonia Highlands. It records some of the highest snowfalls in the Maritime Provinces.

== See also ==
- List of communities in New Brunswick
